= International Criminal Court =

International tribunal organisation

(in other official languages)
- - French: Cour pénale internationale
  - Arabic: المحكمة الجنائية الدولية
  - Chinese: 国际刑事法院
  - Russian: Международный уголовный суд
  - Spanish: Corte Penal Internacional
- Official logo

- State parties to the International Criminal Court
- Seat: The Hague, Netherlands
- Working languages: English; French
- Official languages: 6 languages: Arabic; Chinese; English; French; Russian; Spanish
- Type: International court
- Member states: 125 (Oct 2024)

Leaders
  - President: Tomoko Akane
  - First Vice-President: Rosario Salvatore Aitala
  - Second Vice-President: Reine Alapini-Gansou
  - Prosecutor: Vacant
  - Registrar: Osvaldo Zavala Giler

Establishment
  - Rome Statute adopted: 17 July 1998
  - Entered into force: 1 July 2002
- Website www.icc-cpi.int

The International Criminal Court (ICC) is an intergovernmental organisation and international tribunal seated in The Hague, Netherlands. Established in 2002 under the multilateral Rome Statute, the ICC is the first and only permanent international court with jurisdiction to prosecute individuals for the international crimes of genocide, crimes against humanity, war crimes, and the crime of aggression. The ICC is intended to complement, not replace, national judicial systems; it can exercise its jurisdiction only when national courts are unwilling or unable to prosecute criminals. It is distinct from the International Court of Justice, an organ of the United Nations that hears disputes between states.

The ICC can generally exercise jurisdiction in cases where the accused is a national of a state party, the alleged crime took place on the territory of a state party, or a situation is referred to the Court by the United Nations Security Council. As of October 2024, there are 125 states parties to the Rome Statute, which are represented in the court's governing body, the Assembly of States Parties. Countries that are not party to the Rome Statute and do not recognise the court's jurisdiction include China, India, Russia, and the United States.

The Office of the Prosecutor has opened investigations into over a dozen situations and conducted numerous preliminary examinations. The Court issued its first arrest warrants in 2005, and issued its first judgment in 2012. Indicted individuals have included heads of state and other senior officials. In recent years, notable cases include arrest warrants issued for Russian president Vladimir Putin, in connection with the invasion of Ukraine, and Israeli prime minister Benjamin Netanyahu and defence minister Yoav Gallant, along with several Hamas leaders, in connection with the Gaza genocide.

Since its establishment, the ICC has faced significant criticism. Opponents, including major powers that have not joined the court, question its legitimacy, citing concerns over national sovereignty and alleging susceptibility to political influence. The court has also been accused of bias and of disproportionately targeting African leaders. Others have questioned the court's effectiveness, pointing to its reliance on state cooperation for arrests, its relatively small number of convictions, and the high cost of its proceedings.

== History ==
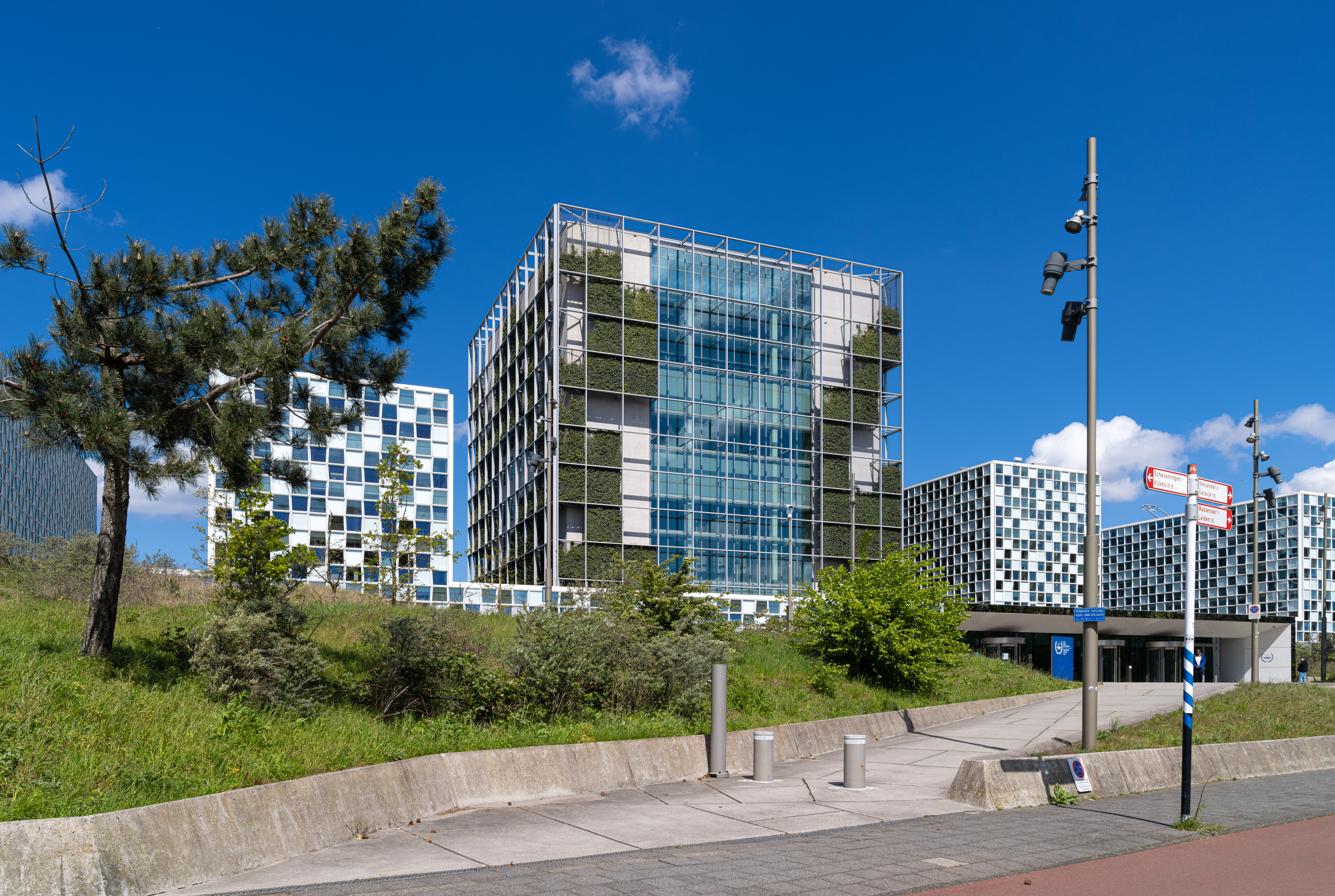
The premises of the International Criminal Court in The Hague, Netherlands. The ICC moved into this building in December 2015.

=== Background ===
The establishment of an international tribunal to judge political leaders accused of international crimes was first proposed during the Paris Peace Conference in 1919 following the First World War by the Commission of Responsibilities. The issue was addressed again at a conference held in Geneva under the auspices of the League of Nations in 1937, which resulted in the conclusion of the first convention stipulating the establishment of a permanent international court to try acts of international terrorism. The convention was signed by 13 states, but none ratified it, so the convention never entered into force.

Following the Second World War, the allied powers established two ad hoc tribunals to prosecute Axis leaders accused of war crimes. The International Military Tribunal, which sat in Nuremberg and is often referred to as the "Nuremberg trials", prosecuted German leaders, including for Nazi perpetration of The Holocaust, while the International Military Tribunal for the Far East in Tokyo prosecuted Japanese leaders for war crimes and crimes against humanity. In 1948 the United Nations General Assembly first recognised the need for a permanent international court to deal with atrocities of the kind prosecuted after World War II. At the request of the General Assembly, the International Law Commission (ILC) drafted two statutes by the early 1950s, but these were shelved during the Cold War, which made the establishment of an international criminal court politically unrealistic.

Benjamin B. Ferencz, an investigator of Nazi war crimes after World War II and the chief prosecutor for the United States Army at the Einsatzgruppen trial, became a vocal advocate of the establishment of international rule of law and of an international criminal court. In his book Defining International Aggression: The Search for World Peace (1975), he advocated for the establishment of such a court. Another leading proponent was Robert Kurt Woetzel, a German-born professor of international law, who co-edited Toward a Feasible International Criminal Court in 1970 and created the Foundation for the Establishment of an International Criminal Court in 1971.

=== Formal proposal and establishment ===
In June 1989, A. N. R. Robinson, who would later become Prime Minister of Trinidad and Tobago, revived the idea of a permanent international criminal court by proposing the creation of a tribunal to address the illegal drug trade. In response, the General Assembly tasked the ILC with once again drafting a statute for a permanent court.

While work began on the draft, the UN Security Council established two ad hoc tribunals in the early 1990s: the International Criminal Tribunal for the former Yugoslavia, created in 1993 in response to large-scale atrocities committed by armed forces during the Yugoslav Wars, and the International Criminal Tribunal for Rwanda, created in 1994 following the Rwandan genocide. The creation of these tribunals further highlighted to many the need for a permanent international criminal court.

In 1994, the ILC presented its final draft statute for the International Criminal Court to the General Assembly and recommended that a conference be convened to negotiate a treaty that would serve as the Court's statute. To consider major substantive issues in the draft statute, the General Assembly established the Ad Hoc Committee on the Establishment of an International Criminal Court, which met twice in 1995. After considering the Committee's report, the General Assembly created the Preparatory Committee on the Establishment of the ICC to prepare a consolidated draft text. From 1996 to 1998, six sessions of the Preparatory Committee were held at the United Nations headquarters in New York City, during which NGOs provided input and attended meetings under the umbrella organisation of the Coalition for the International Criminal Court (CICC). In January 1998, the Bureau and coordinators of the Preparatory Committee convened for an inter-sessional meeting in Zutphen in the Netherlands to technically consolidate and restructure the draft articles into a draft.

Finally, the General Assembly convened a conference in Rome in June 1998, with the aim of finalising the treaty to serve as the Court's statute. On 17 July 1998, the Rome Statute of the International Criminal Court was adopted by a vote of 120 to seven, with 21 countries abstaining. The seven countries that voted against the treaty were China, Iraq, Israel, Libya, Qatar, the U.S., and Yemen.

Israel's opposition to the treaty stemmed from the inclusion in the list of war crimes "the action of transferring population into occupied territory", a provision added during the Rome Conference at the insistence of Arab countries with the specific intention of targeting Israeli citizens.

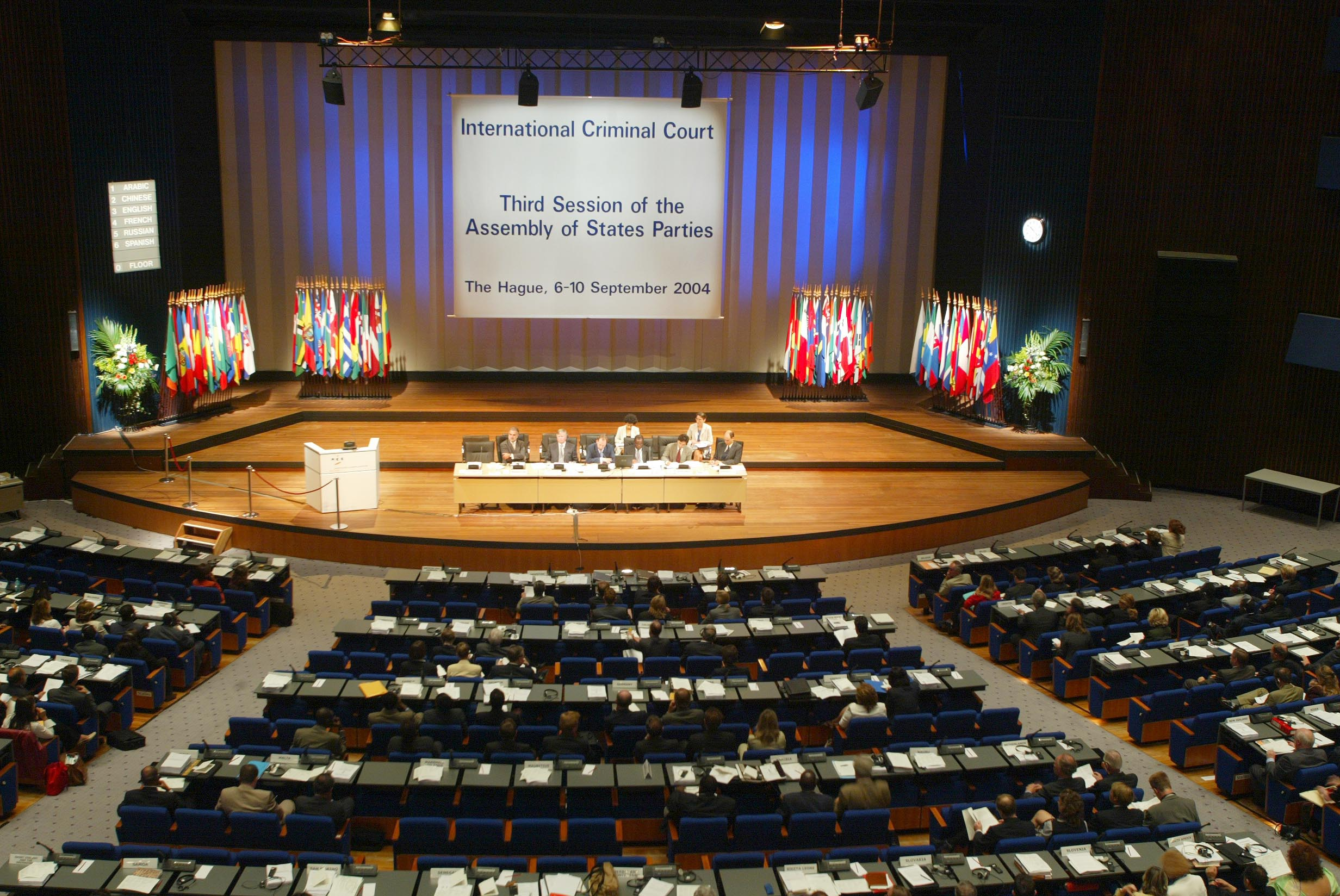
The third Assembly of States Parties to the Rome Statute of the International Criminal Court is held in The Hague, the Netherlands in the Fall 2004.

The UN General Assembly voted on 9 December 1999 and again on 12 December 2000 to endorse the ICC. Following 60 ratifications, the Rome Statute entered into force on 1 July 2002 and the International Criminal Court was formally established. The first bench of 18 judges was elected by the Assembly of States Parties in February 2003. They were sworn in at the inaugural session of the Court on 11 March 2003.

The Court issued its first arrest warrants on 8 July 2005, and the first pre-trial hearings were held in 2006.

The Court issued its first judgment in 2012 when it found Congolese rebel leader Thomas Lubanga Dyilo guilty of war crimes related to using child soldiers.

In 2010, the states parties of the Rome Statute held the first Review Conference of the Rome Statute of the International Criminal Court in Kampala, Uganda. The Review Conference led to the adoption of two resolutions that amended the crimes under the jurisdiction of the Court. Resolution 5 amended Article 8 on war crimes, criminalising the use of certain kinds of weapons in non-international conflicts whose use was already forbidden in international conflicts. Resolution 6, pursuant to Article 5(2) of the Statute, provided the definition and a procedure for jurisdiction over the crime of aggression.

== Operation ==
The ICC began operations on 1 July 2002, upon the entry into force of the Rome Statute, a multilateral treaty that serves as the court's charter and governing document. States which become party to the Rome Statute become members of the ICC, serving on the Assembly of States Parties, which administers the court. As of January 2025, there are 125 ICC member states, 29 states have signed but not ratified the Rome Statute (including four who have withdrawn their signature) and 41 states have neither signed nor become parties to the Rome Statute.

Intended to serve as the "court of last resort", the ICC complements existing national judicial systems and may exercise its jurisdiction only when national courts are unwilling or unable to prosecute criminals. It lacks universal territorial jurisdiction and may only investigate and prosecute crimes committed within member states, crimes committed by nationals of member states, or crimes in situations referred to the Court by the UN Security Council.

The ICC held its first hearing in 2006, concerning war crimes charges against Thomas Lubanga Dyilo, a Congolese warlord accused of recruiting child soldiers; his subsequent conviction in 2012 was the first in the court's history. The Office of the Prosecutor has opened twelve official investigations and is conducting an additional nine preliminary examinations.

=== Establishing the court's jurisdiction ===
The process to establish the court's jurisdiction may be "triggered" by any one of three possible sources: (1) a state party, (2) the Security Council or (3) a prosecutor. It is then up to the prosecutor acting proprio motu to initiate an investigation under the requirements of Article 15 of the Rome Statute. The procedure is slightly different when referred by a state party or the Security Council, in which cases the prosecutor does not need authorisation of the Pre-Trial Chamber to initiate the investigation. Where there is a reasonable basis to proceed, it is mandatory for the prosecutor to initiate an investigation. The factors listed in Article 53 considered for reasonable basis include whether the case would be admissible, and whether there are substantial reasons to believe that an investigation would not serve the interests of justice (the latter stipulates balancing against the gravity of the crime and the interests of the victims).

== Structure ==
The ICC is governed by the Assembly of States Parties, which is made up of the states that are party to the Rome Statute. The Assembly elects officials of the Court, approves its budget, and adopts amendments to the Rome Statute. The Court itself has four organs: the Presidency, the Judicial Divisions, the Office of the Prosecutor, and the Registry.

=== State parties ===
As of January 2025, 125 states (Note: The sum of (a) states parties, (b) signatories and (c) non-signatory United Nations member states is 195. This number is two more than the number of United Nations member states (193) due to Palestine and Cook Islands being states parties but not United Nations member states.) are parties to the Statute of the Court, including all the countries of South America, nearly all of Europe, most of Oceania and roughly half of Africa. Burundi and the Philippines were member states, but later withdrew effective 27 October 2017 and 17 March 2019, respectively. A further 29 countries have signed but not ratified the Rome Statute. The law of treaties obliges these states to refrain from "acts which would defeat the object and purpose" of the treaty until they declare they do not intend to become a party to the treaty. Four signatory states have informed the UN Secretary General that they no longer intend to become states parties and, as such, have no legal obligations arising from their signature of the Statute; they are Israel in 2002, the United States on 6 May 2002, Sudan on 26 August 2008, and Russia on 30 November 2016. Forty-one other states have neither signed nor acceded to the Rome Statute. Some of them, including China and India, are critical of the Court.

==== Assembly ====
The Court's management oversight and legislative body, the Assembly of States Parties, consists of one representative from each state party. Each state party has one vote and "every effort" has to be made to reach decisions by consensus. If consensus cannot be reached, decisions are made by vote. The Assembly is presided over by a president and two vice-presidents, who are elected by the members to three-year terms.

The Assembly meets in full session once a year, alternating between New York and The Hague, and may also hold special sessions where circumstances require. Sessions are open to observer states and non-governmental organisations.

The Assembly elects the judges and prosecutors, decides the Court's budget, adopts important texts (such as the Rules of Procedure and Evidence), and provides management oversight to the other organs of the Court. Article 46 of the Rome Statute allows the Assembly to remove from office a judge or prosecutor who "is found to have committed serious misconduct or a serious breach of his or her duties" or "is unable to exercise the functions required by this Statute".

The states parties cannot interfere with the judicial functions of the Court. Disputes concerning individual cases are settled by the Judicial Divisions.

===== Bureau =====
The Bureau of the Assembly assists the Assembly in discharging its responsibilities between the Assembly's plenary sessions. The Assembly elects a Bureau consisting of a President, two Vice-Presidents, and 18 members elected for three-year terms, chosen with regard to equitable geographical distribution and adequate representation of the principal legal systems of the world. The Bureau meets as often as necessary (typically several times a year) and handles preparatory and administrative work, oversight, and coordination so that the full Assembly—which meets only once a year—can function effectively. It also operates through subsidiary working groups, notably The Hague Working Group and the New York Working Group.

=== Organs ===
The ICC has four principal organs: the Presidency, the Judicial Divisions, the Office of the Prosecutor and the Registry.

- The President is the most senior judge chosen by the eighteen judges in the Judicial Division.
- The Judicial Division is composed of eighteen judges and hears cases before the Court.
- The Office of the Prosecutor is headed by the Prosecutor, who investigates crimes and initiates criminal proceedings before the Judicial Division.
- The Registry is headed by the Registrar and is charged with managing all the administrative functions of the ICC, including the headquarters, detention unit, and public defence office.

The ICC employs over 900 personnel from roughly 100 countries and conducts proceedings in English and French.

==== Presidency ====
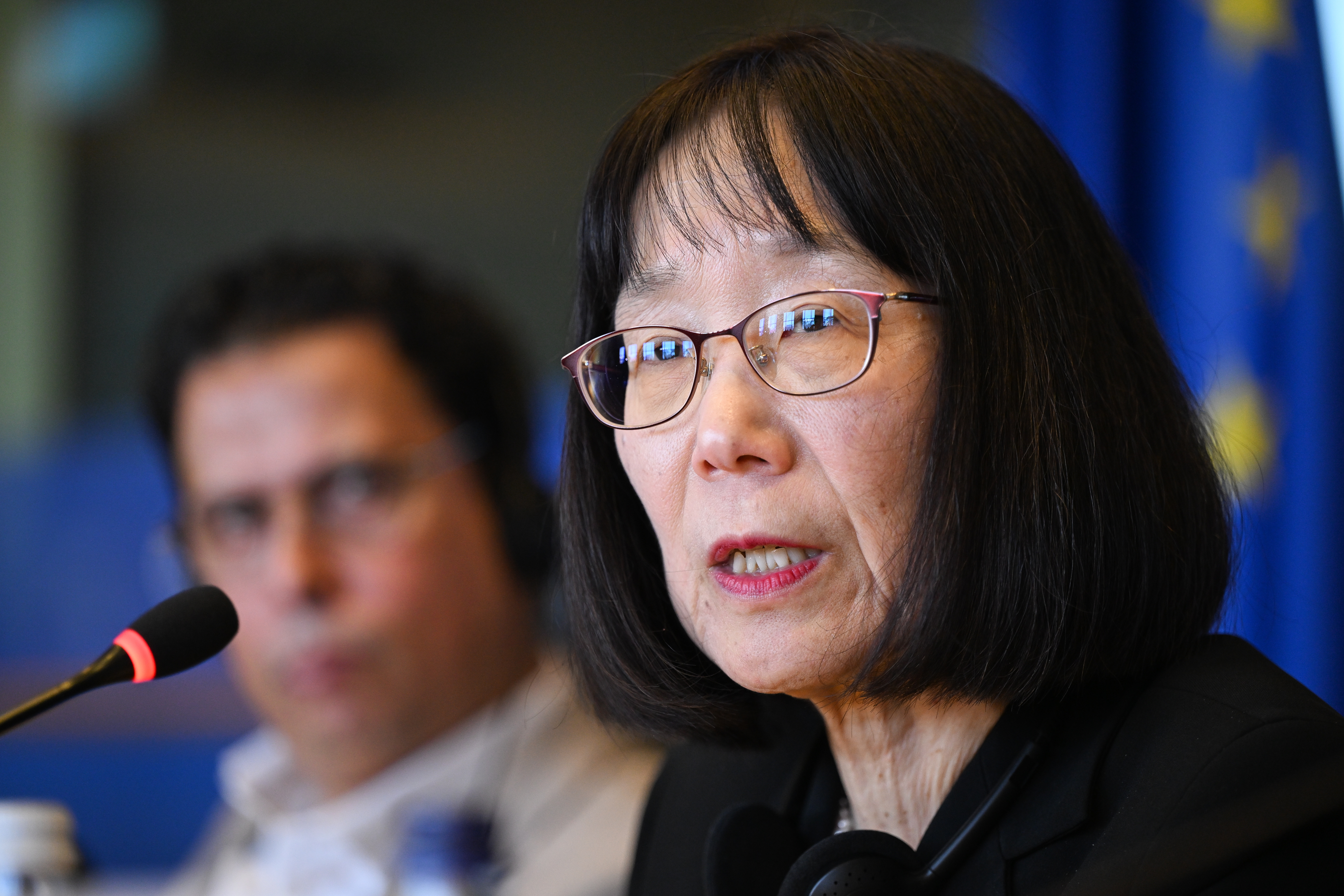
Tomoko Akane, President of the ICC since 2024

The Presidency is responsible for the proper administration of the Court (apart from the Office of the Prosecutor). It comprises the President and the First and Second Vice-Presidents—three judges of the Court who are elected to the Presidency by their fellow judges for a maximum of two three-year terms.

Song Sang-hyun was the President of the ICC from 2009 to 2015. As of March 2024, the President is Tomoko Akane from Japan, who took office on 11 March 2024, succeeding Piotr Hofmański. Her first term will expire in 2027.

==== Judicial Division ====
The Judicial Divisions consist of the 18 judges of the Court, organised into three chambers—the Pre-Trial Chamber, Trial Chamber and Appeals Chamber—which carry out the judicial functions of the Court. Judges are elected to the Court by the Assembly of States Parties. They serve nine-year terms and are not generally eligible for re-election. All judges must be nationals of states parties to the Rome Statute, and no two judges may be nationals of the same state. They must be "persons of high moral character, impartiality and integrity who possess the qualifications required in their respective States for appointment to the highest judicial offices".

The Prosecutor or any person being investigated or prosecuted may request the disqualification of a judge from "any case in which his or her impartiality might reasonably be doubted on any ground". Any request for the disqualification of a judge from a particular case is decided by an absolute majority of the other judges. Judges may be removed from office if "found to have committed serious misconduct or a serious breach of his or her duties" or is unable to exercise his or her functions. The removal of a judge requires both a two-thirds majority of the other judges and a two-thirds majority of the states parties.

==== Office of the Prosecutor ====
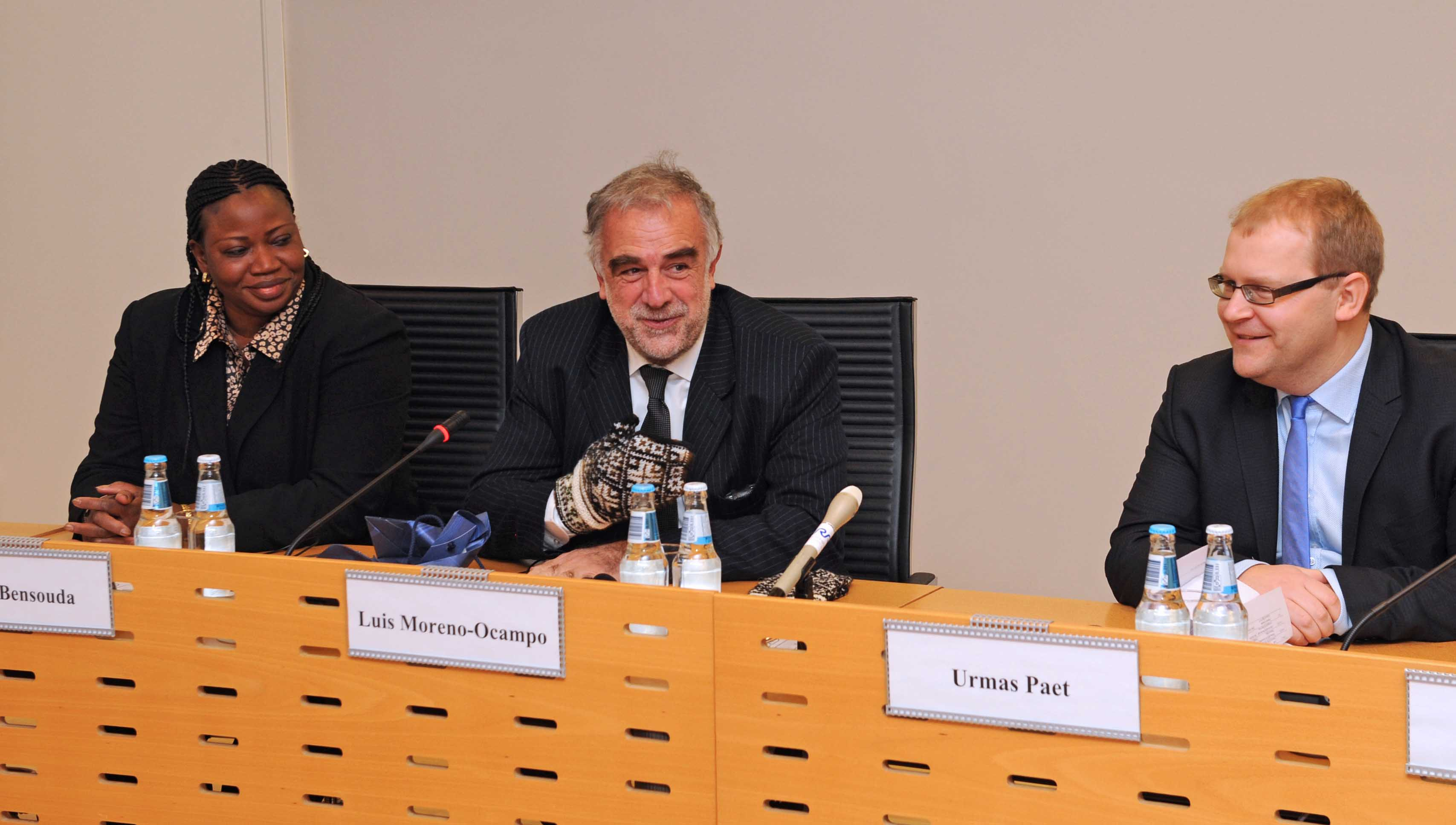
ICC prosecutors Fatou Bensouda and Luis Moreno Ocampo, with Estonia's Minister of Foreign Affairs, Urmas Paet, in 2012

The Office of the Prosecutor (OTP) is responsible for conducting investigations and prosecutions. It is headed by the Prosecutor of the International Criminal Court, who is assisted by one or more Deputy Prosecutors. The Rome Statute provides that the Office of the Prosecutor shall act independently; as such, no member of the Office may seek or act on instructions from any external source, such as states, international organisations, non-governmental organisations or individuals.

The Prosecutor may open an investigation under three circumstances:

- when a situation is referred by a state party;
- when a situation is referred by the United Nations Security Council, acting to address a threat to international peace and security; or
- when the Pre-Trial Chamber authorises the prosecutor to open an investigation on the basis of information received from other sources, such as individuals or non-governmental organisations.

Any person being investigated or prosecuted may request the disqualification of a prosecutor from any case "in which their impartiality might reasonably be doubted on any ground". Requests for the disqualification of prosecutors are decided by the Appeals Chamber. A prosecutor may be removed from office by an absolute majority of the states parties through a finding "to have committed serious misconduct or a serious breach of his or her duties" or is unable to exercise his or her functions.

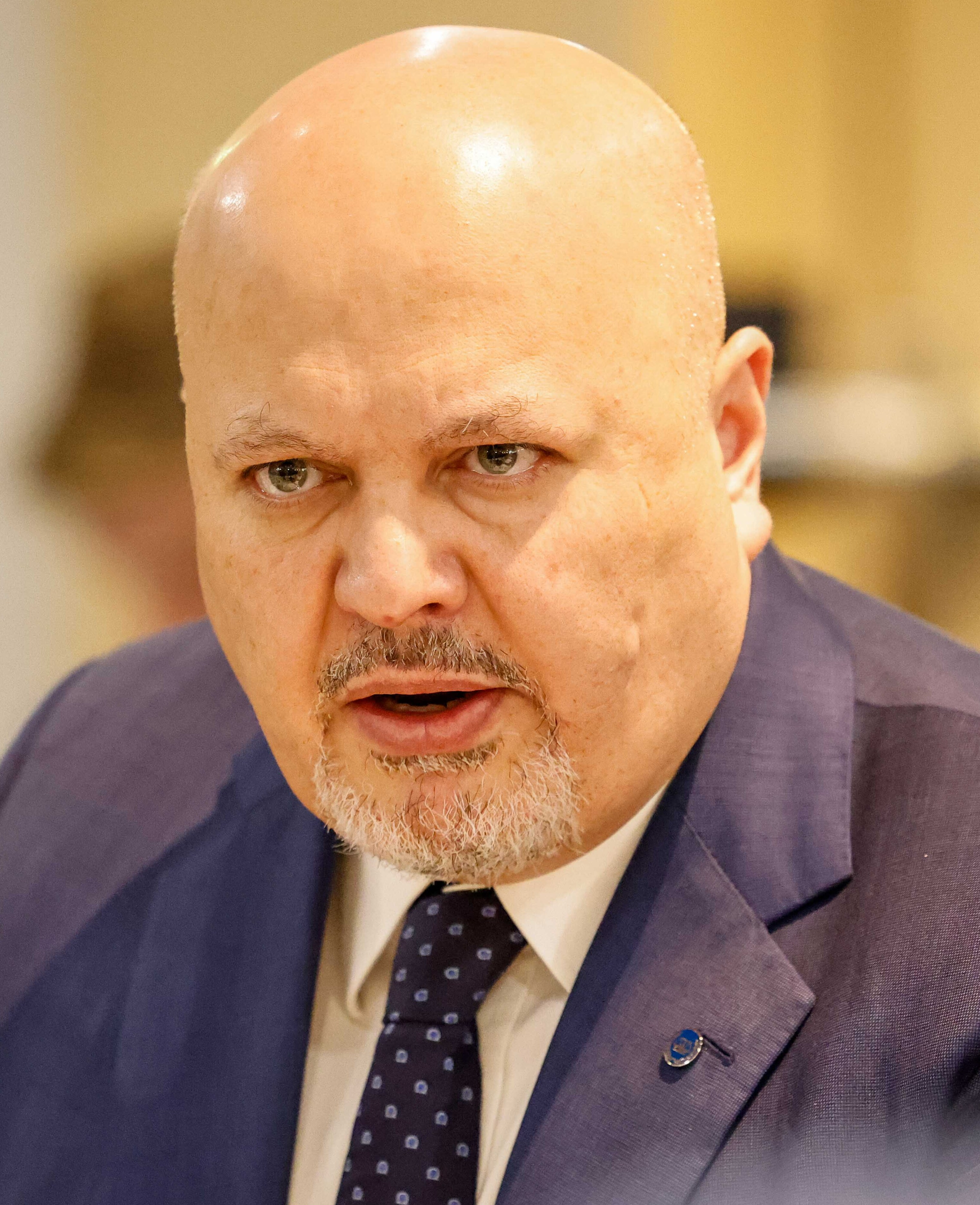
Karim Khan, then ICC Prosecutor, photographed in April 2022

Lead prosecutor Luis Moreno Ocampo of Argentina, in office from 2003 to 2012, was succeeded in the role by Fatou Bensouda of Gambia, who served from 16 June 2012 to 16 June 2021. (She was elected to the nine-year term on 12 December 2011.)

On 12 February 2021, British barrister Karim Khan was selected in a secret ballot against three other candidates to serve as lead prosecutor as of 16 June 2021. As a British barrister, Khan had headed the United Nations' special investigative team when it looked into Islamic State crimes in Iraq. At the ICC, he had been lead defence counsel on cases from Kenya, Sudan and Libya.

===== Policy papers =====
The Office of the Prosecutor occasionally publishes policy papers that put forth the considerations given to topics the office focuses on, and often the criteria for case selection. While a policy paper does not give the Court jurisdiction over a new category of crimes, it promises what the Office of Prosecutor will consider when selecting cases in the upcoming term of service. OTP's policy papers are subject to revision.

The following papers have been published since the start of the ICC:

- 1 September 2007: Policy Paper on the Interest of Justice
- 12 April 2010: Policy Paper on Victims' Participation
- 1 November 2013: Policy Paper on Preliminary Examinations
- 20 June 2014: Policy Paper on Sexual and Gender-Based Crimes
- 15 September 2016: Policy paper on case selection and prioritisation
- 15 November 2016: Policy on Children

The paper published in September 2016 announced that the ICC will focus on environmental crimes when selecting cases. The Office will give particular consideration to prosecuting Rome Statute crimes that are committed by means of, or that result in, "inter alia, the destruction of the environment, the illegal exploitation of natural resources or the illegal dispossession of land". This has been interpreted as a major shift in environmental law and a move with significant effects.

==== Registry ====
The Registry is responsible for the non-judicial aspects of the administration and servicing of the Court. This includes, among other things,

The administration of legal aid matters, court management, victims and witnesses matters, defence counsel, detention unit, and the traditional services provided by administrations in international organisations, such as finance, translation, building management, procurement and personnel.

The Registry is headed by the Registrar, who is elected by the judges to a five-year term. As of April 2023 the Registrar is Osvaldo Zavala Giler.

List of Registrars of the ICC
Registrar	Term	Reference
Bruno Cathala	2003–2008	
Silvana Arbia	2008–2013	
Herman von Hebel	2013–2018	
Peter Lewis	2018–2023	
Osvaldo Zavala Giler	2023–present	

== Prosecutable crimes ==
The Court's subject-matter jurisdiction means the crimes for which individuals can be prosecuted. Individuals can only be prosecuted for crimes that are listed in the Statute. The primary crimes are listed in article 5 of the Statute and defined in later articles: genocide (defined in article 6), crimes against humanity (defined in article 7), war crimes (defined in article 8), and crimes of aggression (defined in article 8 bis) (since 2018). In addition, article 70 defines offences against the administration of justice, which is a fifth category of crime for which individuals can be prosecuted.

=== Genocide ===
Article 6 defines the crime of genocide as "acts committed with intent to destroy, in whole or in part, a national, ethnical, racial or religious group". There are five such acts which constitute crimes of genocide under Article 6:

1. Killing members of a group
2. Causing serious bodily or mental harm to members of the group
3. Deliberately inflicting on the group conditions of life calculated to bring about its physical destruction
4. Imposing measures intended to prevent births within the group
5. Forcibly transferring children of the group to another group

The definition of these crimes is identical to those contained within the Convention on the Prevention and Punishment of the Crime of Genocide of 1948.

=== Crimes against humanity ===
Article 7 defines crimes against humanity as acts "committed as part of a widespread or systematic attack directed against any civilian population, with knowledge of the attack". The article lists 16 such individual crimes:

1. Murder
2. Extermination
3. Enslavement
4. Deportation or forcible transfer of population
5. Imprisonment or other severe deprivation of physical liberty
6. Torture
7. Rape
8. Sexual slavery
9. Enforced prostitution
10. Forced pregnancy
11. Enforced sterilisation
12. Sexual violence
13. Persecution
14. Enforced disappearance of persons
15. Apartheid
16. Other inhumane acts

=== War crimes ===
Article 8 defines war crimes depending on whether an armed conflict is either international (which generally means it is fought between states) or non-international (which generally means that it is fought between non-state actors, such as rebel groups, or between a state and such non-state actors). The most serious crimes constitute either grave breaches of the Geneva Conventions of 1949 and its Protocols. In total there are 74 war crimes listed in article 8.

Eleven crimes constitute grave breaches of the Geneva Conventions and apply only to international armed conflicts:

1. Wilful killing
2. Torture
3. Inhumane treatment
4. Biological experiments
5. Wilfully causing great suffering
6. Destruction and appropriation of property
7. Compelling service in hostile forces
8. Denying a fair trial
9. Unlawful deportation and transfer
10. Unlawful confinement
11. Taking hostages

Seven crimes constitute serious violations of Article 3 common to the Geneva Conventions and apply only to non-international armed conflicts:

1. Murder
2. Mutilation
3. Cruel treatment
4. Torture
5. Outrages upon personal dignity
6. Taking hostages
7. Sentencing or execution without due process

Another 56 crimes are defined by Article 8: 35 apply to international armed conflicts and 21 to non-international armed conflicts. Such crimes include attacking civilians or civilian objects, attacking peacekeepers, causing excessive incidental death or damage, transferring populations into occupied territories, treacherously killing or wounding, denying quarter, pillaging, employing poison, using expanding bullets, rape and other forms of sexual violence, and conscripting or using child soldiers.

=== Crimes of aggression ===
Article 8 bis defines crimes of aggression. The Statute originally provided that the Court could not exercise its jurisdiction over the crime of aggression until such time as the states parties agreed on a definition of the crime and set out the conditions under which it could be prosecuted. Such an amendment was adopted at the first review conference of the ICC in Kampala, Uganda, in June 2010. This amendment specified that the ICC would not be allowed to exercise jurisdiction of the crime of aggression until two further conditions had been satisfied: (1) the amendment has entered into force for 30 states parties and (2) on or after 1 January 2017, the Assembly of States Parties has voted in favour of allowing the Court to exercise jurisdiction. On 26 June 2016 the first condition was satisfied and the state parties voted in favour of allowing the Court to exercise jurisdiction on 14 December 2017. The Court's jurisdiction to prosecute crimes of aggression was accordingly activated on 17 July 2018.

The Statute, as amended, defines the crime of aggression as "the planning, preparation, initiation or execution, by a person in a position effectively to exercise control over or to direct the political or military action of a State, of an act of aggression which, by its character, gravity and scale, constitutes a manifest violation of the Charter of the United Nations." The Statute defines an "act of aggression" as "the use of armed force by a State against the sovereignty, territorial integrity or political independence of another State, or in any other manner inconsistent with the Charter of the United Nations." The article also contains a list of seven acts of aggression, which are identical to those in United Nations General Assembly Resolution 3314 of 1974 and include the following acts when committed by one state against another state:

1. Invasion or attack by armed forces against territory
2. Military occupation of territory
3. Annexation of territory
4. Bombardment against territory
5. Use of any weapons against territory
6. Blockade of ports or coasts
7. Attack on the land, sea, or air forces or marine and air fleets
8. The use of armed forces which are within the territory of another state by agreement, but in contravention of the conditions of the agreement
9. Allowing territory to be used by another state to perpetrate an act of aggression against a third state
10. Sending armed bands, groups, irregulars, or mercenaries to carry out acts of armed force

=== Offences against the administration of justice ===
Article 70 criminalises certain intentional acts which interfere with investigations and proceedings before the Court, including giving false testimony, presenting false evidence, corruptly influencing a witness or official of the Court, retaliating against an official of the Court, and soliciting or accepting bribes as an official of the Court.

== Jurisdiction and admissibility ==
The Rome Statute requires that several criteria exist in a particular case before an individual can be prosecuted by the Court. The Statute contains three jurisdictional requirements and three admissibility requirements. All criteria must be met for a case to proceed. The three jurisdictional requirements are (1) subject-matter jurisdiction (what acts constitute crimes), (2) territorial or personal jurisdiction (where the crimes were committed or who committed them), and (3) temporal jurisdiction (when the crimes were committed).

For an individual to be prosecuted by the Court either territorial jurisdiction or personal jurisdiction must exist. Therefore, an individual can only be prosecuted if he or she has either (1) committed a crime within the territorial jurisdiction of the Court or (2) committed a crime while being a national of a state that is within the territorial jurisdiction of the Court.

=== Territorial jurisdiction ===
The territorial jurisdiction of the Court includes the territory, registered vessels, and registered aircraft of states which have either (1) become party to the Rome Statute or (2) accepted the Court's jurisdiction by filing a declaration with the Court.

In situations that are referred to the Court by the United Nations Security Council, the territorial jurisdiction is defined by the Security Council, which may be more expansive than the Court's normal territorial jurisdiction. For example, if the Security Council refers a situation that took place in the territory of a state that has both not become party to the Rome Statute and not lodged a declaration with the Court, the Court will still be able to prosecute crimes that occurred within that state.

=== Personal jurisdiction ===
The personal jurisdiction of the Court extends to all natural persons who commit crimes in the territories of states that are parties to the Rome Statute or of states that have accepted the Court's jurisdiction by filing a declaration with the Court, as well as on board aircraft or vessels registered with those states. Personal jurisdiction may always be exercised over nationals of all the above-mentioned states, regardless of where the crimes were committed. As with territorial jurisdiction, the personal jurisdiction can be expanded by the Security Council if it refers a situation to the Court.

=== Temporal jurisdiction requirements ===
Temporal jurisdiction is the time period over which the Court can exercise its powers. No statute of limitations applies to any of the crimes defined in the Statute. This is not completely retroactive. Individuals can only be prosecuted for crimes that took place on or after 1 July 2002, which is the date that the Rome Statute entered into force. If a state became party to the Statute, and therefore a member of the Court, after 1 July 2002, then the Court cannot exercise jurisdiction prior to the membership date for certain cases. For example, if the Statute entered into force for a state on 1 January 2003, the Court could only exercise temporal jurisdiction over crimes that took place in that state or were committed by a national of that state on or after 1 January 2003.

=== Admissibility requirements ===
To initiate an investigation, the Prosecutor must (1) have a "reasonable basis to believe that a crime within the jurisdiction of the Court has been or is being committed", (2) the investigation would be consistent with the principle of complementarity, and (3) the investigation serves the interests of justice.

The principle of complementarity means the Court will only prosecute an individual if states are unwilling or unable to prosecute. Therefore, if legitimate national investigations or proceedings into crimes have taken place or are ongoing, the Court will not initiate proceedings. This principle applies regardless of the outcome of national proceedings. Even if an investigation is closed without any criminal charges being filed or if an accused person is acquitted by a national court, the Court will not prosecute an individual for the crime in question so long as it is satisfied that the national proceedings were legitimate. The application of the complementarity principle has recently come under theoretical scrutiny.

The Court will only initiate proceedings if a crime is of "sufficient gravity to justify further action by the Court".

The Prosecutor will initiate an investigation unless there are "substantial reasons to believe that an investigation would not serve the interests of justice" when "[t]aking into account the gravity of the crime and the interests of victims". Furthermore, even if an investigation has been initiated and there are substantial facts to warrant a prosecution and no other admissibility issues, the Prosecutor must determine whether a prosecution would serve the interests of justice "taking into account all the circumstances, including the gravity of the crime, the interests of victims and the age or infirmity of the alleged perpetrator, and his or her role in the alleged crime".

=== Individual criminal responsibility ===
The Court has jurisdiction over natural persons. A person who commits a crime within the jurisdiction of the Court is individually responsible and liable for punishment in accordance with the Rome Statute. In accordance with the Rome Statute, a person shall be criminally responsible and liable for punishment for a crime within the jurisdiction of the Court if that person: Commits such a crime, whether as an individual, jointly with another or through another person, regardless of whether that other person is criminally responsible; Orders, solicits or induces the commission of such a crime which in fact occurs or is attempted; For the purpose of facilitating the commission of such a crime, aids, abets or otherwise assists in its commission or its attempted commission, including providing the means for its commission; In any other way contributes to the commission or attempted commission of such a crime by a group of persons acting with a common purpose. In respect of the crime of genocide, directly and publicly incites others to commit genocide; Attempts to commit such a crime by taking action that commences its execution by means of a substantial step, but the crime does not occur because of circumstances independent of the person's intentions

== Procedure ==
=== Trial ===
Trials are conducted under a hybrid common law and civil law judicial system, but it has been argued the procedural orientation and character of the court is still evolving. A majority of the three judges present, as triers of fact in a bench trial, may reach a decision, which must include a full and reasoned statement. Trials are supposed to be public, but proceedings are often closed, and such exceptions to a public trial have not been enumerated in detail. In camera proceedings are allowed for protection of witnesses or defendants as well as for confidential or sensitive evidence. Hearsay and other indirect evidence is not generally prohibited, but it has been argued the court is guided by hearsay exceptions which are prominent in common law systems. There is no subpoena or other means to compel witnesses to come before the court, although the court has some power to compel testimony of those who chose to come before it, such as fines.

=== Rights of the accused ===
The Rome Statute provides that all persons are presumed innocent until proven guilty beyond reasonable doubt, and establishes certain rights of the accused and persons during investigations. (Note: The rights of persons during an investigation are provided in Article 55. Rights of the accused are provided in Part 6, especially Article 67.) These include the right to be fully informed of the charges against them; the right to have a lawyer appointed, free of charge; the right to a speedy trial; and the right to examine the witnesses against them.

To ensure "equality of arms" between defence and prosecution teams, the ICC has established an independent Office of Public Counsel for the Defence (OPCD) to provide logistical support, advice and information to defendants and their counsel. The OPCD also helps to safeguard the rights of the accused during the initial stages of an investigation. Thomas Lubanga's defence team said they were given a smaller budget than the prosecutor and that evidence and witness statements were slow to arrive.

=== Victim participation ===
One of the great innovations of the Statute of the International Criminal Court and its Rules of Procedure and Evidence is the series of rights granted to victims. For the first time in the history of international criminal justice, victims have the possibility under the Statute to present their views and observations before the Court.

Participation before the Court may occur at various stages of proceedings and may take different forms, although it will be up to the judges to give directions as to the timing and manner of participation.

Participation in the Court's proceedings will in most cases take place through a legal representative and will be conducted "in a manner which is not prejudicial or inconsistent with the rights of the accused and a fair and impartial trial".

The victim-based provisions within the Rome Statute provide victims with the opportunity to have their voices heard and to obtain, where appropriate, some form of reparation for their suffering. It is the aim of this attempted balance between retributive and restorative justice that, it is hoped, will enable the ICC to not only bring criminals to justice but also help the victims themselves obtain some form of justice. Justice for victims before the ICC comprises both procedural and substantive justice, by allowing them to participate and present their views and interests, so that they can help to shape truth, justice and reparations outcomes of the Court.

Article 43(6) establishes a Victims and Witnesses Unit to provide "protective measures and security arrangements, counselling and other appropriate assistance for witnesses, victims who appear before the Court, and others who are at risk on account of testimony given by such witnesses." Article 68 sets out procedures for the "Protection of the victims and witnesses and their participation in the proceedings." The Court has also established an Office of Public Counsel for Victims, to provide support and assistance to victims and their legal representatives.

=== Reparations ===
Victims before the International Criminal Court can also claim reparations under Article 75 of the Rome Statute. Reparations can only be claimed when a defendant is convicted and at the discretion of the Court's judges. So far the Court has ordered reparations against Thomas Lubanga. Reparations can include compensation, restitution and rehabilitation, but other forms of reparations may be appropriate for individual, collective or community victims. Article 79 of the Rome Statute establishes a Trust Fund to provide assistance before a reparation order to victims in a situation or to support reparations to victims and their families if the convicted person has no money.

=== Cooperation by states not party to Rome Statute ===
One of the principles of international law is that a treaty does not create either obligations or rights for third states without their consent, and this is also enshrined in the 1969 Vienna Convention on the Law of Treaties. The cooperation of the non-party states with the ICC is envisioned by the Rome Statute of the International Criminal Court to be of a voluntary nature. States not acceded to the Rome Statute might still be subject to an obligation to cooperate with the ICC in certain cases. When a case is referred to the ICC by the UN Security Council all UN member states are obliged to cooperate, since its decisions are binding for all of them. Also, there is an obligation to respect and ensure respect for international humanitarian law, which stems from the Geneva Conventions and Additional Protocol I, which reflects the absolute nature of international humanitarian law.

In relation to cooperation in investigation and evidence gathering, it is implied from the Rome Statute that the consent of a non-party state is a prerequisite for the Prosecutor to conduct an investigation within its territory, and it seems that it is even more necessary for him to observe any reasonable conditions raised by that state, since such restrictions exist for states party to the Statute. Taking into account the experience of the International Criminal Tribunal for the former Yugoslavia (which worked with the principle of primacy, instead of complementarity) in relation to cooperation, some scholars have expressed their pessimism as to the possibility of the ICC obtaining the cooperation of non-party states. As for the actions that the ICC can take toward non-party states that do not cooperate, the Rome Statute stipulates that the Court may inform the Assembly of States Parties or Security Council, when the matter was referred by it, when a non-party state refuses to cooperate after it has entered into an ad hoc arrangement or an agreement with the Court.

=== Amnesty and national reconciliation processes ===
It is unclear to what extent the ICC is compatible with reconciliation processes that grant amnesty to human rights abusers as part of agreements to end conflict. Article 16 of the Rome Statute allows the Security Council to prevent the Court from investigating or prosecuting a case, and Article 53 allows the Prosecutor the discretion not to initiate an investigation if he or she believes that "an investigation would not serve the interests of justice". Former ICC president Philippe Kirsch has said that "some limited amnesties may be compatible" with a country's obligations genuinely to investigate or prosecute under the Statute.

It is sometimes argued that amnesties are necessary to allow the peaceful transfer of power from abusive regimes. By denying states the right to offer amnesty to human rights abusers, the International Criminal Court may make it more difficult to negotiate an end to conflict and a transition to democracy. For example, the outstanding arrest warrants for four leaders of the Lord's Resistance Army are regarded by some as an obstacle to ending the insurgency in Uganda. Czech politician Marek Benda argues that "the ICC as a deterrent will in our view only mean the worst dictators will try to retain power at all costs". The United Nations and the International Committee of the Red Cross maintain that granting amnesty to those accused of war crimes and other serious crimes is a violation of international law.

== Facilities ==
=== Headquarters ===
International Criminal Court
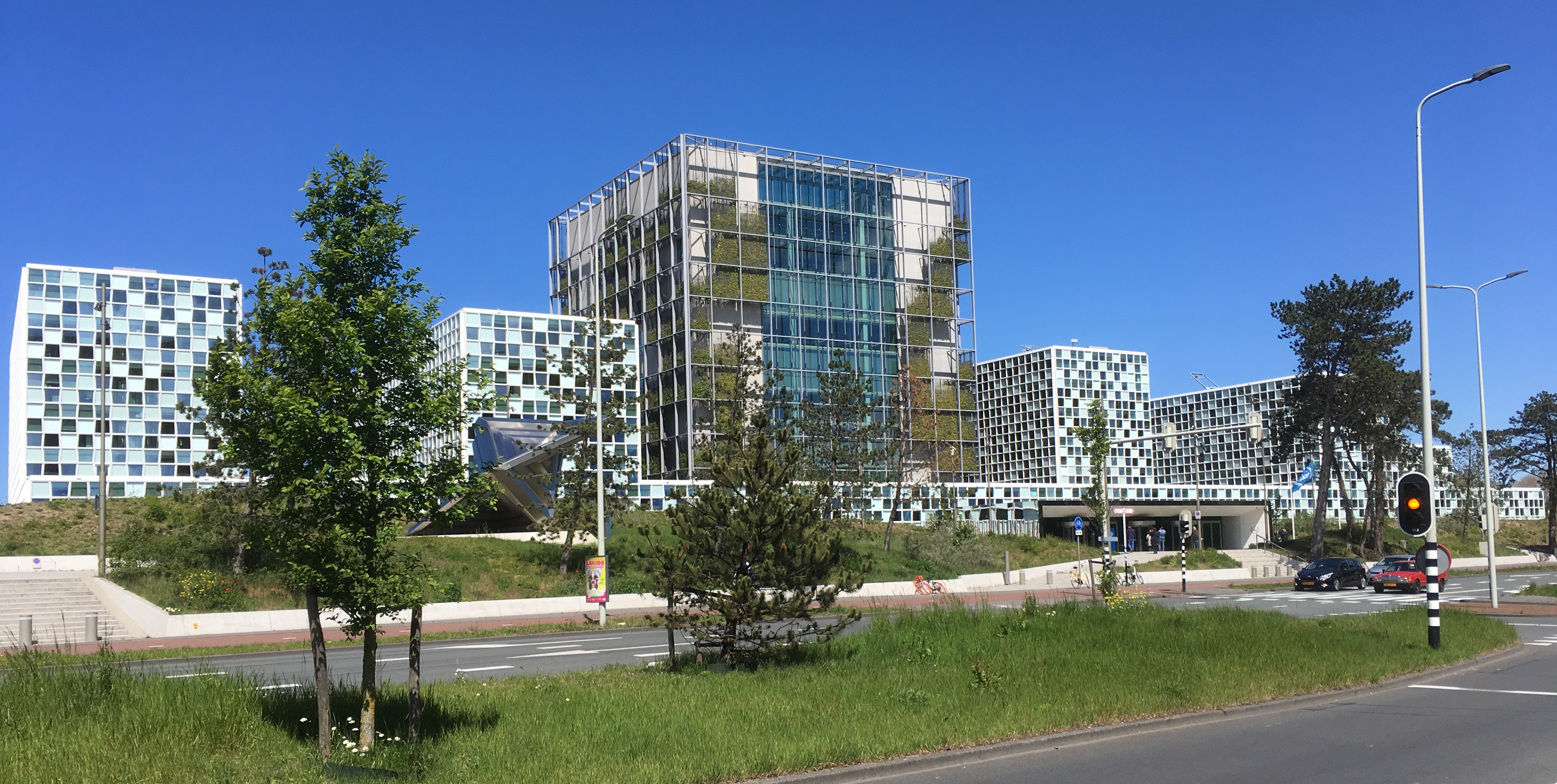

General information
- Status: Completed
- Type: Office
- Location: The Hague, Netherlands
- Coordinates: 52°6′20″N 4°19′4″E
- Construction started: Autumn 2012
- Opened: December 2015

Technical details
- Floor area: 52,000 m^{2} (560,000 sq ft)

Design and construction
- Architect: Schmidt Hammer Lassen
- Developer: Combination Visser & Smit Bouw and Boele & van Eesteren ('Courtys')

The official seat of the Court is in The Hague, Netherlands, but its proceedings may take place anywhere. (Note: The legal relationship between the ICC and the Netherlands is governed by a headquarters agreement, which entered into force on 1 March 2008.)

The Court moved into its first permanent premises in The Hague, located at Oude Waalsdorperweg 10, on 14 December 2015. Part of The Hague's International Zone, which also contains the Peace Palace, Europol, Eurojust, ICTY, OPCW and The Hague World Forum, the court facilities are situated on the site of the Alexanderkazerne, a former military barracks, adjacent to the dune landscape on the northern edge of the city. The ICC's detention centre is a short distance away.

The land and financing for the construction were provided by the Netherlands. The host state also organised and financed the architectural design competition, which started at the end of 2008. Three architects were chosen by an international jury from 171 applicants to enter into further negotiations. The Danish firm Schmidt Hammer Lassen were selected to design the premises, since its design met all the ICC criteria, such as design quality, sustainability, functionality and costs.

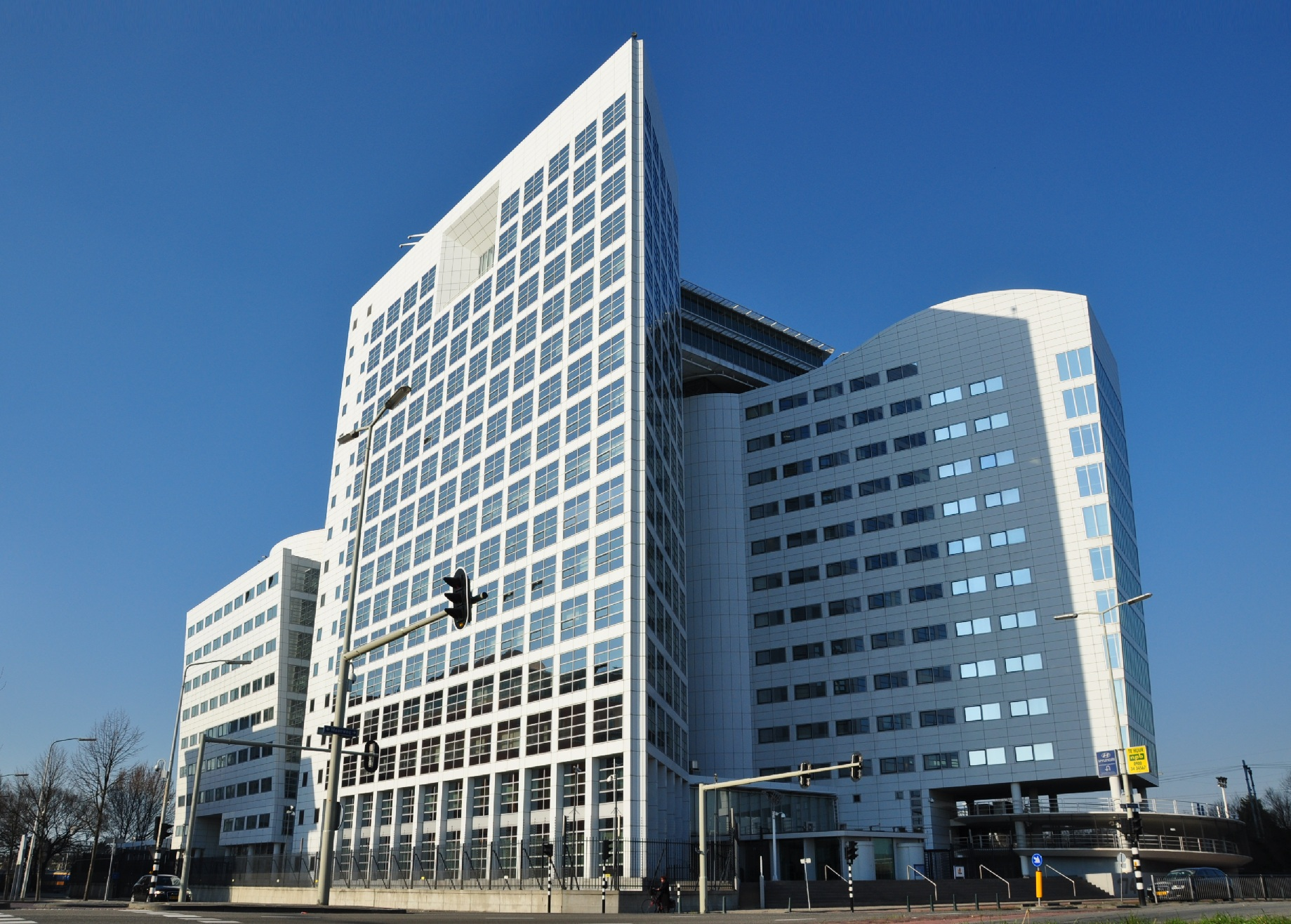
The former (provisional) headquarters of the ICC, in use until December 2015

The barracks were demolished from November 2011 to August 2012. In October 2012 the tendering procedure for the general contractor was completed and the combination Visser & Smit Bouw and Boele & van Eesteren ("Courtys") was selected.

The building has a compact footprint and consists of six connected building volumes with a garden motif. The tallest volume with a green façade, placed in the middle of the design, is the Court Tower, which accommodates three courtrooms. The rest of the building's volumes accommodate the offices of the different organs of the ICC.

From 2002 to late 2015, the ICC was housed in interim premises in The Hague provided by the Netherlands. Formerly belonging to KPN, the provisional headquarters were located at Maanweg 174 in the east-central portion of the city.

=== Detention centre ===
The ICC's detention centre accommodates both those convicted by the court and serving sentences as well as those suspects detained pending the outcome of their trial. It comprises twelve cells on the premises of the Scheveningen branch of the Hague Penitentiary Institution, The Hague, close to the ICC's headquarters in the Alexanderkazerne. Suspects held by the former International Criminal Tribunal for the former Yugoslavia were held in the same prison and shared some facilities, like the fitness room, but had no contact with suspects held by the ICC.

=== Other offices ===
The ICC maintains a liaison office in New York and field offices in places where it conducts its activities. As of 18 October 2007, the Court had field offices in Kampala, Kinshasa, Bunia, Abéché and Bangui.

=== Digital infrastructure ===
The ICC used Microsoft digital infrastructure, including email, Microsoft Office, file storage and "software for evidence analysis" through to 2025. During 2025, following Trump sanctions against the ICC, the ICC Prosecutor and some other ICC staff switched from Microsoft email to Proton Mail.

In late October 2025, the ICC stated that it would switch from Microsoft Office to OpenDesk, a free and open-source productivity software suite managed by the German Centre for Digital Sovereignty in Public Administration (ZenDiS).

== Funding ==
Top contributions per country in 2024
No.	Country	Contributions (€)	Percent (%)
1	Japan	25,105,436	13.4
2	Germany	21,480,416	11.5
3	France	15,972,647	8.5
4	United Kingdom	15,378,334	8.2
5	Italy	11,209,416	5.6
6	South Korea	9,278,240	5.0
7	Canada	9,237,533	4.9
8	Spain	7,501,080	4.0
9	Brazil	7,492,611	4.0
10	Australia	7,420,157	4.0
Others		57,008,314	30.5
Total		187,084,184	100.0

The ICC is financed by contributions from the states parties. The amount payable by each state party is determined using the same method as the United Nations: each state's contribution is based on the country's capacity to pay, which reflects factors such as national income and population. The maximum amount a single country can pay in any year is limited to 22% of the Court's budget; Japan paid this amount in 2008.

The Court spent €80.5 million in 2007. The Assembly of States Parties approved a budget of €90.4 million for 2008, €101.2 million for 2009, and €141.6 million for 2017. As of April 2017, the ICC's staff consisted of 800 persons from approximately 100 states.

== Trial history ==
The Court's Pre-Trial Chambers have publicly indicted 76 people. Proceedings against 39 are ongoing: 33 are at large as fugitives, two cases are in the pre-trial stage, one person is on trial, and three cases are in the appeals stage. Proceedings against 37 have been completed: three are serving sentences, seven have finished sentences, four have been acquitted, eight have had the charges against them dismissed, five have had the charges against them withdrawn, and 10 have died before the conclusion of the proceedings against them.

The indicted individuals include Ugandan rebel leader Joseph Kony, former President Omar al-Bashir of Sudan, President Uhuru Kenyatta of Kenya, Libyan head of state Muammar Gaddafi, President Laurent Gbagbo of Ivory Coast and former Vice President Jean-Pierre Bemba of the Democratic Republic of the Congo.

In 2015, several Congolese individuals were tried by the ICC. Thomas Lubanga was convicted and sentenced to 14 years imprisonment, Germain Katanga to 12 years, and Mathieu Ngudjolo Chui was acquitted.

The judgment of Jean-Pierre Bemba was rendered in March 2016. Bemba was convicted on two counts of crimes against humanity and three counts of war crimes. This marked the first time the ICC convicted someone of sexual violence as they added rape to his conviction. Bemba's convictions were overturned by the Court's Appeal Chamber in June 2018. The Court refused to compensate Bemba for losses suffered by him during his 10 years of imprisonment. It has been argued that this decision raises important questions about the court's present powers.

Ntaganda (DR Congo) was convicted to 30 years for crimes against humanity. The Bemba et al. OAJ case and the Laurent Gbagbo-Blé Goudé trial in the Côte d'Ivoire situation ended in acquittals. The Banda trial in the situation of Darfur, Sudan, was scheduled to begin in 2014 but the start date was vacated.

Charges against Malian Ahmad al-Faqi al-Mahdi have been confirmed and he was sentenced to nine years in prison. On 25 November 2021, his sentence was commuted to 7 years in prison, and he was released on 18 September 2022. Ugandan Dominic Ongwen has been convicted to a prison sentence of 25 years.

On 6 July 2020, two Uyghur activist groups filed a complaint with the ICC calling for it to investigate PRC officials for crimes against Uyghurs, including allegations of genocide. In December 2020, ICC prosecutors rejected the complaint, stating that the ICC did not have jurisdictional basis to proceed.

On 31 October 2023, the Israeli families of over 34 victims of the 2023 Hamas-led attack on Israel, filed an Article 15 communication with the ICC prosecutor's office urging an investigation into the killings and abductions, and the ICC confirmed the receipt of the filing. Reporters Without Borders also lodged a complaint regarding the deaths of eight Palestinian journalists in the Gaza Strip during Israel's bombardment, as well as an Israeli journalist killed during a surprise attack by Hamas in southern Israel.

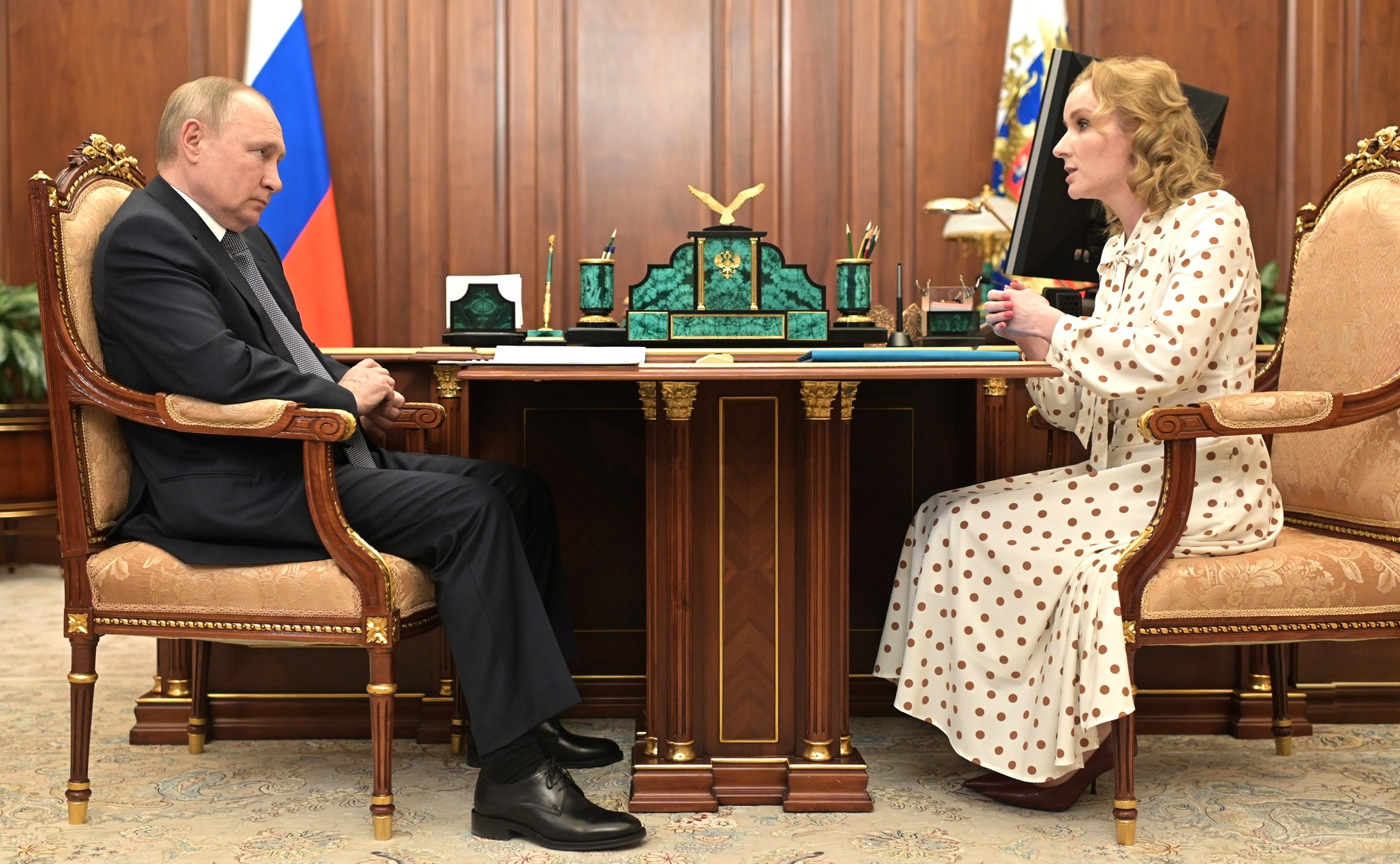
Maria Lvova-Belova during a meeting with Russian President Vladimir Putin on March 9, 2022

On 17 March 2023, ICC judges issued arrest warrants for Russian president Vladimir Putin and the Presidential Commissioner for Children's Rights in Russia Maria Lvova-Belova for child abductions in the 2022 Russian invasion of Ukraine. Russia denounced the arrest warrants as "outrageous". Putin became the first head of state of a U.N. Security Council Permanent Member to be the subject of an ICC arrest warrant. Although Russia withdrew its signature from the Rome Statute in 2016, and is thus not a participant in the ICC nor under its jurisdiction, Putin can be charged for actions against Ukraine, which only became a full state party to the Statute on 1 January 2025, because it had previously accepted the Court's jurisdiction for an indefinite period starting from 21 November 2013. Should Putin travel to a state party, he can be arrested by local authorities. Later in 2023, Russia's Ministry of Internal Affairs retaliated by placing several ICC officials on its wanted list. In March 2024, the ICC issued two more arrest warrants, for Sergey Kobylash, the commander of the Long-Range Aviation of the Russian Aerospace Forces, and Viktor Sokolov, the commander of the Black Sea Fleet over their role in war crimes in Ukraine. In December 2025, the Moscow City Court sentenced the chief prosecutor Karim Khan, the first vice president Rosario Salvatore Aitala and seven others judges of the ICC in absentia to prison terms of up to 15 years each.

On 20 May 2024, the ICC's chief prosecutor Karim Khan announced his intention to seek arrest warrants for Israeli prime minister Benjamin Netanyahu, Israeli defence minister Yoav Gallant, leader of Hamas Yahya Sinwar, leader of the Al Qassem Brigades Mohammed Deif, and Hamas political leader Ismail Haniyeh in connection to war crimes committed in the Israel-Hamas war. On 21 November, warrants were formally issued for Netanyahu, Gallant and Deif. Warrants for Haniyeh and Sinwar were withdrawn following confirmation of their deaths in July and October respectively. In February 2025, ICC canceled arrest warrant issued against Hamas’s late military chief Muhammad Deif, who was killed in Gaza in July 2024.

On 23 January 2025, the ICC's chief prosecutor Karim Khan announced requests for arrest warrants against Taliban leader Haibatullah Akhundzada and the chief justice of Afghanistan Abdul Hakim Haqqani, for crimes against humanity of the oppression and persecution of Afghan women and girls, who have been deprived of the freedom of movement, the rights to control their bodies, to education, and to a private and family life. Alleged resistance and opposition are brutally suppressed with murder, imprisonment, torture, rape, and other forms of sexual violence, since 2021. On 8 July 2025, the ICC's Pre-Trial Chamber II issued the requested arrest warrants. On 5 October 2026 the ICC unsealed arrest warrants for Afghan Education Minister Habibullah Agha, and Higher Education Minister Neda Mohammad Nadeem, accusing them of crimes against humanity for denying Afghanistan's women and girls over 12 their rights to an education.

== Investigations and preliminary examinations ==
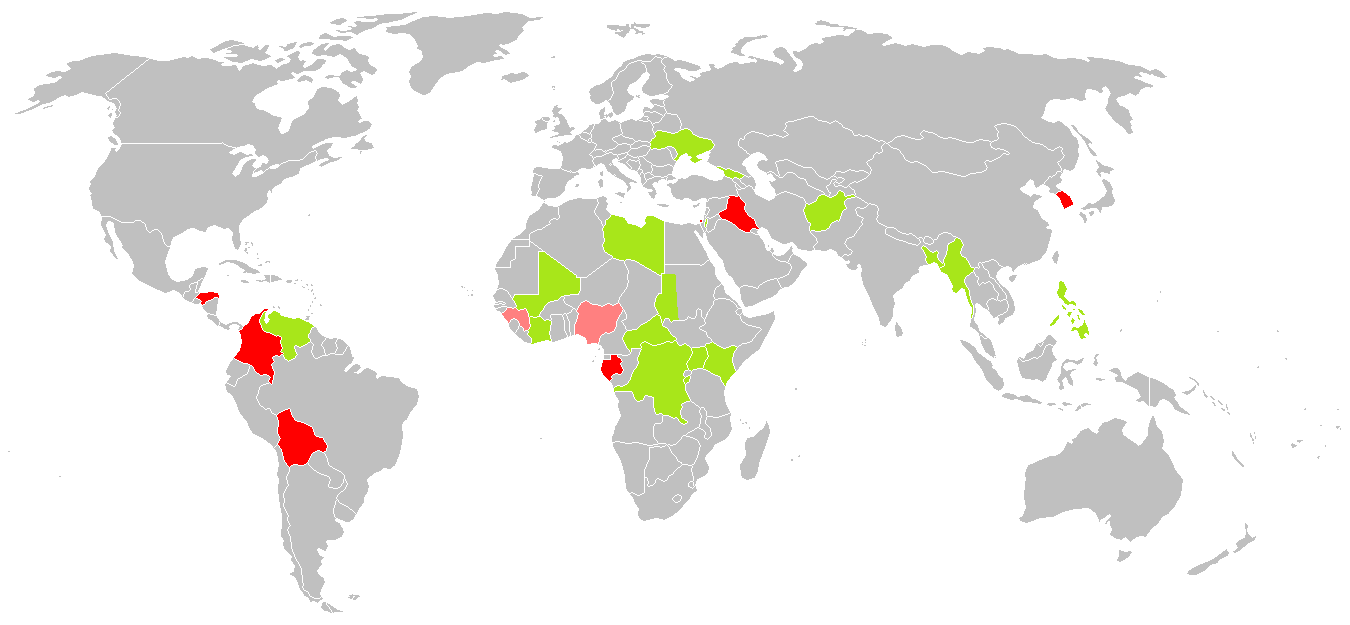
ICC investigations and examinations, as of March 2022 Official investigations (Uganda, DR Congo, Central African Republic I + II, Darfur (Sudan), Kenya, Libya, Côte d'Ivoire, Mali, Georgia, Burundi, Afghanistan, Palestine, Venezuela I, Bangladesh/Myanmar, Philippines, Ukraine) Authorisation to open investigation requested (none at present) Ongoing preliminary examinations (Nigeria) Closed preliminary examinations that have not resulted in an investigation (Colombia, Iraq, Honduras, South Korea, Comoros (registered vessels), Gabon, Bolivia, Guinea)

By 2026, the Office of the Prosecutor has opened investigations in Afghanistan (twice), Bangladesh/Myanmar, Burundi, the Central African Republic (twice), Côte d'Ivoire, Darfur in Sudan, the Democratic Republic of the Congo, Georgia, Kenya, Libya, Lithuania/Belarus, Mali, Palestine, the Philippines, Uganda, Ukraine, and Venezuela I. The Office of the Prosecutor carried out and closed preliminary investigations in Bolivia; Colombia; Congo II; Gabon; Guinea; Honduras; Iraq/the United Kingdom; registered vessels of Comoros, Greece, and Cambodia; South Korea; and Venezuela II. An ongoing preliminary examination is being carried out in the situation in Nigeria.

Key: Investigation Investigation pending authorisation Preliminary examination ongoing Preliminary examination closed
Situation	Referred by	Referred on	Preliminary examination on	Investigation on	Current status (Note: The Office of the Prosecutor processes preliminary examinations through different phases. Every communication is first given an initial assessment to determine if it is sufficiently serious and if it falls within the Court's jurisdiction (phase 1). If it does, the Office begins a preliminary examination by first considering whether the alleged crimes fall within the subject-matter jurisdiction of the Court (phase 2). If the Office is satisfied that all the jurisdictional requirements are met, it then focuses on issues of admissibility by considering complementarity and the gravity of the alleged crimes (phase 3). If there are no admissibility concerns, the Office then considers the interests of justice and decides whether or not to begin a formal investigation (phase 4). Once a formal investigation is opened, it is also processed through different phases. It is first processed through an "investigation phase" (phase 1), in which the Office determines the scope of its caseload, and then through a "prosecution phase" (phase 2), in which the Office completes the caseload.)	Ref(s).
Democratic Republic of the Congo	Democratic Republic of the Congo	19 April 2004	16 July 2003	23 June 2004	Investigation (phase 1)	
Côte d'Ivoire	—	—	1 October 2003	3 October 2011	Investigation (phase 1)	
Uganda	Uganda	16 December 2003	16 December 2003	29 July 2004	Investigation (phase 2)	
Colombia	—	—	30 June 2004	—	Preliminary examination closed on 28 October 2021	
Central African Republic I	Central African Republic	7 January 2005	7 January 2005	22 May 2007	Investigation (phase 2)	
Darfur, Sudan	United Nations Security Council	31 March 2005	1 April 2005	6 June 2005	Investigation (phase 1)	
Iraq/United Kingdom	—	—	9 February 2006	—	Preliminary examination closed on 9 December 2020 (Note: The preliminary examination of the situation in Iraq / the United Kingdom was initially closed on 9 February 2006, but was reopened on 13 May 2014.)	
Venezuela	—	—	9 February 2006	—	Preliminary examination closed on 9 February 2006	
Afghanistan I (Note: Following the start of the investigation, Chile, Costa Rica, Spain, France, Luxembourg, and Mexico referred the situation.)	—	—	2007	5 March 2020	Investigation (phase 1)	
Kenya	—	—	5 February 2008	31 March 2010	Investigation (phase 2)	
Georgia	—	—	20 August 2008	27 January 2016	Investigation (phase 2)	
Palestine (Note: A new preliminary investigation of the situation in Palestine was opened on 16 January 2015 and proceeded to a full investigation 3 March 2021.)	—	—	22 January 2009	—	Preliminary examination closed on 3 April 2012	
Guinea	—	—	14 October 2009	—	Preliminary examination closed on 29 September 2022	
Honduras	—	—	18 November 2009	—	Preliminary examination closed on 28 October 2015	
Nigeria	—	—	18 November 2010	—	Preliminary examination (phase 3)	
South Korea	—	—	6 December 2010	—	Preliminary examination closed on 23 June 2014	
Libya	United Nations Security Council	26 February 2011	28 February 2011	3 March 2011	Investigation (phase 1)	
Mali	Mali	18 July 2012	18 July 2012	16 January 2013	Investigation (phase 1)	
Registered vessels (Note: The preliminary examination relates to registered vessels of the Comoros, Greece and Cambodia.)	Comoros	14 May 2013	14 May 2013	—	Preliminary examination closed on 2 December 2019 (Note: The Prosecutor previously closed the preliminary examination of the situation on registered vessels of the Comoros, Greece and Cambodia on 6 November 2014, but reconsidered her decision following a request by the Pre-Trial Chamber on 29 November 2017 and revised the final decision on 2 December 2019.)	
Central African Republic II	Central African Republic	30 May 2014	7 February 2014	24 September 2014	Investigation (phase 2)	
Ukraine (Note: Albania, Australia, Austria, Belgium, Bulgaria, Canada, Colombia, Costa Rica, Croatia, Cyprus, the Czech Republic, Denmark, Estonia, Finland, France, Georgia, Germany, Greece, Hungary, Iceland, Ireland, Italy, Latvia, Liechtenstein, Lithuania, Luxembourg, Malta, New Zealand, Norway, the Netherlands, Poland, Portugal, Romania, Slovakia, Slovenia, Spain, Sweden, Switzerland, and the United Kingdom jointly referred the situation in Ukraine on 2 March 2022. Following the start of the investigation, Chile, Japan, Montenegro and North Macedonia also referred the situation.)	Albania et al.	2 March 2022	25 April 2014	2 March 2022	Investigation (phase 1)	
Palestine (Note: Following the start of the investigation, Bangladesh, Bolivia, Chile, Comoros, Djibouti, Mexico, and South Africa also referred the situation.)	Palestine	22 May 2018	16 January 2015	3 March 2021	Investigation (phase 1)	
Burundi	—	—	25 April 2016	25 October 2017	Investigation (phase 1)	
Gabon	Gabon	21 September 2016	29 September 2016	—	Preliminary examination closed on 21 September 2018	
Philippines	—	—	8 February 2018	15 September 2021	Investigation (phase 1)	
Venezuela I (Note: Argentina, Canada, Chile, Colombia, Paraguay, and Peru jointly referred the situation in Venezuela I on 27 September 2018. Following the start of the investigation, Ecuador and Uruguay also referred the situation. Venezuela referred the situation in Venezuela II on 13 February 2020. In a statement, the Prosecutor noted that the two referrals "appear to overlap geographically and temporally" but further noted that such a statement "should not prejudice a later determination on whether the referred scope of the two situations is sufficiently linked to constitute a single situation.")	Argentina et al.	27 September 2018	8 February 2018	3 November 2021	Investigation (phase 1)	
Bangladesh/Myanmar	—	—	18 September 2018	14 November 2019	Investigation (phase 1)	
Venezuela II	Venezuela	13 February 2020	17 February 2020	—	Preliminary examination closed on 12 March 2026	
Bolivia	Bolivia	4 September 2020	9 September 2020	—	Preliminary examination closed on 14 February 2022	
Democratic Republic of the Congo II	Democratic Republic of the Congo	23 May 2023	15 June 2023	—	Preliminary examination closed on 14 October 2024	
Lithuania/Belarus	Lithuania	30 September 2024	30 September 2024	12 March 2026	Investigation (phase 1)	
Afghanistan II (Note: Chile, Costa Rica, Spain, France, Luxembourg, and Mexico jointly referred the situation in Afghanistan II.)	Chile et al.	28 November 2024	15 September 2026	12 November 2026	Investigation (phase 1)	
Notes

Summary of investigations (Note: A situation is listed here if an investigation was begun by the Prosecutor.) and prosecutions by the International Criminal Court (not including reparations proceedings)
Situation	Publicly indicted	Ongoing procedures				Procedures finished, due to ...				PTC	TCs
Situation	Publicly indicted	Not before court	Pre-Trial	Trial	Appeal	Death	Inadmissibility	Acquittal etc.	Conviction	PTC	TCs
Situation	Publicly indicted	(Note: Indicted but has not yet appeared before the Court.)	(Note: Indicted and has had at least first appearance; trial has not yet begun.)	(Note: Trial has begun but has not yet been completed.)	(Note: Trial has been completed and verdict delivered but appeal is pending.)	(Note: Indicted but died before the trial or appeal (where applicable) was concluded.)	(Note: Indicted but case was held inadmissible.)	(Note: Indicted but either charges not confirmed or withdrawn or proceedings terminated or acquitted. If charges were not confirmed or withdrawn or if proceedings were terminated, the Prosecutor may again prosecute with fresh evidence.)		(Note: Pre-Trial Chamber currently in charge)	(Note: Trial Chambers currently in charge; once proceedings have moved to the Appeals Chamber, the Trial Chamber designation will be removed here.)
Democratic Republic of the Congo	6	1 Mudacumura	0	0	0	0	0	2 Chui, Mbarushimana	3 Katanga, Lubanga, Ntaganda	I	
Uganda	5	1 Kony	0	0	0	3 Lukwiya, Odhiambo, Otti	0	0	1 Ongwen	III	
Central African Republic I	5	0	0	0	0	0	0	1 Bemba (main case)	5 Kilolo, Babala, Mangenda, Arido, Bemba (OAJ)	II	
Darfur, Sudan	7	3 Haroun, al-Bashir, Hussein	0	0	1 Abd-Al-Rahman	1 Jerbo	0	2 Abu Garda, Banda	0	II	I Abd-Al-Rahman
Kenya	9	2 Barasa, Bett	0	0	0	1 Gicheru	0	6 Kosgey, Ali, Muthaura, Kenyatta, Ruto, Sang	0	II	
Libya	14	9 S. Gaddafi, Sneidel, Al Kani, Douma, Al Lahsa, Salheen, Al Shaqaqi, Al Zinkal, Njeem	1 El Hishri	0	0	3 M. Gaddafi, Khaled, Werfalli	1 Senussi	0	0	I	
Côte d'Ivoire	3	0	0		0	0	0	3 L. Gbagbo, Blé Goudé, S. Gbagbo	0	II	
Mali	3	1 Ghaly	0	0	0	0	0	0	2 al-Mahdi, al-Hassan	I	
Central African Republic II	6	1 Adam	0	0	3 Yekatom, Ngaïssona, Said	0	1 Beina	1 Mokom	0	II	V Yekatom, Ngaïssona; VI; Said
Georgia	3	3 Guchmazov, Mindzaev, Sanakoev	0	0	0	0	0	0	0	I	
Burundi	0	0	0	0	0	0	0	0	0	II	
Bangladesh / Myanmar	0	0	0	0	0	0	0	0	0	I	
Afghanistan	4	4 Akhundzada, Haqqani, Agha, Nadeem	0	0	0	0	0	0	0	II	
Palestine	3	2 Gallant, Netanyahu	0	0	0	1 Deif	0	0	0	I	
Philippines	2	1 dela Rosa	1 Duterte	0	0	0	0	0	0	I	
Venezuela I	0	0	0	0	0	0	0	0	0	I	
Ukraine	6	6 Putin, Lvova-Belova, Kobylash, Sokolov, Shoigu, Gerasimov	0	0	0	0	0	0	0	II	
Total	76	33	3	0	4	9	2	15	11		

Notes

Overview on cases currently active before the ICC (excludes cases against fugitives and reparations proceedings)
Between initial appearance and beginning of confirmation of charges hearing	Between beginning of confirmation of charges hearing and beginning of trial	Between beginning of trial and judgment	Between trial judgment and appeals judgment
	El Hishri		Yekatom, Ngaïssona, Said
	Duterte		Abd-Al-Rahman

Detailed summary of investigations (Note: A situation is listed here if the Prosecutor of the Court has opened an investigation.) and prosecutions by the International Criminal Court
Situation	Individuals indicted (Note: Obviously, only persons who are publicly indicted are listed. The Court can issue an indictment under seal.)	Indicted (Note: If not otherwise noted, the indicted is wanted by warrant of arrest.)					Transfer to ICC; Initial appearance (Note: If there was a warrant of arrest, the dates of transfer to the International Criminal Court (in italics) and of the initial appearance are given. In case of a summons to appear, only the date of the initial appearance is given.)	Confirmation of charges hearing Result	Trial; Result	Appeal hearings Result	Current status	Ref.
Situation	Individuals indicted	Date	G	CAH	WC	OAJ	Transfer to ICC; Initial appearance	Confirmation of charges hearing Result	Trial; Result	Appeal hearings Result	Current status	Ref.
Democratic Republic of the Congo; Investigation article	Thomas Lubanga Dyilo	10 February 2006	—	—	3	—	17 March 2006; 20 March 2006	9-28 November 2006 confirmed 29 January 2007	26 January 2009 – 26 August 2011 convicted 14 March 2012 sentenced 10 July 2012	19–20 May 2014 verdict and sentence confirmed 1 December 2014	Convicted and sentenced to 14 years imprisonment; decision final; reparations regime established; ICC-related sentence served (after 14 years)	
Democratic Republic of the Congo; Investigation article	Bosco Ntaganda	22 August 2006; 13 July 2012	—	3	7	—	22 March 2013; 26 March 2013	10-14 February 2014 confirmed 9 June 2014	2 September 2015 - 30 August 2018 convicted 8 July 2019 sentenced 7 November 2019	12–14 October 2020; Verdict and sentence confirmed 30 March 2021	Convicted and sentenced to 30 years imprisonment; decision final; in custody of Belgian authorities; release between 2033 and 2043	(Note: Article 110 (3) of the Rome Statute of the International Court states that "[w]hen the person has served two thirds of the sentence, or 25 years in the case of life imprisonment, the Court shall review the sentence to determine whether it should be reduced. Such a review shall not be conducted before that time." Article 78 (3) of the Rome Statute specifies that "[i]n imposing a sentence of imprisonment, the Court shall deduct the time, if any, previously spent in detention in accordance with an order of the Court. The Court may deduct any time otherwise spent in detention in connection with conduct underlying the crime." The Court's Trial Chamber VI determined in its sentencing decision that the time since 22 March 2013 is to be deducted from the sentence. Thus, Bosco Ntaganda is to be released on or before 22 March 2043. Starting from 22 March 2013, two-thirds of thirty years (twenty years) will elapse on 22 March 2033.)
Democratic Republic of the Congo; Investigation article	Germain Katanga	2 July 2007	—	3	6	—	17 October 2007; 22 October 2007	27 June–18 July 2008 confirmed 26 September 2008	24 November 2009 – 23 May 2012 convicted 7 March 2014 sentenced 23 May 2014	Appeals by Prosecution and Defence discontinued	Convicted and sentenced to 12 years imprisonment; decision final; reparations regime established; ICC-related sentence served (after 8 years, 4 months); remained in custody of DRC authorities due to other charges	
Democratic Republic of the Congo; Investigation article	Mathieu Ngudjolo Chui	6 July 2007	—	3	6	—	6 February 2008; 11 February 2008	27 June–18 July 2008 confirmed 26 September 2008	24 November 2009 – 23 May 2012 acquitted 18 December 2012	21 October 2014 acquittal confirmed 27 February 2015	Acquitted; decision final	
Democratic Republic of the Congo; Investigation article	Callixte Mbarushimana	28 September 2010	—	5	6	—	25 January 2011; 28 January 2011	16-21 September 2011 dismissed 16 December 2011			Proceedings finished with charges dismissed, released (Note: According to Article 61 (8) of the Rome Statute, "where the Pre-Trial Chamber declines to confirm a charge, the Prosecutor shall not be precluded from subsequently requesting its confirmation if the request is supported by additional evidence.")	
Democratic Republic of the Congo; Investigation article	Sylvestre Mudacumura	13 July 2012	—	—	9	—					Not in ICC custody; reportedly died on 17/18 September 2019	
Uganda; Investigation article	Joseph Kony	8 July 2005	—	12	21	—					Not in ICC custody	
Uganda; Investigation article	Okot Odhiambo	8 July 2005	—	3	7	—					Proceedings finished due to death	
Uganda; Investigation article	Raska Lukwiya	8 July 2005	—	1	3	—					Proceedings finished due to death	
Uganda; Investigation article	Vincent Otti	8 July 2005	—	11	21	—					Proceedings finished due to death	
Uganda; Investigation article	Dominic Ongwen	8 July 2005	—	3	4	—	21 January 2015; 26 January 2015	21–27 January 2016 confirmed 23 March 2016	6 December 2016 – 12 March 2020 convicted 4 February 2021 sentenced 6 May 2021	14-18 February 2022 verdict and sentence confirmed 15 December 2022	Convicted and sentenced to 25 years of imprisonment; decision final; in custody of Norwegian authorities, release between 2031 and 2040	(Note: Article 110 (3) of the Rome Statute of the International Court states that "[w]hen the person has served two thirds of the sentence, or 25 years in the case of life imprisonment, the Court shall review the sentence to determine whether it should be reduced. Such a review shall not be conducted before that time." Article 78 (3) of the Rome Statute specifies that "[i]n imposing a sentence of imprisonment, the Court shall deduct the time, if any, previously spent in detention in accordance with an order of the Court. The Court may deduct any time otherwise spent in detention in connection with conduct underlying the crime." The Court's Trial Chamber IX determined in its sentencing decision that the time since 4 January 2015 is to be deducted from the sentence. Thus, Dominic Ongwen is to be released on or before 4 January 2040. Starting from 4 January 2015, two-thirds of twenty-five years (sixteen years, eight months) will elapse on 4 September 2031.)
Central African Republic	Jean-Pierre Bemba	23 May 2008; 10 June 2008	—	3	5	—	3 July 2008; 4 July 2008	12-15 January 2009 confirmed 15 June 2009	22 November 2010 – 13 November 2014 convicted 21 March 2016 sentenced 21 June 2016	9-16 January 2018 acquitted 8 June 2018	Acquitted; decision final	
Central African Republic	Jean-Pierre Bemba	20 November 2013	—	—	—	2	23 November 2013; 27 November 2013	in writing confirmed 11 November 2014	29 September 2015 – 2 June 2016 convicted 19 October 2016 sentenced 22 March 2017 partially re-sentenced upon appeal 17 September 2018	Verdicts modified and re-sentencing partially remanded to Trial Chamber; 8 March 2018 re-sentencing confirmed 27 November 2019	Convicted and sentenced to one year of imprisonment and a fine of 300,000 USD; decision final; sentence served	
Central African Republic	Aimé Kilolo Musamba	20 November 2013	—	—	—	2	25 November 2013; 27 November 2013	in writing confirmed 11 November 2014	29 September 2015 – 2 June 2016 convicted 19 October 2016 sentenced 22 March 2017 partially re-sentenced upon appeal 17 September 2018	Verdicts modified and re-sentencing partially remanded to Trial Chamber; 8 March 2018 re-sentencing confirmed 27 November 2019	Convicted and sentenced to a fine of 30,000 USD; decision final	
Central African Republic	Fidèle Babala Wandu	20 November 2013	—	—	—	2	25 November 2013; 27 November 2013	in writing confirmed 11 November 2014	29 September 2015 – 2 June 2016 convicted 19 October 2016 sentenced 22 March 2017 partially re-sentenced upon appeal 17 September 2018	Verdicts modified and re-sentencing partially remanded to Trial Chamber; 8 March 2018 re-sentencing confirmed 27 November 2019	Convicted and sentenced to six months of imprisonment; decision final; sentence served	
Central African Republic	Jean-Jacques Mangenda Kabongo	20 November 2013	—	—	—	2	4 December 2013; 5 December 2013	in writing confirmed 11 November 2014	29 September 2015 – 2 June 2016 convicted 19 October 2016 sentenced 22 March 2017 partially re-sentenced upon appeal 17 September 2018	Verdicts modified and re-sentencing partially remanded to Trial Chamber; 8 March 2018 re-sentencing confirmed 27 November 2019	Convicted and sentenced to eleven months of imprisonment; decision final; sentence served	
Central African Republic	Narcisse Arido	20 November 2013	—	—	—	2	18 March 2014; 20 March 2014	in writing confirmed 11 November 2014	29 September 2015 – 2 June 2016 convicted 19 October 2016 sentenced 22 March 2017 partially re-sentenced upon appeal 17 September 2018	Verdicts modified and re-sentencing partially remanded to Trial Chamber; 8 March 2018 re-sentencing confirmed 27 November 2019	Convicted and sentenced to eleven months of imprisonment; decision final; sentence served	
Darfur, Sudan; Investigation article	Ahmed Haroun	27 April 2007	—	20	22	—					Not in ICC custody	
Darfur, Sudan; Investigation article	Ali Muhammad Ali Abd-Al-Rahman	27 April 2007	—	22	28	—	9 June 2020; 15 June 2020	24-26 May 2021 confirmed 9 July 2021	5 April 2022 –13 December 2024 convicted 6 October 2025 sentenced 9 December 2025		In ICC custody, convicted and sentenced to 20 years imprisonment, appeals possible; if conviction and sentence stand, to be released between 2033 and 2040	(Note: Article 110 (3) of the Rome Statute of the International Court states that "[w]hen the person has served two thirds of the sentence, or 25 years in the case of life imprisonment, the Court shall review the sentence to determine whether it should be reduced. Such a review shall not be conducted before that time." Article 78 (3) of the Rome Statute specifies that "[i]n imposing a sentence of imprisonment, the Court shall deduct the time, if any, previously spent in detention in accordance with an order of the Court. The Court may deduct any time otherwise spent in detention in connection with conduct underlying the crime." The Court's Trial Chamber I determined in its sentencing decision that the time since 9 June 2020 is to be deducted from the sentence. Thus, if conviction and sentence stand, Ali Muhammad Ali Abd-Al-Rahman is to be released on or before 9 June 2040. Starting from 9 June 2020, two-thirds of twenty years (13 years and four months) will elapse on 9 October 2033.)
Darfur, Sudan; Investigation article	Omar al-Bashir	4 March 2009; 12 July 2010	3	5	2	—					Not in ICC custody	
Darfur, Sudan; Investigation article	Bahr Idriss Abu Garda	7 May 2009 (summons)	—	—	3	—	18 May 2009	19-29 October 2009 dismissed 8 February 2010			Proceedings finished with charges dismissed	
Darfur, Sudan; Investigation article	Abdallah Banda	27 August 2009 (summons); 11 September 2014 (warrant of arrest)	—	—	3	—	17 June 2010	8 December 2010 confirmed 7 March 2011			Proceedings finished with confirmed charges withdrawn before trial	
Darfur, Sudan; Investigation article	Saleh Jerbo	27 August 2009 (summons)	—	—	3	—	17 June 2010	8 December 2010 confirmed 7 March 2011			Proceedings finished due to death	
Darfur, Sudan; Investigation article	Abdel Raheem Muhammad Hussein	1 March 2012	—	7	6	—					Not in ICC custody	
Kenya; Investigation article	William Ruto	8 March 2011 (summons)	—	4	—	—	7 April 2011	1-8 September 2011 confirmed 23 January 2012	10 September 2013 – 5 April 2016 (terminated)		Proceedings terminated without prejudice to re-prosecution	
Kenya; Investigation article	Joshua Sang	8 March 2011 (summons)	—	4	—	—	7 April 2011	1-8 September 2011 confirmed 23 January 2012	10 September 2013 – 5 April 2016 (terminated)		Proceedings terminated without prejudice to re-prosecution	
Kenya; Investigation article	Henry Kosgey	8 March 2011 (summons)	—	4	—	—	7 April 2011	1-8 September 2011 dismissed 23 January 2012			Proceedings finished with charges dismissed	
Kenya; Investigation article	Francis Muthaura	8 March 2011 (summons)	—	5	—	—	8 April 2011	21 September – 5 October 2011 confirmed 23 January 2012			Proceedings finished with confirmed charges withdrawn before trial	
Kenya; Investigation article	Uhuru Kenyatta	8 March 2011 (summons)	—	5	—	—	8 April 2011	21 September – 5 October 2011 confirmed 23 January 2012			Proceedings finished with confirmed charges withdrawn before trial	
Kenya; Investigation article	Mohammed Hussein Ali	8 March 2011 (summons)	—	5	—	—	8 April 2011	21 September – 5 October 2011 dismissed 23 January 2012			Proceedings finished with charges dismissed	
Kenya; Investigation article	Walter Barasa	2 August 2013	—	—	—	3					Not in ICC custody	
Kenya; Investigation article	Paul Gicheru	10 March 2015	—	—	—	6	3 November 2020; 6 November 2020	confirmed 15 July 2021	15 February 2022 – 27 June 2022		Proceedings finished due to death	
Kenya; Investigation article	Philip Kipkoech Bett	10 March 2015	—	—	—	4					Not in ICC custody	
Libya; Investigation article	Muammar Gaddafi	27 June 2011	—	2	—	—					Proceedings finished due to death	
Libya; Investigation article	Saif al-Islam Gaddafi	27 June 2011	—	2	—	—					Not in ICC custody	
Libya; Investigation article	Abdullah Senussi	27 June 2011	—	2	—	—					Proceedings finished with case held inadmissible	
Libya; Investigation article	Al-Tuhamy Mohamed Khaled	18 April 2013	—	4	3	—					Proceedings finished due to death	
Libya; Investigation article	Mahmoud al-Werfalli	15 August 2017; 4 July 2018	—	—	7	—					Proceedings finished due to death	
Libya; Investigation article	Saif Suleiman Sneidel	10 November 2020	—	—	3	—					Not in ICC custody	
Libya; Investigation article	Abdulrahem Al Kani	6 April 2023	—	—	4	—					Not in ICC custody	
Libya; Investigation article	Makhlouf Douma	6 April 2023	—	—	4	—					Not in ICC custody	
Libya; Investigation article	Nasser Al Lahsa	6 April 2023	—	—	4	—					Not in ICC custody	
Libya; Investigation article	Mohamed Salheen	6 April 2023	—	—	6	—					Not in ICC custody	
Libya; Investigation article	Abdelbari Al Shaqaqi	18 July 2023	—	—	4	—					Not in ICC custody	
Libya; Investigation article	Fathi Al Zinkal	18 July 2023	—	—	6	—					Not in ICC custody	
Libya; Investigation article	Osama Elmasry Njeem	18 January 2025	—	6	6	—					Not in ICC custody	
Libya; Investigation article	Khaled Mohamed Ali El Hishri	10 July 2025	—	11	6	—	1 December 2025; 3 December 2025	19–21 May 2026 confirmed 16 July 2026	scheduled to begin 4 May 2027		In ICC custody, charges confirmed	
Ivory Coast	Laurent Gbagbo	23 November 2011	—	4	—	—	30 November 2011; 5 December 2011	19–28 February 2013 confirmed 12 June 2014	28 January 2016 – 15 January 2019 acquitted 15 January 2019	22–24 June 2020; Acquittal confirmed 31 March 2021	Acquitted; decision final	
Ivory Coast	Charles Blé Goudé	21 December 2011	—	4	—	—	22–23 March 2014; 27 March 2014	29 September – 2 October 2014 confirmed 11 December 2014	28 January 2016 – 15 January 2019 acquitted 15 January 2019	22–24 June 2020; Acquittal confirmed 31 March 2021	Acquitted; decision final	
Ivory Coast	Simone Gbagbo	29 February 2012	—	4	—	—					Proceedings finished with charges withdrawn	
Mali; Investigation article	Ahmad al-Faqi al-Mahdi	18 September 2015	—	—	1	—	26 September 2015; 30 September 2015	1 March 2016 confirmed 24 March 2016	22–24 August 2016 convicted and sentenced 27 September 2016		Convicted and sentenced to nine years imprisonment; decision final; reparations regime established; ICC-related sentence served (after seven years)	
Mali; Investigation article	Iyad Ag Ghaly	18 July 2017	—	6	4	—					Not in ICC custody	
Mali; Investigation article	Al Hassan Ag Abdoul Aziz	27 March 2018	—	4	4	—	31 March 2018; 4 April 2018	8–17 July 2019 confirmed 30 September 2019	14 July 2020 – 25 May 2023 convicted 26 June 2024 sentenced 20 November 2024	Appeals by Prosecution and Defence discontinued	Convicted and sentenced to 10 years of imprisonment; decision final; set to be released in 2027	(Note: Article 110 (3) of the Rome Statute of the International Court states that "[w]hen the person has served two thirds of the sentence, or 25 years in the case of life imprisonment, the Court shall review the sentence to determine whether it should be reduced. Such a review shall not be conducted before that time." Article 78 (3) of the Rome Statute specifies that "[i]n imposing a sentence of imprisonment, the Court shall deduct the time, if any, previously spent in detention in accordance with an order of the Court. The Court may deduct any time otherwise spent in detention in connection with conduct underlying the crime." The Court's Trial Chamber X determined in its sentencing decision that the time since 28 March 2018 is to be deducted from the sentence. Thus, Al Hassan Ag Abdoul Aziz is to be released on or before 28 March 2028. Starting from 28 March 2018, two-thirds of ten years (six years, eight months) elapsed on 28 November 2024. On 23 July 2025, a panel of the Appeals Chamber decided that the sentence is set to be completed on 28 March 2027.)
Central African Republic II	Alfred Yekatom	11 November 2018	—	6	7	—	17 November 2018; 23 November 2018	19 September 2019 – 11 October 2019 confirmed 11 December 2019	16 February 2021 – 12 December 2024 convicted and sentenced 24 July 2025		In ICC custody, convicted and sentenced to 15 years imprisonment, appeals possible; if conviction and sentence stand, to be released between 2028 and 2033	(Note: Article 110 (3) of the Rome Statute of the International Court states that "[w]hen the person has served two thirds of the sentence, or 25 years in the case of life imprisonment, the Court shall review the sentence to determine whether it should be reduced. Such a review shall not be conducted before that time." Article 78 (3) of the Rome Statute specifies that "[i]n imposing a sentence of imprisonment, the Court shall deduct the time, if any, previously spent in detention in accordance with an order of the Court. The Court may deduct any time otherwise spent in detention in connection with conduct underlying the crime." The Court's Trial Chamber V determined in its sentencing decision that the time since 17 November 2018 is to be deducted from the sentence. Thus, if conviction and sentence stand, Alfred Yekatom is to be released on or before 17 November 2033. Starting from 17 November 2018, two-thirds of fifteen years (ten years) will elapse on 17 November 2028.) (Note: Article 110 (3) of the Rome Statute of the International Court states that "[w]hen the person has served two thirds of the sentence, or 25 years in the case of life imprisonment, the Court shall review the sentence to determine whether it should be reduced. Such a review shall not be conducted before that time." Article 78 (3) of the Rome Statute specifies that "[i]n imposing a sentence of imprisonment, the Court shall deduct the time, if any, previously spent in detention in accordance with an order of the Court. The Court may deduct any time otherwise spent in detention in connection with conduct underlying the crime." The Court's Trial Chamber V determined in its sentencing decision that the time since 12 December 2018 is to be deducted from the sentence. Thus, if conviction and sentence stand, Patrice-Edouard Ngaïssona is to be released on or before 12 December 2030. Starting from 12 December 2018, two-thirds of twelve years (eight years) will elapse on 12 December 2026.)
Central African Republic II	Patrice-Edouard Ngaïssona	7 December 2018	—	7	9	—	23 January 2019; 25 January 2019	19 September 2019 – 11 October 2019 confirmed 11 December 2019	16 February 2021 – 12 December 2024 convicted and sentenced 24 July 2025		In ICC custody, convicted and sentenced to 12 years imprisonment, appeals possible; if conviction and sentence stand, to be released between 2026 and 2030	
Central African Republic II	Edmond Beina	7 December 2018	—	4	6	—					Proceedings finished with case held inadmissible, appeal possible	
Central African Republic II	Maxime Mokom	10 December 2018	—	9	13	—	14 March 2022; 22 March 2022	22–24 August 2023			Proceedings finished with charges withdrawn	
Central African Republic II	Mahamat Said Abdel Kani	7 January 2019	—	8	6	—	24 January 2021; 28–29 January 2021	12–14 October 2021 confirmed 9 December 2021	26 September 2022 – 26 November 2025 convicted 23 September 2026		In ICC custody, convicted, sentencing pending	
Central African Republic II	Noureddine Adam	7 January 2019	—	5	1	—					Not in ICC custody	
Georgia; Investigation article	Mikhail Mindzaev	24 June 2022	—	—	5	—					Not in ICC custody	
Georgia; Investigation article	Gamlet Guchmazov	24 June 2022	—	—	5	—					Not in ICC custody	
Georgia; Investigation article	David Sanakoev	24 June 2022	—	—	2	—					Not in ICC custody	
Burundi											Investigation initiated	
Bangladesh/Myanmar; Investigation article											Investigation initiated	
Afghanistan; Investigation article	Haibatullah Akhundzada	8 July 2025	—	1	—	—					Not in ICC custody	
Afghanistan; Investigation article	Abdul Hakim Haqqani	8 July 2025	—	1	—	—					Not in ICC custody	
Afghanistan; Investigation article	Habibullah Agha	9 September 2025	—	1	—	—					Not in ICC custody	
Afghanistan; Investigation article	Neda Mohammad Nadeem	9 September 2025	—	1	—	—					Not in ICC custody	
Palestine; Investigation article Arrest warrants article	Mohammed Deif	21 November 2024	—	5	3	—					Proceedings finished due to death	
Palestine; Investigation article Arrest warrants article	Yoav Gallant	21 November 2024	—	3	4	—					Not in ICC custody	
Palestine; Investigation article Arrest warrants article	Benjamin Netanyahu	21 November 2024	—	3	4	—					Not in ICC custody	
Philippines; Investigation article	Rodrigo Duterte	7 March 2025	—	3	—	—	12 March 2025; 14 March 2025	23–27 February 2026 confirmed 23 April 2026	scheduled to begin 30 November 2026		In ICC custody, charges confirmed	
Philippines; Investigation article	Ronald dela Rosa	6 November 2025	—	1	—	—					Not in ICC custody	
Venezuela I Investigation article											Investigation initiated	
Ukraine; Investigation article Arrest warrants article	Vladimir Putin	17 March 2023	—	—	2	—					Not in ICC custody	
Ukraine; Investigation article Arrest warrants article	Maria Lvova-Belova	17 March 2023	—	—	2	—					Not in ICC custody	
Ukraine; Investigation article Arrest warrants article	Viktor Sokolov	5 March 2024	—	1	2	—					Not in ICC custody	
Ukraine; Investigation article Arrest warrants article	Sergey Kobylash	5 March 2024	—	1	2	—					Not in ICC custody	
Ukraine; Investigation article Arrest warrants article	Sergei Shoigu	24 June 2024	—	1	2	—					Not in ICC custody	
Ukraine; Investigation article Arrest warrants article	Valery Gerasimov	24 June 2024	—	1	2	—					Not in ICC custody	
Lithuania/Belarus											Investigation initiated	

== Relationships ==
=== United Nations ===
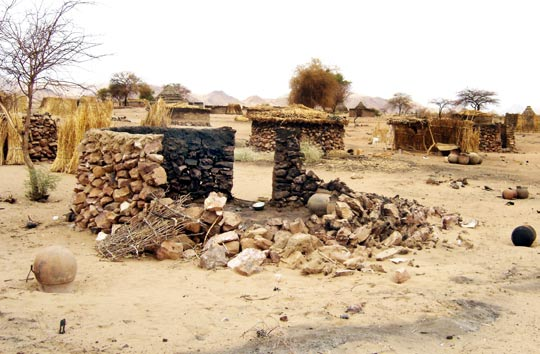
The UN Security Council referred the situation in Darfur to the ICC in 2005.

Unlike the International Court of Justice, the ICC is legally independent from the United Nations. The Rome Statute grants certain powers to the United Nations Security Council, which limit its functional independence. Article 13 allows the Security Council to refer to the Court situations that would not otherwise fall under the Court's jurisdiction (as it did in relation to the situations in Darfur and Libya, which the Court could not otherwise have prosecuted as neither Sudan nor Libya are state parties). Article 16 allows the Security Council to require the Court to defer from investigating a case for a period of twelve months. Such a deferral may be renewed indefinitely by the Security Council. This sort of an arrangement gives the ICC some of the advantages inhering in the organs of the United Nations such as using the enforcement powers of the Security Council, but it also creates a risk of being tainted with the political controversies of the Security Council.

The Court cooperates with the UN in many different areas, including the exchange of information and logistical support. The Court reports to the UN each year on its activities, and some meetings of the Assembly of States Parties are held at UN facilities. The relationship between the Court and the UN is governed by a "Relationship Agreement between the International Criminal Court and the United Nations".

=== Nongovernmental organisations ===
During the 1970s and 1980s, international human rights and humanitarian Nongovernmental Organisations (or NGOs) began to proliferate at exponential rates. Concurrently, the quest to find a way to punish international crimes shifted from being the exclusive responsibility of legal experts to being shared with international human rights activism.

NGOs helped birth the ICC through advocacy and championing for the prosecution of perpetrators of crimes against humanity. NGOs closely monitor the organisation's declarations and actions, ensuring that the work that is being executed on behalf of the ICC is fulfilling its objectives and responsibilities to civil society. According to Benjamin Schiff, "From the Statute Conference onward, the relationship between the ICC and the NGOs has probably been closer, more consistent, and more vital to the Court than have analogous relations between NGOs and any other international organisation."

There are a number of NGOs working on a variety of issues related to the ICC. The NGO Coalition for the International Criminal Court has served as a sort of umbrella for NGOs to coordinate with each other on similar objectives related to the ICC. The CICC has 2,500 member organisations in 150 countries. The original steering committee included representatives from the World Federalist Movement, the International Commission of Jurists, Amnesty International, the Lawyers Committee for Human Rights, Human Rights Watch, Parliamentarians for Global Action, and No Peace Without Justice. Today, many of the NGOs with which the ICC cooperates are members of the CICC. These organisations come from a range of backgrounds, spanning from major international NGOs such as Human Rights Watch and Amnesty International, to smaller, more local organisations focused on peace and justice missions. Many work closely with states, such as the International Criminal Law Network, founded and predominantly funded by the Hague municipality and the Dutch Ministries of Defence and Foreign Affairs. The CICC also claims organisations that are themselves federations, such as the International Federation of Human Rights Leagues (FIDH).

CICC members subscribe to three principles that permit them to work under the umbrella of the CICC, so long as their objectives match them:

- Promoting worldwide ratification and implementation of the Rome Statute of the ICC
- Maintaining the integrity of the Rome Statute of the ICC, and
- Ensuring the ICC will be as fair, effective and independent as possible

The NGOs that work under the CICC do not normally pursue agendas exclusive to the work of the Court, rather they may work for broader causes, such as general human rights issues, victims' rights, gender rights, rule of law, conflict mediation, and peace. The CICC coordinates their efforts to improve the efficiency of NGOs' contributions to the Court and to pool their influence on major common issues. From the ICC side, it has been useful to have the CICC channel NGO contacts with the Court so that its officials do not have to interact individually with thousands of separate organisations.

NGOs have been crucial to the evolution of the ICC, as they assisted in the creation of the normative climate that urged states to seriously consider the Court's formation. Their legal experts helped shape the Statute, while their lobbying efforts built support for it. They advocate Statute ratification globally and work at expert and political levels within member states for passage of necessary domestic legislation. NGOs are greatly represented at meetings for the Assembly of States Parties, and they use the ASP meetings to press for decisions promoting their priorities. Many of these NGOs have reasonable access to important officials at the ICC because of their involvement during the Statute process. They are engaged in monitoring, commenting upon, and assisting in the ICC's activities.

The ICC often depends on NGOs to interact with local populations. The Registry Public Information Office personnel and Victims Participation and Reparations Section officials hold seminars for local leaders, professionals and the media to spread the word about the Court. These are the kinds of events that are often hosted or organised by local NGOs. Because there can be challenges with determining which of these NGOs are legitimate, CICC regional representatives often have the ability to help screen and identify trustworthy organisations.

NGOs are also "sources of criticism, exhortation and pressure upon" the ICC. The ICC heavily depends on NGOs for its operations. Although NGOs and states cannot directly impact the judicial nucleus of the organisation, they can impart information on crimes, can help locate victims and witnesses, and can promote and organise victim participation. NGOs outwardly comment on the Court's operations, "push for expansion of its activities especially in the new justice areas of outreach in conflict areas, in victims' participation and reparations, and in upholding due-process standards and defence 'equality of arms' and so implicitly set an agenda for the future evolution of the ICC." The relatively uninterrupted progression of NGO involvement with the ICC may mean that NGOs have become repositories of more institutional historical knowledge about the ICC than its national representatives, and have greater expertise than some of the organisation's employees themselves. While NGOs look to mould the ICC to satisfy the interests and priorities that they have worked for since the early 1990s, they unavoidably press against the limits imposed upon the ICC by the states that are members of the organisation. NGOs can pursue their own mandates, irrespective of whether they are compatible with those of other NGOs, while the ICC must respond to the complexities of its own mandate as well as those of the states and NGOs.

Another issue has been that NGOs possess "exaggerated senses of their ownership over the organisation and, having been vital to and successful in promoting the Court, were not managing to redefine their roles to permit the Court its necessary independence." Additionally, because there does exist such a gap between the large human rights organisations and the smaller peace-oriented organisations, it is difficult for ICC officials to manage and gratify all of their NGOs. "ICC officials recognize that the NGOs pursue their own agendas, and that they will seek to pressure the ICC in the direction of their own priorities rather than necessarily understanding or being fully sympathetic to the myriad constraints and pressures under which the Court operates." Both the ICC and the NGO community avoid criticising each other publicly or vehemently, although NGOs have released advisory and cautionary messages regarding the ICC. They avoid taking stances that could potentially give the Court's adversaries, particularly the U.S., more motive to berate the organisation.

== Criticism ==
=== Impartiality ===
The International Criminal Court is often "critiqued for being selective, or imperialistic, or reflecting the geopolitical interests of powerful states," says Sarah Knuckey, a Columbia law professor. While many Western countries supported the arrest warrant for Russian President Putin, how they respond to the warrant against Israel's Netanyahu will be "a test of the genuineness of their commitment to international justice for all".

Human Rights Watch (HRW) reported that the ICC's prosecutor team takes no account of the roles played by the government in the conflict of Uganda, Rwanda or Congo. This led to a flawed investigation, because the ICC did not reach the conclusion of its verdict after considering the governments' position and actions in the conflict.

Concerning the independent Office of Public Counsel for the Defence (OPCD), Thomas Lubanga's defence team say they were given a smaller budget than the prosecutor and that evidence and witness statements were slow to arrive.

=== Unintentional consequences ===
Research indicates that prosecutions of leaders who are culpable of international crimes in the ICC make them less likely to peacefully step down, which can prolong conflicts and incentivise them to make continued use of mass violence. It is also argued that there is little evidence that international criminal prosecution practically fosters peace: "the ICC has been used as a means of intervention in ongoing conflicts with the expectation that the indictments, arrests, and trials of elite perpetrators have deterrence and preventive effects for atrocity crimes. Despite these legitimate intentions and great expectations, there is little evidence of the efficacy of justice as a means to peace".

=== State cooperation ===
That the ICC cannot mount successful cases without state cooperation is problematic for several reasons. It means that the ICC acts inconsistently in its selection of cases, is prevented from taking on hard cases and loses legitimacy. It also gives the ICC less deterrent value, as potential perpetrators of war crimes know that they can avoid ICC judgment by taking over government and refusing to cooperate.

=== Principle of complementarity ===
The Rome Statute's principle of complementarity (that the Court will only prosecute if states are unwilling or unable to) is often taken for granted in the legal analysis of international criminal law and its jurisprudence. Initially the thorny issue of the actual application of the complementarity principle arose in 2008, when William Schabas published his influential paper. No substantive research was made by other scholars on this issue for quite some time. In June 2017, Victor Tsilonis advanced the same criticism which is reinforced by events, practices of the Office of the Prosecutor and ICC cases in the Essays in Honour of Nestor Courakis. His paper essentially argues that the Αl‐Senussi case arguably is the first instance of the complementarity principle's actual implementation eleven whole years after the ratification of the Rome Statute of the International Criminal Court.

On the other hand, in 2017, Chief Prosecutor Fatou Bensouda invoked the principle of complementarity in the situation between Russia and Georgia in the Ossetia region. Moreover, following the threats of certain African states (initially Burundi, Gambia and South Africa) to withdraw their ratifications, Bensouda again referred to the principle of complementarity as a core principle of the ICC's jurisdiction and has more extensively focused in the principle's application on the latest Office of The Prosecutor's Report on Preliminary Examination Activities 2016.

Some advocates have suggested that the ICC go "beyond complementarity" and systematically support national capacity for prosecutions. They argue that national prosecutions, where possible, are more cost-effective, preferable to victims and more sustainable.

=== Jurisdiction over corporations ===
There is a debate on whether the ICC should have jurisdiction over corporations that violate international law. Supporters argue that corporations can and do commit human rights violations, such as war crimes linked to raw materials in conflict zones. Critics argue that prosecuting corporations would compromise the principle of complementarity, that it would give corporations excessive power under international law, or that it would compromise voluntary initiatives by companies. John Ruggie has argued that jurisdiction of corporations under international law should be limited to international crimes, while Nicolás Carrillo-Santarelli of La Sabana University argues that it should cover all human rights violations.

Despite its lack of jurisdiction, the ICC announced in 2016 that it would prioritise criminal cases linked to land grabbing, illegal resource extraction, or environmental degradation caused by corporate activity. The proposed crime of ecocide would have jurisdiction over corporations as well as governments. Supporters of criminalising ecocide argue that it would shift the ICC's priorities away from Africa, since most environmental degradation is caused by states and corporations in the Global North.

== State reactions and criticism ==
=== African states ===
In October 2016, after repeated claims that the court was biased against African states, Burundi, South Africa and the Gambia announced their withdrawals from the Rome Statute. Following Gambia's presidential election later that year, which ended the long rule of Yahya Jammeh, Gambia rescinded its withdrawal notification. A decision by the High Court of South Africa in early 2017 ruled that the attempted withdrawal was unconstitutional, as it had not been agreed by Parliament, prompting the South African government to inform the UN that it was revoking its decision to withdraw.

=== African accusations of Western imperialism ===
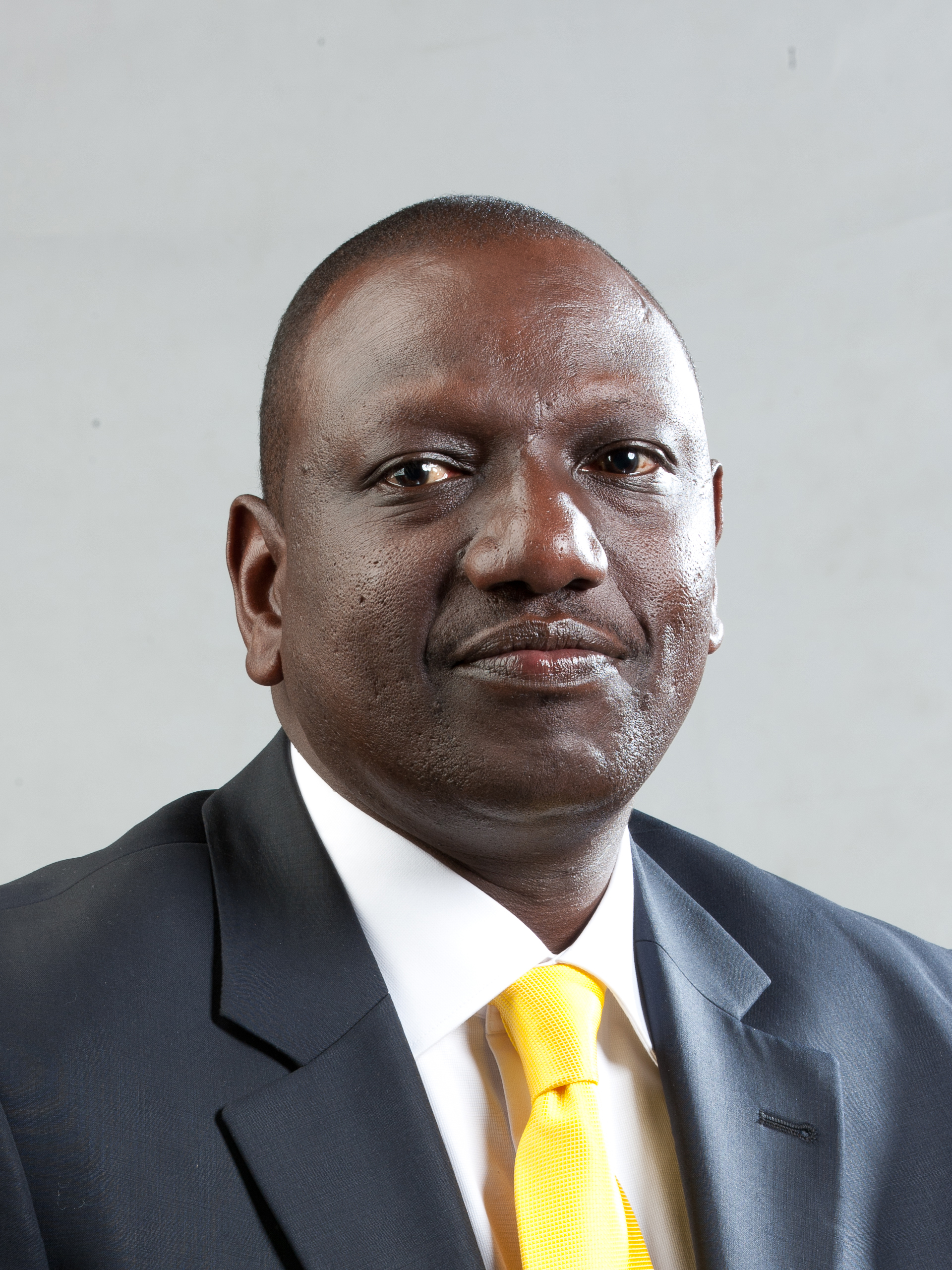
Kenyan politician William Ruto in February 2013

The ICC has been accused of bias and of being a tool of Western imperialism, only punishing leaders from small, weak states while ignoring crimes committed by richer and more powerful states. This sentiment has been expressed particularly by African leaders due to an alleged disproportionate focus of the Court on Africa, while it claims to have a global mandate. Until January 2016, all nine situations which the ICC had been investigating were in African countries.

African critics have suggested the ICC is acting as a neocolonial force seeking to further empower Western political and extractive interests in Africa. Scholar Awol Allo has described the court's underlying problem that has led to these challenges with Africa as not overt racism, but Eurocentrism. Another analysis suggests that African states are motivated by concerns over Africa's place in the world order: the problem is the sovereign inequality displayed by the ICC prosecutor's focus.

The prosecution of Kenyan Deputy President William Ruto and President Uhuru Kenyatta (both charged before coming into office) led to the Kenyan parliament passing a motion calling for Kenya's withdrawal from the ICC, and the country called on the other 33 African states party to the ICC to withdraw their support, an issue which was discussed at a special African Union (AU) summit in October 2013.

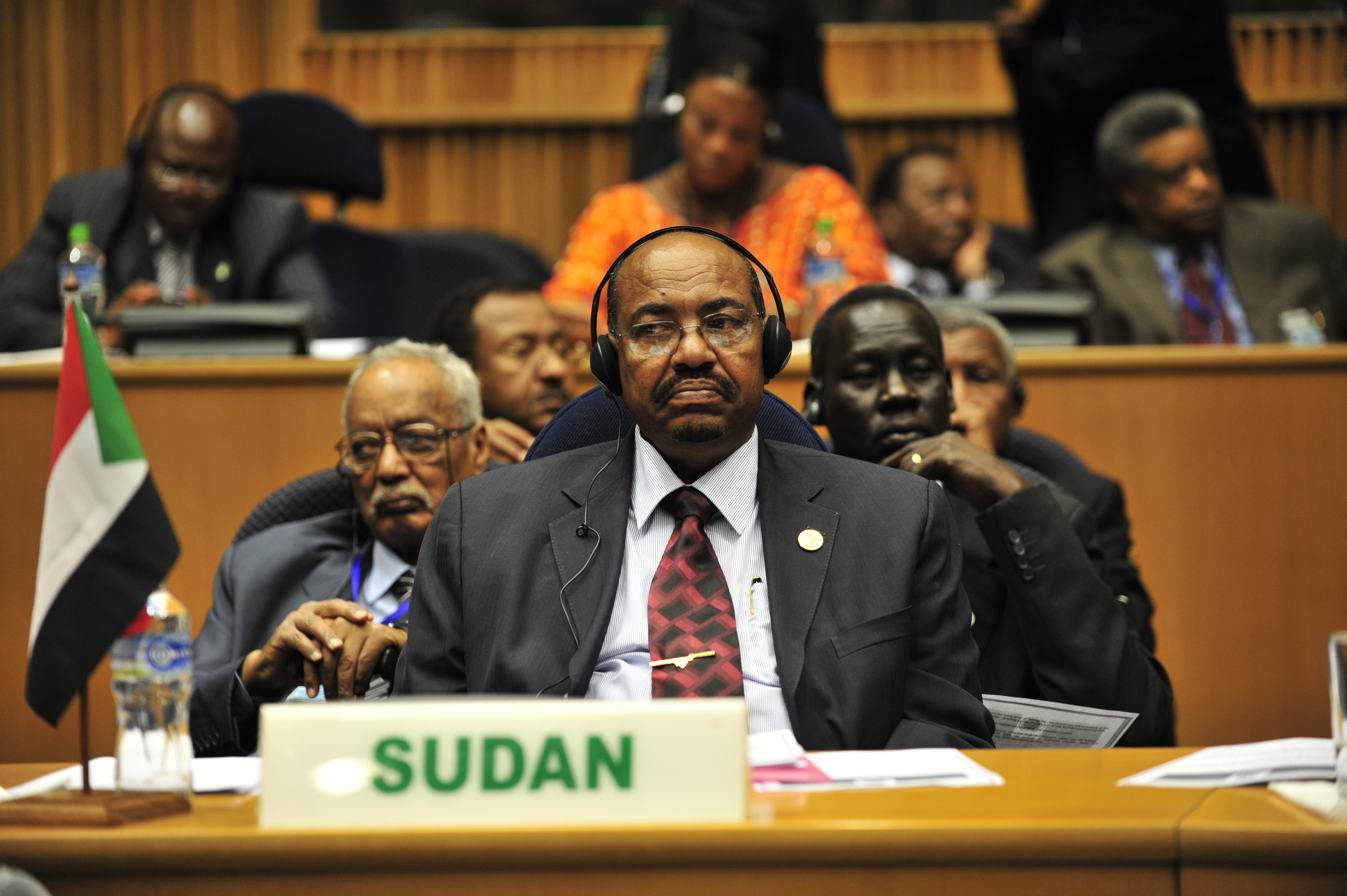
The ICC issued an arrest warrant for Omar al-Bashir of Sudan over alleged war crimes in Darfur.

Sudanese President Omar al-Bashir visited Kenya, South Africa, China, Nigeria, Saudi Arabia, United Arab Emirates, Egypt, Ethiopia, Qatar and several other countries despite an outstanding ICC warrant for his arrest but was not arrested; he said that the charges against him are "exaggerated" and that the ICC was a part of a "Western plot" against him. Ivory Coast's government opted not to transfer former first lady Simone Gbagbo to the court but to instead try her at home. Rwanda's ambassador to the African Union, Joseph Nsengimana, argued that, "It is not only the case of Kenya. We have seen international justice become more and more a political matter." Ugandan President Yoweri Museveni accused the ICC of "mishandling complex African issues". Ethiopian Prime Minister Hailemariam Desalegn, at the time AU chairman, told the UN General Assembly at the General debate of the sixty-eighth session of the United Nations General Assembly: "The manner in which the ICC has been operating has left a very bad impression in Africa. It is totally unacceptable."

The ICC has denied the charge of disproportionately targeting African leaders and claims to stand up for victims wherever they may be.

=== African Union (AU) withdrawal proposal ===
South African President Jacob Zuma said the perceptions of the ICC as "unreasonable" led to the calling of the special AU summit on 13 October 2015. Botswana is a notable supporter of the ICC in Africa. At the summit, the AU did not endorse the proposal for a collective withdrawal from the ICC due to a lack of support for the idea. The summit concluded that serving heads of state should not be put on trial and that the Kenyan cases should be deferred. Ethiopian former Foreign Minister Tedros Adhanom said: "We have rejected the double standard that the ICC is applying in dispensing international justice." Despite these calls, the ICC went ahead with requiring William Ruto to attend his trial. The UNSC was then asked to consider deferring the trials of Kenyatta and Ruto for a year, but this was rejected. In November, the ICC's Assembly of State Parties responded to Kenya's calls for an exemption for sitting heads of state by agreeing to consider amendments to the Rome Statute to address the concerns.

On 7 October 2016, Burundi announced that it would leave the ICC after the court began investigating political violence in that nation. In the two weeks that followed, South Africa and The Gambia also announced their intention to leave the court, with Kenya and Namibia reportedly also considering departure. All three nations cited the fact that all 39 people indicted by the court over its history by that date had been African and that the court had made no effort to investigate war crimes tied to the 2003 invasion of Iraq. Following The Gambia's presidential election later that year, which ended the long rule of Yahya Jammeh, the new government rescinded its withdrawal notification. The High Court of South Africa ruled on 2 February 2017 that the South African government's notice to withdraw was unconstitutional and invalid. On 7 March 2017, the South African government formally revoked its intention to withdraw. The ruling ANC revealed on 5 July 2017 that its intention to withdraw stands.

=== Israel ===
In 2020, the +972 Magazine, based in Israel, reported political interference coming from Israel and the U.S. when Fatou Bensouda, the chief prosecutor of the International Criminal Court, announced that "there is legal basis to probe Israel and Palestinian groups over war crimes in the West Bank (including East Jerusalem) and the Gaza Strip, and that her office was ready to investigate the matter". In 2018, when the Israeli government wanted to demolish the West Bank village of Khan al Ahmar, Bensouda explicitly warned Israel that doing so could be considered a 'war crime'. The Israeli government's response was to publicly defy the court, describing the prosecutor's statement as 'pure anti-Semitism' in Netanyahu's words.

The Guardian reported in 2024, on the basis of anonymous sources, that Israel had conducted a nine-year "war" against the ICC. These sources alleged that Israeli intelligence agencies were used to "surveil, hack, pressure, smear and allegedly threaten senior ICC staff in an effort to derail the court's inquiries." In particular, Yossi Cohen, director of Mossad at the time, allegedly threatened Bensouda and her family in an attempt to dissuade her from opening war crime enquiries against Israel. The anonymous sources are said to be familiar with disclosures Bensouda made to the ICC regarding the operation.

In November 2024, after the ICC issued an arrest warrant for Israeli prime minister Benjamin Netanyahu and former defence minister Yoav Gallant on charges of war crimes and crimes against humanity during the Gaza war, Netanyahu accused the ICC of antisemitism, while Gallant argued the Court set "a dangerous precedent against the right to self-defence and ethical warfare and encourages murderous terrorism." In that same November, Israel appealed the ICC warrants against Netanyahu and Gallant.

In November 2024, France argued that the arrest warrants for Israeli leaders are not valid because Israel is not a member of the ICC. In that same month, then-Prime Minister of Canada, Justin Trudeau, announced that Canada would abide by the arrest warrants and arrest and deport Netanyahu if he entered that country. Italian Foreign Minister Antonio Tajani said on various occasions that Italy would not arrest Prime Minister Netanyahu. In January 2025, Polish prime minister Donald Tusk guaranteed safe passage for senior Israeli officials, including Israeli prime minister Benjamin Netanyahu, to an event in Poland marking the 80th anniversary of the liberation of Auschwitz. The majority of the Polish public disagreed with the government's decision not to arrest Netanyahu.

Germany's CDU leader Friedrich Merz criticised the ICC's decision to issue an arrest warrant for Netanyahu. In February 2025, one day after the 2025 German federal election, he announced his will to invite Netanyahu to Germany, "as an open challenge" to the decision of the ICC.

In April 2025, Netanyahu visited Hungary, a state party to the Rome Statute of the ICC. During the visit, Hungarian prime minister Viktor Orbán announced that it would withdraw from the ICC, describing it as "politically biased". The withdrawal, which would become effective after one year's written notice, would result in Hungary joining Israel, the U.S., Russia, China and North Korea among nations which do not recognise the ICC's jurisdiction. This move drew criticism from human rights organisations and strained Hungary's relations within the European Union, where all member states are ICC members. However, following the election of Prime Minister Péter Magyar in 2026, the new government revoked its withdrawal from the ICC, and remained a member.

=== Philippines ===
Following the announcement that the ICC would open a preliminary investigation on the Philippines in connection to its escalating drug war, President Rodrigo Duterte announced on 14 March 2018 that the Philippines would start to submit plans to withdraw, completing the process on 17 March 2019. The ICC pointed out that it retained jurisdiction over the Philippines during the period when it was a state party to the Rome Statute, from November 2011 to March 2019.

On 11 March 2025, Duterte was arrested on an ICC warrant pursuant to his role in the Philippine drug war and flown from Manila to The Hague. On 6 November 2025, the ICC also issued a secret arrest warrant against Duterte's erstwhile police chief, now Senator Ronald dela Rosa, charging him with the crime against humanity of repeated murder during the period between 1 November 2011, and 16 March 2019. On 11 May 2026, the arrest warrant was made public, and dela Rosa was placed on the international wanted list. The Senate refused to authorize his arrest, and an attempt to capture him in the Senate building itself on 13 May resulted in the Senate lockdown and a shootout, during which dela Rosa fled. President Bongbong Marcos's spokeswoman, while stating that there are "no plans yet" underway for the country's return within the Court, had communicated the previous day that the president still intended to apply national and international laws and that parliamentary guarantees are subject to limits. As of 23 May 2026, Senator dela Rosa was still a fugitive.

=== Qatar ===
In November 2025, The Guardian reported that Qatar had hired private intelligence firms, including the London-based Highgate, to undermine the credibility of an ICC official who accused Khan of sexually abusing her. According to The Guardian, the operation unsuccessfully attempted to find links between the accuser and Israel. It wrote that there was no evidence that Khan was involved, though his representatives met with those of Highgate. Highgate confirmed it had conducted an operation concerning the ICC but denied Qatari involvement.

=== Russia ===
On 17 March 2023, the ICC issued arrest warrants for Vladimir Putin, the president of Russia, and Maria Lvova-Belova, Russian commissioner for children's rights, alleging responsibility for the war crime of unlawful deportation and transfer of children during the Russo-Ukrainian War.

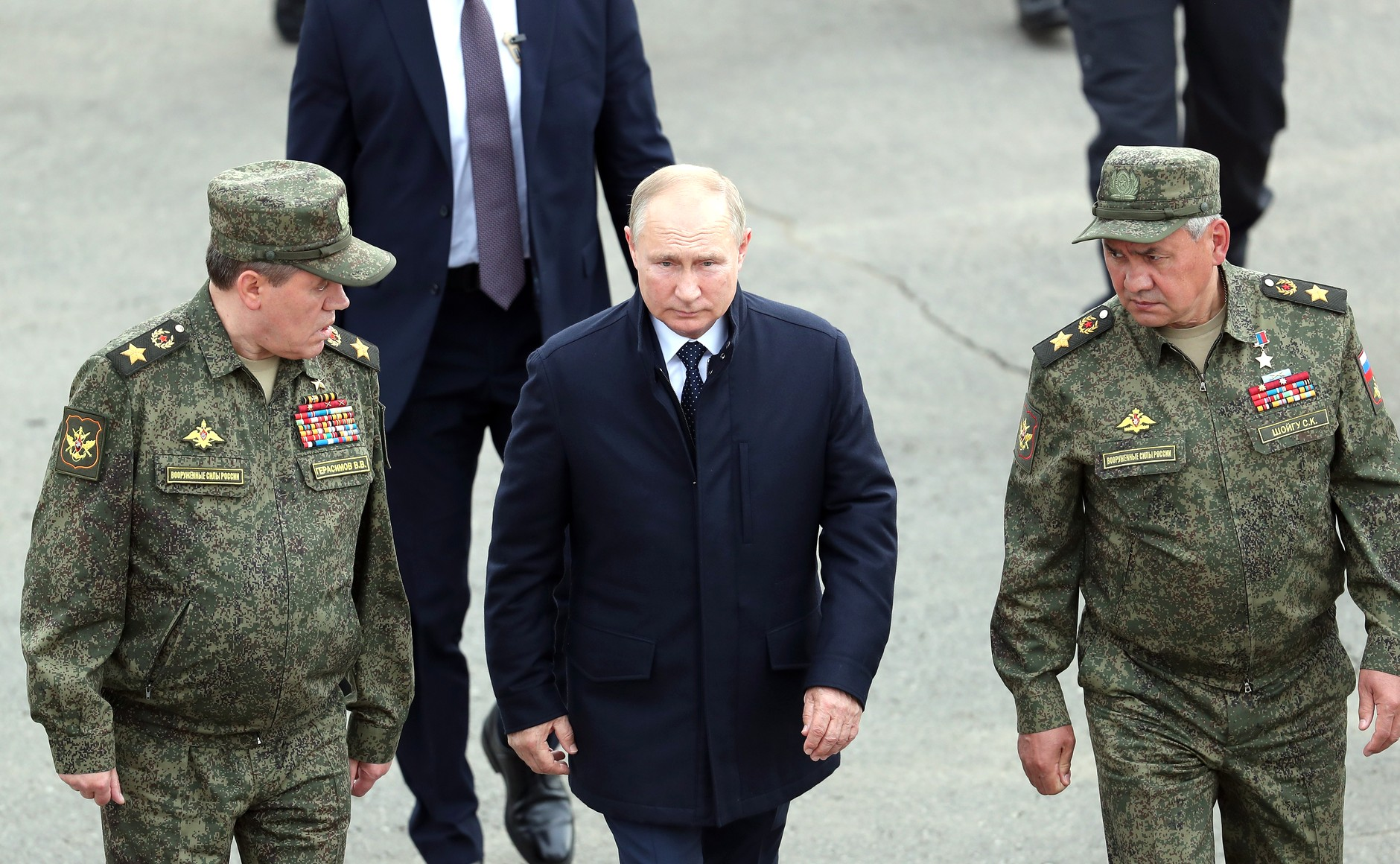
Three of the indicted individuals (left to right): Valery Gerasimov, Vladimir Putin and Sergei Shoigu observe military exercises in 2021

As of June 2024, the ICC has also issued arrest warrants for Viktor Sokolov, Sergey Kobylash, Sergei Shoigu and Valery Gerasimov, officers in the Russian military.

In March 2023, Kremlin spokesperson Dmitry Peskov announced that Russia did not recognise the Court's decision to issue an arrest warrant for President Vladimir Putin on account of war crimes in Ukraine and noted that Russia, like other countries which had not ratified the Rome Statute, did not recognise the jurisdiction of the ICC, saying, "And accordingly, any decisions of this kind are null and void for the Russian Federation from the point of view of law."

State Duma speaker Vyacheslav Volodin wrote on Telegram, "Yankees, hands off Putin!" calling the move evidence of Western "hysteria", and saying that "we regard any attacks on the President of the Russian Federation as aggression against our country".

South African Foreign Minister Naledi Pandor criticised the ICC for not having what she called an "evenhanded approach" to all leaders responsible for violations of international law. South Africa, which failed in its obligation to arrest visiting Sudanese President Omar al-Bashir in June 2015, invited Vladimir Putin to the 15th BRICS Summit in Durban. On 19 July 2023, South Africa announced that "by mutual agreement" Putin would not attend the summit. Foreign Minister Sergei Lavrov attended in Putin's place.

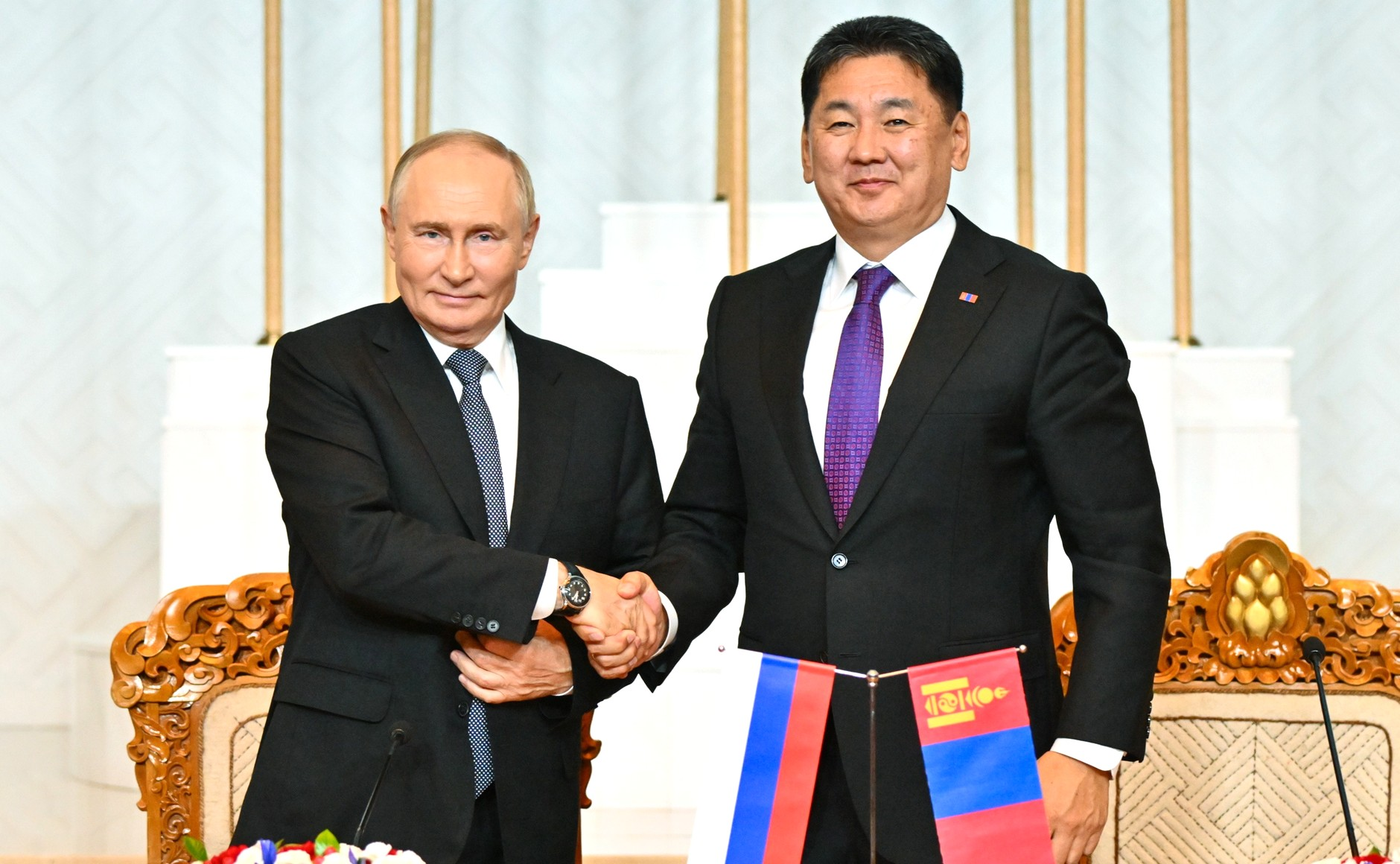
Putin with Mongolian President Ukhnaagiin Khürelsükh in Ulaanbaatar, Mongolia, 3 September 2024

In the months following the arrest warrant for Putin being issued, Russia issued warrants for the arrest of multiple ICC officials, including the court's president Piotr Hofmański and its vice-president Luz del Carmen Ibáñez Carranza. On 12 December 2025, a Moscow court sentenced to fifteen years in prison the aforementioned prosecutor Khan, the Italian vice-president of the Court, Salvatore Aitala, and seven other members of the panel that had issued the warrants against the Russian officials, who are therefore currently wanted by the Russian justice.

In advance of a visit by Putin to Mongolia on 3 September 2024, the ICC stated that Mongolia was obligated to place Putin under arrest, due to Mongolia being a signatory of the Rome Statute of the ICC. After failure to make the arrest, Mongolia was described by Ukraine as complicit in Putin's war crimes. Following the visit and the refusal to arrest Putin, the Mongolian government said that the issue of energy relations is critical to the country and that "Mongolia has always maintained a policy of neutrality in all its diplomatic relations, as demonstrated in our statements of record to date."

=== United States ===
United States president George W. Bush signed the American Service-Members' Protection Act (informally referred to as the Hague Invasion Act) to signify the United States' opposition to any possible future jurisdiction of the court or its tribunals. The act gives the President the power to use "all means necessary and appropriate to bring about the release of any U.S. or allied personnel being detained or imprisoned by, on behalf of, or at the request of the International Criminal Court". During the administration of Barack Obama, U.S. opposition to the ICC evolved to "positive engagement", but no effort was made to ratify the Rome Statute.

The subsequent Donald Trump administration was considerably more hostile to the Court, similar to the Bush administration, threatening prosecution and financial sanctions on ICC judges and staff in U.S. courts as well as imposing visa bans in response to any investigation against American nationals in connection to alleged crimes and atrocities perpetrated by the U.S. in Afghanistan. The threat included sanctions against any of over 120 countries that have ratified the Court for cooperating in the process. In November 2017, Fatou Bensouda advised the court to consider seeking charges for human rights abuses committed during the War in Afghanistan, such as alleged rapes and tortures by the U.S. Armed Forces and the Central Intelligence Agency, crimes against humanity committed by the Taliban, and war crimes committed by the Afghan National Security Forces. John Bolton, National Security Advisor of the United States, stated that the ICC had no jurisdiction over the U.S., which had not ratified the Rome Statute. In 2020, overturning the previous decision not to proceed, senior judges at the ICC authorised an investigation into the alleged war crimes in Afghanistan.

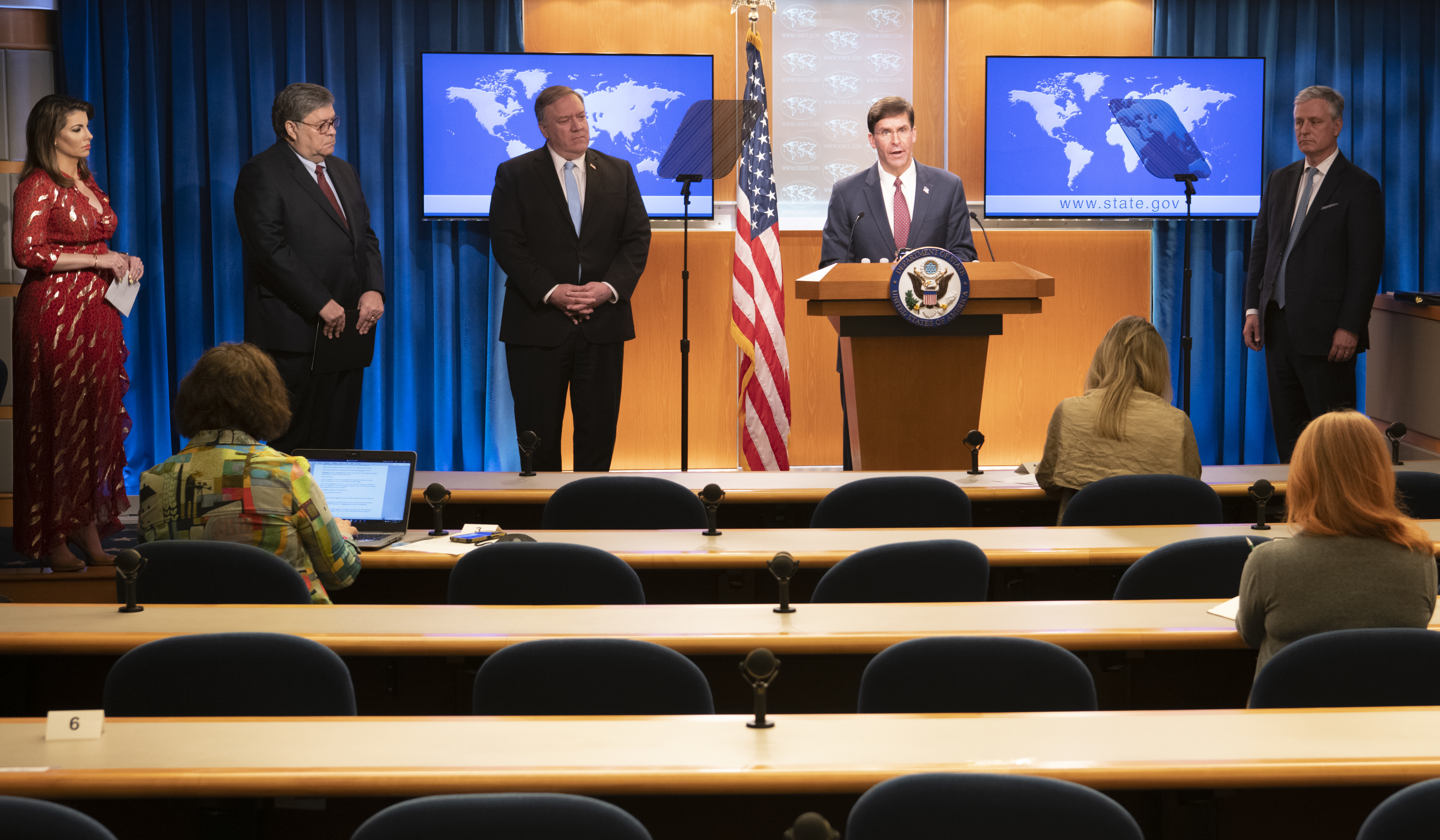
Attorney General William Barr speaks at news conference on the International Criminal Court, 11 June 2020. (from right to left) Secretary Mark Esper, William Barr, Secretary Mike Pompeo, and National Security Advisor O'Brien

On 11 June 2020, Trump signed Executive Order 13928, imposing sanctions on ICC officials and employees, as well as their families, involved in investigating alleged crimes against humanity committed by U.S. armed forces in Afghanistan. This move was widely criticised by human rights groups. The U.S. ordered sanctions against the ICC prosecutor Fatou Bensouda and the ICC's head of Jurisdiction, Complementary, and Cooperation Division, Phakiso Mochochok, for an investigation into alleged war crimes by U.S. forces and the Central Intelligence Agency (CIA) in Afghanistan since 2003. Attorney General William Barr said, "The U.S. government has reason to doubt the honesty of the ICC. The Department of Justice has received substantial credible information that raises serious concerns about a long history of financial corruption and malfeasance at the highest levels of the office of the prosecutor.". The ICC responded with a statement expressing "profound regret at the announcement of further threats and coercive actions." "These attacks constitute an escalation and an unacceptable attempt to interfere with the rule of law and the Court's judicial proceedings", the statement said. "They are announced with the declared aim of influencing the actions of ICC officials in the context of the court's independent and objective investigations and impartial judicial proceedings."

On 30 September 2020, prominent United States human rights lawyers announced that they would sue Trump and his Administration—including Barr, Secretary of State Mike Pompeo, Treasury Secretary Steven Mnuchin, and OFAC director Andrea Gacki, and the departments they head—on the grounds that Trump's Executive Order 13928 order had gagged them, violating their right to free speech and impeding their work in trying to obtain justice on behalf of victims of war crimes. One of the plaintiffs, Diane Marie Amann, stated that, as a result of sanctions against the chief prosecutor at the ICC, she herself risked having her family assets seized if she continued to work for children who are bought and sold by traffickers, killed, tortured, sexually abused and forced to become child soldiers.

On 4 January 2021, U.S. District Judge Katherine Polk Failla in New York City issued a preliminary injunction against the Trump administration from imposing criminal or civil penalties against ICC personnel and those who support the court's work, including the plaintiffs. The sanctions were subsequently lifted by the Biden administration Secretary of State Antony Blinken in April 2021.

In 2023, the Biden administration welcomed the issuing of an ICC arrest warrant for Russian President Vladimir Putin. President Joe Biden said that the issuing of the warrant "makes a very strong point". In 2024, the Biden administration opposed an arrest warrant for Israeli Prime Minister Benjamin Netanyahu over Israeli war crimes committed during the Gaza genocide. Biden denounced Netanyahu's arrest warrant as "outrageous". Secretary of State Antony Blinken said the Biden administration would work with the U.S. Congress on potential sanctions against the ICC. Prior to the issuing of the ICC's arrest warrant for Netanyahu, a group of U.S. Republican senators sent a letter to ICC prosecutor Karim Ahmad Khan that contained the warning "Target Israel and we will target you. If you move forward ... we will move to end all American support for the ICC, sanction your employees and associates, and bar you and your families from the United States. You have been warned." The U.S. House of Representatives passed a bill to sanction ICC officials on 4 June 2024.

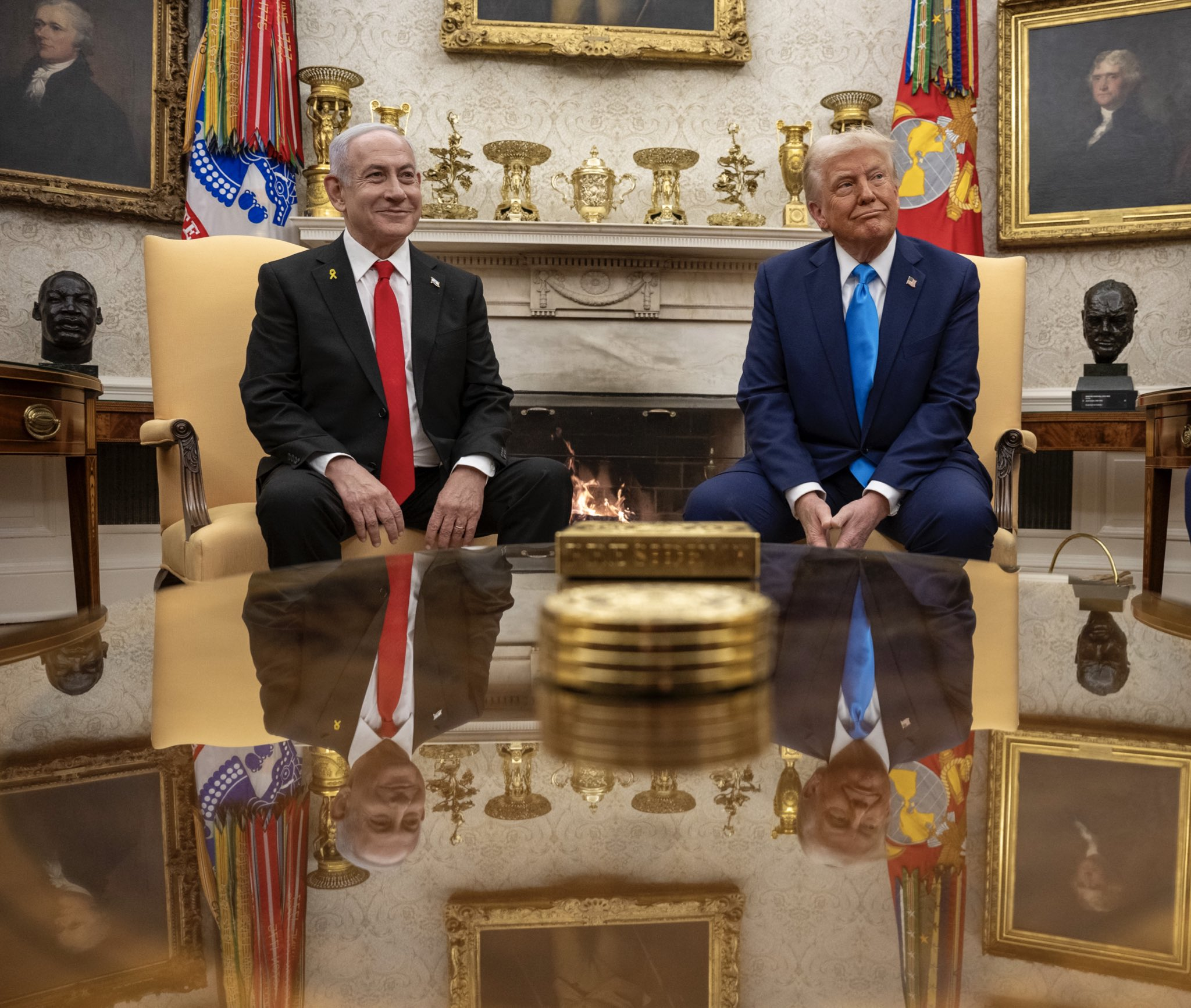
U.S. President Donald Trump and Israeli Prime Minister Netanyahu at the White House, 4 February 2025

On 9 January 2025, the U.S. House of Representatives passed the Illegitimate Court Counteraction Act by 243–140 to sanction the ICC in protest at its arrest warrants for Netanyahu and Gallant issued in November 2024. On 6 February 2025, U.S. President Donald Trump signed an executive order imposing economic and travel sanctions on individuals involved in ICC investigations targeting U.S. citizens and allies, notably Israel. This action coincided with Netanyahu visiting Washington. The sanctions entail freezing U.S. assets of designated individuals and prohibiting their entry into the United States. This move mirrors a similar stance taken during Trump's first term, when sanctions were applied to ICC officials over investigations into alleged war crimes by U.S. forces in Afghanistan.

On 5 June 2025, the United States Department of State sanctioned four ICC judges—Solome Bossa of Uganda, Luz del Carmen Ibáñez Carranza of Peru, Reine Alapini-Gansou of Benin, and Beti Hohler of Slovenia—under President Trump's Executive Order 14203, "Imposing Sanctions on the International Criminal Court." The four judges were accused of engaging in efforts "to investigate, arrest, detain, or prosecute a protected person without consent of that person's country of nationality"— viz, of the United States or Israel. The sanctions effectively block those individuals' property interests and all other beneficial financial transactions within the United States.

On 11 December 2025 it was reported that the U.S. was threatening the ICC with further sanctions unless it modifies its foundational charter to guarantee that it will not prosecute Trump and his senior officials, as well as to end its investigations into Israeli leaders regarding the genocide in Gaza and the conduct of American forces in Afghanistan.

On 13 July 2026, U.S. Secretary of State Marco Rubio published an op-ed in The Wall Street Journal announcing that the United States government would seek to "dismantle the ICC—brick by brick, if necessary." Subsequently, Venezuela and Chad notified the UN of their intention to withdraw. These decisions were welcomed by the United States.

On 18 August 2026, the United States imposed sanctions on ICC President Tomoko Akane of Japan and ICC Senior Trial Lawyer Abdoulaye Seye of Senegal, pursuant to the same Executive Order 14203.

On 9 October 2026, the United States imposed new sanctions on the ICC. The sanctions bar the ICC from U.S. financial services, technology companies and transactions in U.S. dollars, and require U.S. businesses and individuals to wind down their businesses with the ICC in six months. Canada, Denmark, Germany, France, Italy, Japan, the Netherlands and the United Kingdom jointly opposed the sanctions.

==== U.S. criticism ====
The United States Department of State argues that there are "insufficient checks and balances on the authority of the ICC prosecutor and judges" and "insufficient protection against politicized prosecutions or other abuses". The current law in the United States on the ICC is the American Service-Members' Protection Act (ASPA), 116 Stat. 820. The ASPA authorises the President of the United States to use "all means necessary and appropriate to bring about the release of any U.S. or allied personnel being detained or imprisoned by, on behalf of, or at the request of the International Criminal Court". This authorisation has led the act to be nicknamed the "Hague Invasion Act", because the freeing of U.S. citizens by force might be possible only through military action. Luis Moreno-Ocampo, chief ICC prosecutor, stressed in 2011 the importance of politics in prosecutions: "You cannot say al-Bashir is in London, arrest him. You need a political agreement." Henry Kissinger has stated that the checks and balances are so weak that the prosecutor "has virtually unlimited discretion in practice".

On 10 September 2018, John R. Bolton, in his first major address as U.S. National Security Advisor, reiterated that the ICC lacks checks and balances, exercises "jurisdiction over crimes that have disputed and ambiguous definitions", and has failed to "deter and punish atrocity crimes". The ICC, Bolton said, was "superfluous", given that "domestic judicial systems already hold American citizens to the highest legal and ethical standards". He added that the U.S. would do everything "to protect our citizens" should the ICC attempt to prosecute U.S. servicemen over detainee torture and abuse in Afghanistan. In that event, ICC judges and prosecutors would be barred from entering the U.S., their funds in the U.S. would be sanctioned and the U.S. "will prosecute them in the U.S. criminal system. We will do the same for any company or state that assists an ICC investigation of Americans", Bolton said. He also criticised Palestinian efforts to bring Israel before the ICC over human rights abuses in the West Bank and Gaza.

=== United Kingdom ===
Media revealed that the British government secretly threatened to withdraw funding from the ICC and withdraw from it if it issued arrest warrants for Israeli leaders. David Cameron, Minister of Foreign Affairs in Rishi Sunak's government, made this threat in April 2024 during a phone call with Karim Khan, the British prosecutor at the court. The subsequent Labour governments, however, have not followed up on this initiative.

== Awards ==
In October 2026, the ICC and its officials were awarded the European Union's Sakharov Prize in recognition of "the important work of the court in upholding international law and justice". The award came amid increased U.S. sanctions on the Court, which in turn came days after former ICC judge Navi Pillay won the 2026 Nobel Peace Prize. In a statement, ICC president Tomoko Akane said the prize reaffirmed "the importance of independent judicial institutions and of those who work to uphold international law". Euronews described the award as "signalling opposition to U.S. sanctions threatening the court’s work", on the part of European Parliament.

== See also ==
- Agreement on the Privileges and Immunities of the International Criminal Court
- Legal Tools (database on International Criminal Law)
