= 2015 International Criminal Court judges election =

- 24 June 2015

1 of 18 seats on the International Criminal Court
- Outgoing judge (Philippines) Miriam Defensor Santiago Elected judge (Philippines) Raul Cano Pangalangan

A special election for one judge of the International Criminal Court was held during the resumption of the 13th session of the Assembly of States Parties to the Rome Statute of the International Criminal Court which took place in The Hague from 24 to 25 June 2015.

The election became necessary after one judge elected in the 2011 election was unavailable: Miriam Defensor-Santiago had resigned from the bench on 3 June 2014.

== Background ==
The judge elected at this election was chosen to complete the term, until 10 March 2021, of the judge he replaced.

The election was governed by the Rome Statute of the International Criminal Court. Its article 36(8)(a) states that "[t]he States Parties shall, in the selection of judges, take into account the need, within the membership of the Court, for:

- (i) The representation of the principal legal systems of the world;
- (ii) Equitable geographical representation; and
- (iii) A fair representation of female and male judges."

Furthermore, article 36(3)(b) and 36(5) provide for two lists:

- List A contains those judges that "[h]ave established competence in criminal law and procedure, and the necessary relevant experience, whether as judge, prosecutor, advocate or in other similar capacity, in criminal proceedings";
- List B contains those who "[h]ave established competence in relevant areas of international law such as international humanitarian law and the law of human rights, and extensive experience in a professional legal capacity which is of relevance to the judicial work of the Court".

Each candidate has to belong to exactly one list. A minimum of nine judges elected from list A and five judges elected from list B is to be maintained on the court.

Further rules of election were adopted by a resolution of the Assembly of States Parties in 2004.

== Judges remaining in office ==
The following judges remained in office:

Judge	Nationality	List A or B		Regional criteria					Gender	
Judge	Nationality	List A	List B	African	Asian	E. European	GRULAG	WEOG	Female	Male
Joyce Aluoch	Kenya	X		X					X	
Chung Chang-ho	South Korea	X			X					X
Chile Eboe-Osuji	Nigeria	X		X						X
Silvia Fernández de Gurmendi	Argentina	X					X		X	
Robert Fremr	Czech Republic	X				X				X
Geoffrey A. Henderson	Trinidad and Tobago	X					X			X
Olga Venecia Herrera Carbuccia	Dominican Republic	X					X		X	
Piotr Hofmański	Poland	X				X				X
Péter Kovács	Hungary		X			X				X
Antoine Mindua	Democratic Republic of the Congo		X	X						X
Sanji Mmasenono Monageng	Botswana		X	X					X	
Howard Morrison	United Kingdom	X						X		X
Kuniko Ozaki	Japan		X		X				X	
Marc Pierre Perrin de Brichambaut	France		X					X		X
Bertram Schmitt	Germany	X						X		X
Cuno Tarfusser	Italy	X						X		X
Christine van den Wyngaert	Belgium	X						X	X	
		12	5	4	2	3	3	5	6	11

== Nomination process ==
The nomination period of judges for the 2015 special election lasted from 18 February to 31 March 2015 and could have been extended up to three times if there had been a lack of candidates from a group for which a minimum voting requirement was in place. The following persons were nominated:

Name	Nationality	List A or B	Region	Gender
Ibrahim Aljazy	Jordan	List B	Asia-Pacific States	Male
Raul Cano Pangalangan	Philippines	List B	Asia-Pacific States	Male

The nomination dated 31 March 2015 of A.B.M. Khairul Haque of Bangladesh was withdrawn on 13 April 2015.

== Minimum voting requirements ==
Minimum voting requirements governed part of the election. This was to ensure that articles 36(5) and 36(8)(a) cited above were fulfilled. For this election, the following minimum voting requirements existed; they could have been adjusted once the election was underway.

Regarding the List A or B requirement, there was no minimum voting requirement.

Regarding the regional criteria, there was a voting requirement for one judge from the Asia-Pacific States.

Regarding the gender criteria, there was no minimum voting requirement.

The regional criterion could have been adjusted even before the election depending on the number of candidates. Paragraph 20(b) of the ASP resolution that governs the elections states that if there are less than double the number of candidates required for each region, the minimum voting requirement shall be a (rounded-up) half of the number of candidates; except when there is only one candidate which results in no voting requirement.

The regional criterion would have been dropped if the seat had not been filled after four ballots.

The voting requirements were as follows:

Criterion	Number of judges required	Number of judges remaining in office	Ex ante voting requirement	Number of candidates	Adjusted voting requirement	Adjusted requirement equals ex ante?
Lists A or B
List A	9	12	0	0	0	Yes
List B	5	5	0	2	0	Yes
Regional criteria
African states	3	4	0	0	0	Yes
Asia-Pacific states	3	2	1	2	1	Yes
Eastern European states	3	3	0	0	0	Yes
Latin American and Caribbean States	3	3	0	0	0	Yes
Western European and other States	3	5	0	0	0	Yes
Gender criteria
Female	6	6	0	0	0	Yes
Male	6	11	0	2	0	Yes

== Ballots ==
On 24 June 2015, Raul Cano Pangalangan of the Philippines was elected.

The ballot took place on 24 June 2015. The voting totals were as follows:

Name	Nationality	List A or B	Region	Gender	1st round	2nd round
Number of States Parties voting					83	84
Two-thirds majority					56	56
Raul Cano Pangalangan	Philippines	List B	Asia-Pacific States	Male	53	59
Ibrahim Aljazy	Jordan	List B	Asia-Pacific States	Male	30	25

As only one seat was being filled and the minimum voting requirement compelled each valid ballot to include one candidate from the Asia-Pacific States, the elected judge necessarily satisfied the corresponding regional criterion. Candidates from other regional groups could not have received votes in the first four ballots; none had been nominated.
