= 2017 International Criminal Court judges election =

- 4–6 December 2017

6 of 18 seats on the International Criminal Court
- Outgoing judges (Japan) Kuniko Ozaki (Argentina) Silvia Fernández de Gurmendi (Botswana) Sanji Mmasenono Monageng (Kenya) Joyce Aluoch (Belgium) Christine van den Wyngaert (Italy) Cuno Tarfusser Elected judges (Japan) Tomoko Akane (Peru) Luz del Carmen Ibáñez Carranza (Benin) Reine Alapini-Gansou (Uganda) Solomy Balungi Bossa (Canada) Kimberly Prost (Italy) Rosario Salvatore Aitala

Six judges of the International Criminal Court were elected during the 16th session of the Assembly of States Parties to the Rome Statute of the International Criminal Court held from 4 to 14 December 2017 in New York. The judges were elected for terms of nine years and took office on 11 March 2018.

== Background ==
The judges elected at this session replaced six judges elected in 2009 for terms lasting until 2018; they will also serve for nine years until 2027.

The election was governed by the Rome Statute of the International Criminal Court. Its article 36(8)(a) states that "[t]he States Parties shall, in the selection of judges, take into account the need, within the membership of the Court, for:

- (i) The representation of the principal legal systems of the world;
- (ii) Equitable geographical representation; and
- (iii) A fair representation of female and male judges."

Furthermore, article 36(3)(b) and 36(5) provide for two lists:

- List A contains those judges that "[h]ave established competence in criminal law and procedure, and the necessary relevant experience, whether as judge, prosecutor, advocate or in other similar capacity, in criminal proceedings";
- List B contains those who "[h]ave established competence in relevant areas of international law such as international humanitarian law and the law of human rights, and extensive experience in a professional legal capacity which is of relevance to the judicial work of the Court".

Each candidate has to belong to exactly one list. A minimum of nine judges elected from list A and five judges elected from list B is to be maintained on the court.

Further rules of election were adopted by a resolution of the Assembly of States Parties in 2004.

== Judges remaining in office ==
The following judges were scheduled to remain in office beyond 2018:

| Judge | Nationality | List A or B | | Regional criteria | | | | | Gender | |
| Judge | Nationality | List A | List B | African | Asian | E. European | GRULAG | WEOG | Female | Male |
| Chile Eboe-Osuji | Nigeria | X | | X | | | | | | X |
| Antoine Kesia-Mbe Mindua | Democratic Republic of the Congo | | X | X | | | | | | X |
| Chung Chang-ho | South Korea | X | | | X | | | | | X |
| Raul Cano Pangalangan | Philippines | | X | | X | | | | | X |
| Robert Fremr | Czech Republic | X | | | | X | | | | X |
| Piotr Hofmański | Poland | X | | | | X | | | | X |
| Péter Kovács | Hungary | | X | | | X | | | | X |
| Geoffrey A. Henderson | Trinidad and Tobago | X | | | | | X | | | X |
| Olga Venecia Herrera Carbuccia | Dominican Republic | X | | | | | X | | X | |
| Howard Morrison | United Kingdom | X | | | | | | X | | X |
| Marc Perrin de Brichambaut | France | | X | | | | | X | | X |
| Bertram Schmitt | Germany | X | | | | | | X | | X |
| | | 8 | 4 | 2 | 2 | 3 | 2 | 3 | 1 | 11 |

== Nomination process ==
The nomination period of judges for the 2017 election lasted from 24 April to 16 July 2017. It was extended three times (the maximal number of extensions), to 30 July, to 13 August and finally to 27 August, because the required number of ten female candidates had not been nominated. The final extension also did not result in this requirement being fulfilled. The following persons were nominated:

| Candidate | Nationality | List A or B | | Regional criteria | | | | | Gender | |
| Candidate | Nationality | List A | List B | African | Asian | E. European | GRULAG | WEOG | Female | Male |
| Rosario Salvatore Aitala | Italy | X | | | | | | X | | X |
| Tomoko Akane | Japan | X | | | X | | | | X | |
| Reine Alapini-Gansou | Benin | | X | X | | | | | X | |
| Solomy Balungi Bossa | Uganda | X | | X | | | | | X | |
| Zlata Đurđević | Croatia | | X | | | X | | | X | |
| Luz del Carmen Ibáñez Carranza | Peru | X | | | | | X | | X | |
| Khosbayar Chagdaa | Mongolia | X | | | X | | | | | X |
| Nthomeng Justina Majara | Lesotho | X | | X | | | | | X | |
| Henrietta Mensa-Bonsu | Ghana | X | | X | | | | | X | |
| Ariela Peralta Distéfano | Uruguay | | X | | | | X | | X | |
| Kimberly Prost | Canada | X | | | | | | X | X | |
| Dragomir Vukoje | Bosnia and Herzegovina | X | | | | X | | | | X |
| | | 9 | 3 | 4 | 2 | 2 | 2 | 2 | 9 | 3 |

== Minimum voting requirements ==
Minimum voting requirements governed part of the election. This was to ensure that articles 36(5) and 36(8)(a) cited above were fulfilled. For this election, the following minimum voting requirements applied initially:

| Criterion | Number of judges required | Number of judges remaining in office | Ex ante voting requirement | Number of candidates | Adjusted voting requirement | Adjusted voting requirement equals ex ante? |
Lists A or B
| List A | 9 | 8 | 1 | 9 | 1 | Yes |
| List B | 5 | 4 | 1 | 3 | 1 | Yes |
Regional criteria
| African | 3 | 2 | 1 | 4 | 1 | Yes |
| Asian | 3 | 2 | 1 | 2 | 1 | Yes |
| Eastern European | 3 | 3 | 0 | 2 | 0 | Yes |
| Latin American and Caribbean | 3 | 2 | 1 | 2 | 1 | Yes |
| Western European and other | 3 | 3 | 0 | 2 | 0 | Yes |
Gender criteria
| Female | 6 | 1 | 5 | 9 | 5 | Yes |
| Male | 6 | 11 | 0 | 3 | 0 | Yes |

Regarding the List A or B requirement, one vote had to be cast for a List A candidate and one for a List B candidate.

Regarding the regional criteria, three votes had to be cast for certain regional groups: one for an African candidate, one for an Asian candidate and one for a Latin American or Caribbean candidate.

Regarding the gender criteria, five votes had to be cast for female candidates.

The regional and gender requirements could have been adjusted before the election depending on the number of candidates, pursuant to paragraphs 20 (b) and (c) of the resolution that governs the elections.

The minimum voting requirements are updated after each ballot to account for the judges already elected. The regional and gender requirements are dropped either if they can no longer be (jointly) fulfilled, or if after four ballots not all seats are filled. The List A or B requirement remains active until a sufficient number of judges has been elected from each list.

== Ballots ==
The ballot results were as follows:

| Candidate | Nationality | 4 December 2017 | | 5 December 2017 | | | | | 6 December 2017 | |
| Candidate | Nationality | 1st ballot | 2nd ballot | 3rd ballot | 4th ballot | 5th ballot | 6th ballot | 7th ballot | 8th ballot | 9th ballot |
| Valid votes cast | | 109 | 118 | 119 | 120 | 122 | 122 | 122 | 123 | 123 |
| Two-thirds majority | | 73 | 79 | 80 | 80 | 82 | 82 | 82 | 82 | 82 |
| Tomoko Akane | Japan | 88 | elected | | | | | | | |
| Luz del Carmen Ibáñez Carranza | Peru | 77 | elected | | | | | | | |
| Reine Alapini-Gansou | Benin | 66 | 70 | 77 | 83 | elected | | | | |
| Solomy Balungi Bossa | Uganda | 67 | 71 | 78 | 81 | elected | | | | |
| Kimberly Prost | Canada | 66 | 67 | 72 | 74 | 76 | 92 | elected | | |
| Rosario Salvatore Aitala | Italy | 55 | 53 | 57 | 56 | 45 | 63 | 77 | 77 | 84 |
| Henrietta Mensa-Bonsu | Ghana | 49 | 52 | 57 | 60 | 42 | 45 | 45 | 46 | 39 |
| Zlata Đurđević | Croatia | 59 | 51 | 51 | 49 | 37 | 36 | withdrawn | | |
| Nthomeng Justina Majara | Lesotho | 37 | 35 | 33 | 30 | 22 | withdrawn | | | |
| Ariela Peralta Distefano | Uruguay | 61 | 52 | 40 | 39 | 17 | withdrawn | | | |
| Khosbayar Chagdaa | Mongolia | 24 | 15 | 7 | withdrawn | | | | | |
| Dragomir Vukoje | Bosnia and Herzegovina | 3 | 3 | withdrawn | | | | | | |

The minimum voting requirements are imposed on the ballots cast, not on the results. Thus, there is no guarantee that a corresponding number of judges is elected. However, in this election this was the case:

| Criterion | Initial minimal voting requirement | Corresponding number of judges elected? |
| List A | 1 | Yes, after 1st ballot |
| List B | 1 | Yes, after 4th ballot |
| African | 1 | Yes, after 4th ballot |
| Asian | 1 | Yes, after 1st ballot |
| Latin American and Caribbean | 1 | Yes, after 1st ballot |
| Female | 5 | Yes, after 6th ballot |

Note that the minimum voting requirement according to gender was dropped after the 4th ballot and was thus no longer being imposed when a fifth female judge was elected in the 6th ballot.
