= International Criminal Court investigation in Ukraine =

Situation in Ukraine
- The seal of the International Criminal Court
- File no.: 01/22
- Referred by: Albania, Australia, Austria, and 36 other ICC member states
- Date referred: 25 February 2022
- Date opened: 3 March 2022
- Incident(s): Revolution of Dignity and Russo-Ukrainian War
- Crimes: war crimes: crimes against humanity:

Status of suspects
- Vladimir Putin: Fugitive
- Maria Lvova-Belova: Fugitive
- Viktor Sokolov: Fugitive
- Sergey Kobylash: Fugitive
- Sergei Shoigu: Fugitive
- Valery Gerasimov: Fugitive

The International Criminal Court investigation in Ukraine or the Situation in Ukraine is an ongoing investigation by the prosecutor of the International Criminal Court (ICC) into "any past and present allegations of war crimes, crimes against humanity or genocide committed on any part of the territory of Ukraine by any person" during the period starting "from 21 November 2013 onwards", on an "open-ended basis", covering the Revolution of Dignity, the Russo-Ukrainian war including the 2014 annexation of Crimea by Russia, the war in Donbas and the Russian invasion of Ukraine. The ICC prosecutor commenced these investigations on 2 March 2022, after receiving referrals for the situation in Ukraine from 39 ICC State Parties. On 1 January 2025, Ukraine became the 125th member of the International Criminal Court.

== Preliminary examination ==
As of February 2022, Ukraine was not party to the Rome Statute of the International Criminal Court (ICC). In 2014 and 2015, the government of Ukraine made two formal requests for the ICC to investigate any war crimes and crimes against humanity that may have occurred in Ukraine in the 2014 Euromaidan protests and civil unrest, the 2014 annexation of Crimea by the Russian Federation, and the war in Donbas. The first declaration was for the dates from 21 November 2013 to 22 February 2014, covering the whole territory of Ukraine. The second declaration requested an extended investigation from 20 February with an open-ended date, again for the whole of Ukrainian territory.

On 25 April 2014, the ICC started a preliminary examination of crimes against humanity that may have occurred in Ukraine in the 2014 Euromaidan protests and civil unrest, the 2014 annexation of Crimea by the Russian Federation, and the war in Donbas. On 11 December 2020, the ICC Prosecutor found that "there was a reasonable basis to believe that war crimes and crimes against humanity were committed", that the "alleged crimes identified would [as of December 2020] be admissible", and that there was "a reasonable basis for investigation, subject to judicial authorisation".

== Referrals, jurisdiction and authorisation ==
On 25 February 2022, the day after the start of the Russian invasion of Ukraine, ICC Prosecutor Karim Ahmad Khan stated that the ICC could "exercise its jurisdiction and investigate any act of genocide, crime against humanity or war crime committed within Ukraine." Khan stated on 28 February that he intended to launch a full ICC investigation and that he had requested his team to "explore all evidence preservation opportunities". He stated that it would be faster to officially open the investigation if an ICC member state referred the case for investigation, under Article 13(a) of the Rome Statute, rather than under proprio motu of Article 13(c), which would also establish jurisdiction, but would be slower.

Lithuanian prime minister Ingrida Šimonytė stated on 28 February that Lithuania had requested that the ICC investigation be opened. On 2 March 2022, Khan stated that he had received referrals from 39 states, enabling Khan to open an investigation under Article 14 of the Rome Statute. Khan stated that the Prosecutor's Office had already "identified potential cases that would be admissible". On 11 March, Japan and North Macedonia joined the referrals, bringing the total number of referring states to 41. On 1 or 2 March 2022, the Situation in Ukraine was assigned to Pre-Trial Chamber II of the ICC, with judges Antoine Kesia-Mbe Mindua, Tomoko Akane and Rosario Salvatore Aitala, who are required to decide whether to authorise the investigation after they receive a request for authorisation from the Prosecutor, Khan.

=== List of countries that referred the situation in Ukraine to the ICC ===
The countries that referred the case of war crimes in Ukraine to the ICC include the following:

1. Albania
2. Australia
3. Austria
4. Belgium
5. Bulgaria
6. Canada
7. Chile
8. Colombia
9. Costa Rica
10. Croatia
11. Cyprus
12. Czech Republic
13. Denmark
14. Estonia
15. Finland
16. France
17. Georgia
18. Germany
19. Greece
20. Hungary
21. Iceland
22. Ireland
23. Italy
24. Japan
25. Latvia
26. Liechtenstein
27. Lithuania
28. Luxembourg
29. Malta
30. Montenegro
31. North Macedonia
32. Norway
33. Netherlands
34. New Zealand
35. Poland
36. Portugal
37. Romania
38. Slovakia
39. Slovenia
40. Spain
41. Sweden
42. Switzerland
43. United Kingdom

== Investigation ==
Prosecutor Khan stated on 3 March 2022 that an initial team consisting of "investigators, lawyers, and people with particular experience in operational planning" was sent to Ukraine region to begin collecting evidence. On 11 March 2022 he announced that his office had created a dedicated portal through which any person holding information relevant to the Ukraine situation can contact the ICC investigators.

On 16 March 2022, the ICC Prosecutor visited western Ukraine and Poland to personally assess the situation on the ground in Ukraine. During this visit, the ICC Prosecutor met with the Minister of Foreign Affairs and the Prosecutor-General of Ukraine, and met the president of Ukraine, Volodymyr Zelenskyy, virtually. The ICC Prosecutor joined Zelenskyy's view that every possible effort should be made to ensure that the conduct of hostilities does not give rise to breaches of international humanitarian law, and declared that his office may investigate and prosecute any attacks intentionally directed against the civilian population or civilian objects.

== Arrest warrants ==
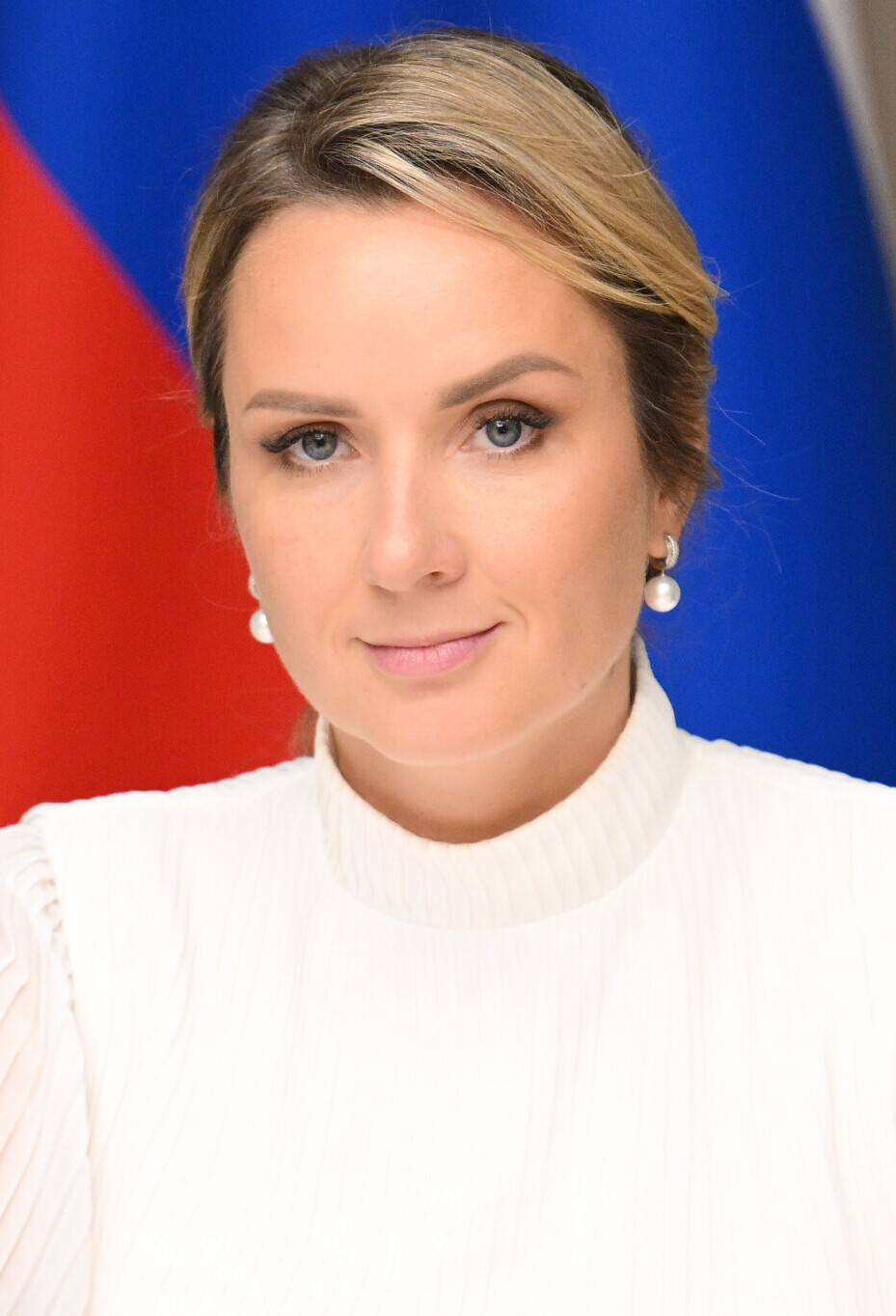
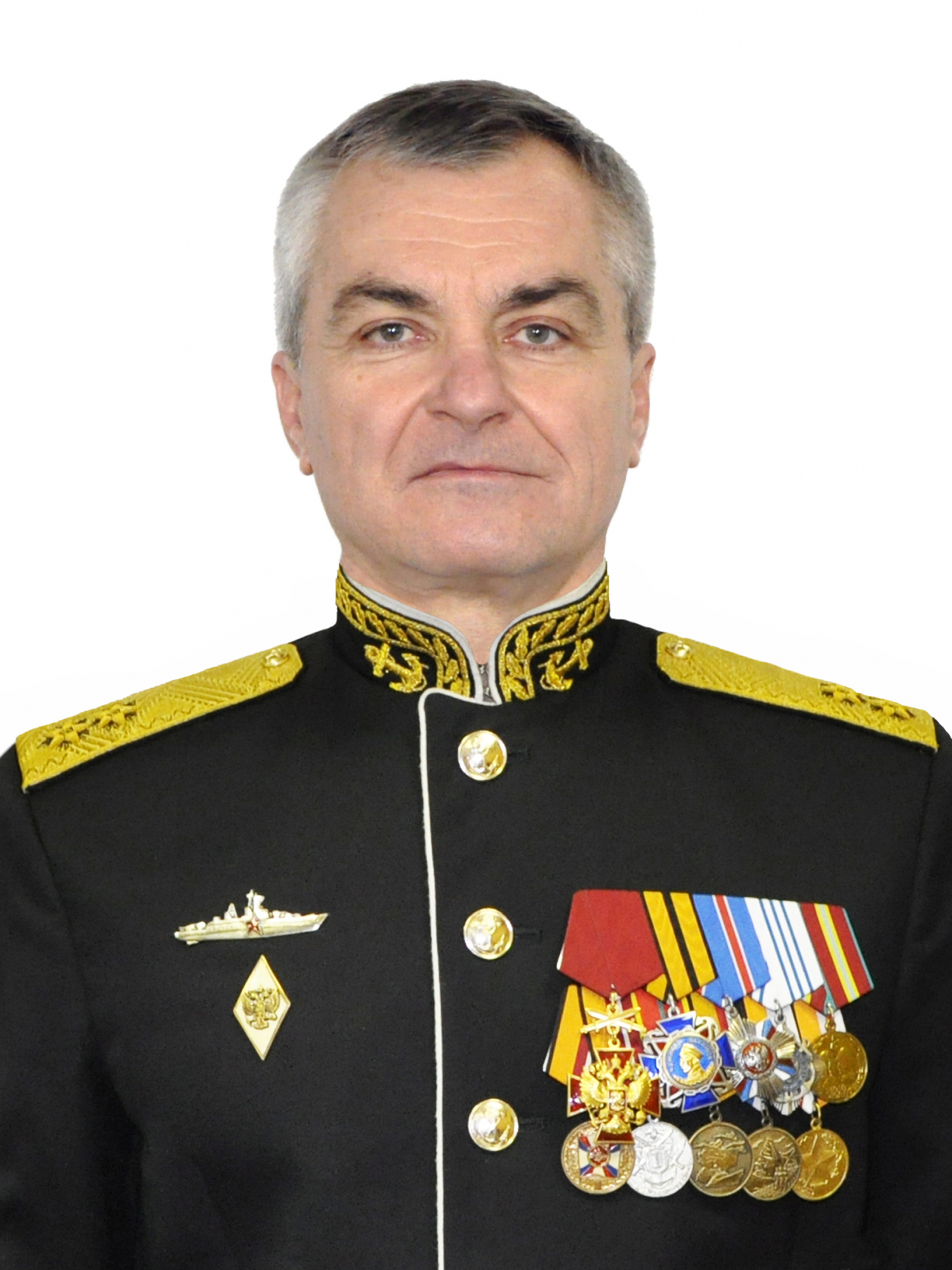
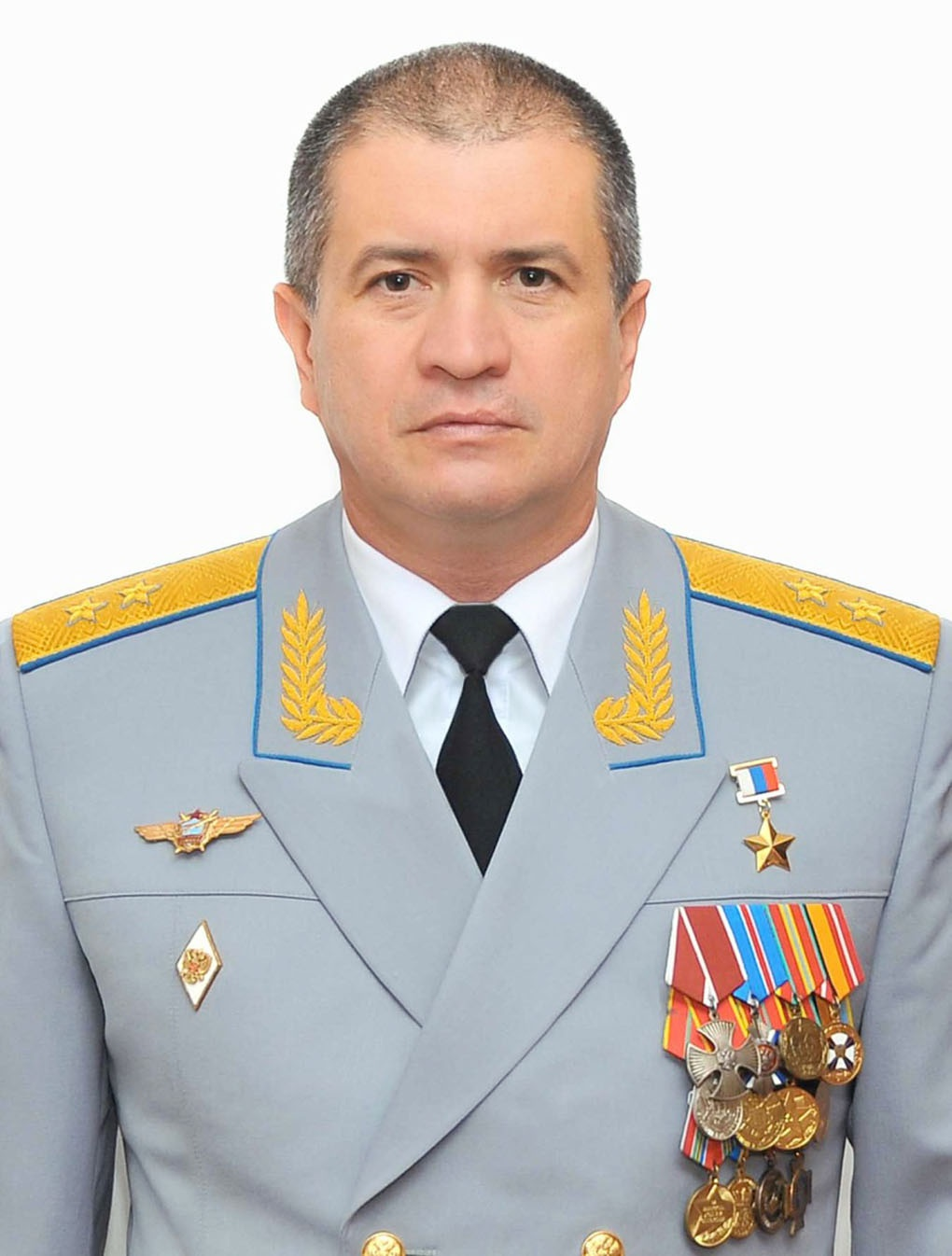
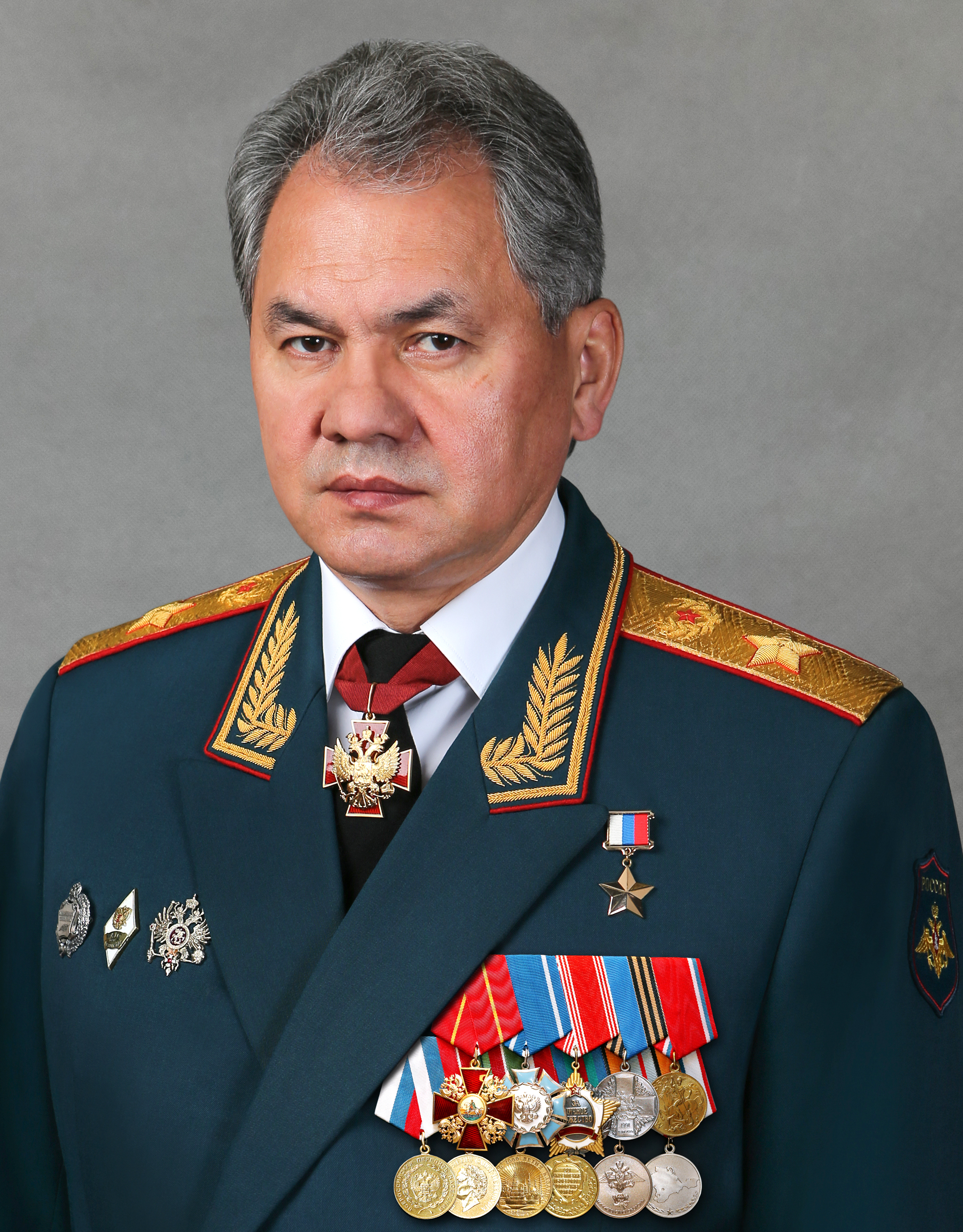
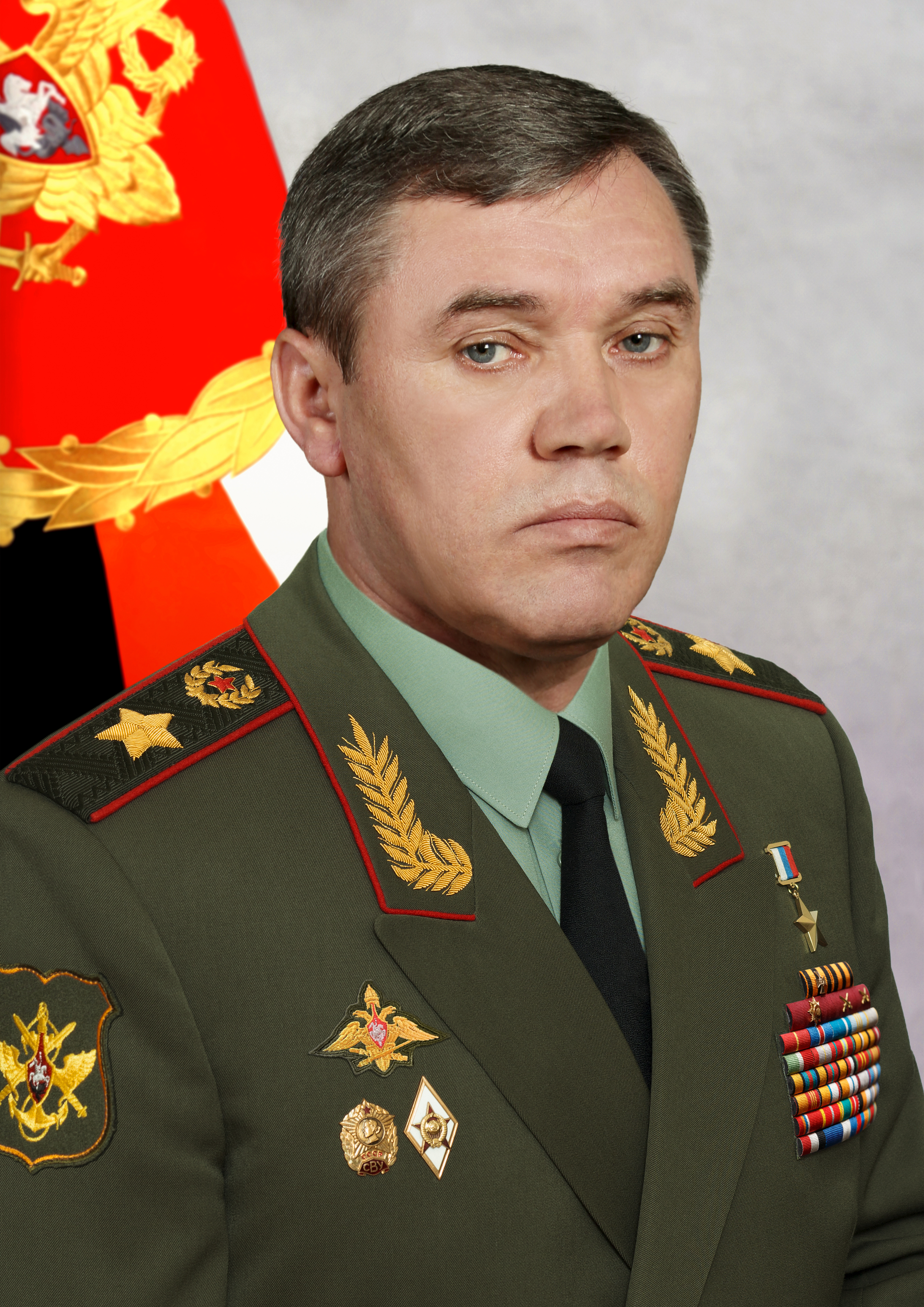
People indicted in the International Criminal Court investigation in Ukraine
- top row: Vladimir Putin, Maria Lvova-Belova
- middle row: Viktor Sokolov, Sergey Kobylash
- bottom row: Sergei Shoigu, Valery Gerasimov

On 22 February 2023, Karim Ahmad Khan requested Pre-Trial Chamber II to issue warrants for the arrest of Vladimir Putin, president of the Russian Federation, and Maria Lvova-Belova, the Presidential Commissioner for Children's Rights in Russia, on the basis of "reasonable grounds" that they "bear criminal responsibility for the unlawful deportation and transfer of Ukrainian children from occupied areas of Ukraine to the Russian Federation, contrary to article 8(2)(a)(vii) and article 8(2)(b)(viii) of the Rome Statute". Khan stated that "at least hundreds of children" had been deported to Russia, and that Putin had issued presidential decrees making it easier to give the children Russian citizenship. Khan's office interpreted the events as "an intention to permanently remove [the] children from their own country".

On 17 March 2023, the Pre-Trial Chamber issued arrest warrants for Putin and Lvova-Belova.

On 5 March 2024, the ICC issued arrest warrants for senior military officials Viktor Sokolov and Sergey Kobylash, on reasonable grounds of suspecting them of the war crimes of directing attacks at civilian objects and of causing excessive incidental harm to civilians or damage to civilian objects (Articles 8(2)(b)(ii) and 8(2)(b)(iv) of the Rome Statute) and of the crime against humanity of inhumane acts under article 7(1)(k). As of March 2024, the details of the warrants were kept secret to protect witnesses and protect the investigation.

On 24 June 2024, the ICC issued arrest warrants for Russian politician and military officer Sergei Shoigu and Russian army general Valery Gerasimov. The 125 member states of the ICC are obliged to detain and transfer any of the indicted individuals who enter the member states' territories.

== Resources ==
On 4 March 2022, European Union (EU) justice ministers requested Eurojust to support war crimes and crimes against humanity investigations by national courts and by the ICC. On 23 March 2022, the French Ministry for Europe and Foreign Affairs declared that it would provide €500 thousand of extra funding to the ICC and would increase the support "if need be".

== Issues with enforcement ==
The ICC relies on member countries to assist with investigation and enforcement. However, many countries are not members of the ICC, including India, China and the United States. Russia withdrew its signature from the Rome Statute in 2016, after the ICC ruled that Russia's invasion of Crimea amounted to an "ongoing occupation". Therefore, Russia has no legal obligation to cooperate with the ICC and would be unlikely to hand over suspects for trial or prosecution, particularly President Vladimir Putin.

Since Russia is not a member of the ICC, enforcing arrest warrants against suspects located on Russian territory is expected to be difficult.

Earlier, in April 2022, United States authorities had stated that the US would help the International Criminal Court to prosecute Russian President Vladimir Putin and others for war crimes committed during the invasion of Ukraine.

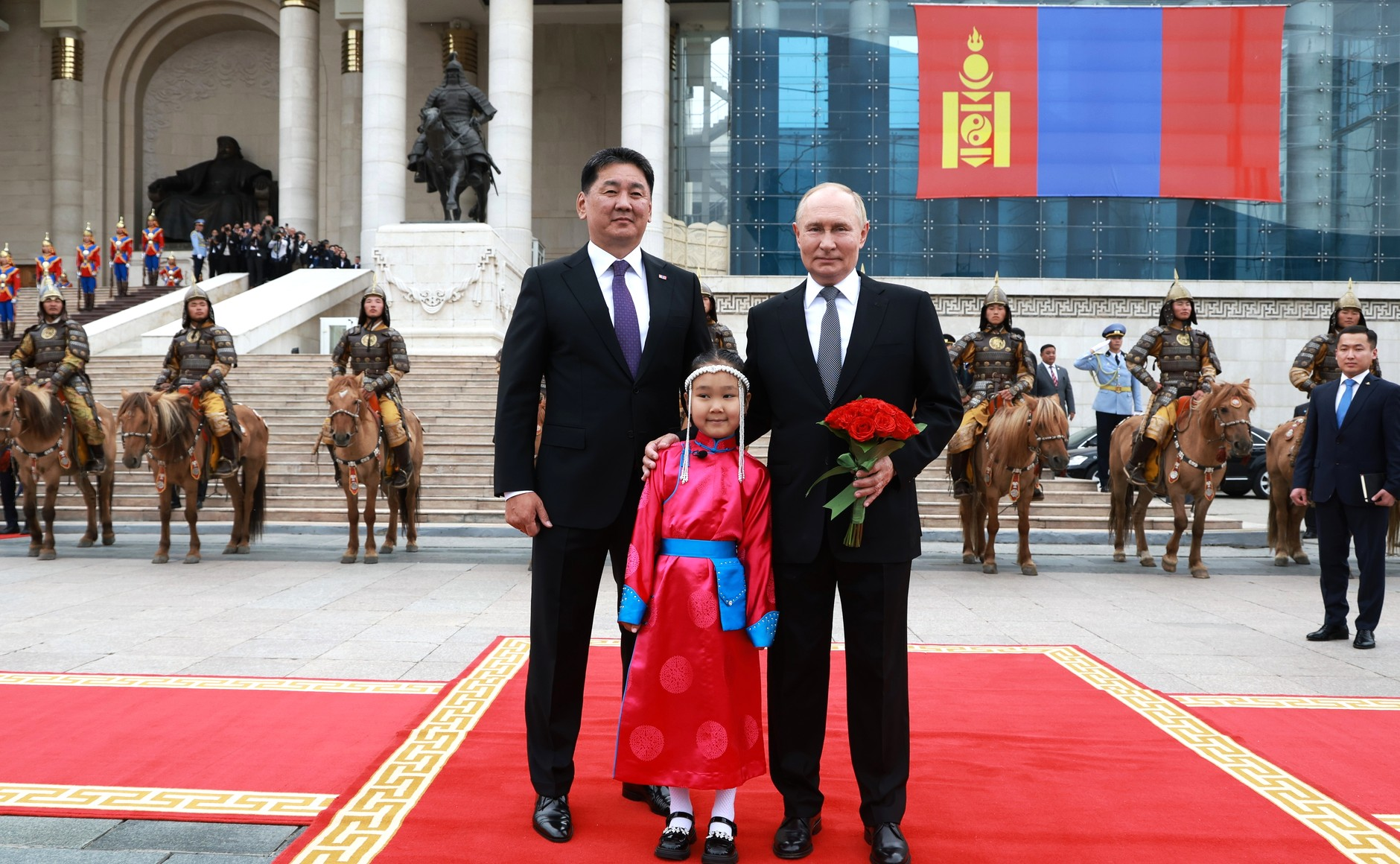
Putin and Mongolian President Ukhnaagiin Khürelsükh in Ulaanbaatar, Mongolia, 3 September 2024

On 19 March 2023, German Federal Justice Minister Marco Buschmann confirmed in an interview that Germany would arrest Putin should he set foot on German soil.

US Secretary of Defense Lloyd Austin refused to cooperate with the ICC in the investigation of Russian war crimes in Ukraine, out of concern that doing so could legitimize the ICC's investigation of United States war crimes.

On 30 August 2024, Ukraine requested Mongolian authorities to arrest Putin if he visited the country. However, Putin visited Mongolia in September 2024, and was not arrested.

== See also ==
- OSCE Special Monitoring Mission to Ukraine
- International Commission of Inquiry on Ukraine
- Legality of the Russian invasion of Ukraine
- Ukraine v. Russian Federation (2022)
- War crimes in the Russian invasion of Ukraine
