= Judges of the International Criminal Court =

The eighteen judges of the International Criminal Court (ICC) are elected for nine-year terms by the member-countries of the court. Candidates must be nationals of those countries and they must "possess the qualifications required in their respective States for appointment to the highest judicial offices".

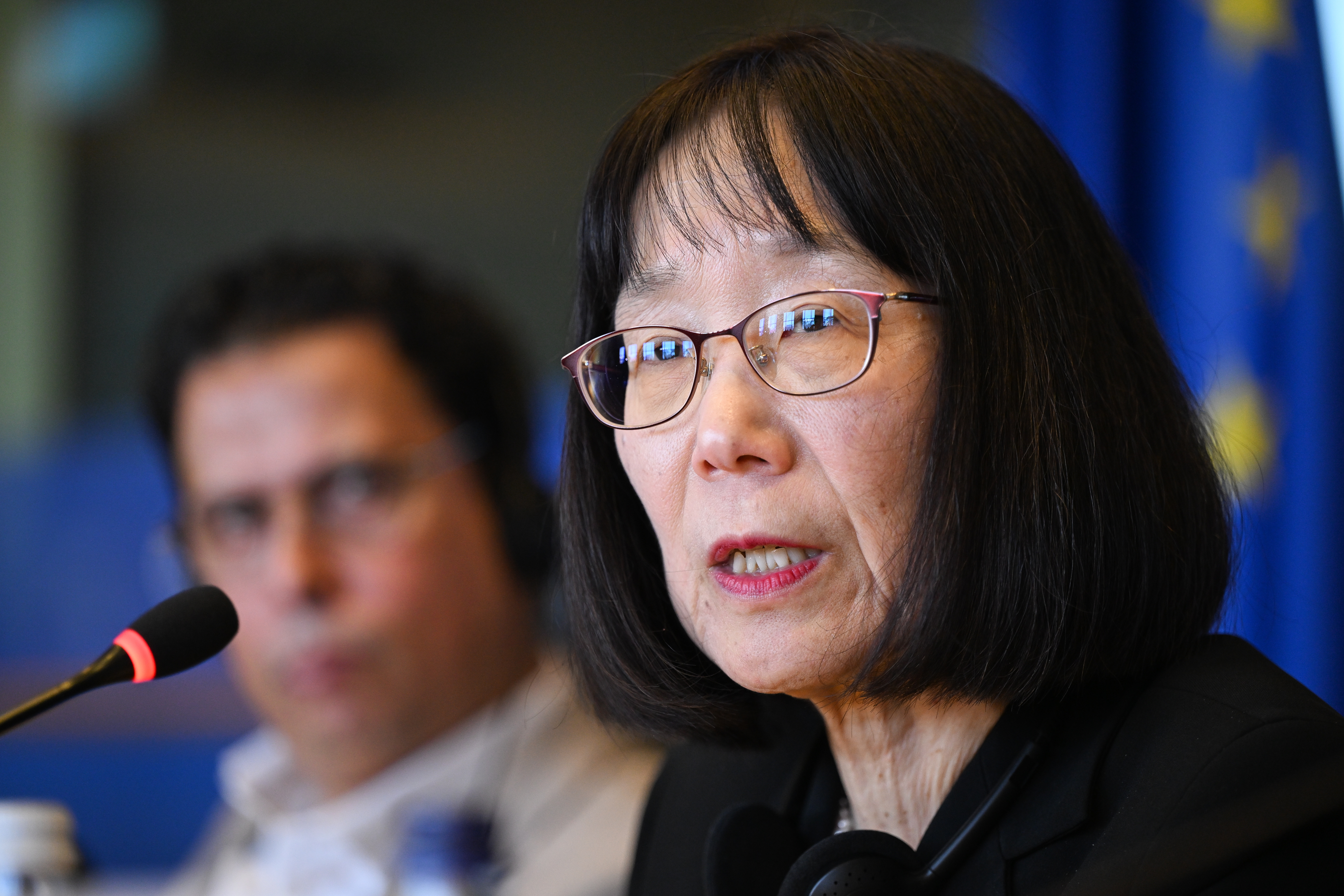
Judge Tomoko Akane, President of the ICC since 2024

A judge may be disqualified from "any case in which his or her impartiality might reasonably be doubted on any ground", and a judge may be removed from office if found "to have committed serious misconduct or a serious breach of his or her duties" or is unable to exercise his or her functions.

The judges are organized into three divisions: the Pre-Trial Division, Trial Division, and Appeals Division.

== Qualifications, election and terms ==
Judges are elected to the ICC by the Assembly of States Parties, the court's governing body. They serve nine-year terms and are not generally eligible for re-election.

By the time of their election, all judges must be nationals of states parties to the Rome Statute, and no two judges may be nationals of the same state. They must be "persons of high moral character, impartiality and integrity who possess the qualifications required in their respective States for appointment to the highest judicial offices", and they must "have an excellent knowledge of and be fluent in at least one of the working languages of the Court" (English and French).

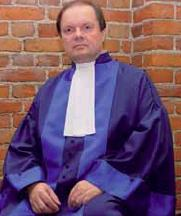
Former Judge Erkki Kourula

Judges are elected from two lists of candidates. List A comprises candidates who have "established competence in criminal law and procedure, and the necessary relevant experience, whether as judge, prosecutor, advocate or in other similar capacity, in criminal proceedings". List B comprises candidates who have "established competence in relevant areas of international law such as international humanitarian law and the law of human rights, and extensive experience in a professional legal capacity which is of relevance to the judicial work of the Court". Elections are organised so as to maintain at least nine judges from List A and at least five from List B on the court.

The Assembly of States Parties is required to "take into account the need for the representation of the principal legal systems of the world, equitable geographical representation and a fair representation of female and male judges. They shall take into account the need to include judges with legal expertise on specific issues, including, but not limited to, violence against women and children." For this purpose, voting requirements have been established that aim to maintain at least six female judges and at least six male judges on the court, and at least two from each regional group of the United Nations. If a regional group has more than sixteen states parties, the minimum voting requirement for this regional group increases by one. Therefore, since the Statute's entry into force for the Maldives on 1 December 2011, all regional groups can claim a third judge.

=== Elections ===
The following elections have taken place:

- In February 2003, the Assembly of States Parties elected the first bench of eighteen judges from a total of 43 candidates. After this first election, the President of the Assembly of States Parties drew lots to assign the eighteen judges to terms of three, six or nine years; those who served for three years were eligible for re-election in 2006. The first bench of judges was sworn in at the inaugural session of the court on 11 March 2003.
- The second election was held on 26 January 2006. Five of the six outgoing judges were re-elected, but Judge Tuiloma Neroni Slade was defeated. He was succeeded by Ekaterina Trendafilova.
- The first special election took place on 3 December 2007, to replace three judges who had resigned. The three new judges were assigned to serve the remaining portions of their predecessors' terms. Pursuant to a drawing of lots, Fumiko Saiga served the remainder of Claude Jorda's term, which expired on 10 March 2009. The other two new judges' terms ended on 10 March 2012.
- The third ordinary election took place on 19–20 January 2009. Twenty-one individuals were nominated to fill the six vacancies. Only one incumbent judge, Fumiko Saiga, was eligible for re-election; she ran and was elected.
- The second special election took place on 18 November 2009 to replace two judges who had died and resigned, respectively. Kuniko Ozaki of Japan and Silvia Fernández de Gurmendi were elected to serve until 2018.
- The fourth ordinary election took place during the 10th Session of the Assembly of States Parties from 12 to 21 December 2011. None of the six judges to be replaced were eligible for re-election.
- The third special election took place in November 2013 to replace a judge who had resigned.
- The fifth ordinary election took place in December 2014 to replace the judges elected in 2006.
- The fourth special election took place in June 2015 to replace a judge who had resigned.
- The sixth ordinary election took place in December 2017 to replace the judges elected in 2009.
- The seventh ordinary election took place in December 2020 to replace the judges whose terms ended in 2021. Four of those judges had been elected in 2011 for full nine-year terms; the other two had been elected in the special elections in 2013 and 2015 to replace two judges elected in 2011 who had resigned.
- The eighth ordinary election took place in December 2023 to replace the judges elected in 2014.
- The ninth ordinary election is scheduled to take place in December 2026 to replace 6 judges elected in 2017.

== Disqualification and removal from office ==
The prosecutor or any person being investigated or prosecuted may request the disqualification of a judge from "any case in which his or her impartiality might reasonably be doubted on any ground". Any request for the disqualification of a judge from a particular case is decided by an absolute majority of the other judges.

A judge may be removed from office if "found to have committed serious misconduct or a serious breach of his or her duties" or is unable to exercise his or her functions. The removal of a judge requires both a two-thirds majority of the other judges and a two-thirds majority of the states parties.

== Presidency ==
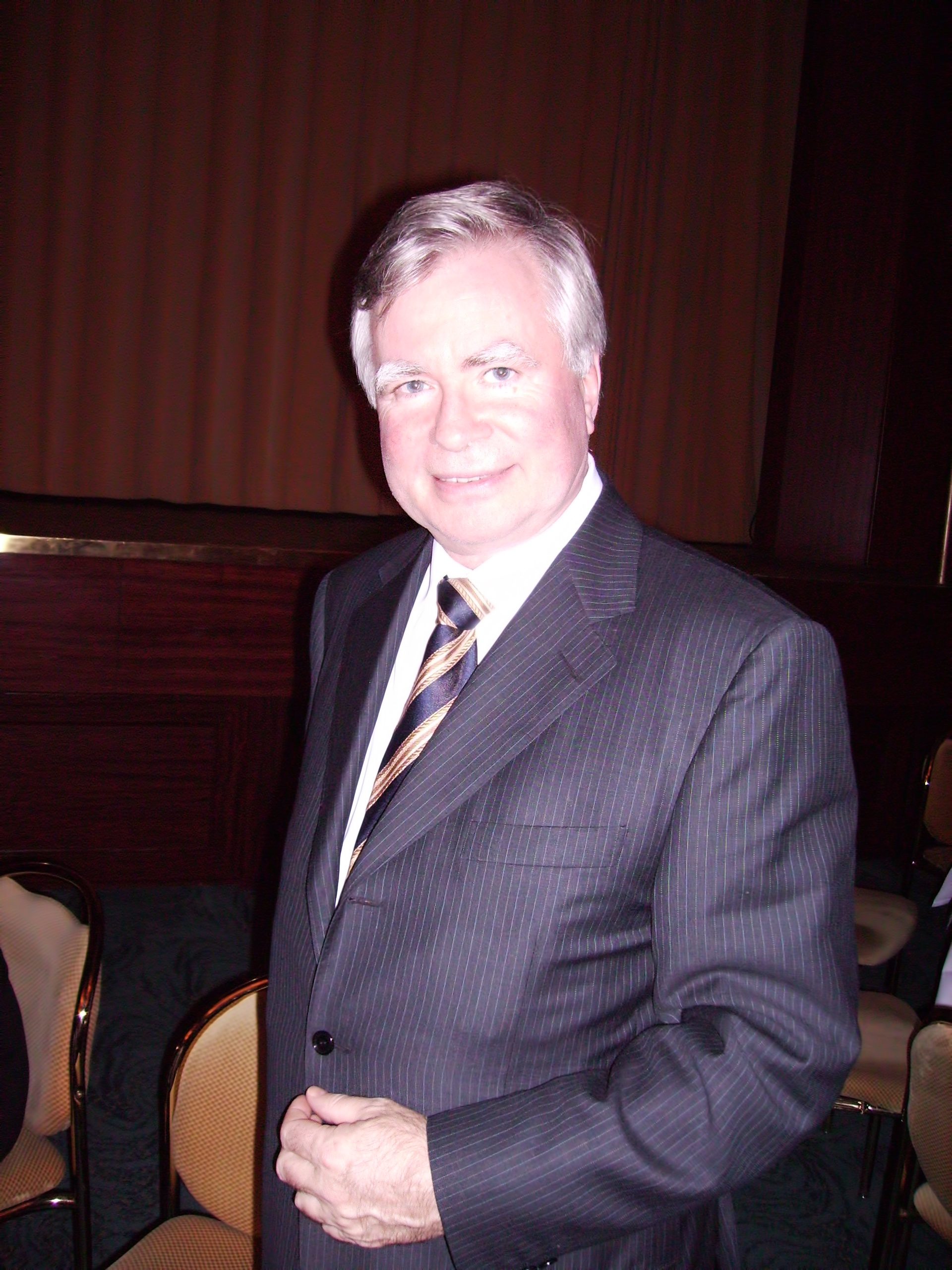
Judge Philippe Kirsch, the first President of the court

The Presidency is the organ responsible for the proper administration of the court, except for the Office of the Prosecutor. The Presidency oversees the activities of the Registry and organises the work of the judicial divisions. It also has some responsibilities in the area of external relations, such as negotiating agreements on behalf of the court and the promoting public awareness and understanding of the institution.

The Presidency comprises the President and the First and Second Vice-Presidents – three judges of the court who are elected to the Presidency by their fellow judges for a maximum of two three-year terms. The Presidents of the ICC were Philippe Kirsch, who served from 2003 to 2009, Sang-hyun Song from 2009 to 2015, Silvia Fernández de Gurmendi from 2015 to 2018, Chile Eboe-Osuji from 2018 to 2021 and Piotr Hofmański from 2021 to 2024. As of March 2024, the President is Tomoko Akane from Japan; Rosario Salvatore Aitala of Italy is First Vice-President and Reine Alapini-Gansou of Benin is Second Vice-President. All three were elected on 11 March 2024.

== Judicial divisions ==
The eighteen judges are organized into three divisions: the Pre-Trial Division, Trial Division and Appeals Division. The Pre-Trial Division (which comprises the Second Vice President and five other judges) confirms indictments and issues international arrest warrants. The Trial Division (the First Vice President and six other judges) presides over trials. Decisions of the Pre-Trial and Trial Divisions may be appealed to the Appeals Division (the President and four other judges). Judges are assigned to divisions according to their qualifications and experience.

== Current structure ==
=== Judges ===
As of July 2024, after the 2023 International Criminal Court judges election, there are 18 full-time judges serving their mandate.

Judges of the International Criminal Court (sortable)
Name	Country	Region	Gender	List	Took office	Term End	Division	Remark
Tomoko Akane	Japan	Asia & Pacific	Female	List A	2018	2027	Appeals	President
Rosario Salvatore Aitala	Italy	Western Europe & Others	Male	List A	2018	2027	Pre-Trial	First Vice-President
Reine Alapini-Gansou	Benin	Africa	Female	List B	2018	2027	Pre-Trial	Second Vice-President
Luz del Carmen Ibáñez Carranza	Peru	Latin America & Caribbean	Female	List A	2018	2027	Appeals	
Solomy Balungi Bossa	Uganda	Africa	Female	List A	2018	2027	Appeals	
Kimberly Prost	Canada	Western Europe & Others	Female	List A	2018	2027	Trial	
Joanna Korner	United Kingdom	Western Europe & Others	Female	List A	2021	2030	Trial	
Gocha Lordkipanidze	Georgia	Eastern Europe	Male	List B	2021	2030	Appeals	
Socorro Flores Liera	Mexico	Latin America & Caribbean	Female	List B	2021	2030	Pre-Trial	
Sergio Gerardo Ugalde Godínez	Costa Rica	Latin America & Caribbean	Male	List B	2021	2030	Pre-Trial	
Miatta Maria Samba	Sierra Leone	Africa	Female	List A	2021	2030	Trial	
Althea Violet Alexis-Windsor	Trinidad and Tobago	Latin America & Caribbean	Female	List A	2021	2030	Trial	
Keebong Paek	South Korea	Asia & Pacific	Male	List A	2024	2033	Trial	
Erdenebalsuren Damdin	Mongolia	Asia & Pacific	Male	List A	2024	2033	Appeals	
Iulia Motoc	Romania	Eastern Europe	Female	List B	2024	2033	Pre-Trial	
Haykel Ben Mahfoudh	Tunisia	Africa	Male	List B	2024	2033	Pre-Trial	
Nicolas Guillou	France	Western Europe & Others	Male	List A	2024	2033	Trial	
Beti Hohler	Slovenia	Eastern Europe	Female	List A	2024	2033	Trial	

As of July 2024, 11 of the 18 judges are female. The geographical representation is as follows:

Regional group	Number of judges
Western European and other states	4
African states	4
Latin American and Caribbean states	4
Eastern European states	3
Asian states	3

=== Chambers ===
The Judicial Chambers are organized into three main divisions. The Appeals Chamber consists of the whole Appeals Division whereas the Pre-Trial Chambers cover whole situations, authorizing as well the opening of investigation or cases. The Trial Chambers handle single cases (which can consist of one or more accused). As of 2026, the judges are assigned as follows:

Chamber	Members	Committed to
Appeals Division
Appeals	Akane, Ibáñez, Bossa, Lordkipanidze, Damdin	
Appeals	Bossa (Presiding), Ibáñez, Prost, Lordkipanidze, Damdin	Yekatom and Ngaïssona appeals (Central African Republic II)
Appeals	Damdin (Presiding), Ibáñez, Bossa, Lordkipanidze, Paek	Abd-Al-Rahman appeals (Darfur, Sudan)
Trial Division
Trial Chamber I	Korner (Presiding), Alapini-Gansou, Alexis-Windsor	Abd-Al-Rahman (Darfur, Sudan)
Trial Chamber II	Flores Liera (Presiding), Prost, Guillou	Lubanga (DR Congo), Katanga (DR Congo), Al Mahdi (Mali), Ongwen (Uganda)
Trial Chamber III	Korner (Presiding), Paek, Guillou	Duterte trial (Philippines)
Trial Chamber IV	Prost (Presiding), Paek, Guillou	Banda (Darfur, Sudan)
Trial Chamber V	Hohler (Presiding), Korner, Paek	Yekatom and Ngaïssona (Central African Republic II)
Trial Chamber VI	Samba (Presiding), Flores Liera, Ugalde, Paek (Alternate)	Said trial (Central African Republic II)
Trial Chamber VII	Alexis-Windsor (Presiding), Samba, Hohler	El Hishri trial (Libya)
Trial Chamber X	Prost (Presiding), Flores Liera, Paek	Al Hassan (Mali)
Pre-Trial Division
Pre-Trial Chamber I	Motoc (Presiding), Alapini-Gansou, Flores Liera	Democratic Republic of the Congo
Pre-Trial Chamber I	Motoc (Presiding), Alapini-Gansou, Flores Liera	Libya (UN Security Council Resolution 1970)
Pre-Trial Chamber I	Motoc (Presiding), Alapini-Gansou, Flores Liera	Mali
Pre-Trial Chamber I	Motoc (Presiding), Alapini-Gansou, Flores Liera	Bangladesh / Myanmar (Rohingya genocide)
Pre-Trial Chamber I	Motoc (Presiding), Alapini-Gansou, Flores Liera	Georgia
Pre-Trial Chamber I	Motoc (Presiding), Alapini-Gansou, Flores Liera	Venezuela I
Pre-Trial Chamber I	Motoc (Presiding), Alapini-Gansou, Flores Liera	Venezuela II
Pre-Trial Chamber I	Motoc (Presiding), Alapini-Gansou, Flores Liera	Republic of Lithuania / Republic of Belarus
Pre-Trial Chamber I	Guillou (Presiding), Alapini-Gansou, Hohler	Palestine
Pre-Trial Chamber II	Aitala (Presiding), Ugalde, Ben Mahfoudh	Central African Republic I
Pre-Trial Chamber II	Aitala (Presiding), Ugalde, Ben Mahfoudh	Central African Republic II
Pre-Trial Chamber II	Aitala (Presiding), Ugalde, Ben Mahfoudh	Darfur, Sudan (UN Security Council Resolution 1593)
Pre-Trial Chamber II	Aitala (Presiding), Ugalde, Ben Mahfoudh	Kenya
Pre-Trial Chamber II	Aitala (Presiding), Ugalde, Ben Mahfoudh	Cote d'Ivoire
Pre-Trial Chamber II	Aitala (Presiding), Ugalde, Ben Mahfoudh	Afghanistan
Pre-Trial Chamber II	Aitala (Presiding), Ugalde, Ben Mahfoudh	Burundi
Pre-Trial Chamber II	Aitala (Presiding), Ugalde, Ben Mahfoudh	Ukraine
Pre-Trial Chamber III	Alexis-Windsor (Presiding), Motoc, Ben Mahfoudh	Uganda

== Former judges ==
Former judges of the International Criminal Court, as of July 2024
Name	Country	Region	Gender	List	Took office	Term End	Notes
Tuiloma Neroni Slade	Samoa	Asia & Pacific	Male	List A	2003	2006	Defeated in 2006 election.
Maureen Harding Clark	Ireland	Western Europe and Others	Female	List A	2003	2006	Resigned to serve on the High Court of Ireland.
Claude Jorda	France	Western Europe and Others	Male	List A	2003	2007	Resigned "for reasons of permanent ill-health".
Karl Hudson-Phillips	Trinidad and Tobago	Latin America & Caribbean	Male	List A	2003	2007	Resigned "for personal reasons".
Navanethem Pillay	South Africa	Africa	Female	List B	2003	2008	Resigned to serve as United Nations High Commissioner for Human Rights.
Philippe Kirsch	Canada	Western Europe & Others	Male	List B	2003	2009	
Georghios Pikis	Cyprus	Asia & Pacific	Male	List A	2003	2009	
Mauro Politi	Italy	Western Europe & Others	Male	List B	2003	2009	
Fumiko Saiga	Japan	Asia & Pacific	Female	List B	2007, 2009	2009	Died in office.
Daniel Nsereko	Uganda	Africa	Male	List A	2007	2012	
René Blattmann	Bolivia	Latin America & Caribbean	Male	List B	2003	2012	Term extended from 2009 to complete the Lubanga trial.
Adrian Fulford	United Kingdom	Western Europe & Others	Male	List A	2003	2012	Term extended in 2012 to complete the Lubanga trial.
Elizabeth Odio Benito	Costa Rica	Latin America & Caribbean	Female	List A	2003	2012	Term extended in 2012 to complete the Lubanga trial.
Anthony Carmona	Trinidad and Tobago	Latin America & Caribbean	Male	List A	2012	2013	Resigned to become President of Trinidad and Tobago.
Fatoumata Dembélé Diarra	Mali	Africa	Female	List A	2003	2014	Term extended from 2012 to complete the Katanga trial.
Bruno Cotte	France	Western Europe & Others	Male	List A	2007	2014	Term extended from 2012 to complete the Katanga trial.
Miriam Defensor Santiago	Philippines	Asia & Pacific	Female	List B	2012	2014	Resigned due to health issues.
Hans-Peter Kaul	Germany	Western Europe & Others	Male	List B	2003, 2006	2014	Resigned due to health issues.
Erkki Kourula	Finland	Western Europe & Others	Male	List B	2003, 2006	2015	
Akua Kuenyehia	Ghana	Africa	Female	List B	2003, 2006	2015	
Sang-Hyun Song	South Korea	Asia & Pacific	Male	List A	2003, 2006	2015	
Anita Ušacka	Latvia	Eastern Europe	Female	List B	2003, 2006	2015	
Ekaterina Trendafilova	Bulgaria	Eastern Europe	Female	List A	2006	2015	
Sylvia Steiner	Brazil	Latin America & Caribbean	Female	List A	2003	2016	Term extended from 2012 to complete the Bemba trial.
Sanji Monageng	Botswana	Africa	Female	List B	2009	2018	
Chris van den Wyngaert	Belgium	Western Europe & Others	Female	List A	2009	2018	
Joyce Aluoch	Kenya	Africa	Female	List A	2009	2018	
Silvia Fernández de Gurmendi	Argentina	Latin America & Caribbean	Female	List A	2009	2018	
Cuno Tarfusser	Italy	Western Europe & Others	Male	List A	2009	2019	Term extended from 2018 to complete the Gbagbo and Blé Goudé trial.
Kuniko Ozaki	Japan	Asia & Pacific	Female	List B	2009	2019	Term extended part-time from 2018 to complete the Ntaganda trial.
Chile Eboe-Osuji	Nigeria	Africa	Male	List A	2012	2021	
Robert Fremr	Czech Republic	Eastern Europe	Male	List A	2012	2021	
Geoffrey Henderson	Trinidad and Tobago	Latin America & Caribbean	Male	List A	2014	2021	
Olga Venecia Herrera Carbuccia	Dominican Republic	Latin America & Caribbean	Female	List A	2012	2021	
Howard Morrison	United Kingdom	Western Europe & Others	Male	List A	2012	2021	
Raul Cano Pangalangan	Philippines	Asia & Pacific	Male	List B	2015	2021	Term extended in 2021 to complete the Ongwen trial.
Piotr Hofmański	Poland	Eastern Europe	Male	List A	2015	2024	
Marc Perrin de Brichambaut	France	Western Europe & Others	Male	List B	2015	2024	
Antoine Kesia-Mbe Mindua	DR Congo	Africa	Male	List B	2015	2024	Term extended in 2024 to complete the Al Hassan trial.
Chung Chang-ho	South Korea	Asia & Pacific	Male	List A	2015	2025	Term extended in 2024 to complete the Yekatom and Ngaïssona trial.
Bertram Schmitt	Germany	Western Europe & Others	Male	List A	2015	2025	Term extended in 2024 to complete the Yekatom and Ngaïssona trial.
Péter Kovács	Hungary	Eastern Europe	Male	List B	2015	2025	Term extended in 2024 to complete the Yekatom and Ngaïssona trial.

Mohamed Shahabuddeen of Guyana was elected to the court in January 2009 but he resigned for personal reasons before taking office.

== Classes of judges ==
In 2003, the first judges were divided into three different classes of terms: those with term ending in 2006 (and re-eligible), those with term ending in 2009 and those with term ending in 2012. This list shows to which class the different judges belong.

Classes of judges' terms
Period	Class of judges with initial term ending in 2006	Class of judges with initial term ending in 2009	Class of judges with initial term ending in 2012	Period
2003–2006	Kaul, Kourula, Kuenyehia, Slade, Song, Ušacka	Blattmann, Jorda, Kirsch, Pikis, Pillay, Politi; Jorda resigned in 2007; Saiga elected in 2007; Pillay resigned in 2008	Clark, Diarra, Fulford, Hudson-Phillips, Odio Benito, Steiner; Clark resigned in 2006; Hudson-Phillips resigned in 2007; Cotte, Nsereko elected in 2007	2003–2006
2006–2009	Kaul, Kourula, Kuenyehia, Song, Trendafilova, Ušacka; Kaul resigned in 2014	Blattmann, Jorda, Kirsch, Pikis, Pillay, Politi; Jorda resigned in 2007; Saiga elected in 2007; Pillay resigned in 2008	Clark, Diarra, Fulford, Hudson-Phillips, Odio Benito, Steiner; Clark resigned in 2006; Hudson-Phillips resigned in 2007; Cotte, Nsereko elected in 2007	2006–2009
2009–2012	Kaul, Kourula, Kuenyehia, Song, Trendafilova, Ušacka; Kaul resigned in 2014	Aluoch, Monageng, Saiga, (Shahabuddeen), Tarfusser, Van den Wyngaert; Shahabuddeen did not take office in 2009; Saiga died in 2009; Fernandez de Gurmendi, Ozaki elected in 2009	Clark, Diarra, Fulford, Hudson-Phillips, Odio Benito, Steiner; Clark resigned in 2006; Hudson-Phillips resigned in 2007; Cotte, Nsereko elected in 2007	2009–2012
2012–2015	Kaul, Kourula, Kuenyehia, Song, Trendafilova, Ušacka; Kaul resigned in 2014	Aluoch, Monageng, Saiga, (Shahabuddeen), Tarfusser, Van den Wyngaert; Shahabuddeen did not take office in 2009; Saiga died in 2009; Fernandez de Gurmendi, Ozaki elected in 2009	Carmona, Defensor-Santiago, Eboe-Osuji, Fremr, Herrera Carbuccia, Morrison; Carmona resigned in 2013; Henderson elected in 2013; Defensor-Santiago resigned in 2014; Pangalangan elected in 2015	2012–2015
2015–2018	Chung, Hofmański, Kovács, Mindua, Perrin de Brichambaut, Schmitt	Aluoch, Monageng, Saiga, (Shahabuddeen), Tarfusser, Van den Wyngaert; Shahabuddeen did not take office in 2009; Saiga died in 2009; Fernandez de Gurmendi, Ozaki elected in 2009	Carmona, Defensor-Santiago, Eboe-Osuji, Fremr, Herrera Carbuccia, Morrison; Carmona resigned in 2013; Henderson elected in 2013; Defensor-Santiago resigned in 2014; Pangalangan elected in 2015	2015–2018
2018–2021	Chung, Hofmański, Kovács, Mindua, Perrin de Brichambaut, Schmitt	Ibáñez, Akane, Alapini-Gansou, Bossa, Prost, Aitala elected in 2017	Carmona, Defensor-Santiago, Eboe-Osuji, Fremr, Herrera Carbuccia, Morrison; Carmona resigned in 2013; Henderson elected in 2013; Defensor-Santiago resigned in 2014; Pangalangan elected in 2015	2018–2021
2021–2024	Chung, Hofmański, Kovács, Mindua, Perrin de Brichambaut, Schmitt	Ibáñez, Akane, Alapini-Gansou, Bossa, Prost, Aitala elected in 2017	Korner, Lordkipanidze, Samba, Flores Liera, Ugalde, Alexis-Windsor elected in 2020	2021–2024
2024-2027	Damdin, Motoc, Guillou, Hohler, Ben Mahfoudh, Paek elected in 2023	Ibáñez, Akane, Alapini-Gansou, Bossa, Prost, Aitala elected in 2017	Korner, Lordkipanidze, Samba, Flores Liera, Ugalde, Alexis-Windsor elected in 2020	2024-2027
2027-2030	Damdin, Motoc, Guillou, Hohler, Ben Mahfoudh, Paek elected in 2023		Korner, Lordkipanidze, Samba, Flores Liera, Ugalde, Alexis-Windsor elected in 2020	2027-2030
