= Tomoko Akane =

President of the ICC since 2024

- 赤根 智子
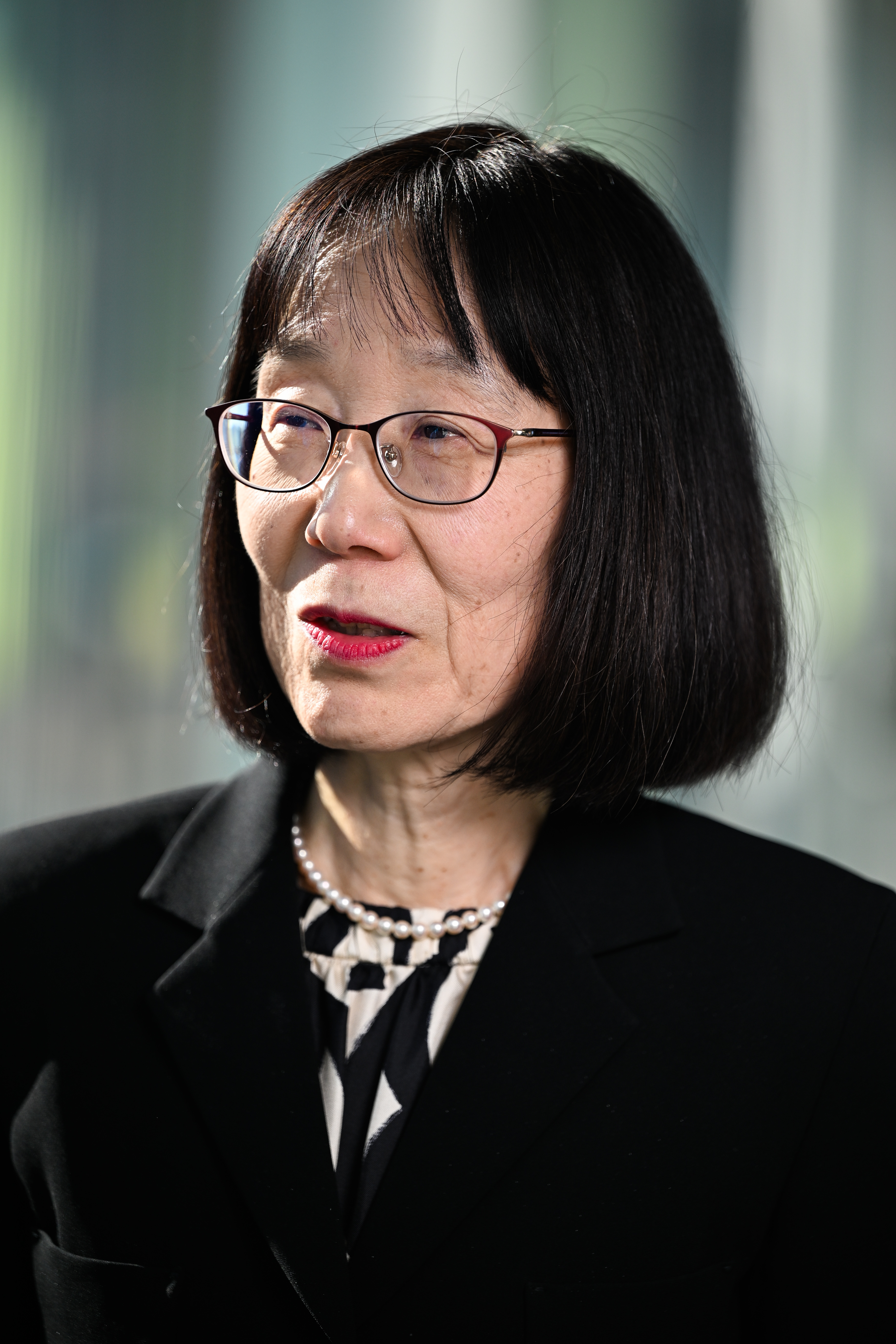
- Akane in 2025

6th President of the International Criminal Court
- Incumbent
- Assumed office 11 March 2024
- Appointed by: Judges of the ICC
- Preceded by: Piotr Hofmański

Judge of the International Criminal Court
- Incumbent
- Assumed office 11 March 2018
- Nominated by: Japan
- Appointed by: Assembly of States Parties

Personal details
- Born: 28 June 1956 (age 70) Nagoya, Japan
- Education: University of Tokyo; Jacksonville State University

Tomoko Akane (Japanese: 赤根智子; born 28 June 1956) is a Japanese jurist and current judge at the International Criminal Court (ICC) for Japan, as well as the president of the court. She is the first Japanese to serve as president of the court. Prior to her election to the ICC, she served in various legal roles in Japan, including as chief prosecutor of the Hakodate district in Hokkaido. As an ICC judge, she has had to deal with criticism and sanctions, including from Russia and the United States over the prosecution of the Russian Invasion of Ukraine and Israel, respectively.

== Early life and education ==
Akane was born on 28 June 1956 in Nagoya. She graduated from Aichi Prefectural Asahigaoka Senior High School. Akane studied law at the University of Tokyo from 1975, graduating with a Bachelor of Law degree in 1980 from the Faculty of Law. She became a public prosecutor in 1982 and earned a Master of Science in Criminal Justice from Jacksonville State University in December 1990.

== Professional career ==
Akane became a public prosecutor in 1982. During her career, she assumed posts at different levels of the justice system. Akane was a professor in criminal justice practice at both the Chukyo University Law School and the Nagoya University Law School between 2005 and 2009. In Nagoya, she researched criminal justice reform between 2005 and 2006. She was the head of the International Cooperation Department (ICD) in the Japanese Ministry of Justice between 2009 and 2010. Akane was chief prosecutor of the Hakodate district in Hokkaido between 2010 and 2012, and became a prosecutor at the Supreme Public Prosecutors Office in 2012. As prosecutor, she took on a broad range of legal cases and revising the Japanese juvenile law.

She was involved in the activities of the United Nations Asia and Far East Institute for the Prevention of Crime and the Treatment of Offenders (UNAFEI) for more than seven years and served as the director of the UNAFEI between July 2013 and October 2014. During her work for the UNAFEI, she was twice deployed to Kenya, where she was involved in the training of probation officers. From 2014 to 2016, she was the director-general of the Research and Training Institute of the Ministry of Justice. From 2016 until joining the ICC, she served as Japan's ambassador for international judicial cooperation. Akane valued the ability of judicial systems to prevent people from reoffending. She provided legal assistance to prosecutors and judges from other countries for more than nine years.

== Judge at the International Criminal Court ==
Akane was nominated as a candidate to the ICC in April 2016 by the Government of Japan and elected as a judge of the ICC on the 4 December 2017 by the Assembly of State Parties in New York. She is the first Japanese legal professional to hold the post. Japan became a member of the ICC in 2007 and the Ministry of Foreign Affairs stated that her appointment represents Japan's efforts to providing justice in the ICC. She stated that she was happy to accept the post and hoped that it would inspire young people to join the ICC. She assumed her post in March 2018 for a tenure of nine years. As a pre-trial judge at the ICC she was mainly assigned to Pre-Trial Chamber II.

She has participated in the Sudan-related trials of Omar al-Bashir, Abdel Rahim Mohammed Hussein, Ahmad Harun, and Ali Kushayb between 2018 and 2024; the Central African Republic-related trials of Patrice-Edouard Ngaïssona and Alfred Yekatom between 2021 and 2024; and the trials of Joseph Kony and Simone Gbagbo between 2018 and 2021.

On 20 March 2023, Russia initiated a criminal investigation against Akane, Rosario Salvatore Aitala and Sergio Gerardo Ugalde Godínez in response to an arrest warrant issued on 17 March 2023 against its president Vladimir Putin for the unlawful deportations of Ukrainian children to Russia during the Russian-Ukrainian war. In July 2023, the Russian Ministry of Internal Affairs issued a warrant for her arrest. In March 2024 she was elected President of the International Criminal Court for the term 2024–2027 by the judges of the ICC. After being elected she stated that she felt "deeply honoured to have been elected" and that she would "focus on fostering dialogue amongst the organs of the Court, and defence and victims’ representatives, as well as in reinforcing the dialogue with States Parties and States that have not yet ratified the Rome Statute" and would "also prioritise the security and well-being of the Court’s personnel." She is the first Japanese person to head the ICC. According to The Yomiuri Shimbun, her election as president reflects Japan's call for the rule of law and its large financial contributions, accounting for 15% of the ICC's budget.

Akane's personal page on the Specially Designated Nationals and Blocked Persons List.

On 12 December 2025, a Moscow court sentenced nine ICC judges, including Akane, to 3.5 to 15 years in prison in absentia for issuing arrest warrants for president Putin and others, but the individual sentences are unknown. Akane criticized Russia's arrest warrants and default indictments and trials against ICC officials as coercive measures that would undermine the existence and reputation of the ICC, the integrity of its judicial procedures and the safety of its officials, and declared that the ICC would not accept any pressure.

On 18 August 2026, Akane was sanctioned by the U.S. State Department in furtherance of its diplomatic campaign to dismantle the International Criminal Court "brick by brick". Secretary of State Marco Rubio said in a statement that Akane and Abdoulaye Seye "have directly engaged in efforts by the ICC to investigate, arrest, detain, or prosecute officials whose government has not consented to ICC jurisdiction." On 21 August, Akane issued a statement on X saying "The sanction against me this time was something I had anticipated to an extent, so I'm not surprised. The important thing is not to let this be the beginning of the demise of international rule of law." On 1 October, a group of lawyers submitted a petition that gathered 174,600 signatures to the Government of Japan asking it to hold talks with the United States about withdrawing its sanctions against Akane.
