= Solome Bossa =

Judge of the High Court of Uganda

Honorable Lady Justice Solomy B. Bossa

Judge of the International Criminal Court
- Incumbent
- Assumed office 11 March 2018
- Nominated by: Uganda
- Appointed by: Assembly of States Parties

Personal details
- Born: 14 April 1956 (age 70) Nsambya Hospital, Uganda
- Education: Makerere University; Law Development Centre; Commonwealth Youth Centre; University of London

Solome Balungi Bossa (also Hon. Lady Justice Solomy B. Bossa; born 14 April 1956) is a Ugandan judge on the International Criminal Court. Prior to her election to the court, she was a member of the Court of Appeal in Uganda, which also doubles as the Constitutional Court in the Judiciary of Uganda. She was elected to a nine-year term on 5 December 2017 and was sworn in on 9 March 2018. Previously she was appointed to a six-year term on the African Court on Human and Peoples' Rights in 2014.

== Early life and education ==
Solome Bossa was born on 14 April 1956 in Nsambya Hospital, in Uganda's capital city of Kampala. Her father, Stanley Walusimbi Ssesanga, was a lawyer and her mother was a housewife.

Bossa attended Ugandan schools for her primary and secondary school education. In 1976, she was admitted to Makerere University, in Kampala, to study law. She graduated with a Bachelor of Laws (LLB) degree in 1979. She obtained a Diploma in Legal Practice from the Law Development Centre in Kampala. In 1987, she obtained a Certificate in Law Reporting, from the Commonwealth Youth Centre, in Lusaka, Zambia. Later, in 2016, she was awarded a Master of Laws (LLM) degree, by the University of London, specializing in Public International Law.

== Activism ==
Bossa has been a human rights activist since 1980 and founded non-profit organisation including the East African Centre for Constitutional Development, the Uganda Network on HIV, AIDS, Ethics and the Law and the Uganda Law Society.

== Career ==
Bossa was a lecturer at the Law Development Centre of Uganda from 1981 until 1997. She was a legal practitioner from 1988 until 1997, representing indigent women and expanding legal aid, including serving as president of the Uganda Law Society.

She served as Judge at the Uganda High Court from 1997 until 2013. Bossa was a member of the East African Court of Justice for five years, from 2001 until 2006. She was a member of the International Criminal Tribunal for Rwanda (UNICTR) from 2003 until 2013. Bossa was a judge on the East African Court of Justice from 2001 until 2006 and on the International Criminal Tribunal for Rwanda from 2003 until 2013. She was appointed to the Ugandan Constitutional Court in 2013. In 2014, Bossa was elected Judge of the African Court on Human and Peoples’ Rights, for a six-year term.

In 2014, Bossa was one of the judges who annulled Uganda's Anti-Homosexuality Act for not being passed with the required quorum. She received death threats on social media.

In 2017, Bossa became a nominee for the International Criminal Court and was elected later that year.

== U.S. Sanctions ==
In June 2025, she was among the 4 judges of the International Criminal Court who were sanctioned by the Trump administration. She along with her colleague, judge Ibanez Carranza, was targeted for being one of the 5 judges of the Appeals chamber that in 2020 authorized the ICC Prosecutor to continue investigating the situation in Afghanistan, including US and NATO personnel - the move which was opposed by the US.

== Other activities ==
- International Commission of Jurists, Member
- International Association of Women Judges, Member
- East African Judges and Magistrate Association, Member
- National Association of Women Judges, Member
- Uganda Association of Judges and Magistrates, Member

== Personal life ==
Bossa has been married to Joseph Bossa, a lawyer and Uganda People's Congress politician, since 1981. She is the mother of four children.

== Publications ==
- Bossa, Solomy Balungi (2010). "A Critique of the East African Court of Justice As A Human Rights Court". In C. Eboe-Osuji (ed.). Protecting Humanity: Essays in International Law and Policy in Honour of Navanethem Pillay. Martinus Nijhoff. pp. 333–348. doi:10.1163/ej.9789004183780.i-882.72. ISBN 9789004189577.
- Bossa, Solomy Balungi (2006). "Towards a protocol extending the jurisdiction of the East African Court of Justice". East African Journal of Human Rights & Democracy. 4: 31.

== See also ==
- Julia Sebutinde
