= Chung Chang-ho =

South Korean judge

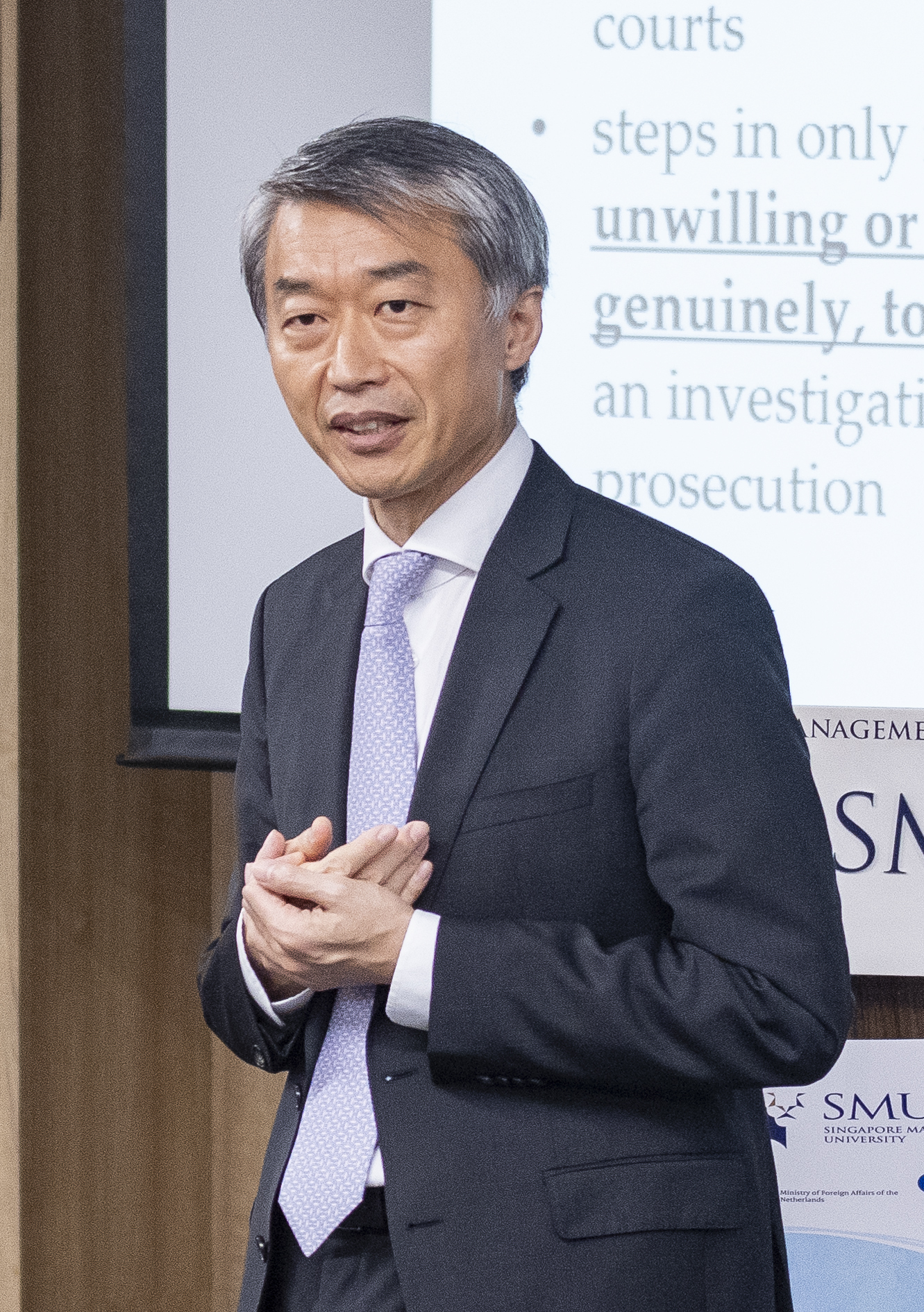
- Chung in 2018

Judge of the International Criminal Court
- In office 11 March 2015 – 24 July 2025
- Nominated by: South Korea
- Appointed by: Assembly of States Parties

Judge of the Extraordinary Chambers in the Courts of Cambodia
- In office 1 August 2011 – 28 February 2015

Personal details
- Born: February 17, 1967 (age 58)

Chung Chang-ho (Korean: 정창호; born February 17, 1967) is a South Korean judge who served as a judge of the International Criminal Court (ICC) from 2015 to 2025. He is the second South Korean to serve on the Court, following former president Song Sang-hyun.

== Education and career ==
Chung was born on February 17, 1967 in South Korea and holds a B.A. in Law and an LL.M. in International Law from Seoul National University. He was a court martial judge in the Republic of Korea Air Force for three years from 1993 to 1996. Chung also served eight years as a district court judge and six years as a high court judge before his mandate at the ECCC. He was a research scholar at the London School of Economics and Political Science in 2001 and at the University of Hong Kong in 2005. Chung also served as a legal advisor and the South Korean delegate to the United Nations Commission on International Trade Law (UNCITRAL) at the South Korean embassy in Vienna, Austria, between 2008 and 2009.

Chung then served as a United Nations International Judge in the Extraordinary Chambers in the Courts of Cambodia (ECCC) in Phnom Penh, Cambodia, from 2011 to 2015. There, he was a member of the Rules and Procedure Committee and the Judicial Administration Committee.

Chung was elected to the International Criminal Court from the Asian Group of States, list A, for a term of nine years beginning 11 March 2015 and ending on the same day in 2024. He was assigned first to the Pre-Trial Division and then to the Trial Division. In 2021, he was the presiding judge in the proceedings that resulted in Congolese militia leader Bosco Ntaganda being sentenced to pay child soldiers and other victims a total of $30 million compensation, the Court's highest ever reparation order. His nine-year term ended in March 2024, but he continued in office until July 2025 pursuant to Article 36 (10) of the Rome Statute to complete the trial of Alfred Yekatom and Patrice-Edouard Ngaïssona.

== Publications ==
Chung has published extensively, most recently in the Harvard International Law Journal, echoing his long-standing opinion that the Asia-Pacific should move to create a regional court of human rights.
