= Kimberly Prost =

Canadian jurist (born 1958)

Judge of the International Criminal Court
- Incumbent
- Assumed office 11 March 2018
- Nominated by: Canada
- Appointed by: Assembly of States Parties

Chef de Cabinet to the President of the International Criminal Court
- In office 2016–2018

Ombudsperson of the UN Security Council Al-Qaida Sanctions Committee
- In office 2010–2015

Judge of the International Criminal Tribunal for the former Yugoslavia
- In office 3 July 2006 – 31 March 2010

Personal details
- Born: June 4, 1958 (age 68)

Kimberly Prost (born June 4, 1958) is a Canadian jurist currently serving as a judge of the International Criminal Court, assigned to the Trial Division. She was elected to a nine-year term on December 5, 2017, was sworn in on March 9, 2018, and assumed full-time duty on June 11, 2018.

== Biography ==
Prost grew up in the Fort Rouge neighbourhood of Winnipeg; her mother was a homemaker and her father a brewery worker and hotel owner. Prost attended high school in Winnipeg at St. Mary's Academy.

Prost graduated as a gold medalist from the Faculty of Law at the University of Manitoba. She joined the Canadian Department of Justice in 1982 and worked for five years at the Winnipeg regional office as a federal prosecutor. In 1987, she joined the Department of Justice's Crimes against Humanity and War Crimes Unit in Ottawa, and worked as head of the Baltic team on possible prosecutions for genocide, war crimes and crimes against humanity. In 1990, she took a position within the Department of Justice's International Assistance Group, which acts as Canada's central authority for international cooperation on criminal matters, and was named the Director of the IAG in 1994. As Director of the IAG, she participated in the negotiation of over 40 bilateral extradition and mutual legal assistance treaties for Canada with other countries.

During her time with the Department of Justice, she joined the Canadian delegation for the negotiations of the Rome Statute for an International Criminal Court and she participated in the negotiation of the related Rules of Procedure and Evidence. She was on the Canadian delegation to the Ad Hoc Committee for the negotiation of the United Nations Convention against Transnational Organized Crime and the UN Convention against Corruption.

After she left the Department of Justice, from 2000 to 2005 Prost served in the Commonwealth Secretariat as Head of the Criminal Law Section and Deputy Director of the Legal and Constitutional Affairs Division. She ran an intensive pan-Commonwealth program on counter-terrorism legislation and implementation of the relevant international instruments, as well as police and prosecutor training in the investigation and prosecution of terrorism and terrorist financing. She has also managed a project which brought together experts to develop model legislation for implementation of the Rome Statute.

From 2005 to 2006 Prost managed the Legal Advisory Section of the United Nations Office on Drugs and Crime.

In 2006, Prost became an ad litem judge of the International Criminal Tribunal for the former Yugoslavia, the third Canadian to have served as a judge on the Tribunal (following Jules Deschênes and Sharon Williams). As judge on the Tribunal, Prost served on the multi-accused trial of Popović et al. She was also a Pre-trial and Presiding Judge in the Tolimir case.

From 2010 to 2015 Prost was the first ombudsperson of the UN Security Council Al-Qaida Sanctions Committee, tasked with advising the Committee and making recommendations on requests from individuals or organizations who are subject to global sanctions, such as asset freezes and travel bans, as a result of "listing" by this committee.

From 2016 until her election as a judge of the International Criminal Court (ICC), Prost was Chef de Cabinet to the President of the ICC.

In December 2017, Prost was elected by the Assembly of States Parties to the Rome Statute as a judge of the ICC, in the sixth round of voting, receiving 92 of 123 votes cast. She is the second Canadian to serve as judge of the ICC (the first was Philippe Kirsch).

She is a member of the Crimes Against Humanity Initiative Advisory Council, a project of the Whitney R. Harris World Law Institute at Washington University School of Law to establish the world's first treaty on the prevention and punishment of crimes against humanity.

== U.S. sanctions ==
On August 20, 2025, the United States government imposed sanctions on her for her involvement in ICC investigations of American and Israeli officials. In March 2020, Prost was part of a unanimous decision by an ICC appeals chamber to confirm an ICC investigation into alleged war crimes and crimes against humanity after 2003 during the war in Afghanistan.

The ICC condemned the move as "a flagrant attack" on the impartiality and independence of the judicial institution. France and other countries immediately and similarly criticized the sanctions. At the end of August, Canadian Foreign Affairs Minister Anita Anand's office said that the matter had been brought up with Secretary of State Marco Rubio during a meeting that week. On September 2, Anand released a statement saying that she had spoken with Prost, that she was confident that Prost was objective and impartial, and that the ICC dealt with "vital work", but did not mention the sanctions.
