= Bertram Schmitt =

German judge

Judge of the International Criminal Court
- In office 11 March 2015 – 24 July 2025
- Nominated by: Germany
- Appointed by: Assembly of States Parties

Personal details
- Born: 9 September 1958 (age 68) Dieburg, Hesse, West Germany (now Germany)
- Education: Goethe University Frankfurt

Bertram Schmitt (born September 9, 1958) is a German jurist. He was a judge at the Bundesgerichtshof from 2005 to 2015 and a judge of the International Criminal Court from 2015 to 2025.

== Career ==
=== Early career ===
Between 2005 and 2015, Schmitt served as judge at the Federal Court of Justice (BGH), Germany's supreme court for civil and criminal matters.

In 2009, Schmitt was appointed as an ad-hoc judge at the European Court of Human Rights (ECHR). From 2009, he represented Germany on the Eurojust Joint Supervisory Body in The Hague.

Since 2000, Schmitt has been an adjunct professor for criminal law, criminal procedure and criminology at the University of Würzburg. He is one of two authors of the standard German commentary on criminal procedure, which includes the annotation of the European Convention on Human Rights (ECtHR). In 2010, he unsuccessfully ran against Angelika Nußberger in the election to succeed Renate Jaeger as the judge representing Germany at the European Court of Human Rights.

=== Judge of the International Criminal Court, 2015-2025 ===
In December 2014, Schmitt was proposed as a judge at the International Criminal Court by the German government. On December 10, 2014, he was elected in the sixth ballot, and he assumed office on March 11, 2015. He serves in the trial division of the court.

In his capacity as judge on the Trial Chamber VII, Schmitt in 2017 added a year to Jean-Pierre Bemba's 18-year jail term following his conviction for attempting to bribe witnesses during his war crimes trial.

In September 2023, Russia issued an arrest warrant for Schmitt on unspecified charges, allegedly in retaliation for the ICC having issued a warrant against President Vladimir Putin.

His nine-year term at the ICC ended in March 2024, but he continued in office until July 2025 pursuant to Article 36 (10) of the Rome Statute to complete the trial of Alfred Yekatom and Patrice-Edouard Ngaïssona.
