= Piotr Hofmański =

President of the ICC from 2021 to 2024

His Excellency The Honourable Piotr Hofmański
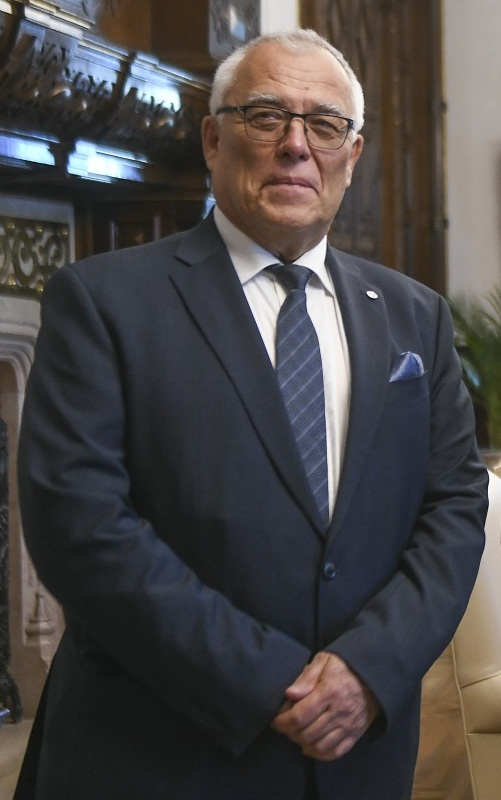
- Hofmański in 2022

5th President of the International Criminal Court
- In office 11 March 2021 – 10 March 2024
- Appointed by: Judges of the ICC
- Preceded by: Chile Eboe-Osuji
- Succeeded by: Tomoko Akane

Judge of the International Criminal Court
- In office 11 March 2015 – 10 March 2024
- Nominated by: Poland
- Appointed by: Assembly of States Parties

Personal details
- Born: Piotr Józef Hofmański; 6 March 1956 (age 70) Poznań, Poland
- Education: Nicolaus Copernicus University in Toruń; University of Silesia in Katowice
- Occupation: Jurist

Piotr Józef Hofmański (born 6 March 1956) is a Polish jurist who served as President of the International Criminal Court (ICC) from 2021 to 2024 and as a judge of the ICC from 2015 to 2024. Prior to this tenure, Hofmański was a legal expert and advisor at the Council of Europe.

== Early life and education ==
Piotr Hofmański was born in Poznań, Polish People's Republic on 6 March 1956. He obtained his master of laws degree from the Nicolaus Copernicus University in Toruń in 1978. He got his doctor of laws degree from the same university in 1981. He habilitated at the University of Silesia in Katowice in 1990.

== Council of Europe ==
In 2001–2002 he was working as an expert at the Council of Europe in the Reflection Group on developments in international cooperation in criminal matters and in 2004–2006 in the Committee of Experts on Transnational Justice.

== Judge ==
He began his career as a judge on the bench of the appellate court in Białystok in 1994. In 1996–2015 he was a judge in the Criminal Chamber of the Supreme Court of Poland. In 1999 he served as the court's spokesperson.

In December 2014 he was elected as a judge of the International Criminal Court for the 2015–2024 term. He was the first person from Poland elected to that post. He was officially sworn in on 10 March 2015 with five other judges. In March 2021 he was elected President of the International Criminal Court for the term 2021–2024. He served with judges Luz del Carmen Ibáñez Carranza and Antoine Kesia-Mbe Mindua as his Vice-presidents.

In September 2023, Russia issued an arrest warrant for Hofmański on unspecified charges, allegedly in retaliation for the ICC having issued a warrant against President Vladimir Putin. On 12 December 2025 Moscow City Court sentenced him in absentia to a prison term.

On December 3, 2024, judge Hofmański was appointed as a judge of the Kosovo Specialist Chambers and assigned to the Constitutional Court within the tribunal.

== Decorations ==
In 2000 he was awarded the Silver Cross of Merit by the President Aleksander Kwaśniewski.

== Personal life ==
He is fluent in Polish, English and German. He is married and has three daughters.

== Publications ==
Hofmański authored and co-authored more than 300 publications regarding various aspects of criminal law and procedure, international cooperation in criminal matters and human rights protection. Many of his publications have been written and published in German and/or English.
