= Reine Alapini-Gansou =

Beninese jurist

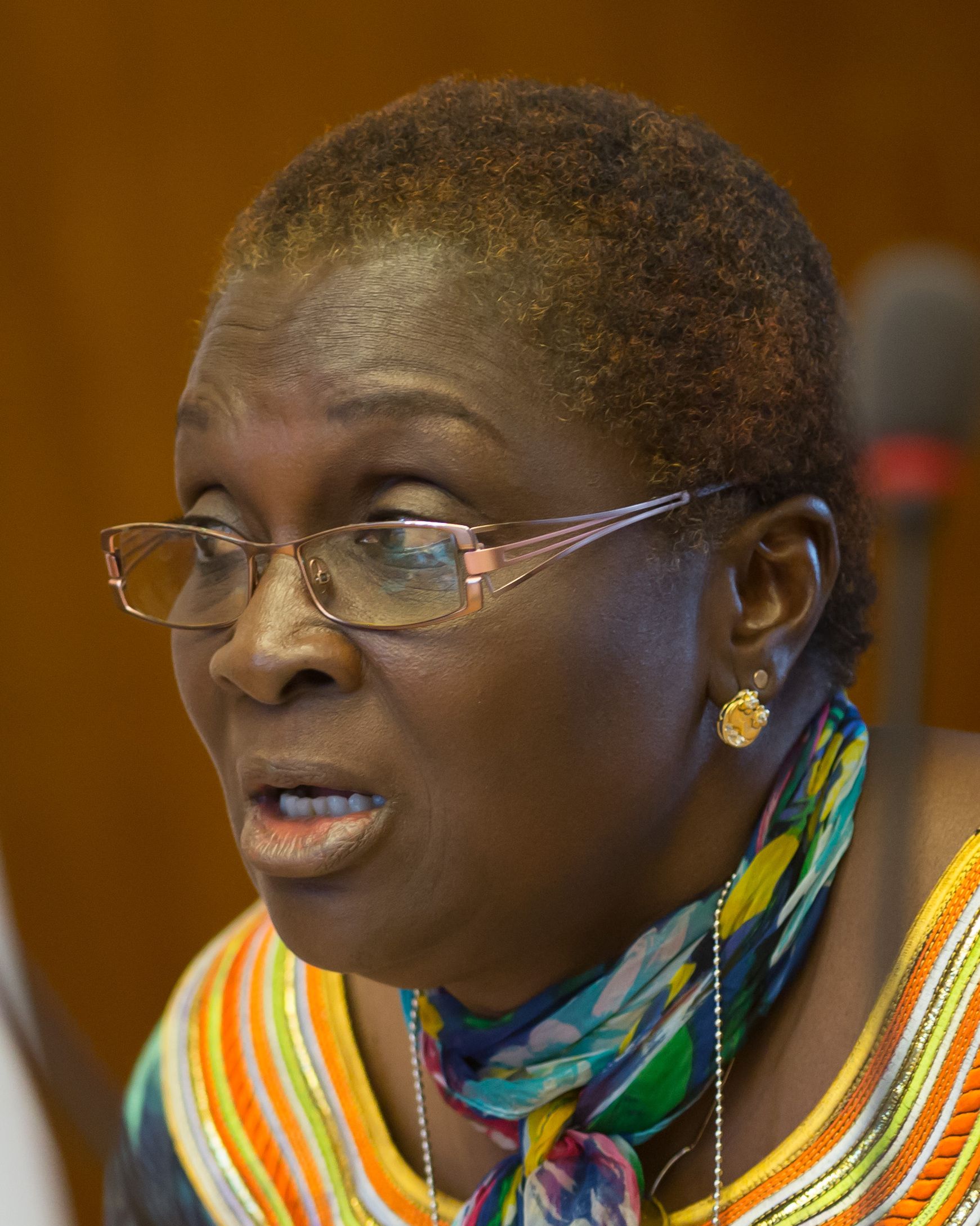
- Alapini-Gansou in 2015

Second Vice-President of the International Criminal Court
- Incumbent
- Assumed office 11 March 2024
- Appointed by: Judges of the ICC
- Preceded by: Antoine Kesia-Mbe Mindua

Judge of the International Criminal Court
- Incumbent
- Assumed office 11 March 2018
- Nominated by: Benin
- Appointed by: Assembly of States Parties

Personal details
- Born: 11 August 1956 (age 70) Abidjan, Ivory Coast
- Occupation: Judge

Reine Adélaïde Sophie Alapini-Gansou (born 11 August 1956) is a Beninese jurist who has been a judge of the International Criminal Court since March 2018.

== Early life and education ==
Alapini-Gansou was born in Abidjan in Ivory Coast on August 11, 1956. She has a degree in Common Law from the University of Lyon in France and a master's degree in Business Law and Judicial lCareers from the National University of Benin. She also has a joint postgraduate degree from the Universities of Maastricht, Lomé and Bhutan.

== Career ==
Alapini-Gansou was admitted to the Benin Bar in 1986. She worked for Avocats Sans Frontières Belgium on the project "Justice for all in Rwanda" in 2001. She has taught General Criminal Law and Criminal Procedure at the University of Abomey-Calavi since 2001 and has authored a number of research papers in human rights and law. She was a member of the Benin Women Lawyers Association and initiated several laws protecting women in Benin.

Alapini-Gansou was an intern for the International Conference of Bars in Paris in 1988 and a trainee of the International Organization for Development Law in Rome from 2000 to 2002. As a member of the Working Group on the Rights of Older Persons and with the African Commission since 2007, she took part in developing a Protocol to the African Charter on Human and Peoples' Rights on the Promotion and Protection of the Rights of Older Persons in Africa, and a Protocol to the African Charter Human and Peoples' Rights on the Rights of Persons with Disabilities in Africa. In 2008, she was a consultant for the World Health Organization for the drafting of a bill to promote and protect the human rights of mentally ill. She has also been a consultant for the International Labor Office on human rights for mentally ill people and people living with HIV in the workplace. She was appointed a member of the United Nations International Mission of Inquiry on electoral violence in the Republic of Côte d'Ivoire from May to June 2011. She was also Head of the Human Rights Component of the Mission African International Support Mali from April 2013 to October 2014. Alapini-Gansou was a member of several United Nations commissions into human rights violations. In 2011, she was appointed as judge at the Permanent Court of Arbitration.

Alapini-Gansou was a member of the African Commission on Human and Peoples' Rights for twelve years, including working as Special Rapporteur from 2005 to 2009 and 2012–2017, and chairing the commission from 2009 until 2012. She trained French-speaking lawyers on proceedings before the International Criminal Court starting 2012. She initiated the referral of human rights violations perpetrated in Libya in 2010 to the African Court of Human Rights and Peoples As Special Rapporteur on Human Rights Defenders in In Africa, she conducted studies on women defenders in Africa and on freedom of association in Africa. In September 2016, she was appointed by the Secretary General of the United Nations as a member of the Commission of Inquiry into Human Rights Violations in Burundi.

Alapini-Gansou was appointed to the International Criminal Court in December 2017, commencing her term on 11 March 2018.

On 13 November 2024, a court in Russia ordered the arrest of Alapini-Gansou. She had previously issued arrest warrants against South Ossetian officials aligned with Russia during the Russo-Georgian War.

== U.S. Sanctions ==
In June 2025, she was among the four ICC judges sanctioned by Trump administration. Her designation pertained to her position on a 3-judge pre-trial panel that issued arrest warrants for Israeli Prime Minister Benjamin Netanyahu and former Defense Minister Yoav Gallant.

== Awards and honours ==
- Laureate of the Prize of Human Rights for the Fiftieth year of African Countries independence by the French Academy of Sciences, Sorbonne, 2010
- 25th Anniversary Award of the African Commission on Human rights for contributions to the service of human rights for Africa, October 2012
- Distinction for contributions to the fight against discrimination based on sexual orientation, UNAIDS, 2014

== Publications ==
- "From article 64 to article 122-1 of the Penal Code: a reform halfway", Annual Review of African Mental Health Assistance "African Realities" 1999 *"Pathological Psychological Aspects of Rape in Africa: The Case of Benin and Congo"
- "Violence against women: the interest of setting up a cell of medico-psycho-legal care", Benin Médical N ° 39 / 40–2008
- "Benin's code of people and family at the test of the application" 2012
- "State responsibility for sexual violence in Africa", 2016;
- "Adoption in Benin, between law and culture", congress on mental health, November 2016
- "The legislator and the African judge in the success of the mission of the Court International Criminal, 2017
