= Rosario Salvatore Aitala =

Italian judge of the International Criminal Court (born 1967)

First Vice-President of the International Criminal Court
- Incumbent
- Assumed office 11 March 2024
- Preceded by: Luz del Carmen Ibáñez Carranza

Judge of the International Criminal Court
- Incumbent
- Assumed office 11 March 2018
- Nominated by: Italy
- Appointed by: Assembly of States Parties

Personal details
- Born: 24 September 1967 (age 59) Catania, Italy
- Education: University of Catania
- Profession: Judge

Rosario Salvatore Aitala (born 1967) is an Italian jurist specialising in criminal law. Aitala was elected as a judge of the International Criminal Court in 2017, for a mandate from 11 March 2018 to 10 March 2027.

== Youth and childhood ==
Aitala was born in Catania in Italy on 24 September 1967.

== Early career ==
Prior to becoming a judge, Aitala was a police officer.

== Judge and prosecutor ==
Aitala was a judge and a prosecutor in Milan, Trapani and Rome for three decades, specialising in criminal law cases involving the Mafia, terrorism, corruption and international crime including terrorism.

=== International Criminal Court judge ===
On 6 December 2017, Aitala was elected as a judge of the International Criminal Court (ICC), with 84 votes in favour by the Assembly of States Parties to the Rome Statute. His term as an ICC judge is from 11 March 2018 to 10 March 2027. He became a judge of Pre-Trial Chamber II in 2018 and was elected as its presiding judge in 2021. In March 2023, Russia initiated a criminal investigation against Aitala, Tomoko Akane and Sergio Gerardo Ugalde Godínez in response to an arrest warrant against President Vladimir Putin for the unlawful deportations of Ukrainian children to Russia during the Russian-Ukrainian war.

In March 2024, judge Aitala became First Vice-President of the Court, after being elected to the position by the plenary of ICC judges.

== Government and international advisor ==
Aitala has been an advisor to Italian foreign ministers and the president of the Italian Senate. In European Union (EU) roles, Aitala has been Coordinator of the Cocaine Route Monitoring and Support Programme of the European Union, and an advisor for EU assistance missions for justice and monitoring money laundering and economic crime.

== Academic career ==
Aitala has carried out research and teaching in criminal law, geopolitics and international relations at LUISS Guido Carli, Università degli Studi della Campania Luigi Vanvitelli (2006–2014), and University of Rome Tor Vergata.
