= Luz del Carmen Ibáñez Carranza =

Peruvian jurist (born 1955)

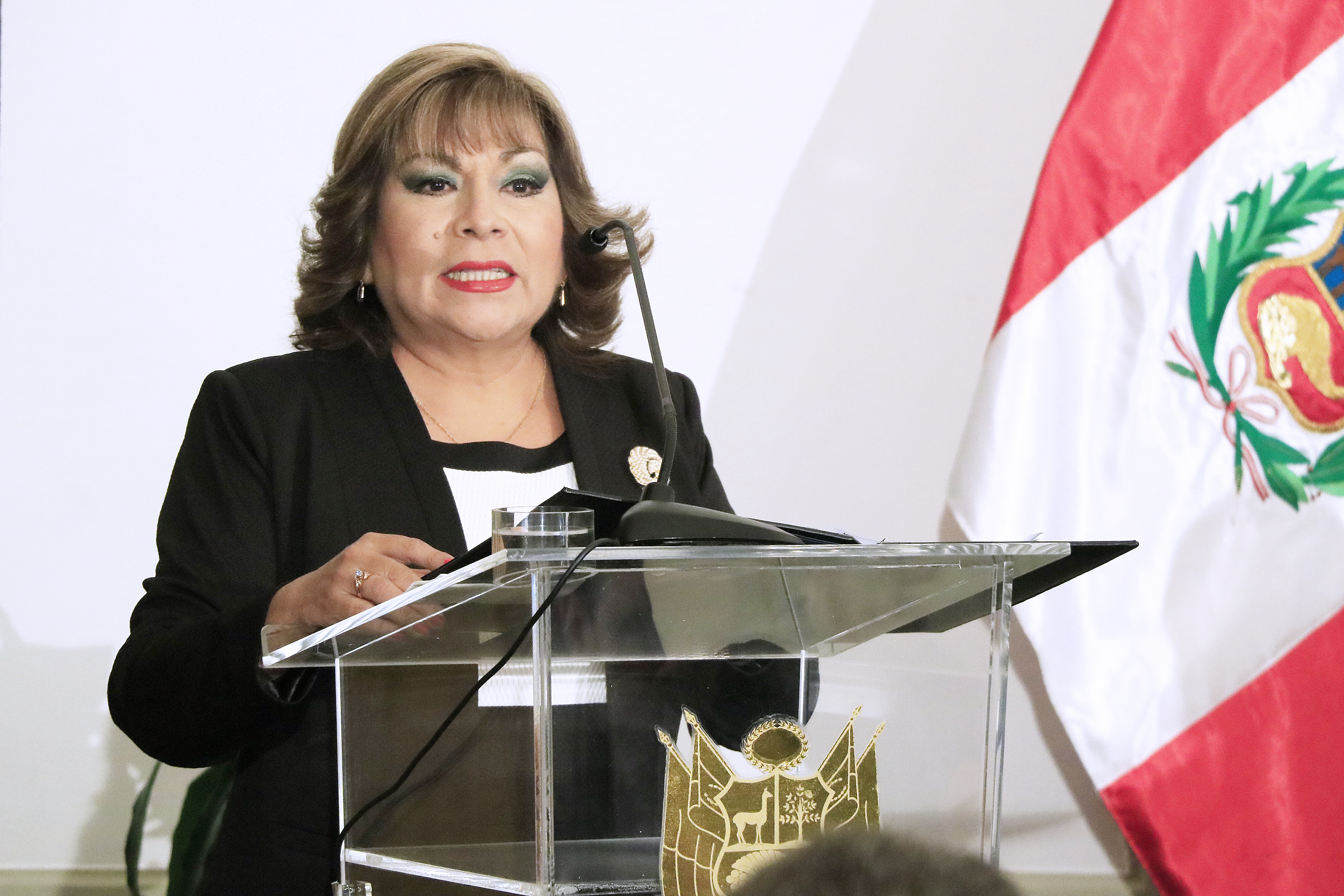
- Luz Ibáñez in 2017

First Vice-President of the International Criminal Court
- In office 11 March 2021 – 10 March 2024
- Appointed by: Judges of the ICC
- Preceded by: Robert Fremr
- Succeeded by: Rosario Salvatore Aitala

Judge of the International Criminal Court
- Incumbent
- Assumed office 11 March 2018
- Nominated by: Peru
- Appointed by: Assembly of States Parties

Personal details
- Born: 15 July 1955 (age 71) Trujillo, Peru

Luz del Carmen Ibáñez Carranza (born 15 July 1955 in Trujillo) is a Peruvian jurist and judge of the International Criminal Court (ICC) in The Hague, Netherlands. Ibañez Carranza is the first Peruvian judge at the ICC. Before being elected as a judge at the ICC, she was a prosecutor and professor in Peru.

== Education ==
In 1974 she began to study law at the National University of Trujillo from where she graduated with a BSc in 1982. Between April 1996 she followed up in her studies at the university Inca Garcilaso de la Vega from where in 1998 she obtained a MSc in Criminal law and in 2007 a Doctorate in law

== Academic career ==
In 1996 she became a lecturer in criminal law at the National University Federico Villareal, a position she kept until 2004. In 2004 she was promoted to Professor at the same university in Lima. Additionally, she is the author of several academic papers and books.

== Juridical career ==
Between 1982 and 1984 she was an assistant prosecutor in Lima. Between 1984 and 1988 she served as a deputy provincial prosecutor and from 1988 to 1989, as the provincial prosecutor for the province of Lima in the 4th provincial prosecutor's office. In 1992 she assumed as the provincial prosecutor for Trujillo, which she stayed until January 1993. Onwards she practiced as a lawyer until 1999. Between 2004 and 2017 she was the chief prosecutor for Lima and the prosecutor at the 2nd National Criminal Court that focused on human rights violations, coming to prominence while prosecuting Abimael Guzmán, the leader of Sendero Luminoso, sentenced to life in prison. Between 2005 and 2007 she was involved in over 500 investigations also of human rights violation during the Peruvian internal armed conflict. Other prominent trials in which she was the prosecutor where El Fronton a case against members of the Peruvian Navy accused of extrajudicial killings on a prison on an island or the one against Victor Polay, the leader of the Túpac Amaru Revolutionary Movement (MRTA).

She was also the delegate representing Peru before the Inter-American Commission of Human Rights (CIDH), the Inter-American Commission against Terrorism (CICTE) and the Convention on the Elimination of All Forms of Discrimination against Women (ACNUDH).

== Judge at the International Criminal Court ==
She was elected to the International Criminal Court in December 2017 and took up the position in 2018. She was assigned to the Appeals chamber of the Court, dealing with cases of Laurent Gbagbo, the ex-President of the Ivory Coast who was acquitted by the ICC and the former Congolese rebel Bosco Ntaganda, sentenced to 30 years imprisonment. In March 2021, she was elected as the First Vice-President of the ICC . She held that position for a fixed term of 3 years until March 2024 when she was succeeded by her Italian colleague, Rosario Salvatore Aitala. In December 2022, she presided over the chamber that confirmed the conviction of Dominic Ongwen, a former leader of the Lord's Resistance Army (LRA) from Uganda to 25 years imprisonment for the crimes of murder, rape and forced pregnancy.

== International Transgressions ==
=== Russia's prosecution ===
In September 2023, Russia issued an arrest warrant for Ibañez Carranza on unspecified charges, in connection with her role as a member of the ICC Presidency.

=== U.S. Sanctions ===
On June 5, 2025, judge Ibañez Carranza was sanctioned alongside her 3 colleagues, including fellow appeals judge Solomy Bossa, for authorizing an ICC-led investigation into the situation in Afghanistan, including into US and NATO personnel, which the US had consistently and vehemently opposed.
