= Raul Pangalangan =

Filipino jurist (born 1958)

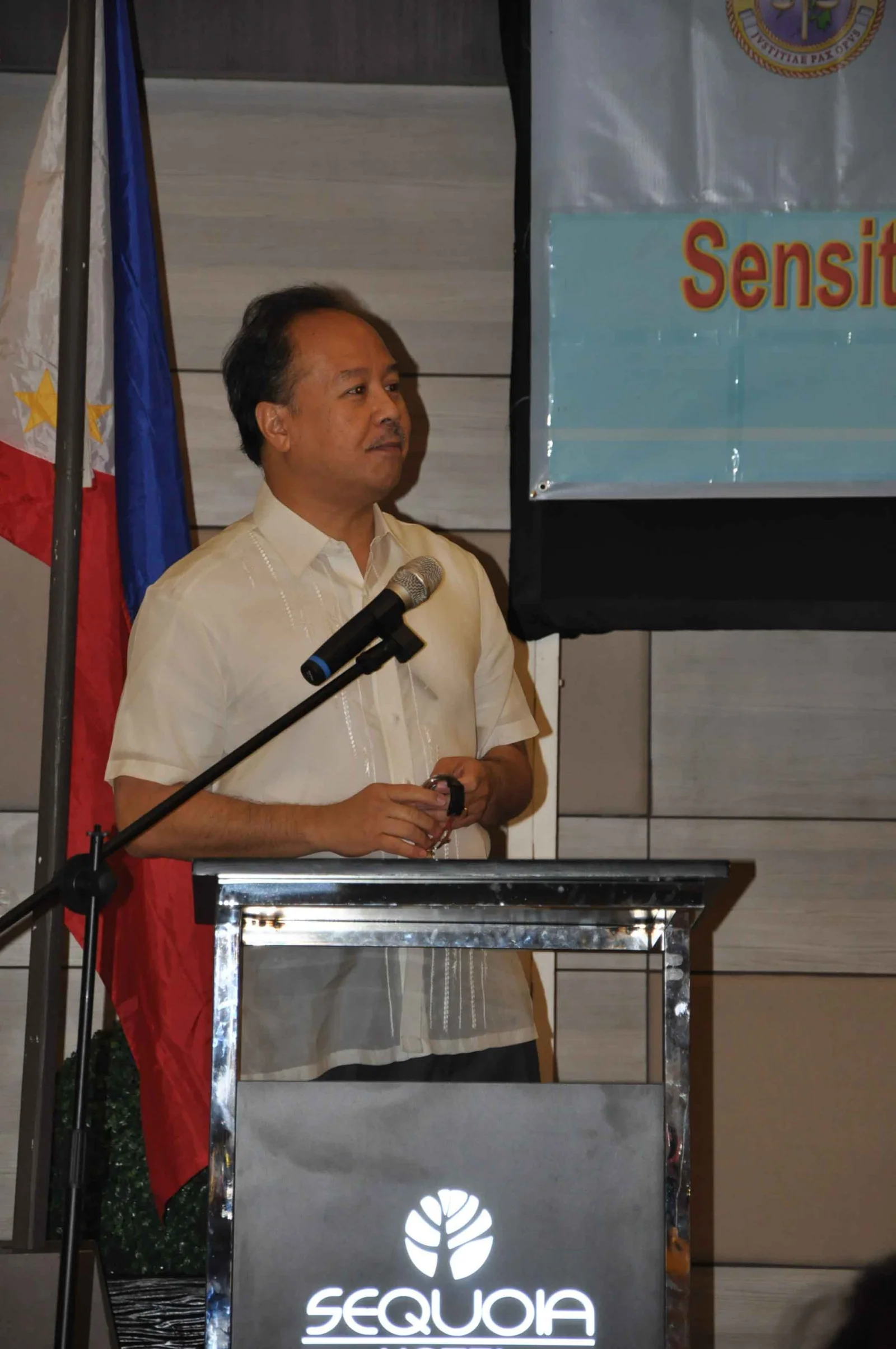
- Pangalangan in 2014

Judge of the International Criminal Court
- In office June 24, 2015 – May 16, 2021
- Nominated by: Philippines
- Appointed by: Assembly of States Parties
- Preceded by: Miriam Defensor Santiago

Dean of the Pamantasan ng Lungsod ng Pasig College of Law
- Incumbent
- Assumed office May 20, 2026
- Preceded by: Office established

Dean of the University of the Philippines College of Law
- In office 1999–2005
- Preceded by: Merlin M. Magallona
- Succeeded by: Salvador T. Carlota

Personal details
- Born: Raul Cano Pangalangan; September 1, 1958 (age 68)
- Spouse: Elizabeth Aguiling
- Education: University of the Philippines Diliman (BA and LLB); Harvard University (LLM and JSD)

Raul Cano Pangalangan (born September 1, 1958) is a Filipino jurist and academic administrator who served as a judge of the International Criminal Court (ICC) from 2015 to 2021. He was elected to the office through a special election called after the resignation of his predecessor, compatriot Miriam Defensor Santiago.

A graduate of the University of the Philippines (UP), Pangalangan pursued postgraduate education at Harvard Law School. In 1999, he was appointed as the dean of UP Law, holding that post until 2005. He then served as publisher of the Philippine Daily Inquirer from 2012 to 2015. Following his tenure as a judge of the ICC, he was appointed as the inaugural dean of the Pamantasan ng Lungsod ng Pasig College of Law in May 2026, and in the same month was named chairman of the Philippine Truth and Reconciliation Commission to investigate the Philippine drug war.

== Early life and education ==
Raul Cano Pangalangan studied political science and law (LLB) at the University of the Philippines and is a member of the UP Alpha Sigma fraternity. He was admitted to the bar in 1984. He then earned his Master of Laws (1986) and Doctor of Juridical Science (1990) degrees from Harvard Law School in the United States.

== Career ==
As a professor of law at the University of the Philippines College of Law (UP Law), Pangalangan specialized in constitutional law and public international law. In 1998, he was a member of the Philippine delegation at the adoption of the Rome Statute that founded the International Criminal Court (ICC). He then served as the dean of UP Law from 1999 to 2005.

From 2012 until his 2015 election to the ICC, Pangalangan was the publisher of the Philippine Daily Inquirer. He has also been appointed as amicus curiae in constitutional law and international law cases before the Supreme Court of the Philippines.

In June 2015, a special election was held by the ICC to fill the vacancy caused by the resignation of one of its judges: Miriam Defensor Santiago, who was the first Filipina to be elected as an ICC judge but never took the bench, resigned in June 2014 due to poor health. Pangalangan, who was nominated by the Philippines, received 59 votes and was elected as the new judge; the other nominee, Ibrahim Aljazy (nominated by Jordan), received 25 votes. Pangalangan was sworn in as a judge on July 13.

Pangalangan was the presiding judge of the chamber that convicted Islamist militant Ahmad al-Faqi al-Mahdi of the war crime of destruction of cultural heritage during the Mali War. Pangalangan was also a judge of the Trial Chamber IX that convicted Lord's Resistance Army commander Dominic Ongwen of 61 counts of war crimes and crimes against humanity. Furthermore, Pangalangan was a judge of the Trial Chamber VII that convicted Jean-Pierre Bemba, a former vice-president of the Democratic Republic of the Congo, of various offences against the administration of justice.

Pangalangan was scheduled to serve out the remainder of Defensor Santiago's term until March 10, 2021. In March 2018, President Rodrigo Duterte announced the Philippines' withdrawal from the Rome Statute after the ICC began a preliminary investigation into the country's war on drugs. The withdrawal would take effect after one year in accordance with the Rome Statute. Despite the withdrawal, the ICC made it clear that Pangalangan will remain as a judge since "the Rome Statute only refers to a requirement of State Party nationality at the time of election but not afterwards." Pangalangan remained in office until May 16, 2021, to finish ongoing proceedings in accordance with paragraph 10, article 36 of the Rome Statute.

On May 21, 2026, the government of Pasig established the Pamantasan ng Lungsod ng Pasig College of Law, with Pangalangan accepting his appointment as the inaugural dean before the university's board of regents a day earlier. Later on May 27, the independent and civilian-led Philippine Truth and Reconciliation Commission (or the EJK Truth Commission) was formally launched, with Pangalangan named as commission chair, to investigate the war on drugs initiated by President Rodrigo Duterte. He stated that the commission's purpose is "to ensure that the stories of victims, survivors, and families are heard, verified, and preserved. This is not about replacing the courts or assigning guilt. It is about building a credible truth record that can guide accountability, healing, reform, and the prevention of future violence."
