= Marc Perrin de Brichambaut =

French judge and diplomat

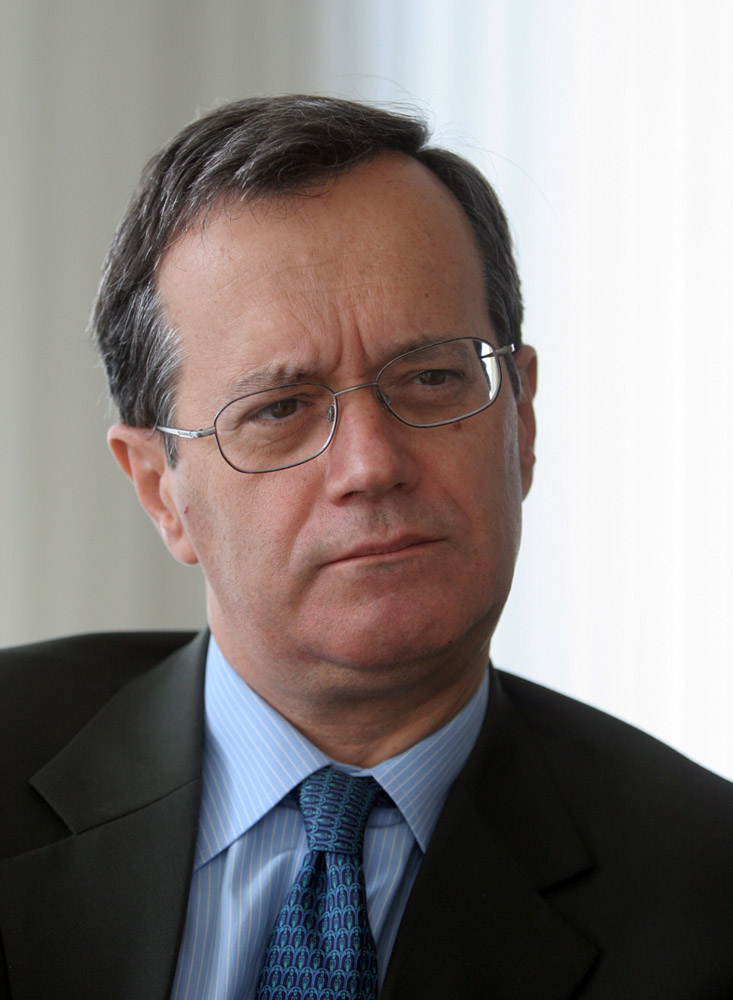

Second Vice-President of the International Criminal Court
- In office 11 March 2018 – 10 March 2021
- Appointed by: Judges of the ICC
- Preceded by: Kuniko Ozaki
- Succeeded by: Antoine Kesia-Mbe Mindua

Judge of the International Criminal Court
- In office 11 March 2015 – 10 March 2024
- Nominated by: France
- Appointed by: Assembly of States Parties

Secretary General of the Organization for Security and Co-operation in Europe
- In office June 2005 – 30 June 2011
- Preceded by: Ján Kubiš
- Succeeded by: Lamberto Zannier

Personal details
- Born: 29 October 1948 (age 77) Rabat, French Morocco

Marc Perrin de Brichambaut (French pronunciation: [maʁk peʁɛ̃ də bʁiʃɑ̃bo]; born 29 October 1948) is a French career judge and diplomat. From 2011 to 2015 he was the Secretary General of the Organization for Security and Co-operation in Europe, and from 2015 to 2024 he was a judge at the International Criminal Court (ICC) in The Hague.

== Early life and education ==
Marc Perrin de Brichambaut was born in Rabat, Morocco in 1948. He graduated from France's École nationale d'administration in Paris in 1974.

== Career ==
De Brichambaut joined the Council of State, France's supreme court for judicial review, in 1974.

In 1983 and 1984, de Brichambaut was chief of staff to Roland Dumas, then Minister of European Affairs, and after Dumas became Minister of Foreign Affairs, de Brichambaut continued to serve as his chief of staff.

In 1986, he moved to Washington, D.C., where he worked as cultural Counsellor for the French Embassy, returning to Paris in 1988 as Principal Adviser to Defense Minister Jean-Pierre Chevenement. He was also adviser to French Foreign Minister Claude Cheysson.

From 1991 to 1994, de Brichambaut was the head of French Delegation at the Conference on Security and Co-operation in Europe (later (OSCE) in Vienna. He was appointed Conseiller d'Etat in 1992.

From 1994 to 1998, de Brichambaut headed the French Foreign Ministry's Legal Division. In that capacity, he led the French delegation to the Rome Conference and signed the Rome Statute of the International Criminal Court on behalf of his country.

Before being appointed as OSCE Secretary General he was Director for Strategic Affairs at the Ministry of the Armed Forces. He served as Secretary General of the OSCE in Vienna from 2005 to 2011.

=== Judge at the International Criminal Court ===
On 10 December 2014 de Brichambaut was elected a judge to the International Criminal Court (ICC) in The Hague. In his capacity as presiding judge of Trial Chamber VII in 2016, he convicted former vice-president of the Democratic Republic of the Congo Jean-Pierre Bemba and four members of his legal team of interfering with witnesses; the verdicts marked the first time the court found suspects guilty of attempting to "pervert the course of justice", a concept from British law parallel to obstruction of justice in American law. As presiding judge of Trial Chamber II, he issued a landmark ruling in 2017 by finding former Congolese militia leader Germain Katanga liable for $1 million in damages to his victims; this was the first time the court awarded damages to individual victims. Shortly after, he also found Thomas Lubanga liable for damages of $10 million to 425 former child soldiers.

In a high-profile decision on South Africa’s failure to arrest and surrender President Omar Al-Bashir of Sudan to the Court while he was on its territory, de Brichambaut issued a separate opinion in 2017, deciding that as signatories to the Genocide Convention both countries were obligated to arrest Bashir.

In March 2018, the ICC judges elected de Brichambaut as Second Vice-President for a three-year term.
