= Sanji Mmasenono Monageng =

Motswana judge

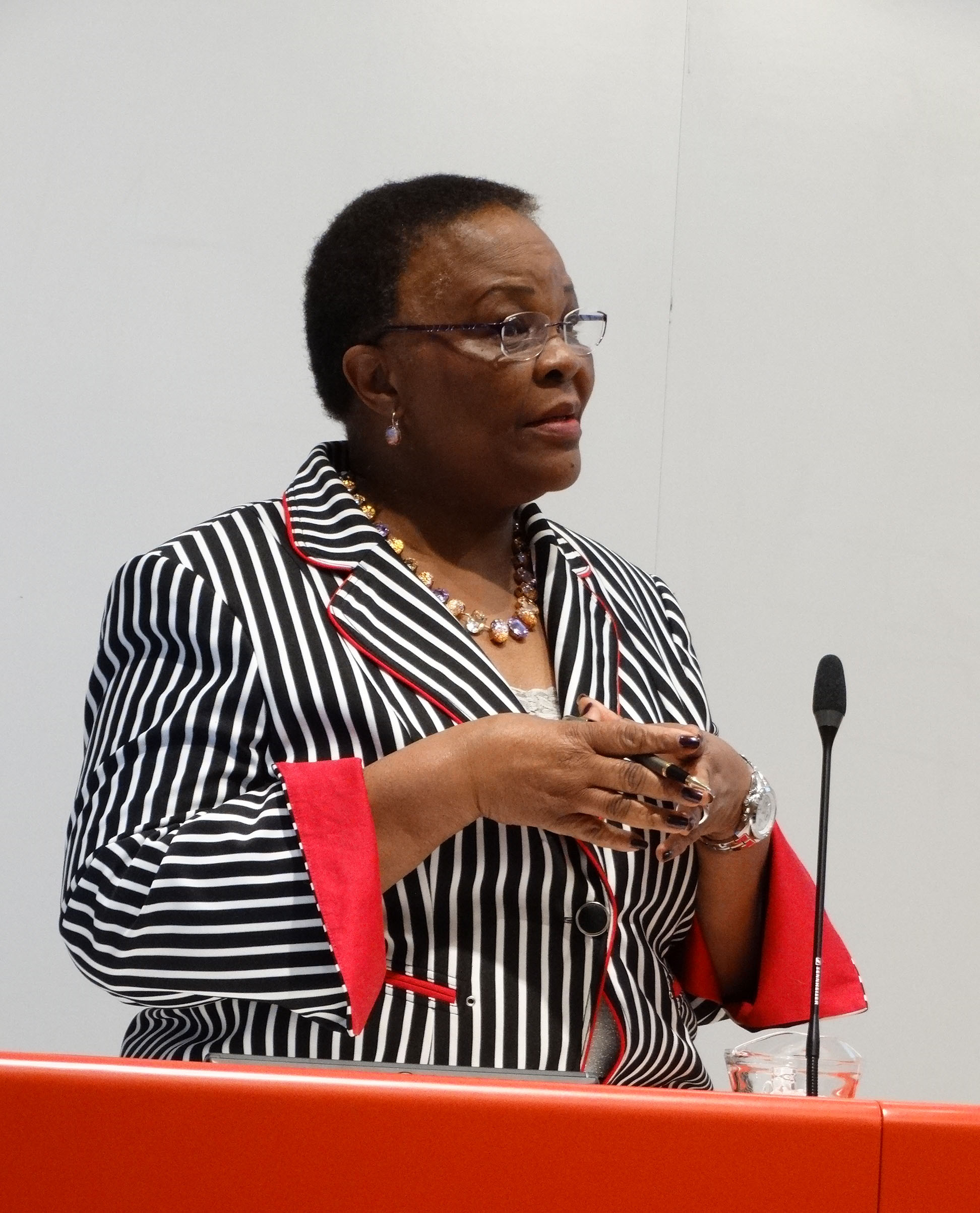
- Monageng in 2015

First Vice-President of the International Criminal Court
- In office 11 March 2012 – 10 March 2015
- Appointed by: Judges of the ICC
- Preceded by: Fatoumata Dembélé Diarra
- Succeeded by: Joyce Aluoch

Judge of the International Criminal Court
- In office 11 March 2009 – 10 March 2018
- Nominated by: Botswana
- Appointed by: Assembly of States Parties

Personal details
- Born: 9 August 1950 (age 76) Botswana
- Education: University of Botswana

Sanji Mmasenono Monageng (born 9 August 1950) is an international lawyer and jurist from Botswana who served as a judge of the International Criminal Court (ICC) from 2009 to 2018.

== Career ==
Monageng is a national of Botswana. She became a judge in Botswana in 1989. In 2003, Monageng was elected as a Commissioner in the African Commission on Human and Peoples' Rights, which is an organ of the African Union. In November 2006, she attended the meeting for The Yogyakarta Principles held in Gadjah Mada University. In 2007 she became the chairperson of the commission.

== International Criminal Court ==
In 2009, Monageng was elected a judge of the ICC by the court's Assembly of States Parties. Her nine-year non-renewable term expires in 2018.

When Monageng was elected to the ICC in 2009, she was assigned to sit in the Pre-Trial Chamber of the Court. Mongaeng remained in the Pre-Trial Chamber until 2012. After serving in the Pre-Trial Chamber, Monageng started working in the Appeals Division in 2012. She was promoted to President of the Appeals Division in 2014.

Between 2012 and 2015, she served as First Vice-president of the Court for a term of three years.

== High Courts ==
At the time she was elected as a judge of the ICC, Monageng was also acting as a judge of the High Court of The Gambia and as a judge of the High Court of Swaziland. She was acting in these positions pursuant to the Commonwealth Fund for Technical Cooperation Programme.

== World Trade Organisation ==
Monageng is a panel member representing Botswana in the Dispute Resolution Board of the World Trade Organisation

== Honors ==
On 30 September 2013, Monageng received the Presidential Order of Honor from President Ian Khama. In 2014, Monageng was given the Human Rights Award by the International Association of Women Judges.
