= Robert Fremr =

Czech jurist

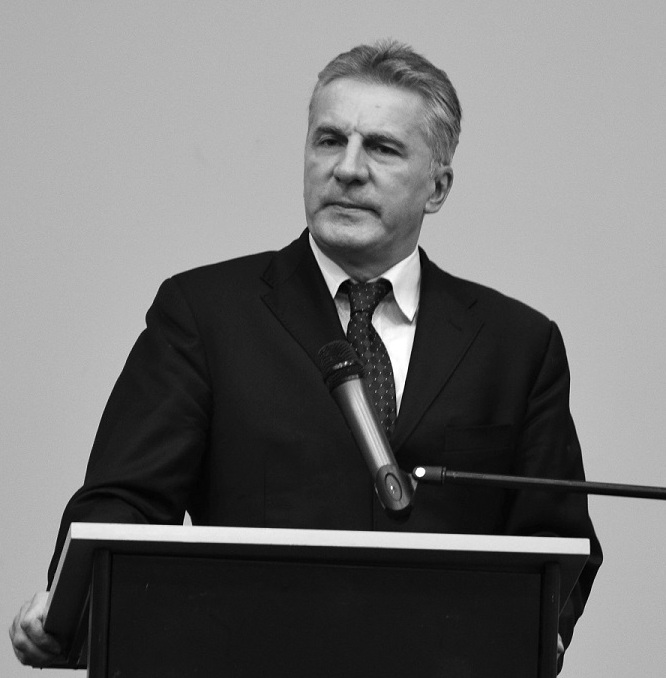
- JUDr. Robert Fremr

First Vice-President of the International Criminal Court
- In office 11 March 2018 – 10 March 2021
- Appointed by: Judges of the ICC
- Preceded by: Joyce Aluoch
- Succeeded by: Luz del Carmen Ibáñez Carranza

Judge of the International Criminal Court
- In office 11 March 2012 – 10 March 2021
- Nominated by: Czech Republic
- Appointed by: Assembly of States Parties

Personal details
- Born: 8 November 1957 (age 68) Prague, Czechoslovakia

Robert Fremr (born 8 November 1957) is a Czech jurist who served as a judge of the International Criminal Court from 2012 to 2021.

== Early life and education ==
From 1976 to 1980, Fremr studied at the Charles University Law School in Prague and earned his Doctor of Laws in 1981.

== Career ==
=== Early career ===
Fremr became a district judge in 1983 and judge of the Court of Appeal in 1986. Eisenhower Fellowships selected Robert Fremr in 1999 to represent the Czech Republic. From 1989 to 2003, he was a judge of the High Court in Prague. From 2004 to 2005 and from 2009 to 2010, he was a Judge of the Supreme Court of the Czech Republic; from 2006 to 2008 and from 2010 to 2011 he was a judge at the International Criminal Tribunal for Rwanda.

=== International Criminal Court, 2011–2021 ===
On 13 December 2011, Fremr was elected a judge of the International Criminal Court in the second ballot. In March 2018, he was elected by his fellow judges to the position of First Vice President of the ICC.

As a trial judge of the ICC, Fremr chaired the proceedings that led to former Congolese military leader Bosco Ntaganda being sentenced in November 2019 to 30 years in prison for atrocities including murder, rape and conscripting child soldiers; the sentence is the longest handed down by the Court to date. In 2021, he was also a judge in the proceedings that resulted in Ntaganda being sentenced to pay child soldiers and other victims a total of $30 million compensation, the Court's highest ever reparation order.
