= Antoine Kesia-Mbe Mindua =

Congolese lawyer and judge (born 1956)

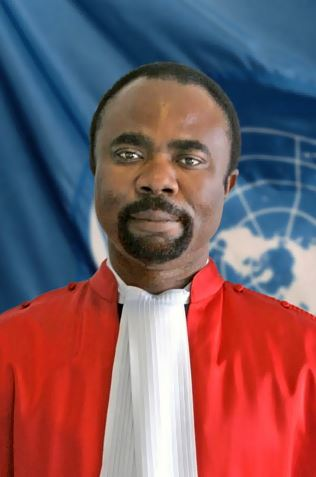

Second Vice-President of the International Criminal Court
- In office 11 March 2021 – 10 March 2024
- Appointed by: Judges of the ICC
- Preceded by: Marc Perrin de Brichambaut
- Succeeded by: Reine Alapini-Gansou

Judge of the International Criminal Court
- In office 11 March 2015 – 10 July 2024
- Nominated by: Democratic Republic of the Congo
- Appointed by: Assembly of States Parties

Judge of the International Criminal Tribunal for the former Yugoslavia
- In office 25 April 2006 – 22 July 2016

Personal details
- Born: 31 December 1956 (age 68) Mushie, Belgian Congo

Antoine Kesia-Mbe Mindua (born 31 December 1956 in Mushie, Belgian Congo) is a Congolese lawyer who served first as a judge of the International Criminal Tribunal for the former Yugoslavia and then as a judge of the International Criminal Court.

== Education ==
Mindua studied law and political science in Kinshasa, Nancy-Université, Strasbourg and Geneva. He received his doctorate in international law from the University of Geneva in 1995.

== Career ==
Mindua served first as a Legal Officer and Chief of the Judicial Proceedings Support Unit at the International Criminal Tribunal for Rwanda in Arusha from 1996 to 2001. He was also ambassador of the Democratic Republic of the Congo to Switzerland in Bern and Permanent Representative to the United Nations Office at Geneva from 2001 to 2006. During his tenure in Geneva, Mindua held a number of multilateral posts, including Vice-Chairman of the Executive Committee of the Programme of the United Nations High Commissioner for Refugees, Chairman of the Group of 77 (G77) and China, and Coordinator of the Group of 21 at the United Nations Conference on Disarmament.

Mindua later served as a Trial Judge at the International Criminal Tribunal for the former Yugoslavia in The Hague from 2006 to 2015.

Within the ICC, Kesia-Mbe chaired the Pre-Trial Division from 2018 until 2019. In 2018, he was assigned to consider the request of prosecutor Fatou Bensouda for the ICC to rule on whether it has jurisdiction over the deportations of Rohingya people from Myanmar to Bangladesh. Also in 2018, he presided over hearings of Alfred Yekatom, a former militia leader accused of alleged atrocities against Muslims in the Central African Republic. In 2020, he was part of the three-member panel who judged that former Congolese vice president and militia leader Jean-Pierre Bemba, who had been acquitted of war crimes by the court in 2018, was not entitled to any damages or compensation for his 10-year stint in the United Nations Detention Unit (UNDU).

== Other activities ==
Mindua is also a professor at the Universities of Kinshasa and Geneva. He teaches public international law and international criminal law.

He is a member of the Crimes Against Humanity Initiative Advisory Council, a project of the Whitney R. Harris World Law Institute at Washington University School of Law in St. Louis to establish the world's first treaty on the prevention and punishment of crimes against humanity.
