= Patrice-Edouard Ngaïssona =

Central African militant

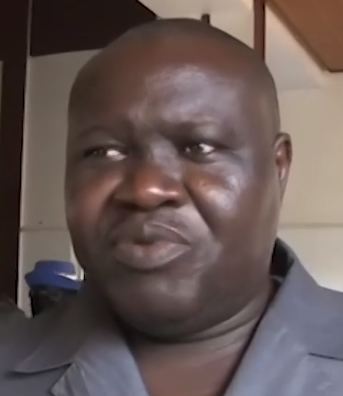

Minister of Sports of the Central African Republic
- In office 2003–2013

Leader of the Anti-Balaka
- In office December 2013 – 12 December 2018
- Succeeded by: Dieudonné Ndomaté

Personal details
- Born: 30 June 1967 (age 59) Begoua, Bangui
- Criminal information
- Convictions: Crimes against humanity; War crimes
- Penalty: 12 years of imprisonment

Details
- Date apprehended: 12 December 2018

Patrice-Edouard Ngaïssona (born 30 June 1967) is a Central African politician and militant who served as the leader of the Anti-Balaka from 2013 to 2018. He formerly served as minister of sports and president of the Central African Football Federation.

He was arrested in 2018 on a warrant by the International Criminal Court for war crimes and crimes against humanity.

== Life ==
Ngaïssona was born on 30 June 1967 in Begoua. He was minister of sport under the Bozizé regime and president of the Central African Football Federation since 2008. In December 2013 he became leader of the Anti-Balaka. In 2015 he distanced himself from Bozizé. In February 2018 he was elected by Executive Committee of the Confederation of African Football to represent the Central African Republic. On 12 December 2018 Ngaïssona was arrested in Paris by French authorities for his involvement in war crimes and crimes against humanity pursuant to an International Criminal Court arrest warrant. On 28 November 2019 he was banned by FIFA from taking part in any football-related activity for six years and eight months. He was also fined 500,000 CHF. His trial started in February 2021.

On 30 August 2021, in The Hague, the hearings in the Central African case of Alfred Yekatom and Ngaïssona resumed after being adjourned in June. A 16th witness, placed on condition of anonymity, was questioned about the attacks in the Bossangoa region during 2013. On 24 July 2025, the ICC convicted Ngaïssona and Yekatom of war crimes and crimes against humanity targeting Muslims during the civil war and sentenced them to 12 and 15 years' imprisonment respectively.
