= Alfred Yekatom =

Central African militant

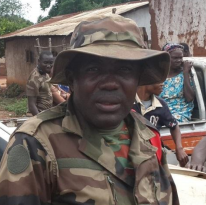
- Alfred Yekatom in Pissa, 2014
- Born: 23 January 1975 (age 51); Bimbo, Central African Republic
- Other names: Rambo

Alfred Yekatom, also known by his alias Rambo, is a former leader of Central African rebel group Anti-balaka, arrested in 2018 for alleged war crimes.

== Life ==
Yekatom was born in 1975 in Bimbo. He is former corporal chief of Central African Armed Forces and member of parliament. Between 5 December 2013 and August 2014 he led around 3,000 Anti-balaka fighters during Central African Republic Civil War. He is allegedly responsible for multiple war crimes including murder, forced displacement, imprisonment, use of child soldiers and more. On 11 November 2018, an arrest warrant was issued against him by the International Criminal Court. He was surrendered to the ICC on 17 November 2018. His trial started on 16 February 2021.

The ICC hearings on Yekatom and Patrice Edouard Ngaïssona resumed on 30 August 2021 after being adjourned in June 2021. A sixteenth witness, testifying anonymously, was questioned about the 2013 attacks in the Bossangoa region. On 24 July 2025, the ICC convicted Ngaïssona and Yekatom of war crimes and crimes against humanity targeting Muslims during the civil war and sentenced them to 12 and 15 years' imprisonment respectively.
