= January 2009 International Criminal Court judges election =

- 19–20 January 2009

6 of 18 seats on the International Criminal Court
- Outgoing judges (Bolivia) René Blattmann (Japan) Fumiko Saiga (Italy) Mauro Politi (South Africa) Navanethem Pillay (Canada) Philippe Kirsch (Cyprus) Gheorghios M. Pikis Elected judges (Guyana) Mohamed Shahabuddeen (Japan) Fumiko Saiga (Italy) Cuno Tarfusser (Botswana) Sanji Mmasenono Monageng (Belgium) Christine van den Wyngaert (Kenya) Joyce Aluoch

An ordinary election for six judges of the International Criminal Court was held during the resumption of the 7th session of the Assembly of States Parties to the Rome Statute of the International Criminal Court in New York on 19 and 20 January 2009.

The election was to fill six seats for which the original judges had been elected to six-year terms in the initial election in 2003. The newly elected judges were to serve nine-year terms.

== Background ==
The judges elected in this election were to take office on 11 March 2009, and to remain in office until 10 March 2018.

The election was governed by the Rome Statute of the International Criminal Court. Its article 36(8)(a) states that "[t]he States Parties shall, in the selection of judges, take into account the need, within the membership of the Court, for:

- (i) The representation of the principal legal systems of the world;
- (ii) Equitable geographical representation; and
- (iii) A fair representation of female and male judges."

Furthermore, article 36(3)(b) and 36(5) provide for two lists:

- List A contains those judges that "[h]ave established competence in criminal law and procedure, and the necessary relevant experience, whether as judge, prosecutor, advocate or in other similar capacity, in criminal proceedings";
- List B contains those who "[h]ave established competence in relevant areas of international law such as international humanitarian law and the law of human rights, and extensive experience in a professional legal capacity which is of relevance to the judicial work of the Court".

Each candidate must belong to exactly one list.

Further rules of election were adopted by a resolution of the Assembly of States Parties in 2004.

== Judges remaining in office ==
The following judges were scheduled to remain in office beyond 2009:

Judge	Nationality	List A or B		Regional criteria					Gender	
Judge	Nationality	List A	List B	African	Asian	E. European	GRULAC	WEOG	Female	Male
Bruno Cotte	France	X						X		X
Adrian Fulford	United Kingdom	X						X		X
Hans-Peter Kaul	Germany		X					X		X
Erkki Kourula	Finland		X					X		X
Fatoumata Dembélé Diarra	Mali	X		X					X	
Akua Kuenyehia	Ghana		X	X					X	
Daniel David Ntanda Nsereko	Uganda	X		X						X
Elizabeth Odio Benito	Costa Rica	X					X		X	
Sylvia Helena de Figueiredo Steiner	Brazil	X					X		X	
Sang-hyun Song	South Korea	X			X					X
Ekaterina Trendafilova	Bulgaria	X				X			X	
Anita Ušacka	Latvia		X			X			X	
		8	4	3	1	2	2	4	6	6

== Nomination process ==
The nomination period of judges for the 2009 election was scheduled to last from 21 July to 13 October 2008. It was extended three times, to 27 October, 10 November and 24 November 2008, because the minimum nomination requirements of two candidates each from the Asian States and the Latin American and Caribbean States had not been met. The following persons were nominated:

Name	Nationality	List A or B		Regional criteria					Gender	
Name	Nationality	List A	List B	African	Asian	E. European	GRULAC	WEOG	Female	Male
Victoire Désirée Adétoro Agbanrin-Elisha	Benin	X		X					X	
Joyce Aluoch	Kenya	X		X					X	
Phani Dascalopoulou-Livada	Greece		X					X	X	
Christopher John Robert Dugard	South Africa		X	X						X
Chile Eboe-Osuji	Nigeria	X		X						X
María del Carmen González Cabal	Ecuador		X				X		X	
Gberdao Gustave Kam	Burkina Faso	X		X						X
Sanji Mmasenono Monageng	Botswana		X	X					X	
Aminatta Lois Runeni N'Gum	Gambia		X	X					X	
Vonimbolana Rasoazanany	Madagascar	X		X					X	
Fumiko Saiga	Japan		X		X				X	
Mohamed Shahabuddeen	Guyana		X				X			X
Angélique Sita-Akele Muila	Democratic Republic of the Congo		X	X					X	
El Hadji Malick Sow	Senegal	X		X						X
Cuno Tarfusser	Italy	X						X		X
Wilhelmina Thomassen	Netherlands	X						X	X	
Rosolu John Bankole Thompson	Sierra Leone	X		X						X
Christine van den Wyngaert	Belgium	X						X	X	
Dragomir Vukoje	Bosnia and Herzegovina	X				X				X
		11	8	11	1	1	2	4	11	8

The candidatures of Fernando Enrique Arboleda Ripoll of Colombia and of Lombe Chibesakunda of Zambia were withdrawn on 13 and 16 January 2009, respectively.

The candidature of Onesmus Mutungi of Kenya was replaced by the candidature of Joyce Aluoch on 13 October 2008.

Chile Eboe-Osuji of Nigeria was transferred from List B to List A on 10 November 2008.

== Minimum voting requirements ==
Minimum voting requirements governed part of the election. This was to ensure that article 36(8)(a) cited above is fulfilled. For this election, the following initial minimum voting requirements applied.

Regarding the List A or B requirement, there was a minimum voting requirement (not to be waived) of one judge from List A and one judge from List B.

Regarding the regional criteria, there was a voting requirement for one judge from the Asian States and one judge from the Latin American and Caribbean States.

Regarding the gender criteria, there was no minimum voting requirement.

The regional and gender criteria are adjusted even before the election depending on the number of candidates. Paragraph 20(b) of the 2004 resolution states that if there are fewer than double the number of candidates required for each region, the minimum voting requirement shall be half the number of candidates, rounded up; except when there is only one candidate, which results in no voting requirement. Furthermore, if the number of candidates of one gender is less than ten, then the minimum voting requirement shall not exceed a certain number depending on the number of candidates.

The regional and gender criteria are dropped either if they can on longer be (jointly) fulfilled, or if after four ballots not all seats have been filled.

The voting requirements were as follows:

Criterion	Number of judges required	Number of judges remaining in office	Ex ante voting requirement	Candidates	Adjusted voting requirement	Adjusted requirement equals ex ante?
Lists A or B
List A	9	8	1	11	1	Yes
List B	5	4	1	8	1	Yes
Regional criteria
African states	3	3	0	11	0	Yes
Asian states	2	1	1	1	0	No
Eastern European states	2	2	0	1	0	Yes
Latin American and Caribbean States	3	2	1	2	1	Yes
Western European and other States	3	4	0	4	0	Yes
Gender criteria
Female	6	6	0	11	0	Yes
Male	6	6	0	8	0	Yes

Because Fumiko Saiga was the only Asian candidate, the corresponding regional requirement was adjusted to zero. The requirement to vote for one candidate from the Latin American and Caribbean States remained in force, as two candidates from that region remained after the withdrawal of Fernando Enrique Arboleda Ripoll.

== Ballots ==
The first two ballots took place on 19 January 2009. All other ballots took place on 20 January 2009. The voting totals were as follows:

Name	Nationality	List A or B	Region	Gender	1st round	2nd round	3rd round	4th round	5th round	6th round	7th round	8th round	9th round
Number of States Parties voting					108	108	108	107	108	105	108	108	100
Two-thirds majority					72	72	72	72	72	72	72	72	67
Mohamed Shahabuddeen	Guyana	List B	Latin American and Caribbean States	Male	79	elected							
Fumiko Saiga	Japan	List B	Asian States	Female	72	elected							
Cuno Tarfusser	Italy	List A	Western European and Other States	Male	69	68	74	elected					
Sanji Mmasenono Monageng	Botswana	List B	African States	Female	41	50	64	75	elected				
Christine van den Wyngaert	Belgium	List A	Western European and Other States	Female	58	58	61	67	73	elected			
Joyce Aluoch	Kenya	List A	African States	Female	30	32	39	36	38	48	55	62	100
Wilhelmina Thomassen	Netherlands	List A	Western European and Other States	Female	59	62	62	60	65	56	53	46	withdrawn
Phani Dascalopoulou-Livada	Greece	List B	Western European and Other States	Female	48	43	31	28	14	withdrawn			
Christopher John Robert Dugard	South Africa	List B	African States	Male	30	27	25	20	14	withdrawn			
María del Carmen González Cabal	Ecuador	List B	Latin American and Caribbean States	Female	31	18	18	14	withdrawn				
Chile Eboe-Osuji	Nigeria	List A	African States	Male	24	16	12	withdrawn					
Vonimbolana Rasoazanany	Madagascar	List A	African States	Female	10	6	12	withdrawn					
Gberdao Gustave Kam	Burkina Faso	List A	African States	Male	14	9	withdrawn						
Angélique Sita-Akele Muila	Democratic Republic of the Congo	List B	African States	Female	11	4	withdrawn						
El Hadji Malick Sow	Senegal	List A	African States	Male	10	4	withdrawn						
Dragomir Vukoje	Bosnia and Herzegovina	List A	Eastern European States	Male	9	4	withdrawn						
Aminatta Lois Runeni N'Gum	Gambia	List B	African States	Female	5	3	withdrawn						
Rosolu John Bankole Thompson	Sierra Leone	List A	African States	Male	9	2	withdrawn						
Victoire Désirée Adétoro Agbanrin-Elisha	Benin	List A	African States	Female	4	withdrawn							

The minimum voting requirements are imposed on the ballots cast, not on the results. Thus, there is no guarantee that a corresponding number of judges is elected. However, in this election this was the case:

Criterion	Initial minimal voting requirement	Corresponding number of judges elected?
List A	1	Yes, after 3rd ballot
List B	1	Yes, after 1st ballot
Asian	1	Yes, after 1st ballot
Latin American and Caribbean	1	Yes, after 1st ballot

Note that the minimum voting requirement for an Asian candidate had been adjusted to zero before the election and was thus not being imposed when Saiga was elected in the first ballot.

Shahabuddeen subsequently resigned before taking office, while Saiga died on 24 April 2009. Their seats were filled in the November 2009 special election.
