= 2006 International Criminal Court judges election =

Election for judges of ICC

- 26 January 2006

6 of 18 seats on the International Criminal Court
- Outgoing judges (Samoa) Tuiloma Neroni Slade (Latvia) Anita Ušacka (Finland) Erkki Kourula (Ghana) Akua Kuenyehia (South Korea) Sang-hyun Song (Germany) Hans-Peter Kaul Elected judges (Bulgaria) Ekaterina Trendafilova (Latvia) Anita Ušacka (Finland) Erkki Kourula (Ghana) Akua Kuenyehia (South Korea) Sang-hyun Song (Germany) Hans-Peter Kaul

An ordinary election for six judges of the International Criminal Court was held during the resumption of the 4th session of the Assembly of States Parties to the Rome Statute of the International Criminal Court in New York on 26 January 2006.

== Background ==
The judges elected at this election were to take office on 11 March 2006. All six judges elected for a three-year term in 2003 were eligible for re-election, and all of them ran.

The election was governed by the Rome Statute of the International Criminal Court. Its article 36(8)(a) states that "[t]he States Parties shall, in the selection of judges, take into account the need, within the membership of the Court, for:

- (i) The representation of the principal legal systems of the world;
- (ii) Equitable geographical representation; and
- (iii) A fair representation of female and male judges."

Furthermore, article 36(3)(b) and 36(5) provide for two lists:

- List A contains those judges that "[h]ave established competence in criminal law and procedure, and the necessary relevant experience, whether as judge, prosecutor, advocate or in other similar capacity, in criminal proceedings";
- List B contains those who "[h]ave established competence in relevant areas of international law such as international humanitarian law and the law of human rights, and extensive experience in a professional legal capacity which is of relevance to the judicial work of the Court".

Each candidate must belong to exactly one list.

Further rules of election were adopted by a resolution of the Assembly of States Parties in 2004.

== Judges remaining in office ==
The following judges were scheduled to remain in office beyond 2006:

Judge	Nationality	List A or B		Regional criteria					Gender	
Judge	Nationality	List A	List B	African	Asian	E. European	GRULAC	WEOG	Female	Male
Maureen Harding Clark	Ireland	X						X	X	
Adrian Fulford	United Kingdom	X						X		X
Claude Jorda	France	X						X		X
Philippe Kirsch	Canada		X					X		X
Mauro Politi	Italy		X					X		X
Fatoumata Dembélé Diarra	Mali	X		X					X	
Navanethem Pillay	South Africa		X	X					X	
René Blattmann	Bolivia		X				X			X
Karl Hudson-Phillips	Trinidad and Tobago	X					X			X
Elizabeth Odio Benito	Costa Rica	X					X		X	
Sylvia Helena de Figueiredo Steiner	Brazil	X					X		X	
Georghios M. Pikis	Cyprus	X			X					X
		8	4	2	1	0	4	5	5	7

== Nomination process ==
The nomination period of judges for the 2006 election was scheduled to last from 18 July to 9 October 2005. It was extended three times, to 23 October, 6 November and 20 November 2005, because the required number of four Eastern European candidates had not been nominated. The final extension also did not result in this requirement being fulfilled. The following persons were nominated:

Name	Nationality	List A or B		Regional criteria					Gender	
Name	Nationality	List A	List B	African	Asian	E. European	GRULAC	WEOG	Female	Male
Károly Bárd	Hungary		X			X				X
Haridiata Dakouré	Burkina Faso	X		X					X	
Hans-Peter Kaul	Germany		X					X		X
Erkki Kourula	Finland		X					X		X
Akua Kuenyehia	Ghana		X	X					X	
Tuiloma Neroni Slade	Samoa	X			X					X
Sang-hyun Song	South Korea	X			X					X
Cheikh Tidiane Thiam	Senegal		X	X						X
Ekaterina Trendafilova	Bulgaria	X				X			X	
Anita Ušacka	Latvia		X			X			X	
		4	6	3	2	3	0	2	4	6

The candidature of Effie Owuor of Kenya, which had been submitted on 18 October 2005, was withdrawn on 16 November 2005.

== Minimum voting requirements ==
Minimum voting requirements governed part of the election. This was to ensure that articles 36(5) and 36(8)(a) cited above were fulfilled. For this election, the following minimum voting requirements applied initially.

Regarding the List A or B requirement, there was a minimum voting requirement for one judge from List A and one judge from List B.

Regarding the regional criteria, there were minimum voting requirements for one African, one Asian and two Eastern European judges.

Regarding the gender criteria, there was a minimum voting requirement for one female judge.

The regional and gender requirements could have been adjusted before the election depending on the number of candidates, pursuant to paragraphs 20 (b) and (c) of the 2004 resolution.

The minimum voting requirements are updated after each ballot to account for the judges already elected. The regional and gender requirements are dropped either if they can no longer be (jointly) fulfilled, or if after four ballots not all seats are filled. The List A or B requirement remains active until a sufficient number of judges has been elected from each list.

The voting requirements were as follows:

Criterion	Number of judges required	Number of judges remaining in office	Ex ante voting requirement	Number of candidates	Adjusted voting requirement	Adjusted requirement equals ex ante?
Lists A or B
List A	9	8	1	4	1	Yes
List B	5	4	1	6	1	Yes
Regional criteria
African states	3	2	1	3	1	Yes
Asian states	2	1	1	2	1	Yes
Eastern European states	2	0	2	3	2	Yes
Latin American and Caribbean States	3	4	0	0	0	Yes
Western European and other States	3	5	0	2	0	Yes
Gender criteria
Female	6	5	1	4	1	Yes
Male	6	7	0	6	0	Yes

== Ballots ==
The only ballot took place on 26 January 2006. The results were as follows:

Name	Nationality	List A or B	Region	Gender	Ballot
Number of States Parties voting					100
Two-thirds majority					67
Ekaterina Trendafilova	Bulgaria	List A	Eastern European States	Female	82
Anita Ušacka	Latvia	List B	Eastern European States	Female	77
Erkki Kourula	Finland	List B	Western European and Other States	Male	73
Akua Kuenyehia	Ghana	List B	African States	Female	72
Sang-hyun Song	South Korea	List A	Asian States	Male	70
Hans-Peter Kaul	Germany	List B	Western European and Other States	Male	67
Tuiloma Neroni Slade	Samoa	List A	Asian States	Male	50
Károly Bárd	Hungary	List B	Eastern European States	Male	36
Cheikh Tidiane Thiam	Senegal	List B	African States	Male	29
Haridiata Dakouré	Burkina Faso	List A	African States	Female	16

The minimum voting requirements are imposed on the ballots cast, not on the results. Thus, there is no guarantee that a corresponding number of judges is elected. However, in this election this was the case already after a single ballot.

With the exception of Judge Slade (who was replaced by Ekaterina Trendafilova) all re-eligible judges were in fact re-elected.
