= Cuno Tarfusser =

Italian judge (born 1954)

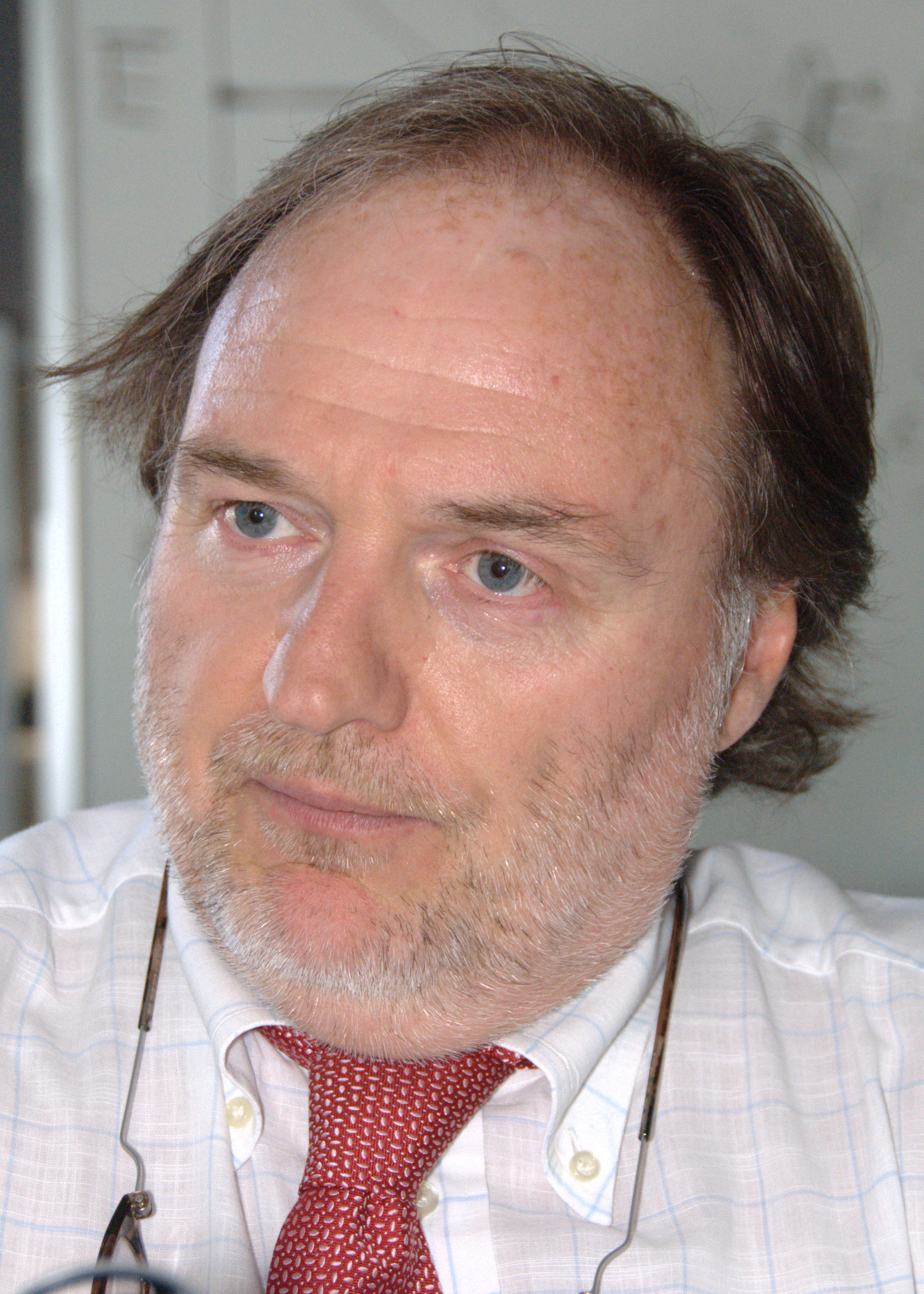

Second Vice-President of the International Criminal Court
- In office 11 March 2012 – 10 March 2015
- Appointed by: Judges of the ICC
- Preceded by: Hans-Peter Kaul
- Succeeded by: Kuniko Ozaki

Judge of International Criminal Court
- In office 11 March 2009 – 10 March 2018
- Nominated by: Italy
- Appointed by: Assembly of States Parties

Personal details
- Born: 11 August 1954 (age 72) Merano, South Tyrol, Italy
- Education: University of Innsbruck; University of Padua
- Profession: Prosecutor

Cuno Jakob Tarfusser (born 11 August 1954) is an Italian former judge of the International Criminal Court (ICC).

== Education and early career ==
Tarfusser studied at the University of Innsbruck and the University of Padova. Prior to his appointment to the ICC, he had an extensive legal career in Italy as a prosecutor, including holding the office of Chief Public Prosecutor.

== Judge of the International Criminal Court, 2009–2018 ==
Tarfusser took office at the ICC on 11 March 2009 He was assigned to Pre-Trial Chamber II at the International Criminal Court.

Together with judges Hans-Peter Kaul and Ekaterina Trendafilova, Tarfusser made the landmark decision that saw Kenyan President Uhuru Kenyatta, his Deputy William Ruto, former Head of Civil Service Francis Muthaura and journalist Joshua Sang committed to trial in January 2012.

In October 2013, Tarfusser issued an arrest warrant for Kenyan journalist Walter Barasa on suspicion of attempting to bribe a potential witness in the International Criminal Court investigation in Kenya against Ruto; this was the first time the court sought to prosecute someone over interfering with its legal process.

In February 2015, Tarfusser and Trendafilova dissented with their colleagues of the Pre-Trial Chamber II in their decision to uphold the acquittal of militia leader Mathieu Ngudjolo Chui of commanding fighters who destroyed the village of Bogoro in eastern Congo in 2003, raping and hacking to death some 200 people including children. The original 2012 judgment had been only the second verdict in the court's history and the first time it had cleared a suspect. Both Tarfusser and Trendafilova argued that the appeals chamber should have ordered a retrial because of errors by the trial panel, saying that "vital evidence was disregarded."

In March 2015, Tarfusser unsuccessfully ran for the office of President of the International Criminal Court; he ended up losing to Silvia Fernández de Gurmendi by one vote.

Also in March 2015, the Pre-Trial Chamber designated Tarfusser to replace Trendiflova in proceeding with the trial of Dominic Ongwen as a single judge. As presiding judge of the Pre Trial Chamber II, Tarfusser was also put in charge of the case against LRA leaders Joseph Kony, Vincent Otti and Okot Odhiambo. Soon after, he issued the order to terminate proceedings against Odhiambo following the release of a forensic report confirming that Odhiambo was killed in the Central African Republic.

In a 2015 majority decision of the Pre-Trial Chamber I, Tarfusser joined his fellow judge Joyce Aluoch – with Judge Péter Kovács dissenting – in requesting ICC Prosecutor Fatou Bensouda to reconsider her decision not to investigate the Gaza flotilla raid of 31 May 2010.

After September 2015, Tarfusser served as presiding judge in the case of Ahmad al-Faqi, the first individual to face charges of the war crime of damaging mankind's cultural heritage at the court.
