= Chris van den Wyngaert =

Belgian judge (born 1952)

Baroness Christine Van Den Wyngaert

Judge of the International Criminal Court
- In office 11 March 2009 – 10 March 2018
- Nominated by: Belgium
- Appointed by: Assembly of States Parties

Judge of the International Criminal Tribunal for the former Yugoslavia
- In office 15 December 2003 – 31 August 2009

Personal details
- Born: 2 April 1952 (age 74) Antwerp, Belgium
- Education: Vrije Universiteit Brussel
- Profession: Teaching, Jurist, Judge, Lawyer

Christine, Baroness Van den Wyngaert (born 2 April 1952) is a Belgian jurist and judge. She served as international and comparative criminal law expert from 2009 to 2018 as a judge on the International Criminal Court. She served in the Trial Division Chamber. On 8 July 2013, Van den Wyngaert was ennobled by King Albert II of Belgium as a baroness for her services as a judge. From 2003 to 2005 she was a Judge at the International Criminal Tribunal for the former Yugoslavia, and from 2000 to 2002 an ad hoc judge on the International Court of Justice.

== Career ==
=== Early career ===
She received a law degree from Vrije Universiteit Brussel, Belgium in 1974. During the 1970s, she had alternative career as singer-songwriter, performing (among others) with Ferre Grignard and Wannes Van de Velde, and resulting in a Long Play recording;

In 1979, she received her PhD in law from the University of Brussels, Belgium; her PhD thesis was subsequently awarded with the Henri Rolin-prize.

In 1985, she began teaching criminal law at the University of Antwerp. She was Visiting Fellow of the Centre for European Legal Studies (1994–1996) and of the Research Centre for International Law (1996–1997) at the University of Cambridge.

In 2001, she was Visiting professor at the University of Stellenbosch and from 2000–2002 she was an Ad hoc Judge at the International Court of Justice in the Yerodia case.

=== Judge at the International Criminal Tribunal for the former Yugoslavia, 2003–2009 ===
From 2003 to 2005, she was Ad litem Judge at the International Criminal Tribunal for the former Yugoslavia;

From 17 November 2005 until 2009 she was a permanent Judge. at the International Criminal Tribunal for the Former Yugoslavia.

=== Judge of the International Criminal Court, 2009–2018 ===
In March 2012, the Presidency of the ICC announced that Van Den Wyngaert and her fellow judges Kuniko Ozaki and Chile Eboe-Osuji would form Trial Chamber V, which was responsible for the prosecutor's investigation in Kenya. By April 2013, Van Den Wyngaert asked to be excused from hearing a crimes-against-humanity case against Uhuru Kenyatta and William Ruto after questioning the conduct of the prosecution under Fatou Bensouda.

When Congolese warlord Germain Katanga was convicted in March 2014 of being an accessory to one count of crime against humanity and war crimes including murder and pillage – only the second conviction in the 12-year history of the ICC –, Van den Wyngaert partially disagreed with her two fellow judges Fatoumata Dembele Diarra and Bruno Cotte. In her dissenting opinion, she argued Katanga's trial had lasted too long and that he should have been acquitted in 2013 along with his co-accused Mathieu Ngudjolo. She also held that Katanga was not intentionally responsible for the crimes and said it was unfair to convict him as an accessory when he had originally been charged with being central to the crimes' commission.

In June 2014 she wrote a dissenting opinion during the pre-trial of the case The Prosecutor v. Laurent Gbagbo and Charles Blé Goudé, holding she was unable to join her colleagues in their decision to confirm the charges against Laurent Gbagbo and that in her view that the evidence was still insufficient.

== Other activities ==
Van den Wyngaert is on the steering committee for The Crimes Against Humanity Initiative, which was launched in 2008 to study the need for a new comprehensive global convention on the prevention and punishment of crimes against humanity.

She has also served as rapporteur for the International Law Association on extradition and human rights and a general reporter for the Association Internationale de Droit Pénal in Budapest relating to international cooperation to combat organized crime.

== Recognition ==
- 2001: doctor honoris causa at the University of Uppsala;
- 2006: Human Rights prize from Liga voor Mensenrechten.
- 2009: doctor honoris causa at the University of Brussels (2009).

== Bibliography ==
A list of publications by Van Den Wyngaert up to 2004 is enclosed in CV Judge Van den Wijngaert at the Foreign Affairs Belgium website.

=== As author ===
- Van Den Wyngaert, C. Political Offence Exception to Extradition: The Delicate Problem of Balancing the Rights of the Individual and the International Public Order. Kluwer Academic, 1980, ISBN 90-268-1185-3.
- (In Dutch:) Van Den Wyngaert, C. Strafrecht en strafprocesrecht in hoofdlijnen. 1991. 11th revised edition: Strafrecht en strafprocesrecht in hoofdlijnen. Gompel&Svacina, 2019, ISBN 978 94 6371 154 8.

=== As (co-)editor ===
- Van Den Wyngaert, C. et al. Criminal procedure systems in the European Community. Butterworths, 1993, ISBN 0-406-02276-3.
- Van Den Wyngaert, C. et al. International Criminal Law and Procedure. Dartmouth - Ashgate, 1996, ISBN 1-85521-835-6.
- Van Den Wyngaert, C. et al. International Criminal Law: A Collection of International and European Instruments. Brill Academic Publishers,
  - 1996, ISBN 90-411-0303-1 (description at Alibris);
  - 2000, ISBN 90-411-1443-2;
  - 2005, ISBN 90-04-14294-0.
