= Silvia Fernández de Gurmendi =

Argentine lawyer, diplomat and judge

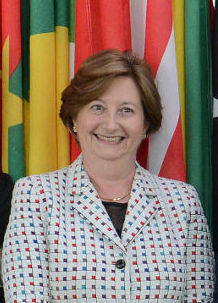

President of the Assembly of States Parties of the International Criminal Court
- In office 2021–2023
- Appointed by: Assembly of States Parties
- Preceded by: O-Gon Kwon
- Succeeded by: Päivi Kaukoranta

3rd President of the International Criminal Court
- In office 11 March 2015 – 10 March 2018
- Appointed by: Judges of the ICC
- Preceded by: Song Sang-hyun
- Succeeded by: Chile Eboe-Osuji

Judge of the International Criminal Court
- In office 18 November 2009 – 10 March 2018
- Nominated by: Argentina
- Appointed by: Assembly of States Parties

Personal details
- Born: 24 October 1954 (age 71) Córdoba Province, Argentina
- Education: National University of Córdoba; University of Limoges; University of Buenos Aires

Silvia Alejandra Fernández de Gurmendi (born 24 October 1954) is an Argentine lawyer, diplomat and judge. She was a judge at the International Criminal Court (ICC) from 18 November 2009 to 10 March 2018 and was the first woman President of the ICC from March 2015 to March 2018. In 2020 she was elected to serve as President of the Assembly of States Parties to Rome Statute of the International Criminal Court for the twentieth to twenty-second sessions (2021-2023).

== Education ==
Fernández studied law at the universities of Córdoba and Limoges, and earned a doctorate at the University of Buenos Aires.

== Career ==
Fernández trained as a diplomat 1987–1988, and entered the diplomatic service in 1989. In 2006, she became Director General for Human Rights in the Foreign Ministry.

=== Judge of the International Criminal Court, 2010-2018 ===
Fernández was elected as a judge at the ICC on 18 November 2009. During her time as judge, she regularly issued dissenting or partially dissenting opinions in high-profile cases, including opposing the opening of an ICC investigation in Côte d'Ivoire in 2011. She served as presiding judge when the ICC rejected Libya's request to annul the international arrest warrant for Saif al-Islam Gaddafi, ruling that the Libyan government was not yet capable of holding a fair trial by itself and it is obliged under international law to hand him over to the ICC. In 2014, as member of the Pre-Trial Chamber I, she later confirmed four charges of crimes against humanity against former Ivorian minister and youth activist Charles Blé Goudé and committed him to trial before a Trial Chamber.

=== President of the International Criminal Court, 2015-2018 ===
In early 2015, Fernández was elected president of the court for a term of three years. Her two vice-presidents, also appointed for three-year terms, were Joyce Aluoch and Kuniko Ozaki. With the office of the Prosecutor of the International Criminal Court held by Fatou Bensouda, four of the court’s most influential legal positions were held by women.

In August 2015, Fernández decided to reopen a hearing into whether to take action against Kenya over allegations it obstructed investigations into its President Uhuru Kenyatta, arguing that the appeals chamber had failed to properly assess the role of prosecutors and that errors prevented it "from making a conclusive determination".

=== President of the International Criminal Court's ASP, 2021-2023 ===
In December 2020, the Assembly of State Parties elected her as President of the Assembly of State Parties for the twentieth to twenty-second sessions. Her term ran from February 2021 to December 2023.

== Other activities ==
Fernández is also a visiting professor at American University Washington College of Law's Academy on Human Rights and Humanitarian Law. She is a member of the Crimes Against Humanity Initiative Advisory Council, a project of the Whitney R. Harris World Law Institute at Washington University School of Law in St. Louis to establish the world’s first treaty on the prevention and punishment of crimes against humanity. Since 2024, she is the President of the Advisory Council of the International Nuremberg Principles Academy.

== Selected publications ==
- Mit Håkan Friman: The rules of procedure and evidence and the regulations of the court. In: Jose Doria (Hrsg.): The legal regime of the International Criminal Court: essays in honour of Professor Igor Blishchenko; in memoriam Professor Igor Pavlovich Blishchenko (1930-2000). Nijhoff, Leiden 2009, ISBN 978-90-04-16308-9, S. 797–824.
- An insider's view. In: Mauro Politi (Hrsg.): The international criminal court and the crime of aggression. Aldershot, Ashgate 2004, ISBN 0-7546-2362-9, S. 175 ff.
- Mit Håkan Friman: The rules of procedure and evidence of the International Criminal Court. In: T.M.C. Asser Instituut, Institute for Private and Public International Law, International Commercial Arbitration and European Law: Yearbook of international humanitarian law. Bd. 3, 2000, ISSN 1389-1359, S. 289–336.
