= Presidency of the International Criminal Court =

Body responsible for administration of the ICC

President of the International Criminal Court
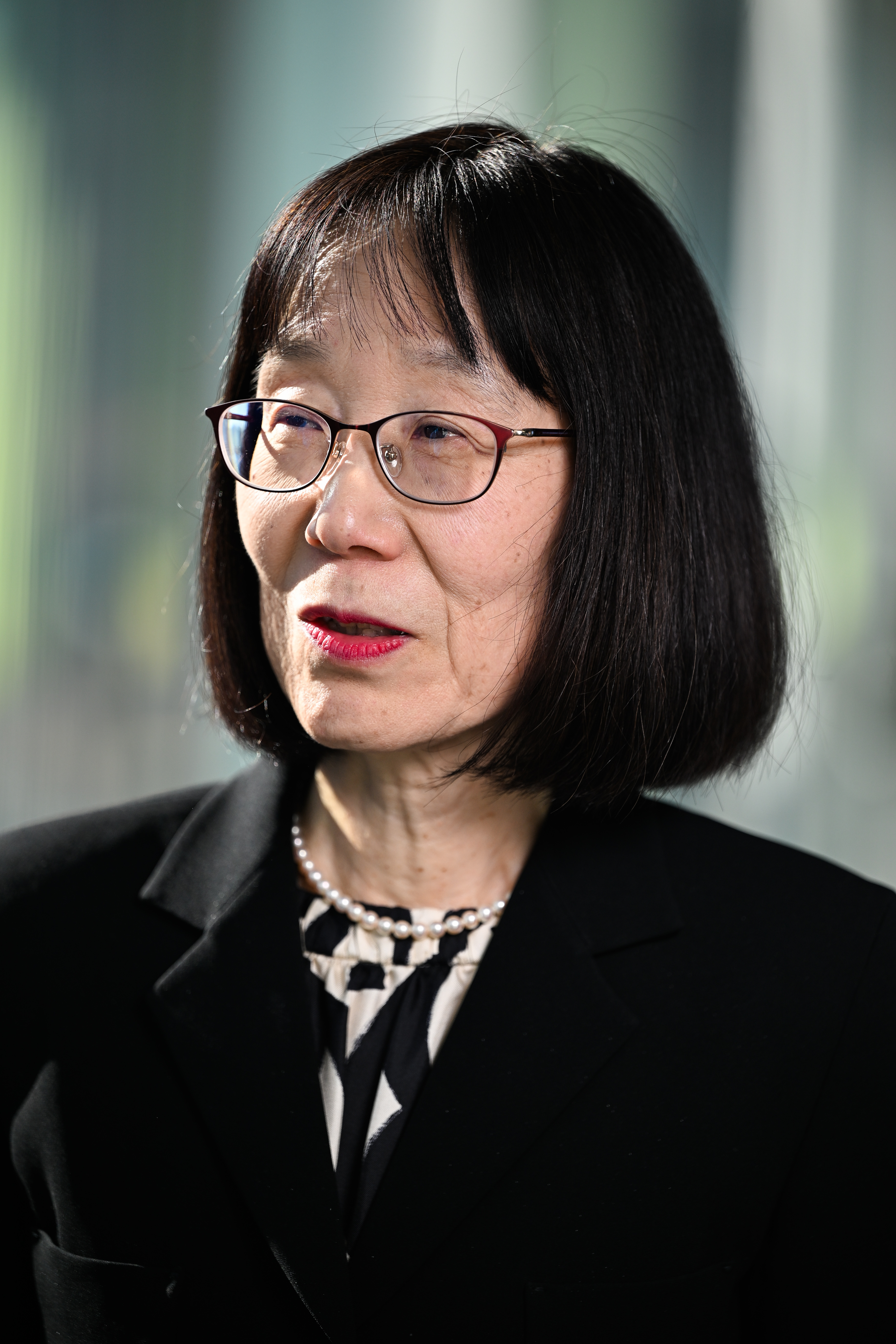
- Incumbent; Tomoko Akane since 11 March 2024
- Seat: The Hague
- Appointer: Judges of the ICC
- Term length: Three years renewable once
- Constituting instrument: Rome Statute of the International Criminal Court
- Formation: 2003
- First holder: Philippe Kirsch
- Website: The Presidency

The Presidency of the International Criminal Court is the organ responsible for the proper administration of the Court (apart from the Office of the Prosecutor).

The Presidency oversees the activities of the Registry and organises the work of the judicial divisions. It also has some responsibilities in the area of external relations, such as negotiating agreements on behalf of the court and promoting public awareness and understanding of the institution.

The Presidency comprises the President and the First and Second Vice-Presidents — three judges of the court who are elected to the Presidency by their fellow judges for a maximum of two three-year terms.

As of March 2024, the President is Tomoko Akane from Japan, who took office on 11 March 2024. Her term will expire in 2027.

Members of the Presidency of the International Criminal Court
Term	President	First Vice-President	Second Vice-President
2003–2006	(Canada) Philippe Kirsch	(Ghana) Akua Kuenyehia	(Costa Rica) Elizabeth Odio Benito
2006–2009	(Canada) Philippe Kirsch	(Ghana) Akua Kuenyehia	(Bolivia) René Blattmann
2009–2012	(South Korea) Song Sang-hyun	(Mali) Fatoumata Dembele Diarra	(Germany) Hans-Peter Kaul
2012–2015	(South Korea) Song Sang-hyun	(Botswana) Sanji Mmasenono Monageng	(Italy) Cuno Tarfusser
2015–2018	(Argentina) Silvia Fernández de Gurmendi	(Kenya) Joyce Aluoch	(Japan) Kuniko Ozaki
2018–2021	(Nigeria) Chile Eboe-Osuji	(Czech Republic) Robert Fremr	(France) Marc Perrin de Brichambaut
2021–2024	(Poland) Piotr Hofmański	(Peru) Luz del Carmen Ibáñez Carranza	(Democratic Republic of the Congo) Antoine Kesia-Mbe Mindua
2024–present	(Japan) Tomoko Akane	(Italy) Rosario Salvatore Aitala	(Benin) Reine Alapini-Gansou
