= Ana María Romero =

Bolivian journalist and public figure (1941–2010)

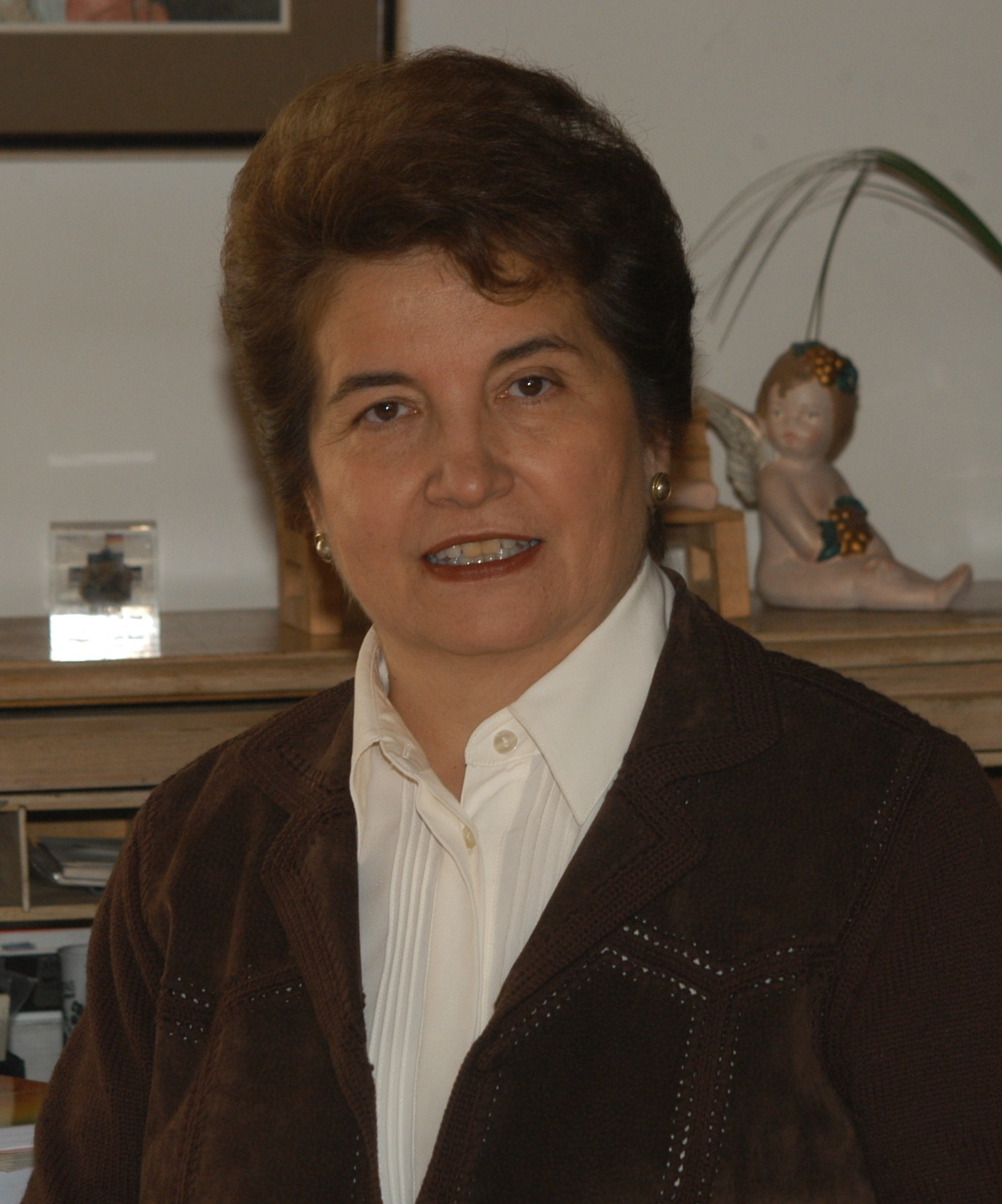
Ana Maria Romero de Campero

Ana María Romero de Campero (29 June 1941 – 26 October 2010) was a Bolivian journalist, writer, activist and influential public figure in her country. She was the first Human Rights Ombudswoman (Defensor del Pueblo) (1998–2003) of Bolivia and President of the Senate of Bolivia at the time of her death. Ana María Romero dedicated her life to promoting democracy and human rights with particular regard for those most disadvantaged in Bolivian society.

== Family and early years ==
Ana Maria Romero de Campero (born Ana María de las Nieves Romero Pringle) was born in La Paz, Bolivia into a middle class household of liberal ideas. She was christened Ana Maria de las Nieves (Ana Maria of the Snows) due to the unusual snowstorm that took place on the day of her birth. However, throughout her life and public activity she used different variants of her name, which she explained as follows: Ana Maria Romero, was her maiden name; Ana Maria Romero de Campero her married name, and the one registered on her identity card; Ana Maria Campero, her journalistic name; and Anamar, her nom de guerre.

She lived part of her childhood with her siblings under the care of her paternal grandmother, a woman whose strong character, tenacity and severe discipline definitely influenced her education. At the same time, her childhood was deeply impacted by the vicissitudes of Bolivian politics. Her father, Gonzalo Romero, was a leading figure of the Bolivian Socialist Falange (FSB) party, a political movement that joined the opposition after the April 1952 Revolution, and was subject to political persecution by the ruling regime.

Her paternal family came from the town of Cinti, in the rural area of southern Bolivia, where she often traveled during her childhood and which she liked to evoke due to the beauty of its landscape. Both her paternal grandfather and her great-grandfather had also been involved in diplomacy, journalism and politics.

Ana Maria Romero was educated at the Sacred Heart School in the city of La Paz and at the Irish Catholic School in Cochabamba, where she lived for a year when her father went into exile. Possessing strong convictions and great charisma, she showed leadership skills from her college days when she was elected president of the Catholic University's Journalism Student Center, between 1968 and 1970.

In 1961, Ana Maria Romero married Fernando A. Campero Prudencio, a marriage that lasted for 49 years until her death. She frequently portrayed her husband as a self-reliant person, who was ahead of his time and who supported her to grow professionally and intellectually. Her marriage and subsequent motherhood to three children did not prevent her from completing her university studies, developing a renowned career in journalism and excelling in public life, even at a time when these activities were primarily male-dominated.

== University studies and journalism ==
Ana Maria Romero was a precocious reader in the great library of her paternal family, which included not only literature but also politics and philosophy, and which helped to later define her inclination towards journalism. Encouraged by the domestic climate and by her uncle, the lawyer and journalist Carlos Romero, she began her career in journalism after her first two children were born.

She practiced journalism for three decades, occupying a variety of functions and positions throughout her career. She worked as a reporter, columnist and international press correspondent in Bolivia as well as abroad. Romero graduated as a journalist from the Catholic University of Bolivia in 1976. Later, she took courses in theology at Georgetown University in Washington DC, in the US (1985).

At the age of 25, Romero joined the weekly magazine of the El Diario newspaper as chronicler. While working as a journalist at the Fides News Agency and at Radio Fides (until 1979), she met key figures in the history of Bolivia, including the journalist Jesuit Luis Espinal, assassinated in March 1980. In May 1980, Ana Maria Romero founded the weekly magazine Apertura (Opening) along with her mentor José Gramunt de Moragas S.J. and other journalists. Apertura, which started as a space for the defense of democracy, survived for 10 weeks and was then forced to close as a result of the regime of terror and despotism imposed by the dictator Luis García Meza and his then Interior Minister, Luis Arce Gómez.

For seven years she led as Chief Editor and Executive Director one of her country's most influential newspapers, the national daily Presencia, owned by the Catholic Church, where earlier she had also acted as its Deputy Director and Head of Press. In 1998 she was conferred the National Journalism Award “for a work conducted with recognized ethics and professional excellence”.

Among the agencies and national and international media organizations for which she reported are the magazines TIME (US) and Proceso (Mexico); the news agencies Fides (Bolivia), Inter Press Service (Italy), and the German Press Agency DPA; and the newspapers ABC (Spain), Hoy (Ecuador), La República (Uruguay), El Diario (Bolivia), Presencia (Bolivia) and La Razón (Bolivia)

Ana Maria Romero also maintained an active guild participation. The first woman to preside over the Association of Journalists, she also founded and led the Circle of Women Journalists. During her tenure (1988-1990), the organization established the National Journalism Award. She was later elected President of the National Press Association. She also acted as Secretary General of the Latin American Catholic Press Association (UCLAP), was Member of the Permanent Council of International Catholic Union of the Press (UCIP) and Vice President of the International Federation of Newspapers.

== Ombudswoman and Human Rights ==
In 1998 she was appointed by the Bolivian National Congress as the country's first Defensor del Pueblo (an office broadly translating its intent into English as “Human Rights Ombudsman”), after being nominated by the major news organizations in the country and receiving more than two-thirds of the election votes at the National Congress.

Her ideals of freedom and inclusion, along with her purposeful defense of universal human rights, were rapidly taken up during a tenure that made history for making visible sectors that had been historically marginalized within Bolivian society. Also, her position acquired great public importance by giving the Ombudsman Office a role of mediator in many of the social and political conflicts facing the country. As Ombudswoman she denounced the violations against human rights that were taking place in the Chapare region as a result of the clashes between security forces and coca growers. Similarly, she worked against human traffic networks and in favor of discriminated groups, such as domestic workers, renal patients, AIDS victims, prisoners, and indigenous workers, among many others. She elicited public respect for her dedication to her work, accompanied by a moderate use of her public voice, always taking care to choose the most appropriate tone to issue warnings, claims and judgments.

Having become a respected figure who was at the same time feared by the political spectrum, her continuation as Ombudswoman began to be questioned by a sector of the ruling party, the Movimiento Nacionalista Revolucionario (MNR), and their representation in Congress. In September 2003, President Gonzalo Sanchez de Lozada refused to re-elect Ana Maria Romero into office and ordered the bench of the MNR to block the vote in her favor in Congress. This provoked a confrontation with Vice President Carlos Mesa Gisbert, who tried unsuccessfully to prevent this move, given the excellent reputation of the departing Ombudswoman. In 2003, Ana Maria Romero completed her constitutional mandate as Ombudswoman, with a record that earned her widespread recognition and numerous national and international awards.

In 2004 Romero created the UNIR Foundation (Fundación UNIR), a non-governmental organization that has since been working in the construction of mediation processes and promotion of a culture of peace in Bolivia through initiatives of dialogue, negotiation during conflicts, information and deliberation, which she directed until 2008. During the political crisis of 2007 and 2008, generated by the opposition of Bolivia's eastern Departments of Beni, Pando, Santa Cruz, Chuquisaca and Tarija to the Government of the Movimiento al Socialismo (MAS) and the Presidency of Evo Morales, the UNIR Foundation sponsored several workshops and initiatives for dialogue in these Departments, as well as in La Paz and El Alto, to bring these politically confrontational sectors, which held entrenched positions, closer together.

Ana María Romero headed the UNIR Foundation until December 2008, when she retired to take a break and devote her time to writing a novel, which she would not be able to finish due to her entry into politics and her subsequent illness.

== Political life ==
Ana Maria Romero was an active advocate of democracy and human rights in her country. In 1979 she interrupted her career as journalist to take up the post of Minister of Press and Information, during the brief Government of Walter Guevara. Guevara became Bolivia's President by constitutional succession in August 1979 but was overthrown by a military coup led by Colonel Alberto Natusch in November of that year in the so-called "All Saints Massacre", where more than 100 people were killed in a massive deployment of violence that showed outstanding brutality.

During this period, Ana Maria Romero was given the task of coordinating with the national press and more than 100 international journalists that had arrived in the country to cover the Ninth General Assembly of the Organization of American States (OAS). Bolivia obtained a major diplomatic victory during this gathering by approving a declaration which recognized "the Bolivian maritime claim as a matter of hemispheric interest".

When she assumed the Ministry of Press and Information portfolio, her father, Gonzalo Romero, was already Bolivia's Ambassador to the OAS. Father and daughter met in public service, where he gave an outstanding performance as mastermind and chief promoter of the OAS resolution in 1979 which urged Chile to give Bolivia a sovereign and useful outlet to the Pacific Ocean.

But Romero's most decisive performance as Minister was as the head of the democratic resistance to the military coup. On 1 November 1979, as Colonel Natusch took power by force, Ana Maria Romero bravely defended the democratic Government in radio speeches throughout that bloody day. It was she who performed the function of discrediting the versions of Guevara's resignation being put forward by the de facto regime, announcing the existence of a clandestine Constitutional Government and defending the rule of law.

Years later, on 11 October 2003, the Bolivian army forces, on the orders of the Government of Gonzalo Sanchez de Lozada, fired on an angry crowd from the city of El Alto. The crowd had been trying to stop a convoy carrying fuel and food into the City of La Paz, which needed these supplies after several days of blockages by social movements unified around the premise of the nationalization of hydrocarbons and the convening of a new Constituent Assembly to refound Bolivia. The shooting left 29 people dead and countless wounded. In reaction to these events, Ana Maria Romero led a hunger strike calling for peace and the resignation of Sanchez de Lozada. With indigenous leaders, intellectuals, students, teachers and representatives of civil society, she spoke strongly against the violence that took place in El Alto and in defense of the large number of victims of what came to be known as the "Gas War".

Thanks to her influence and steep rise in influence, Romero received numerous invitations to be a candidate for president and vice president, both from parties of the right and left, which she rejected consistently, respecting the provisions of the Ombudsman Act of Bolivia that prevents those who occupy this function to apply for any elective public office during the five years following the termination of their mandate. Despite the fact that this law violated her civil and political rights, Romero unreservedly complied, because "it was important to establish that the institution should not serve as a political springboard into politics, as was the case in other countries".

After this period expired, Romero accepted an invitation from Evo Morales to run for the first Senate seat of the Department of La Paz in the December 2009 election for the Bolivia's Plurinational Legislative Assembly (National Congress). She ran in the lists of the MAS party, but as an independent candidate, and was elected by a wide margin. While Romero went to the election as an independent candidate – as she was not registered in any political party - her determination generated much controversy and divided opinion in the country, provoking reactions of both support and disapproval. This situation motivated her to publicly explain her reasons through an open letter, in which she stated the following:

“(…) My entry into politics has generated and will continue to generate all kinds of reactions. I receive them as part of the cost of entering the public arena and as a sign of the polarization in which we live today. We complain much about what is happening in the country; we spend our lives saying what should or should not be done, throwing pebbles at the windows of power but are never willing to change things from within. And I say we because I was also part of this Greek tragedy chorus until last week. But the horror that we may end up dividing our country and the concern that the process which could enable us to build an equitable and just country might become frustrated, have sunk-in in me during this time of my retirement and I have decided to take the step forward. I am acting under the conviction that I cannot deny offering my efforts to build bridges and to seek agreements –which is what President Morales has asked me to help with. This, however, will not prevent me from looking critically at the process [of change], as I consider that its shortcomings or excesses will not be corrected with hatred and animosities but by properly understanding the exceptional moment in which live. We all have our share of responsibility in helping to bring about the success of those who are proposing to leave behind a long night of injustice and oppression.

As is the case with the indigenous people, women are conquering a space of equality in the political world where we would like to make a difference. I love Bolivia, I love my people, I feel a deep commitment to their future and, in particular, with the humble and their destiny. I believe it takes people from within the Plurinational Legislative Assembly to help articulate the agreements required to consolidate changes, to listen to the ideas of others with respect, and to shape the new State that will emerge from the New Political Constitution, focusing on the common good. I feel privileged to be one of them. My life is leaving me, and I have decided to spend it in the attempt. This will be my last and hopefully a fruitful effort to act so that we Bolivians would understand each other and build a country without hatred, racism or misunderstood regionalisms for our sons, daughters and their descendants. A country in short, where –to paraphrase Carlos Hugo Molina – we all feel at ease".

In January 2010, the nascent Plurinational Legislative Assembly unanimously elected her as President of the Senate, a position which she had intended to use to encourage communication and consensus building among the various sectors of the polarized country. Her first interventions as senator, leading the discussions for the approval of the Senate's Internal Rules, give testimony to the moral weight and respect that her public history and life elicited across all political movements represented in the Bolivian legislative body.

Soon after being sworn in as President of the Senate, she had to request license from her post to undergo emergency surgery (February 2010), due to a serious intestinal ailment that a few months later would end her life.

== Literary work and awards ==
As a writer, Ana Maria Romero de Campero published the following books:

- "Not All Nor So Holy, Chronicles On Power", which recounts her experience in the Ministry of Press and Information, during the presidency of Dr. Walter Guevara and the democratic resistance to the military coup of November 1979. Published by Offset Boliviana Ed. (Edobol) (1996, two editions).

- "Intimate Country”, which includes a selection of columns that she wrote under the pseudonym of Ana Mar in the Bolivian newspaper La Razón from 1996 to 1998. Plural Publishers (2002).

- "Crossed Wires". A fiction novel inspired by her experiences in the Latin American Bureau of the news agency United Press International (UPI) in Washington DC. Published by Gente Común Editorial (2005).

She also published numerous articles and essays on topics of social policy, human rights, ethics, social communication, conflict resolution, and peace culture.

She received numerous national and international awards, including the nomination for the Nobel Peace Prize as part of the "1,000 Women for peace in the world" initiative (2005), France’s Legion of Honour for her commitment and defense of human rights (2004), and the German Bertelsmann Foundation’s Award for her contribution to democracy and the rule of law (2001) together with René Blattmann, a former Minister of Justice from Bolivia.

== Remembrance ==
After her death, on October 25, 2010 - when the Bolivian Government declared seven days of official mourning – Ana Maria Romero de Campero has been the subject of several displays of posthumous recognition, commemorating and highlighting her legacy in the areas of journalism, the defense of freedom of speech and human rights, and her work for social justice and peace.

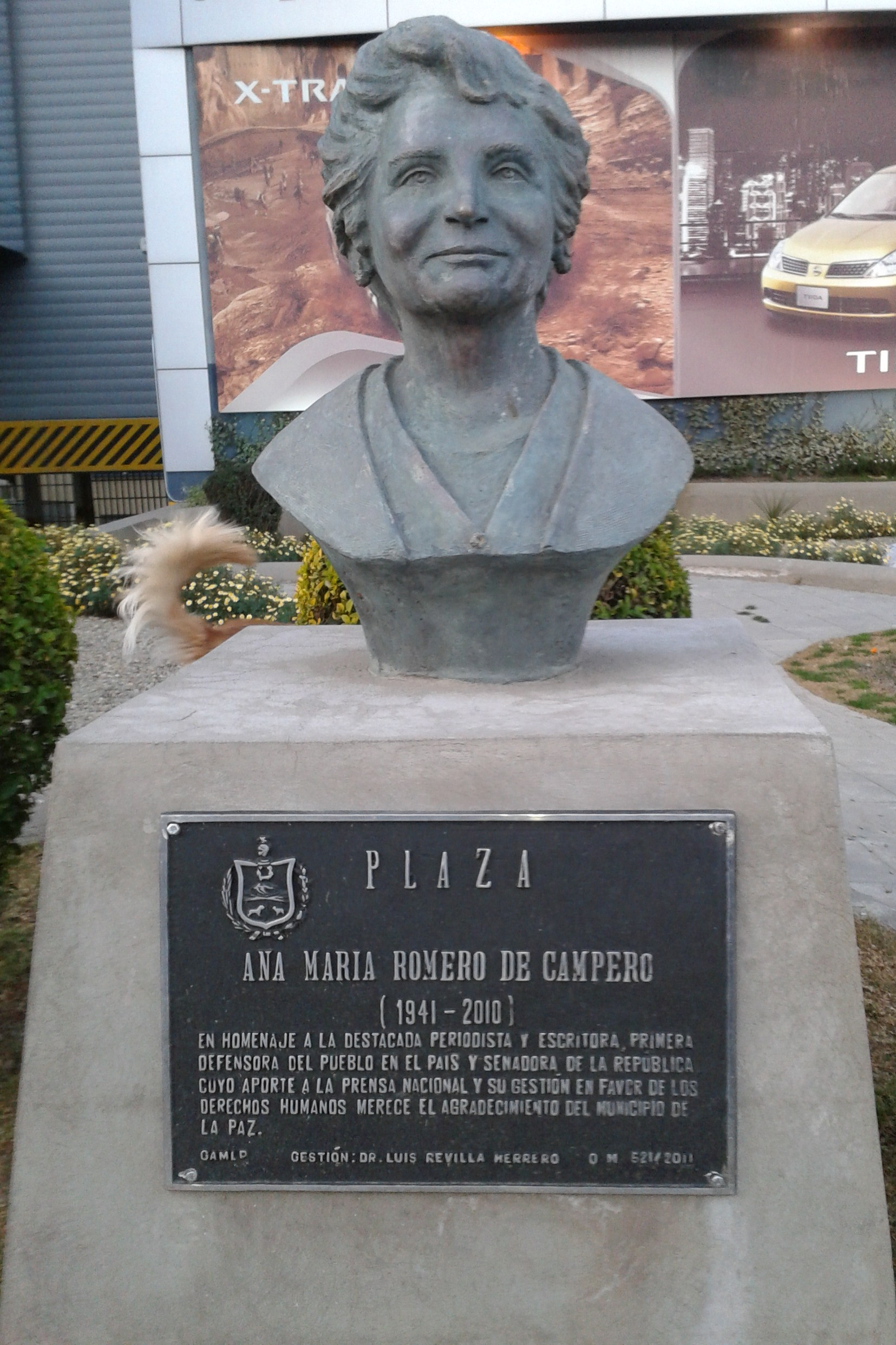
Statuette at Ana Maria Romero square

In October 2011, the Municipality of the City of La Paz inaugurated and nominated a small park in her memory, located in the neighborhood of Sopocachi, where a statuette of the Bolivian journalist’s was erected.

Various Bolivian organizations instituted awards that bear her name:

- The Association of Journalists of La Paz, of which she once was President, created the yearly Professional Merit Award "Ana Maria Romero de Campero", to recognize those journalists or citizens whose work in the defense of freedom of speech stands out.

- The UNIR Foundation instituted the “Culture of Peace National Award” in her name, in order to highlight the trajectory and consequent behavior of natural or legal persons who have defended and championed the construction of a peaceful society, grounded in equity and justice, just as she did in her life. It is a biannual award, granted on the International Day of Peace (September 21st) and is organized by a number of institutions along with the UNIR Foundation. In its first edition in 2012, the award was given to the Priest Gregorio Iriarte.

- The Bolivian organization "Training and Citizen Rights" (CDC by their Spanish initials) and its network of professional lawyers in human rights, created the national human rights award "Ana Maria Romero de Campero", with the purpose of recognizing citizens who have distinguished themselves in the promotion, recognition and defense of human rights, as well as in the promotion of democratic values.

In a different expression of recognition for her work, at the spontaneous initiative of a group of parents of the San Miguel Urbanization in 7th District of the city of El Alto, a new educational unit was named after the Bolivian journalist in that area. It serves elementary school children that live with high levels of marginalization.

Also, the newspaper “Opinion” of Cochabamba, Bolivia published a special edition of its Special Report supplement: the article "Anamar - Loved by People and Feared by Politicians." This report reviews Ana Maria Romero's life, work and contribution to journalism, the defense of human rights, and the history of her country. This journalistic piece was awarded the 2012 National Journalism Award for printed media, the country's highest award of its kind, granted by the Association of Journalists of La Paz.

== Bibliography ==
- Mesa de Jose, Gisbert Teresa, Mesa Gisbert Carlos, Historia de Bolivia (La Paz: Ed. Guisbert, 2008) ISBN 978-99905-833-3-5
- Romero, Ana María, Cables Cruzados (La Paz: Ed. Gente Común, 2005) Introductory biographical notes.
