= Organisation for National Reconstruction =

The Organisation for National Reconstruction (ONR) was a political party in Trinidad and Tobago. The party received the second-highest number of votes in the 1981 general elections, but failed to win a seat. Prior to the 1986 elections it merged into the new National Alliance for Reconstruction.

== History ==
The party was founded by Karl Hudson-Phillips, who had resigned from the ruling People's National Movement in 1973 when Prime Minister Eric Williams reversed his decision to resign from politics. Hudson-Phillips had been the main contender to succeed Williams - once Williams returned there was no longer room for a person who had openly expressed an interest in leading the party. Hudson-Phillips went on to form the 'National Land Tenants and Ratepayers Association of Trinidad and Tobago in 1974, a right-of-centre body. After building a support base among the middle and upper classes, he launched the ONR in 1980. Despite receiving 22.2% of the vote, the party failed to win any seats, whilst the United Labour Front (which had received 15.2% of the vote) won ten seats.

This setback led to the ONR forging a closer relationship with the other opposition parties, which had organised themselves as the National Alliance prior to the elections. In the 1983 local elections the ONR won 26 of the 120 local government seats, while the National Alliance won 40. This was the first time since 1959 that the PNM had not won the majority of seats contested in any election in Trinidad (the DAC had taken control of the Tobago House of Assembly in 1980). Following on this success, the three parties making up the National Alliance and the ONR merged to form a single party, the National Alliance for Reconstruction. In the 1986 general elections the NAR won 33 of the 36 seats in Parliament and was able to form the new government.

Hudson-Phillips did not take a major role in the NAR government (according to Basdeo Panday this was because of animosity between Hudson-Phillips and A. N. R. Robinson, the "compromise" leader of the NAR). However, several other ONR members held prominent posts in the NAR government. After the NAR folded, many former ONR members joined the United National Congress, while others returned to the PNM.
