= Karl Hudson-Phillips =

Trinidad and Tobago judge (1933–2014)

Karl Terrence Hudson-Phillips

Judge of the International Criminal Court
- In office 11 March 2003 – 30 September 2007
- Nominated by: Trinidad and Tobago
- Appointed by: Assembly of States Parties

Attorney General of Trinidad and Tobago
- In office 1969–1973

Personal details
- Born: 20 April 1933
- Died: 15 January 2014 (aged 80); London, United Kingdom

Karl Terrence Hudson-Phillips, ORTT, QC (20 April 1933 – 16 January 2014) was an Attorney-General of Trinidad and Tobago and a judge of the International Criminal Court. He was also lead counsel in the murder trial of Grenadian Prime Minister Maurice Bishop.

== Biography ==
Hudson-Phillips attended Tranquillity School and Queen's Royal College in Port of Spain, Trinidad, before going to England to read law at Selwyn College, Cambridge. In 1959, he was called to the bar at Gray's Inn, London. He returned to Trinidad and Tobago where he established a distinguished legal practice and was conferred the honour of Queen's Counsel - the mark of professional eminence in the British Commonwealth in 1971. He was the youngest Attorney General within the Commonwealth at the age of 36. Hudson-Phillips graduated from the University of Cambridge, England (1952–1956), M.A, LLB. He was a member of the Bar of the following countries: United Kingdom, Trinidad and Tobago, Guyana, Barbados, St Kitts, Antigua, The British Virgin Islands and Jamaica.

He entered active politics in 1966, when he was elected a Member of Parliament for the constituency of Diego Martin East. Prior to that, he had been active in student politics and social activities and was the President of the Cambridge University West Indian Society in 1945–1956. He was also Chairman of the first Overseas Party Group of the ruling People's National Movement (PNM) Party in 1958, soon after Dr Eric Williams came into power.

Hudson-Phillips returned to Trinidad in 1959 and commenced his law practicewith his father, who was then a prominent member of the Trinidad Bar. He became active in politics of Trinidad at a Party level and served on several party committees being the Party delegate to the conference on the Constitution for an independent Trinidad and Tobago in 1961. He was appointed a member of the Board of the Trinidad and Tobago Electricity Commission on which he served for four years from 1962-1966.

On entering Parliament in 1966, he continued his law practice while being introduced into active politics at Parliamentary level. In 1968, he made his first major speech in the House when he pioleted the first amendment to the Independent Constitution of Trinidad and Tobago to provide a widening of the provisions permitting Trinidad and Tobago citizens to have dual citizenship and to extend the date of application for citizenship by certain classes of Trinidad residents.

Between the period 1966 and 1969, he was the Government's delegate to several international conferences including, Conference of non-nuclear states -Geneva 1968 and Law of the Sea Conference 1969. Hudson-Phillips became a minister with Cabinet rank on 29 September 1969 and, on 24 December 1969, at age 36, the youngest serving Attorney General in the British Commonwealth.

Soon after his appointment to Attorney General, civil disturbances started in Trinidad and Tobago. The Black Power riots and Army Mutiny of 1970.

In 1973, Hudson-Phillips fell out of favour with then Prime Minister Eric Williams (for openly campaigning to replace Williams, who had spoken about retirement). This ended his political career in the PNM.

In 1974, Hudson-Phillips founded the National Land Tenants and Ratepayers Association of Trinidad and Tobago. In 1980, he founded the Organisation for National Reconstruction (ONR), a political party which contested the 1981 General Elections. Despite getting the second-highest vote tally in the election, the ONR failed to secure a single seat in Parliament. The ONR went on to form an accommodation with the National Alliance to contest the 1983 local government elections, and went on the merge with those parties to form the National Alliance for Reconstruction (NAR). Hudson-Phillips and Basdeo Panday, as the leaders of the two largest factions in what became the NAR, decided to step aside and allow A. N. R. Robinson, leader of one of the smaller parties, to become party leader. The NAR contested the 1986 general elections and won 33 of the 36 seats in Parliament. Hudson-Phillips did not take an active role in the party after the election.

In addition to the Grenada murder trial, Hudson-Phillips has been involved in many high-profile cases throughout the Caribbean, as both Prosecutor and Defender. In 1999, he was elected President of the Law Association of Trinidad and Tobago.

In February 2003, Hudson-Phillips was elected to the first ever bench of International Criminal Court judges. As "dean of the judges", he chaired the first meetings of judges before the election of the Presidency. He also contributed actively to the drafting of the Regulations of the Court. He resigned from the court for personal reasons on 14 March 2007, effective 30 September 2007.

On 23 July 2010, Sihasak Phuangketkeow, President of the UN Human Rights Council, announced that Hudson-Phillips would head a panel of experts to investigate whether Israel's Gaza flotilla raid on 31 May 2010 breached international law. Along with Hudson-Phillips, the panel included Briton Desmond Lorenz de Silva and Malaysian Mary Shanthi Dairiam.

Hudson-Phillips died in London on 16 January 2014.

== Publications ==
- 1968: The Historical Development of the Settlement of Trade Disputes in Trinidad and Tobago. I.L.O. Monograph.
- 1987: A Case for Greater Public Participation in the Legislative Process. Statute Law Review.
- 1997: Law and Practice of Arbitration in Trinidad and Tobago. International Commercial Arbitration Bulletin.
