= 2003 International Criminal Court judges election =

- 4–7 February 2003

All 18 seats on the International Criminal Court
- Elected judges (Republic of Ireland) Maureen Harding Clark (Mali) Fatoumata Dembélé Diarra (South Korea) Sang-hyun Song (Brazil) Sylvia Helena de Figueiredo Steiner (Ghana) Akua Kuenyehia (Costa Rica) Elizabeth Odio Benito (South Africa) Navanethem Pillay (Trinidad and Tobago) Karl T. Hudson-Phillips (Cyprus) Gheorghios M. Pikis (Canada) Philippe Kirsch (Finland) Erkki Kourula (United Kingdom) Adrian Fulford (Latvia) Anita Ušacka (Germany) Hans-Peter Kaul (Bolivia) René Blattmann (Italy) Mauro Politi (Samoa) Tuiloma Neroni Slade (France) Claude Jorda

An ordinary election for the first full bench of 18 judges of the International Criminal Court was held during the first resumption of the 1st session of the Assembly of States Parties to the Rome Statute in New York between 4 and 7 February 2003.

== Background ==
The judges elected at this election were to take office on 11 March 2003. Six judges were to remain in office until 2006 (re-eligible), six until 2009 (not re-eligible) and another six for the whole nine-year term until 2012 (not re-eligible).

The election was governed by the Rome Statute of the International Criminal Court. Its article 36(8)(a) states that "[t]he States Parties shall, in the selection of judges, take into account the need, within the membership of the Court, for:

- (i) The representation of the principal legal systems of the world;
- (ii) Equitable geographical representation; and
- (iii) A fair representation of female and male judges."

Furthermore, article 36(3)(b) and 36(5) provide for two lists:

- List A contains those judges that "[h]ave established competence in criminal law and procedure, and the necessary relevant experience, whether as judge, prosecutor, advocate or in other similar capacity, in criminal proceedings";
- List B contains those who "[h]ave established competence in relevant areas of international law such as international humanitarian law and the law of human rights, and extensive experience in a professional legal capacity which is of relevance to the judicial work of the Court".

Each candidate must belong to exactly one list.

Further rules on the nomination and election of judges were adopted by the Assembly of States Parties in September 2002.

== Nomination process ==
The nomination period for the 2003 election lasted from 9 September to 30 November 2002. The following persons were nominated:

Name	Nationality	List A or B		Regional criteria					Gender	
Name	Nationality	List A	List B	African	Asian	E. European	GRULAC	WEOG	Female	Male
René Blattmann	Bolivia		X				X			X
Antonio Boggiano	Argentina		X				X			X
Marc Bossuyt	Belgium		X					X		X
Maureen Harding Clark	Ireland	X						X	X	
Ion Diaconu	Romania		X			X				X
Fatoumata Dembélé Diarra	Mali	X		X					X	
Jargalsaikhany Enkhsaikhan	Mongolia		X		X					X
Adrian Fulford	United Kingdom	X						X		X
Ioannis Giannidis	Greece	X						X		X
Dimitar Gochev	Bulgaria		X			X				X
Bunchhat Heng Vong	Cambodia		X		X					X
Karl T. Hudson-Phillips	Trinidad and Tobago	X					X			X
Claude Jorda	France	X						X		X
Ivo Josipović	Croatia		X			X				X
Adolphus G. Karibi-Whyte	Nigeria	X		X						X
Hajnalka Kárpáti	Hungary	X				X			X	
Joseph-Médard Katuala Kaba Kashala	Democratic Republic of the Congo	X		X						X
Hans-Peter Kaul	Germany		X					X		X
Philippe Kirsch	Canada		X					X		X
Erkki Kourula	Finland		X					X		X
Akua Kuenyehia	Ghana		X	X					X	
Kamugumya S. K. Lugakingira	Tanzania	X		X						X
Roberto MacLean Ugarteche	Peru		X				X			X
Doudou Ndir	Senegal	X		X						X
Rafael Nieto Navia	Colombia		X				X			X
Daniel D. N. Nsereko	Uganda		X	X						X
Elizabeth Odio Benito	Costa Rica	X					X		X	
Barbara Liliane Ott	Switzerland	X						X	X	
Gheorghios M. Pikis	Cyprus	X			X					X
Navanethem Pillay	South Africa		X	X					X	
Mauro Politi	Italy		X					X		X
Almiro Rodrigues	Portugal	X						X		X
Víctor Rodríguez-Cedeño	Venezuela		X				X			X
Mory Ousmane Sissoko	Niger	X		X						X
Tuiloma Neroni Slade	Samoa	X			X					X
Raymond C. Sock	Gambia		X	X						X
Sang-hyun Song	South Korea	X			X					X
Sylvia H. de Figueiredo Steiner	Brazil	X					X		X	
Timoci Uluiburotu Tuivaga	Fiji	X			X					X
Anita Ušacka	Latvia		X			X			X	
Juan Antonio Yáñez-Barnuevo	Spain		X					X		X
Eleonora Zielińska	Poland	X				X			X	
Boštjan Zupančič	Slovenia	X				X				X
		22	21	10	6	7	8	12	10	33

The candidatures of Luís María Benítez Riera of Paraguay and of Kocou A. Capo-Chichi of Benin were withdrawn.

== Minimum voting requirements ==
Minimum voting requirements governed part of the election. This was to ensure that articles 36(5) and 36(8)(a) cited above were fulfilled. The following minimum voting requirements applied initially:

Regarding the List A or B requirement, there was a minimum voting requirement for nine judges from List A and five judges from List B.

Regarding the regional criteria, there were minimum voting requirements for three African, two Asian, two Eastern European, three Latin American and Caribbean and three Western European and other judges. The base requirement was three judges from each regional group, but this was reduced by one for the Asian and Eastern European groups because each comprised fewer than one sixth of the States Parties at the time.

Regarding the gender criteria, there was a minimum voting requirement for six female and six male judges.

The regional and gender requirements could be adjusted according to the number of candidates. The minimum voting requirements were also updated after each ballot to account for judges already elected. Regional and gender requirements that could no longer be jointly fulfilled were discontinued, and all remaining regional and gender requirements were dropped after the fourth ballot. The List A or B requirement remained active until a sufficient number of judges had been elected from each list.

The voting requirements were as follows:

Criterion	Ex ante voting requirement	Number of candidates	Adjusted voting requirement	Adjusted requirement equals ex ante?
Lists A or B
List A	9	22	9	Yes
List B	5	21	5	Yes
Regional criteria
African states	3	10	3	Yes
Asian states	2	6	2	Yes
Eastern European states	2	7	2	Yes
Latin American and Caribbean States	3	8	3	Yes
Western European and other States	3	12	3	Yes
Gender criteria
Female	6	10	6	Yes
Male	6	33	6	Yes

== Ballots ==
The ballots took place from 4 to 7 February 2003. The results were as follows:

Name	Nationality	List A or B	Region	Gender	4 February	5 February		6 February					7 February		
Name	Nationality	List A or B	Region	Gender	Round 1	Round 2	Round 3	Round 4	Round 5	Round 6	Round 7	Round 8	Round 9	Round 10	Round 11
Number of States Parties voting					83	80	83	83	85	85	85	85	85	85	85
Two-thirds majority					56	54	56	56	57	57	57	57	57	57	57
Maureen Harding Clark	Ireland	List A	Western European and Other States	Female	65	elected									
Fatoumata Dembélé Diarra	Mali	List A	African States	Female	65	elected									
Sang-hyun Song	South Korea	List A	Asian States	Male	63	elected									
Sylvia H. de Figueiredo Steiner	Brazil	List A	Latin American and Caribbean States	Female	61	elected									
Akua Kuenyehia	Ghana	List B	African States	Female	60	elected									
Elizabeth Odio Benito	Costa Rica	List A	Latin American and Caribbean States	Female	60	elected									
Navanethem Pillay	South Africa	List B	African States	Female	56	elected									
Karl T. Hudson-Phillips	Trinidad and Tobago	List A	Latin American and Caribbean States	Male	53	49	56	elected							
Gheorghios M. Pikis	Cyprus	List A	Asian States	Male	43	47	50	60	elected						
Philippe Kirsch	Canada	List B	Western European and Other States	Male	55	46	54	57	elected						
Erkki Kourula	Finland	List B	Western European and Other States	Male	51	53	54	56	elected						
Adrian Fulford	United Kingdom	List A	Western European and Other States	Male	42	45	47	50	50	54	53	52	59	elected	
Anita Ušacka	Latvia	List B	Eastern European States	Female	46	31	37	52	49	51	50	55	59	elected	
Hans-Peter Kaul	Germany	List B	Western European and Other States	Male	43	45	48	47	54	50	50	46	57	elected	
René Blattmann	Bolivia	List B	Latin American and Caribbean States	Male	30	27	30	39	48	51	51	46	48	50	49
Mauro Politi	Italy	List B	Western European and Other States	Male	46	46	49	52	54	44	41	42	49	47	47
Claude Jorda	France	List A	Western European and Other States	Male	43	43	43	46	45	44	46	43	46	45	45
Ivo Josipović	Croatia	List B	Eastern European States	Male	26	30	39	47	49	42	41	39	45	44	38
Barbara Liliane Ott	Switzerland	List A	Western European and Other States	Female	45	36	36	38	39	44	42	34	37	31	34
Tuiloma Neroni Slade	Samoa	List A	Asian States	Male	34	30	33	32	34	43	46	44	42	39	31
Adolphus G. Karibi-Whyte	Nigeria	List A	African States	Male	30	19	21	30	27	37	37	33	36	29	30
Doudou Ndir	Senegal	List A	African States	Male	39	17	19	19	19	27	27	26	26	19	18
Bunchhat Heng Vong	Cambodia	List B	Asian States	Male	15	10	8	8	6	5	7	10	10	9	9
Antonio Boggiano	Argentina	List B	Latin American and Caribbean States	Male	18	7	11	9	9	11	9	9	withdrawn		
Juan Antonio Yáñez-Barnuevo	Spain	List B	Western European and Other States	Male	28	24	22	35	26	21	17	withdrawn			
Boštjan Zupančič	Slovenia	List A	Eastern European States	Male	27	27	27	23	10	withdrawn					
Ioannis Giannidis	Greece	List A	Western European and Other States	Male	14	15	18	11	8	withdrawn					
Hajnalka Kárpáti	Hungary	List A	Eastern European States	Female	35	26	24	20	8	withdrawn					
Dimitar Gochev	Bulgaria	List B	Eastern European States	Male	18	18	20	21	5	withdrawn					
Eleonora Zielińska	Poland	List A	Eastern European States	Female	36	26	24	15	5	withdrawn					
Ion Diaconu	Romania	List B	Eastern European States	Male	23	23	20	15	withdrawn						
Víctor Rodríguez-Cedeño	Venezuela	List B	Latin American and Caribbean States	Male	20	9	10	8	withdrawn						
Almiro Rodrigues	Portugal	List A	Western European and Other States	Male	28	24	19	withdrawn							
Rafael Nieto Navia	Colombia	List B	Latin American and Caribbean States	Male	16	7	8	withdrawn							
Mory Ousmane Sissoko	Niger	List A	African States	Male	9	7	7	withdrawn							
Jargalsaikhany Enkhsaikhan	Mongolia	List B	Asian States	Male	27	11	6	withdrawn							
Timoci Uluiburotu Tuivaga	Fiji	List A	Asian States	Male	14	7	6	withdrawn							
Joseph-Médard Katuala Kaba Kashala	Democratic Republic of the Congo	List A	African States	Male	14	8	5	withdrawn							
Roberto MacLean Ugarteche	Peru	List B	Latin American and Caribbean States	Male	18	10	withdrawn								
Marc Bossuyt	Belgium	List B	Western European and Other States	Male	20	9	withdrawn								
Daniel D. N. Nsereko	Uganda	List B	African States	Male	20	9	withdrawn								
Raymond C. Sock	Gambia	List B	African States	Male	9	withdrawn									
Kamugumya S. K. Lugakingira	Tanzania	List A	African States	Male	8	withdrawn									

Name	Nationality	List A or B	Region	Gender	7 February										
Name	Nationality	List A or B	Region	Gender	Round 12	Round 13	Round 14	Round 15	Round 16	Round 17	Round 18	Round 19	Round 20	Round 21	Round 22
Number of States Parties voting					85	84	84	84	85	85	85	85	85	85	83
Two-thirds majority					57	56	56	56	57	57	57	57	57	57	56
René Blattmann	Bolivia	List B	Latin American and Caribbean States	Male	52	57	elected								
Mauro Politi	Italy	List B	Western European and Other States	Male	48	46	45	48	52	52	52	54	56	58	elected
Claude Jorda	France	List A	Western European and Other States	Male	47	47	50	48	47	47	47	49	48	49	45
Tuiloma Neroni Slade	Samoa	List A	Asian States	Male	29	27	25	22	28	28	39	39	37	42	44
Ivo Josipović	Croatia	List B	Eastern European States	Male	40	42	37	41	40	41	45	42	39	37	40
Adolphus G. Karibi-Whyte	Nigeria	List A	African States	Male	31	29	27	24	26	24	21	20	23	20	14
Doudou Ndir	Senegal	List A	African States	Male	16	15	10	15	15	16	15	13	13	12	10
Barbara Liliane Ott	Switzerland	List A	Western European and Other States	Female	33	31	25	22	19	17	withdrawn				
Bunchhat Heng Vong	Cambodia	List B	Asian States	Male	8	6	5	5	withdrawn						

Name	Nationality	List A or B	Region	Gender	7 February										
Name	Nationality	List A or B	Region	Gender	Round 23	Round 24	Round 25	Round 26	Round 27	Round 28	Round 29	Round 30	Round 31	Round 32	Round 33
Number of States Parties voting					85	84	85	85	85	85	84	84	83	83	80
Two-thirds majority					57	56	57	57	57	57	56	56	56	56	54
Tuiloma Neroni Slade	Samoa	List A	Asian States	Male	45	46	46	49	52	58	elected				
Claude Jorda	France	List A	Western European and Other States	Male	45	44	44	44	44	41	40	46	50	53	57
Adolphus G. Karibi-Whyte	Nigeria	List A	African States	Male	24	20	19	17	19	16	12	8	3	6	23
Ivo Josipović	Croatia	List B	Eastern European States	Male	37	35	36	40	42	38	32	30	30	24	withdrawn
Doudou Ndir	Senegal	List A	African States	Male	withdrawn										

The minimum voting requirements are imposed on the ballots cast, not on the results. Thus, there is no guarantee that a corresponding number of judges is elected. In this election, all but one of the targets where achieved:

Criterion	Initial minimal voting requirement	Corresponding number of judges elected?
List A	9	Yes, after 28th ballot
List B	5	Yes, after 9th ballot
African	3	Yes, after 1st ballot
Asian	2	Yes, after 4th ballot
Eastern European	2	No, one judge elected
Latin American and Caribbean	3	Yes, after 3rd ballot
Western European and other	3	Yes, after 4th ballot
Female	6	Yes, after 1st ballot
Male	6	Yes, after 9th ballot

Note that the minimum voting requirements according to region and gender were dropped after the 4th ballot and were thus no longer being imposed when a sixth male judge and the only Eastern European judge were elected in the 9th ballot.

Lots were drawn to assign the 18 elected judges to the different initial term lengths as follows:

3 years	Tuiloma Neroni Slade; Samoa	Sang-hyun Song; South Korea	Hans-Peter Kaul; Germany	Erkki Kourula; Finland	Akua Kuenyehia; Ghana	Anita Ušacka; Latvia
6 years	Claude Jorda; France	Gheorghios M. Pikis; Cyprus	René Blattmann; Bolivia	Philippe Kirsch; Canada	Navanethem Pillay; South Africa	Mauro Politi; Italy
9 years	Maureen Harding Clark; Ireland	Fatoumata Dembélé Diarra; Mali	Adrian Fulford; United Kingdom	Karl T. Hudson-Phillips; Trinidad and Tobago	Elizabeth Odio Benito; Costa Rica	Sylvia H. de Figueiredo Steiner; Brazil
