= Heng Vong Bunchhat =

Cambodian legal expert

Heng Vong Bunchhat (Khmer: ហេង វង្សប៊ុនឆាត) is a Cambodian lawyer, who is a senior adviser to the Government best known for setting up the Khmer Rouge Tribunal. He was nominated by the Royal Government of Cambodia for election to the International Criminal Court in 2003. He is considered as the father of the Constitution of Cambodia, having drafted both the republican Constitution of 1974 and the royalist Constitution of 1993.

== Biography ==
Heng Vong Bunchhat was born to a wealthy family in Phnom Penh Cambodia on June 17, 1943.

He left for France in 1959 at age 16 to study at a high school in Sens. In 1970, Heng Vong Bunchhat earned a doctorate in law from the Paris-Sorbonne University in France and returned to Cambodia where he became dean of the faculty of law of the Royal University of Law and Economics in the 1970s. He was responsible for drafting the Constitution of the Khmer Republic in 1974.

He fled the horrors of the Khmer Rouge and found refuge in France, where he became a professor of constitutional law and administrative law at faculty of law of the University of Toulouse.

Heng Vong Buncchat joined the Liberal Democratic Party of Sak Sutsakhan, an offshoot of Son Sann's Khmer People's National Liberation Front, and he directed their campaign during the general election of 1992-1993. After their defeat, Buncchat rallied the Cambodian People's Party and became depute minister of Higher Education.

In 1992, as poaching and tree-logging went wild in post-War Cambodia, Buncchat was jointly appointed by Hun Sen and Rannaridh in 1994 on the national permanent commission for coordinating privatization and the promotion of rubber plantations. Buncchat believed a forestry law would set up a tracking system to monitor logging, impose stiff penalties on offenders and create a fund to replant deforested areas, however, deforestation continued at a rapid rate during that time in Cambodia.

Along with Minister of Justice Chem Snguon, Bunchhat was one the main experts who drafted the Constitution of the Kingdom of Cambodia between June and August 1993, and functioned as the legal draftsman in drafting the laws and regulations for the Government of Cambodia, as Secretary of State for Justice and personal legal advisor to Hun Sen. However, he suddenly resigned from his office in February 1993 after joining the royalist party FUNCINPEC in December 1993.

He then returned to the Cambodian Bar as a solicitor and swore his new oath on October 16, 1995. That same year, he was involved in judicial proceedings against British national Gavin Scott, among rampant cases of pedophaelia in post-War Cambodia.

Following the political crisis in 1997, Heng Vong Bunnchat in hope of restoring the rule of law published a document entitled Legal frame of the Election of Members of the National Assembly in 1998 including international and constitutional provisions related to elections, the December 26, 1997 law on election of members to the National Assembly, the November 18, 1997 political parties law, and the April 8, 1998 law on the organization and functioning of the Constitutional Council, as well as a number of related historical and doctrinal references.

After in May 1996 receiving a grand from the Asian Development Bank for the revision of land legislation, Heng Vong Bunchhat penned the reform of land law in Cambodia in 1999 after intense negotiations, as he was himself embroiled in a land dispute with the Minister of Justice, Uk Vithun. In November 1999, as head of the Legal Reform Unit, Buncchat launched a monthly bulletin containing a transcript of all laws, decrees, sub-decrees and regulations approved during the past month, a move which was welcomed by human rights advocacy group who had been calling for more transparency and accessibility in the legal field:

Access to the knowledge of the texts on the rules and regulations in force is, in every country, the essential condition for the rule of law and the security of the juridical relationship.

— Heng Vong Buncchat

Heng Vong Bunchhat drafted the law on the Khmer Rouge Tribunal in collaboration with the United Nations . He was careful to protect the sovereignty of Cambodia and its constitution in the process: albeit recognizing the need for international judges, Buncchat insisted that the Court should be an extraordinary Chamber of the Supreme Court of Cambodia. After a breakdown in talks with the United Nations was due to a "misunderstanding", Buncchat urged the United Nations officials to return to the negotiating table, and was eventually successful.

In May 2009, amid accusations of corruptions against the Ministry of Justice that academy students had to pay bribes of between $20,000 and $150,000 to have seats in the judicial system after they graduate, Heng Vong Bunchhat denied the allegations.

Through a Royal Decree dated September 22,2018 signed by acting Head of State Say Chhum, Heng Vong Bunchhat was appointed as adviser to the government with the highest rank equivalent to the Deputy Prime Minister along with Nadi Tan and Ek Sam Ol.
