= Royal University of Law and Economics =

University in Phnom Penh, Cambodia

- សាកលវិទ្យាល័យភូមិន្ទនីតិសាស្ត្រ និងវិទ្យាសាស្ត្រសេដ្ឋកិច្ច (Khmer); Université royale de droit et des sciences économiques (French)
- Former names: National Institute of Law, Politics and Economics
- Type: National
- Established: 1949; 77 years ago
- Affiliations: Agence universitaire de la Francophonie; ASEAN University Network
- Rector: Dr. Luy Channa
- Academic staff: 1,438
- Students: 15,672 (2013–2014)
- Undergraduates: 14,015 (2013–2014)
- Postgraduates: 1,657 (2013–2014)
- Location: 93 Monivong Blvd, Phnom Penh, Cambodia
- Website: www.rule.edu.kh

The Royal University of Law and Economics (Note: Khmer: សាកលវិទ្យាល័យភូមិន្ទនីតិសាស្ត្រ និងវិទ្យាសាស្ត្រសេដ្ឋកិច្ច, ស.ភ.ន.វ.ស, UNGEGN: Sakâlôvĭtyéaloăy Phumĭnt Nitĕsastr nĭng Vĭtyéasastr Sédthâkĕchch, S.P.N.V.S, ALA-LC: Sākalavidyālăy Bhūmind Nītisāstr ning Vidyāsāstr Seṭṭhakicc, S.B.N.V.S [saːkalaʔʋitjiəlaj pʰuːmɨn niːtesah nɨŋ ʋitjiəsah seːtʰakəc]; lit. 'Royal University of Jurisprudence and Economic Sciences'; French: Université royale de droit et des sciences économiques) (RULE) is one of the oldest higher educational institutions in Cambodia.

RULE was established in 1949 as the National Institute of Law, Politics and Economics. (Note: Khmer: វិទ្យាស្ថានជាតិនីតិសាស្ត្រ នយោបាយ និងសេដ្ឋកិច្ច, UNGEGN: Vĭtyéasthan Chéatĕ Nitĕsastr, Nôyoŭbay nĭng Sédthâkĕchch, ALA-LC: Vidyāsthān Jāti Nītisāstr, Nayopāy ning Seṭṭhakicc, [ʋitjiəatʰaːn ciət niːtesah, nɔjoːɓaːj nɨŋ seːtʰakəc]; lit. 'National Institute of Jurisprudence, Politics and Economics'; French: Institut national de droit, politique et économie) In 2003, the institute was officially deemed a university.

== Background ==
RULE is the first higher education institution in Cambodia. It was founded in 1948 as the National Institute of Law, Politics and Economics. In 1957 the institute became the faculty by Royal Decree. In 2003 the Faculty of Law and Economics was reorganized as a university, under the name of Royal University of Law and Economics. Other disciplines of social and natural sciences, such as language and computer sciences have been added to the curriculum.

The university has four faculties, two graduate schools and one center, teaching law, economics and business.

== Staff and students ==
In 2003, there were 4,800 undergraduate students studying in the four faculties, among them were 1,478 female students. Newly established graduate schools accommodate 507 graduate students. There are 84 full-time and 112 visiting Cambodian lecturers and 70 foreign lecturers who give lectures under the academic exchange programmes.

== Academic programmes ==
The educational term/grade level system has been divided into semesters, with eight semesters in the period of four years for bachelor's degree programme.

== Undergraduate degree programmes ==
=== Faculty of Law ===
- Law (in Khmer)
- Law (in English)
- Law (in Trilingual: Khmer, English and French)
- Law in Japanese
- Law in Chinese and Khmer

=== Faculty of Public Administration ===
- Bachelor's in Public Administration
- Bachelor's in International Relations (English Program)

=== Faculty of Economics and Management ===
- Bachelor in Economics
- Bachelor of Business Administration
- Bachelor in Accounting
- Bachelor in Finance and Banking

=== Faculty of Information Economics ===
- Bachelor in Information Economics

== Graduate degree programmes ==
=== Graduate School of Law ===
- Master of Public Administration (MPA)
- Master in Private Law (MPL)
- Master in International Business Law and Corporate Counsel (MIB)

=== Graduate School of Economics and Management ===
- Master of Business Administration (MBA)
- Master of Business Administration in Finance (MBA-Finance)
- Master of Business Administration in Marketing (MBA-Marketing)
- Master in Tourism Management

== Notable alumni ==
- Veasna Chea Leth - activist and the first woman from Cambodia to graduate with a law degree.
- Heng Vong Bunchhat - former dean of the faculty until 1975

== See also ==
- List of universities in Cambodia
