= Veasna Chea Leth =

Cambodian lawyer

- Born: 1944 (age 81–82); Cambodia
- Citizenship: Cambodia
- Awards: BBC 100 Women

Veasna Chea Leth (born 1944) is a lawyer from Cambodia, who was the first female law student at the Royal University of Law and Economics. During her studies in the 1990s she lived in an underground space under the university due to the lack of female dormitories. During her work as a lawyer she raised awareness of the issues that Cambodian women face in accessing university education, due to a lack of appropriate accommodation. This led to the author Alan Lightman establishing the Harpswell Foundation to support women, of which she is an Honorary Board Member.

In 2018 she was nominated as one of the BBC's 100 Women.
