= Victoire Agbanrin-Elisha =

Beninese judge

Victoire Désirée Adétoro Agbanrin-Elisha (1944–2026) was Benin's first female prosecutor.

== Life ==
Victoire Agbanrin-Elisha became a judge at Cotonou's Court of First Instance in 1970. In the 1970s and 1980s, she had various spells as a counsellor on the Court of Appeal. From 1981 to 1986, she served as prosecutor. In 1988, she was appointed to be a Supreme Court judge, but retired later that year.

In 1989, Agbanrin-Elisha started a practice as advocate at the Cotonou Court of Appeal. In 2003, she was shortlisted for the post of Deputy Prosecutor at the International Criminal Court (ICC). In 2009, Benin nominated her as a candidate to be a judge at the ICC.
