= Claude Jorda =

French jurist and judge (born 1938)

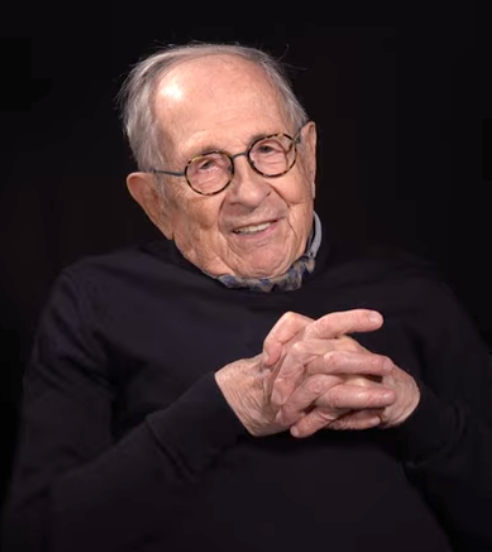
- In a 2026 interview

Judge of the International Criminal Court
- In office 11 March 2003 – 12 August 2007
- Nominated by: France
- Appointed by: Assembly of States Parties
- Succeeded by: Fumiko Saiga

President of the International Criminal Tribunal for the Former Yugoslavia
- In office 16 November 1999 – 17 February 2003
- Preceded by: Gabrielle Kirk McDonald
- Succeeded by: Theodor Meron

Judge at the International Criminal Tribunal for the former Yugoslavia
- In office 19 January 1994 – 11 March 2003
- Preceded by: Germain Le Foyer De Costil
- Succeeded by: Jean-Claude Antonetti

Personal details
- Born: 16 February 1938 (age 88) Bône, Algeria

Claude Jorda (born 16 February 1938, in Bône, Algeria) is a French jurist and former Judge at the International Criminal Court (2003–2007). He resigned "for reasons of permanent ill-health". Previously, he had been a Judge at the International Criminal Tribunal for the former Yugoslavia (ICTY) since January 1994.
