= Mary Shanthi Dairiam =

- Born: September 17, 1939 (age 86)
- Education: University of Madras; University of Sussex
- Occupation: United Nations official
- Known for: Human rights and women's rights advocate

Mary Shanthi Dairiam (born 17 September 1939) is a Malaysian human rights and women's rights advocate. She was the elected member from Malaysia to the Committee on the Elimination of All Forms of Discrimination against Women serving the Committee from 2005 - 2008.

== Education ==
Shanthi received a master's in English literature from the University of Madras in India in 1962. She received a master's in Gender and Development from the University of Sussex in the UK in 1991.

== Career ==
Although trained as an English teacher, Shanthi became interested in women's rights after volunteering with the Federation of Family Planning Associations (FFPA) in the late 1970s and seeing the inequalities women faced.

In the mid-1980s, she was involved in the lobbying for the enactment of the Domestic Violence Act (which was eventually passed by parliament in 1994). Since 2004, she has served on the UN's Gender Equality Task Force, and on the Committee on Elimination of Discrimination against Women. From 2004 to 2008, she was also a member of the UN's CEDAW committee, within which she was appointed Rapporteur in January 2007.

In 2010, Dairiam was appointed as one of three UN experts to lead an inquiry into the Israeli navy's response to the Gaza Freedom Flotilla that sought to break the blockade of the Gaza Strip.

Dairiam is the founder and a current director of International Women's Rights Action Watch - Asia Pacific, a global south feminist organisation devoted to the implementation of the CEDAW convention. She played a critical role in developing a process for women's rights NGOs globally to be heard when their governments are up for review on the government's progressive implementation of the convention, and constructive dialogue with the CEDAW Committee . This process facilitates the submission of shadow or alternative reports as well as the presence of women's rights groups at the CEDAW Sessions in Geneva to engage with the CEDAW Committee.

After a year, she set up IWRAW-Asia Pacific and is now regarded as an expert on CEDAW and provides technical services to several governments in the Asia Pacific region to build capacity for the implementation of CEDAW. Shanthi's book, A Woman's Right To Equality: The Promise Of CEDAW, was launched at the Beijing +20 conference in Bangkok, Thailand in 2014.
