= Joyce Aluoch =

Kenyan lawyer

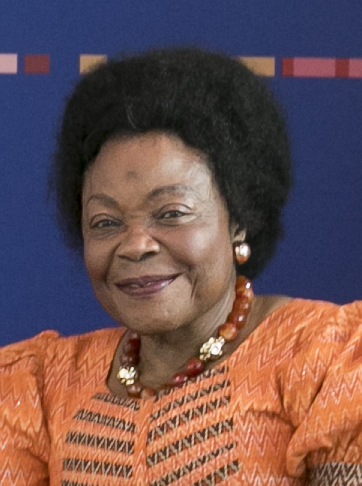
- Aluoch in 2017

First Vice-President of the International Criminal Court
- In office March 11, 2015 – March 10, 2018
- Appointed by: Judges of the ICC
- Preceded by: Sanji Mmasenono Monageng
- Succeeded by: Robert Fremr

Judge of the International Criminal Court
- In office 11 March 2009 – March 10, 2018
- Nominated by: Kenya
- Appointed by: Assembly of States Parties

Personal details
- Education: University of Nairobi; Kenya School of Law; Fletcher School of Law and Diplomacy at Tufts University

Joyce Aluoch (born 1947) is a Kenyan lawyer who served as Judge of the International Criminal Court from 2009 until 2018. She is a former judge of the High Court of Kenya. In addition to her career as a judge, she was the First Chairperson of the Committee of African Union Experts on the Rights and Welfare of the Child and the Vice-Chairperson of the United Nations Committee on the Rights of the Child from 2003 to 2009. She has also served as the inaugural head of the family division of the Kenyan High Court and a member of the Court of Appeal.

Aluoch has had a pivotal role in negotiations between the African Union and the Government of Sudan to ratify the African charter and secure the rights of children, pursued a fact-finding mission to war-torn northern Uganda on the effects of the war on children, and chaired a task-force aimed at handling sexual offences in Kenya through the implementation of the new Sexual Offences Act, 2006.

== Early life and education ==
Aluoch attended Butere Girls' School for her Ordinary Level School Certificate and obtained her Higher School Certificate from Limuru Girls’ School. She has a Law Degree from the University of Nairobi, a diploma in Legal Studies from the Kenya School of Law and a Master's Degree in International Relations in 2008 from the Global Master of Arts Program (GMAP) at The Fletcher School of Law and Diplomacy, Tufts University.

== Private career ==
In 1974, Aluoch was appointed as a District Magistrate II (Prof.) in the Kenyan Judiciary.

After the 1982 coup attempt, the then Kenyan President Daniel Toroitich arap Moi embarked on repressing perceived political dissidents. This was achieved by police brutality, arbitrary arrests and long detentions without trial, torture in the infamous Nyayo House basement cells and sham trials where the accused were sentenced to prison. Joyce Aluoch was a magistrate in several such trials convicting several political dissidents, key among them Onyango Oloo.

In 1993 Aluoch became a Judge of the High Court. Until her appointment as a Judge of Appeal in December 2007. She was the most Senior Judge of the High Court, handling civil, criminal, commercial and family law cases.

She established and served as Inaugural Head of the Family Division of the High Court and simplified litigation in Family Law matters in line with the principles of 'just, quick and cheap'.

== Judge of the International Criminal Court, 2009 ==
Aluoch was elected to the International Criminal Court in 2009 from the African group of states and her nine-year term expired in 2018. She served as the presiding judge of Trial Chamber IV, which heard the cases of Abdallah Banda and Saleh Jerbo.

As presiding judge of Pre-Trial Chamber I, Aluoch was assigned with the situations in Côte d'Ivoire, Democratic Republic of the Congo, the cases of Saif al-Islam Gaddafi (Libya), Ahmad al-Mahdi (Mali) and the 2010 Gaza flotilla raid. In a 2015 majority decision of the Pre-Trial Chamber I, she joined her fellow judge Cuno Tarfusser – with Judge Péter Kovács dissenting – in requesting ICC Prosecutor Fatou Bensouda to reconsider her decision not to investigate the Gaza flotilla raid on 31 May 2010. Between 2009 and 2016, she served as member of the trial chamber for the case of Jean-Pierre Bemba, the first case in which the ICC has found a high official directly responsible for the crimes of his subordinates, as well as the first to focus primarily on crimes of sexual violence committed in war.

In 2022 she was appointed deputy chairperson of the Judicial Reform Committee of South Sudan (JRC). The JRC was launched by the Government of South Sudan on 28 July 2022 to review laws, and to advise on judicial reforms and restructuring of the judiciary.

== Guiding career ==
Aluoch became a member of the Olave Baden-Powell Society (OB-PS) in 1991. She is also now the Kenya Girl Guides Association's National Trustee and a WAGGGS Honorary Associate.

In her role in the Kenya Girl Guides Association (KGGA), Aluoch helped establish the Peer Prevention Programme for Young People. This program is aimed at reducing the spread of the HIV virus through the education of girls and women and targets schools in Busia County, Mumias/Butere, Kakamega, Bungoma in the Western Province, Changamwe and Kisauni in the Coast Province; Nakuru municipality and Nakuru County in the Rift Valley. KGGA is as a key player in Kenya in the fight against HIV/AIDS.
