= Onesmus Kimweli Mutungi =

Kenyan judge (1940–2016)

Onesmus Kimweli Mutungi (1940–2016) was a Kenyan judge and law professor. He was the first Kenyan ever to get a doctoral degree in law. He was also the first dean of the University of Nairobi School of Law.
