= Akua Kuenyehia =

Ghanaian judge

First Vice-President of the International Criminal Court
- In office 11 March 2003 – 10 March 2009
- Appointed by: Judges of the ICC
- Preceded by: Office established
- Succeeded by: Fatoumata Dembélé Diarra

Judge of the International Criminal Court
- In office 11 March 2003 – 10 March 2015
- Nominated by: Ghana
- Appointed by: Assembly of States Parties

Personal details
- Born: 1947; 79 years ago Ghana

Akua Kuenyehia (born 1947) is a Ghanaian academic and lawyer who served as judge of the International Criminal Court (ICC) from 2003 to 2015. She also served as First Vice-president of the Court. She was one of the three female African judges at the ICC.

Kuenyehia represented Ghana on the United Nations' Convention on the Elimination of All Forms of Discrimination against Women (CEDAW) committee in 2003 and worked hard to contribute to its reputation and influence.

Kuenyehia is an Honorary Fellow of Somerville College.

She is a member of the Crimes Against Humanity Initiative Advisory Council, a project of the Whitney R. Harris World Law Institute at Washington University School of Law in St. Louis to establish the world's first treaty on the prevention and punishment of crimes against humanity.

== Education and early career ==
Kuenyehia was educated at Achimota School, University of Ghana and Somerville College, Oxford. She has spent most of her professional career teaching at the University of Ghana, as Dean of Law, and as a visiting professor at other institutions including Leiden University and Temple University. She is the President of Mountcrest University College, Ghana. The law faculty building at the University of Ghana, Legon, was named in joint honour of President John Atta Mills and Kuenyehia.

== Judge of the International Criminal Court, 2003–2015 ==
In March 2009, judges chose Kuenyehia as well as Anita Ušacka of Latvia for appeals positions. Three months later, both of them had to step down from an appeal in the case of Germain Katanga of the Democratic Republic of Congo, on trial for war crimes and crimes against humanity, because they had previously issued his arrest warrant.

== Personal life ==
Kuenyehia is married with three children.

== Books ==
- Women and Law in West Africa (2003). Accra, Ghana, WaLWA. ISBN 9988-7874-1-3
- With Butegwa, F., & S. Nduna (2000). Legal Rights Organizing for Women in Africa: A Trainer's Manual. Harare, Zimbabwe, WiLDAF. ISBN 0-7974-2082-7
- With Bowman, C. G. (2003). Women and Law in Sub-Saharan Africa. Accra, Ghana: Sedco. ISBN 9964-72-235-4.

== Recognition ==
In 2013, the University of Ghana named a newly constructed faculty of law building after Kuenyehia.
