= Maureen Harding Clark =

Judge at the International Criminal Court and the High Court of Ireland

The Hon. Ms. Justice Maureen Harding Clark

Judge of the Extraordinary Chambers in the Courts of Cambodia
- Incumbent
- Assumed office 12 June 2019
- Nominated by: António Guterres
- Appointed by: Norodom Sihamoni
- Preceded by: Agnieszka Klonowiecka-Milart

Judge of the High Court
- In office 11 December 2006 – 3 November 2014
- Nominated by: Government of Ireland
- Appointed by: Mary McAleese

Judge of the International Criminal Court
- In office 11 March 2003 – 10 December 2006
- Nominated by: Government of Ireland
- Appointed by: Assembly of States Parties

Judge at the International Criminal Tribunal for the former Yugoslavia
- In office 22 April 2001 – 9 February 2003
- Nominated by: Government of Ireland
- Appointed by: United Nations General Assembly

Personal details
- Born: 3 January 1946 (age 80) Edinburgh, Scotland
- Education: University of Lyon; University College Dublin; Trinity College Dublin; King's Inns

Maureen Harding Clark (born 3 January 1946) is an Irish judge who served as a Judge of the Extraordinary Chambers in the Courts of Cambodia since June 2019, a Judge of the High Court from 2006 to 2014, a Judge at the International Criminal Court from 2003 to 2006, and a Judge at the International Criminal Tribunal for the former Yugoslavia from 2001 to 2003.

== Early life and education ==
Clark was born to an Irish Catholic mother and a Scottish Presbyterian father in Edinburgh, Scotland. When she was two years old, her family moved to Malaysia where she and her sister attended an English school run by French nuns. She also learned Malay. The school they attended in Malaysia was located in Bukit Nanas, Kuala Lumpur. When she was twelve years old, the family moved to Ireland where she attended the Muckross Park College in Dublin. In 1964, Clark began studying at the University of Lyon where she obtained a diploma in French language.

In 1965, Clark returned to Ireland and studied law at the University College Dublin, where she met her husband. Following her graduation with a BCL degree, she and her husband settled in the United States, where they had two children. After an amicable separation, she and the children returned to Ireland, where she followed up her studies at Trinity College Dublin. While at the university, her lecturer was Mary Robinson, who later became President of Ireland. In 1975, she completed her studies and became a Barrister-at-Law at the Honourable Society of King's Inns.

In 2021, she was made an honorary fellow of Trinity College Dublin.

== Legal career ==
Following her graduation in 1975 Clark was a barrister in the South Eastern Circuit in a variety of cases. In 1985, she assumed as the State Prosecutor for Tipperary. In 1991, she became a Senior Counsel. The same year, she quit her job in Tipperary and became a prosecutor at the Central Criminal Court in Ireland. She was described as "tough-minded", and "If she was prosecuting, you knew you were prosecuted". She led the prosecution in the first money-laundering trial in Europe, as well as the first marital rape and male rape trials in Ireland. In 2004, she was appointed a member of the Irish Human Rights Commission.

== Judicial career ==
In June 2001, Clark was elected as one of the 27 so-called ad litem judges at the International Criminal Tribunal for the former Yugoslavia (ICTY) by the General Assembly of the United Nations. She was assigned to a trial concerning human rights violations. By March 2003, her chamber had sentenced Mladen Naletilić Tuta to 20 years' and Vinko Martinovic to 18 years' imprisonment.

In 2003, she was elected to a nine-year term as a judge of the International Criminal Court (ICC), where she was tasked with the organization of the trials and the establishment of a judicial infrastructure. On 10 December 2006, she resigned from her post at the International Criminal Court after being appointed a High Court judge in Ireland. Clark served in that capacity until 2014.

From 2009 to 2020, she was a Judicial Visitor at the Trinity College Dublin.
