= Hans-Peter Kaul =

German international law scholar, diplomat and lawyer

Second Vice-President of the International Criminal Court
- In office 11 March 2009 – 10 March 2012
- Appointed by: Judges of the ICC
- Preceded by: René Blattmann
- Succeeded by: Cuno Tarfusser

Judge of the International Criminal Court
- In office 11 March 2003 – 1 July 2014
- Nominated by: Germany
- Appointed by: Assembly of States Parties

Personal details
- Born: 25 July 1943 Glashütte, Germany
- Died: 21 July 2014 (aged 70)
- Education: Heidelberg University
- Profession: Lawyer

Hans-Peter Kaul (25 July 1943 – 21 July 2014) was a German international law scholar and former diplomat and lawyer. From 11 March 2003 until 1 July 2014, he served as Judge at the International Criminal Court in The Hague. At the ICC, Kaul was President of the Pre-Trial Division from 2004 until March 2009 and again in 2014, and he was the Court's Second Vice-President from 2009 to 2012. In 2014, he resigned from the ICC for health reasons but his condition became worse and he died on 21 July 2014.

== Early life and education ==
Kaul was born on 25 July 1943 in Glashütte, Saxony. He spent part of his childhood in Glashütte and Zwickau, Saxony, in East-Germany, then Soviet occupation zone. In 1952, he fled with his parents to West-Germany.

After his military duty from 1963 to 1967, reaching the rank of captain, he studied law at Heidelberg University, where he completed his First State Examination in 1971. He then attended the École Nationale d'Administration in Paris from 1972 to 1973. He passed his Second State Examination in Law (equivalent to admission to the bar in the US) in Heidelberg in 1975.

Kaul joined the Max Planck Institute for Comparative Public Law and International Law at Heidelberg from 1973 to 1975, as a research assistant to Prof. Dr. Hermann Mosler (who later was, from 1976 to 1985, judge at the International Court of Justice in The Hague). In 1974, Kaul attended The Hague Academy of International Law.

== Career ==
In 1975, Kaul entered the German diplomatic service. He served as Consul and Press Attaché at the German Embassy to Norway from 1977 to 1980. From 1980 to 1984, he worked for the Division for UN Affairs (Security Council, General Assembly) at the Federal Foreign Office in Bonn, Germany. He was sent then to Tel Aviv, Israel, where he served as Press Counsellor and Spokesman at the German Embassy from 1984 to 1986. Between 1986 and 1990, he served as Political Counsellor at the German Embassy to the United States, Washington. In 1990, back in Bonn, he was appointed Deputy Head of the Division for Near Eastern Affairs at the Federal Foreign Office. In 1993, he returned to the United States as First Counsellor for the Permanent Mission of the Federal Republic of Germany to the United Nations, New York, during Germany's non-permanent membership in the Security Council (1995/1996). From 1996 until 2002, he served as Head of the Division for International Law of the Federal Foreign Office in Bonn.

From 1996 to 2003, Kaul was Head of the German delegation in the negotiation process of the Rome Statute of the International Criminal Court. He played a key role in the establishment of the International Criminal Court. In 2002, he became Ambassador and Foreign Office Commissioner for the International Criminal Court.

Kaul was elected as the first German judge of the International Criminal Court in 2003, and then re-elected in 2006 for a second term of nine years. Judge Kaul was a member of the Pre-Trial Division, assigned to both Pre-Trial Chamber I and Pre-Trial Chamber II, dealing with the situations in Libya, Côte d'Ivoire, Uganda, the Democratic Republic of the Congo, Darfur (Sudan), the Central African Republic, Kenya and Mali.

== Activities ==
Judge Kaul published extensively on the topic of public international law in general, international criminal law and the crime of aggression in particular.

From 1997, Judge Kaul played a major role in international efforts to criminalize aggressive war-making, together with former US Nuremberg prosecutors Benjamin Ferencz (b. 1920) and Whitney R. Harris (1912–2010). It is widely recognized that without his leadership, the crime of aggression would not have been included in the list of international crimes set out in the Rome Statute of the ICC.

After a long professional life as a diplomat, international lawyer, and since 2003 as a judge of the International Criminal Court, Judge Kaul reaffirmed many times that aggressive war-making, the “supreme international crime” according to the Nuremberg Judgement, and the use of illegal armed force inevitably lead, time and again, to mass atrocities. Judge Kaul strongly believed that there can be no successful prevention of war crimes and crimes against humanity without the effective criminalization and prosecution of aggressive war-making.

On 3 June 2013, Judge Kaul was invited by German Foreign Minister Guido Westerwelle to take part in the depositing of the German instrument of ratification with regard to the Kampala amendments on the crime of aggression at the Office of Legal Affairs of the United Nations.

Judge Kaul was a member of the advisory board of the Global Institute for the Prevention of Aggression (from June 2012). He chaired the International Expert Advisory Council of the Founding Office: International Academy Nuremberg Principles (March 2011).

He was a member of the Presidency of the United Nations Association of Germany.

Judge Kaul gave over 130 speeches, lectures and interviews (print media, radio and television) on the International Criminal Court, international humanitarian law, international criminal law and the crime of aggression in Germany, Western and Eastern Europe, Russia, the United States, Brazil, Chile, Egypt, Iraq, Syria, Yemen, China, Japan, the Philippines, Thailand and Vietnam.

In May 2006, he was awarded the Integration Prize by the Foundation Apfelbaum, Cologne, and in November 2008, he received the Honorary Degree of Doctor of Laws, Faculty of Law of the University of Cologne.
