= René Blattmann =

Bolivian judge, lawyer and politician (born 1948)

Judge René Blattmann

Second Vice-President of the International Criminal Court
- In office 11 March 2006 – 10 March 2009
- Appointed by: Judges of the ICC
- Preceded by: Elizabeth Odio Benito
- Succeeded by: Hans-Peter Kaul

Judge of the International Criminal Court
- In office 11 March 2003 – 31 August 2012
- Nominated by: Bolivia
- Appointed by: Assembly of States Parties

Personal details
- Born: 28 January 1948 (age 78) La Paz, Bolivia
- Education: The Southwestern Legal Foundation – International Comparative Law Center (1980); Bolivian University, La Paz (1973); Association Internationale de Droit Comparé (1972); University of Basle (1972)
- Occupation: Judge, attorney-at-law, politician

René Oswaldo Blattmann Bauer (born 28 January 1948) is a Bolivian judge, lawyer and politician who is a judge of the International Criminal Court. Prior to his appointment to the ICC Blattmann served as Bolivia's minister for justice and human rights.

== Early life and education ==
Blattmann was born to a father of Swiss descent and studied law at the University of Basel between 1967 and 1971. After graduation, he taught at several universities in Bolivia and abroad.

== Political career ==
In 1993 Blattmann entered politics with the Revolutionary Nationalist Movement (MNR), serving as the Minister of Justice. He introduced several reforms with regard to human rights. In the presidential elections of 2002, he was the presidential candidate for the Movimiento Ciudadano para el Cambio (MCC). He campaigned for introducing the mechanism of the referendum inspired by the Swiss democracy in Bolivian politics, but was not elected.

== Juridical career ==
Judge Blattmann was elected to the ICC from the Latin American and Caribbean group of states as a member of List B, the list of judges whose experience is in the field of human rights law and international law. He was elected for a six-year term in 2003, and although that term expired in 2009 he remained in office for the duration of the trial of Thomas Lubanga. He was assigned to the court's trial division and sat as a member of Trial Chamber I. Blattman's term ended in 2012.

== Personal life ==
René is the grandson of Karl Blattmann, a Swiss immigrant to Cachuela Esperanza, Bolivia. He is married to Marianne Schassner and has three children. He holds dual citizenship of Bolivia and Switzerland.

== Awards ==
- 1995 Emblema de Oro from the Bolivian police
- 1998 Honorary doctorate from the University of Basel
- 2001 Carl Bertelsmann Prize for the transformation towards democracy during his term as a Minister of Justice. Together with Ana Maria Romero.
