= Philippe Kirsch =

Canadian judge

Philippe Kirsch OC KC
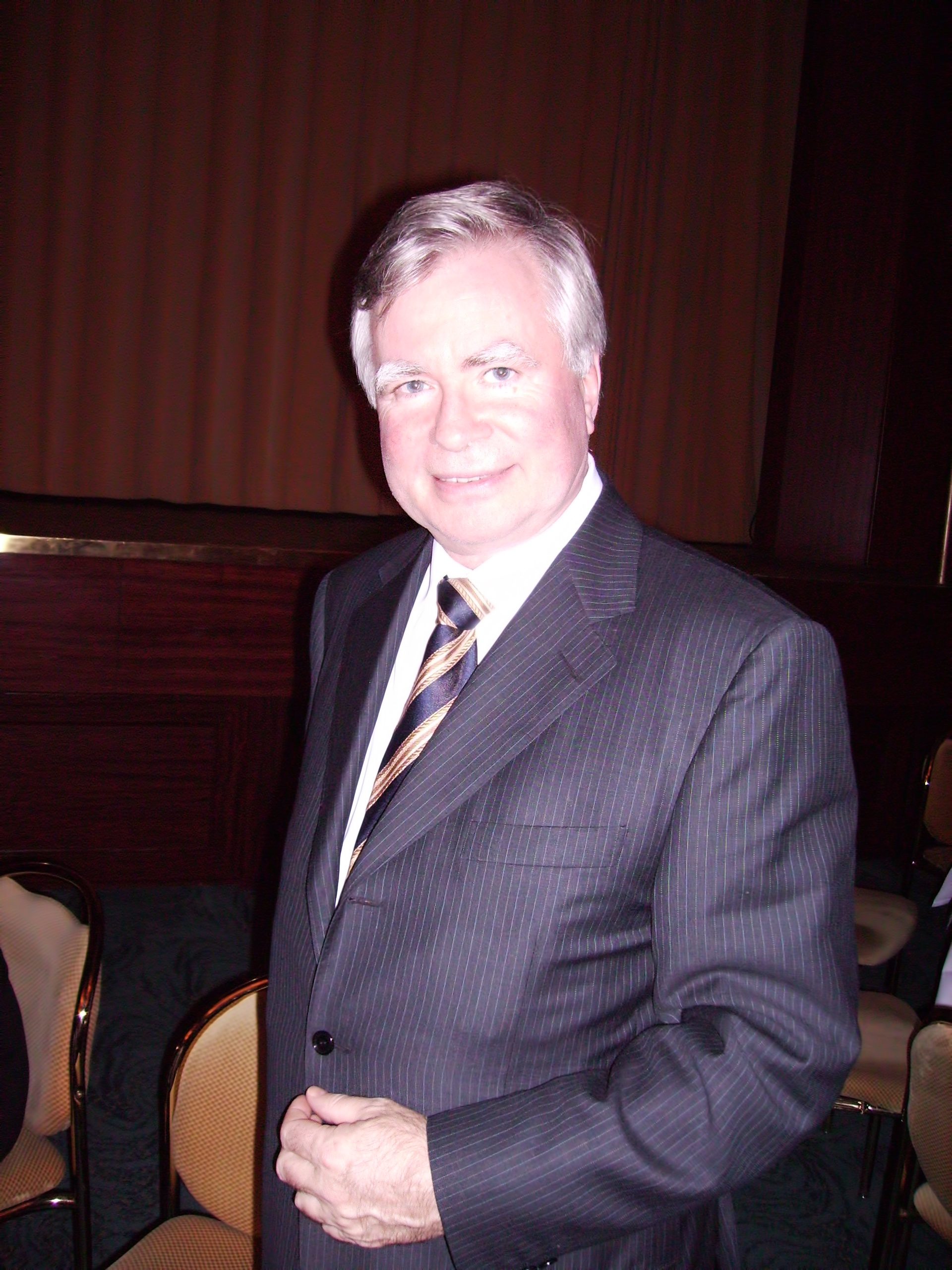

1st President of the International Criminal Court
- In office March 11, 2003 – March 10, 2009
- Appointed by: Judges of the ICC
- Preceded by: Office established
- Succeeded by: Song Sang-hyun

Judge of the International Criminal Court
- In office March 11, 2003 – March 10, 2009
- Nominated by: Canada
- Appointed by: Assembly of States Parties

Personal details
- Born: April 1, 1947 (age 79) Namur, Belgium
- Education: Université de Montréal
- Occupation: lawyer
- Profession: lawyer

Philippe Kirsch, OC KC (born April 1, 1947) is a Canadian lawyer who served as a judge of the International Criminal Court from 2003 to 2009 and was the Court's first president.

== Biography ==
Kirsch was born in Belgium in 1947 and arrived in Canada in 1961. Kirsch holds a Bachelor of Civil Law and an LL.M. degree from the Université de Montréal (1972).

Kirsch, who joined the Department of External Affairs of Canada in 1972, has held a number of positions in the Department, including Assistant Deputy Minister for Legal, Consular and Passport Affairs, Ottawa (1994–1996); and Director General, Bureau of Legal Affairs, Ottawa (1992–1994). He was Deputy Permanent Representative of Canada to the United Nations (1988–1992), Deputy Representative to the Security Council (1989–1990) and Canada's ambassador to the Kingdom of Sweden.

Kirsch is member of the Bar of the Province of Quebec and of the Canadian Council on International Law and was appointed Queen's Counsel in 1988.

Kirsch served as Chairman of the Drafting Committee of the International Conference on the Problem of War Victims (1993), Chairman of the preparatory and subsequent Intergovernmental Working Groups of Government Experts on the Protection of War Victims (1993, 1995), and Chairman of the Drafting Committee at the 26th and 27th International Conferences of the Red Cross and the Red Crescent (1995, 1999). He was Chairman of the Canadian National Committee on Humanitarian Law (1998–1999) and member of the Group of International Advisers to the International Committee of the Red Cross (2000–2003).

He has extensive experience in the development of international criminal law with regard to issues such as various acts of terrorism; suppression of unlawful acts against the safety of maritime navigation; unlawful acts of violence at airports serving international civil aviation; safety and security of UN and associated personnel and the taking of hostages.

His appointment as judge came after his extensive experience in the process of the establishment of the International Criminal Court, international humanitarian law and international criminal law.

In 1998 Kirsch served as Chairman of the Committee of the Whole of the Diplomatic Conference of Plenipotentiaries on the Establishment of an International Criminal Court. He was also Chairman of the Preparatory Commission for the International Criminal Court (1999 to 2002).

== Honours ==
In 2009, he was made an Officer of the Order of Canada "for his contributions to international criminal law, notably as president of the International Criminal Court in The Hague".
