= Sylvia Steiner =

Brazilian judge (born 1953)

Judge of the International Criminal Court
- In office 11 March 2003 – 6 July 2016
- Nominated by: Brazil
- Appointed by: Assembly of States Parties

Personal details
- Born: 19 January 1953 (age 73) São Paulo, Brazil
- Education: University of São Paulo

Sylvia Helena de Figueiredo Steiner (born 19 January 1953) is a Brazilian judge who was a member of the International Criminal Court from 2003 to 2016.

== Career ==
Steiner graduated from the Law School of University of São Paulo and studied later at the University of Brasília. She acted as Federal Public Prosecutor from 1982 to 1995 in São Paulo. In 1995, she was appointed as a judge of the Tribunal Regional Federal da 3ª Região, a federal court headquartered at São Paulo.

Steiner was a member of the Brazilian delegation to the Preparatory Commission of the International Criminal Court from 1999 to 2002. She was also a member of the Official Working Group on the Implementation of the Rome Statute in 2003, in Brazil.

== Judge of the International Criminal Court, 2003–2016 ==
Between 2005 and 2016, Steiner served as the presiding judge of the trial chamber for the case of Jean-Pierre Bemba, the first case in which the ICC has found a high official directly responsible for the crimes of his subordinates, as well as the first to focus primarily on crimes of sexual violence committed in war. She left the court in 2016, and the Bemba judgement was overturned on appeal and gave rise to a compensation claim on the part of the accused on the basis that trial mismanagement had contributed to a miscarriage of justice.

== Other activities ==
- Brazilian Institute for Criminal Sciences (IBCCRIM), Founding Associate Member
- Brazilian Criminal Sciences Journal, Deputy Director
- Brazilian Judges for Democracy Association, Member
- Brazilian Section of the International Commission of Jurists, Member of the Executive Council

== Publications ==
- A convenção americana sobre direitos humanos e sua integração ao processo penal brasileiro. (2000) São Paulo, Editora Revista dos Tribunais. ISBN 85-203-1967-X - in Portuguese
