= Erkki Kourula =

Finnish judge

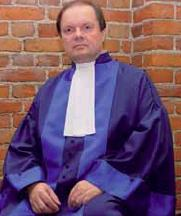

Judge of the International Criminal Court
- In office 11 March 2003 – 10 March 2015
- Nominated by: Finland
- Appointed by: Assembly of States Parties

Personal details
- Born: 12 June 1948 (age 78) Lappee, Finland
- Education: University of Helsinki; University of Oxford

Erkki Antero Kourula (born 12 June 1948) is a Finnish judge who served in the International Criminal Court (ICC).

Kourula was elected for an initial term of three years in the first election of 2003, then reelected in 2006 for nine more years. He was chosen from List B, a list of judges with specific experience and knowledge of international law, worked in the appeals division and was the first Finn elected to the court.

Kourula holds a degree in law from the University of Helsinki and a doctorate in international law from the University of Oxford. In 1979, he was appointed as a judge of first instance in Finland. Between 1982 and 1983, he was a professor of international law at the University of Lapland. He later worked in various roles within the Finnish government, including director-general of legal affairs in the Ministry of Legal Affairs.

Kourula was ambassador to the Council of Europe and legal advisor at the Permanent Mission of Finland to the United Nations, where he monitored the establishment of international tribunals to investigate allegations of war crimes in Rwanda and the former Yugoslavia. He was also the head of the Finnish delegation to the Rome Conference on the Establishment of an International Criminal Court, where the ICC's formation was initially approved.

Since 2019, Kourula is vice-president of the OSCE's Court of Conciliation and Arbitration. He and his wife Pirkko have two children. He speaks Finnish, English, French, Russian, Swedish and German.
