= Fatoumata Dembélé Diarra =

Malian lawyer and judge (born 1949)

First Vice-President of the International Criminal Court
- In office 11 March 2009 – 10 March 2012
- Appointed by: Judges of the ICC
- Preceded by: Akua Kuenyehia
- Succeeded by: Sanji Mmasenono Monageng

Judge of the International Criminal Court
- In office 11 March 2003 – 31 May 2014
- Nominated by: Mali
- Appointed by: Assembly of States Parties

Judge of the International Criminal Tribunal for the former Yugoslavia
- In office 6 September 2001 – 11 March 2003

Personal details
- Born: 15 February 1949 Koulikoro, French West Africa

Fatoumata Dembélé Diarra (born 15 February 1949 in Koulikoro) is a Malian lawyer and judge. She was a judge of the International Criminal Tribunal for the former Yugoslavia (ICTY) and of the International Criminal Court (ICC).

== Career ==
Dembélé Diarra received a Bachelor of Laws from Dakar University in Senegal and a Master of Laws from the Mali École Nationale d’Administration (national college of public administration). She is also a graduate of the École Nationale de la Magistrature in Paris.

In Mali, she has been an examining magistrate, the president of the country's Assize Court, the president of the Criminal Chamber of the Bamako Appeals Court, and the national director of the Justice Department of Mali.

Prior to being elected a judge of the ICC, Dembélé Diarra was a judge of the ICTY. In 2003, she was elected as one of the first judges of the ICC. Diarra's term expired in 2012, but she remained in office until 2014 pursuant to Article 36 (10) of the Rome Statute to complete the trial and sentencing of Germain Katanga. In 2009, Dembélé Diarra was elected First Vice-President of the ICC under president Sang-Hyun Song. She was a member of the ICC's Trial Division.

Fatoumata Dembélé Diarra was at the heart of the Malian Democratic Movement that opposed the monolithic and dictatorial system of General Moussa Traoré in 1991. At the time of the Sovereign National Lecture of Mali in 1991, Madame Fatoumata Dembélé Diarra was an expert member of the group of people who contributed to the compilation of fundamental texts of a democratic Mali. She was elected Judge of the International Criminal Court in 2003.

She is the founding president of the Office on Relief for Impoverished Women and Children and Observation of the Rights of Children and Women (ODEF). Through these two structures, she has supported hundreds of women and of children in distress. She is at ease in her work since she is a magistrate and knows all the intricacies of Malian justice. Her legal office has given many women free legal assistance to defend their rights. Madame Diarra was Vice President of the International Federation of Women in Legal Careers (FIFCJ) from 1994 to 1997. She has also been vice president of the Federation of African Lawyers since March 1995 and has attended several courses on the legal position of women and children in Mali and in Africa. She has published many articles, on topics including Rights and Exclusion, Legal Assistance, Circumcision and Positive Malian Rights, and Violence against Women and the Obstacles to the Malian Women Exercising their Rights. Dembélé Diarra was a member of the national commission on trafficking in children and international adoption, a commission that has done much to protect Malian children against the networks of organized crimes that, ultimately, sell them to the coffee and cocoa plantations in Ivory Coast.
