= Song Sang-hyun =

South Korean lawyer (born 1941)

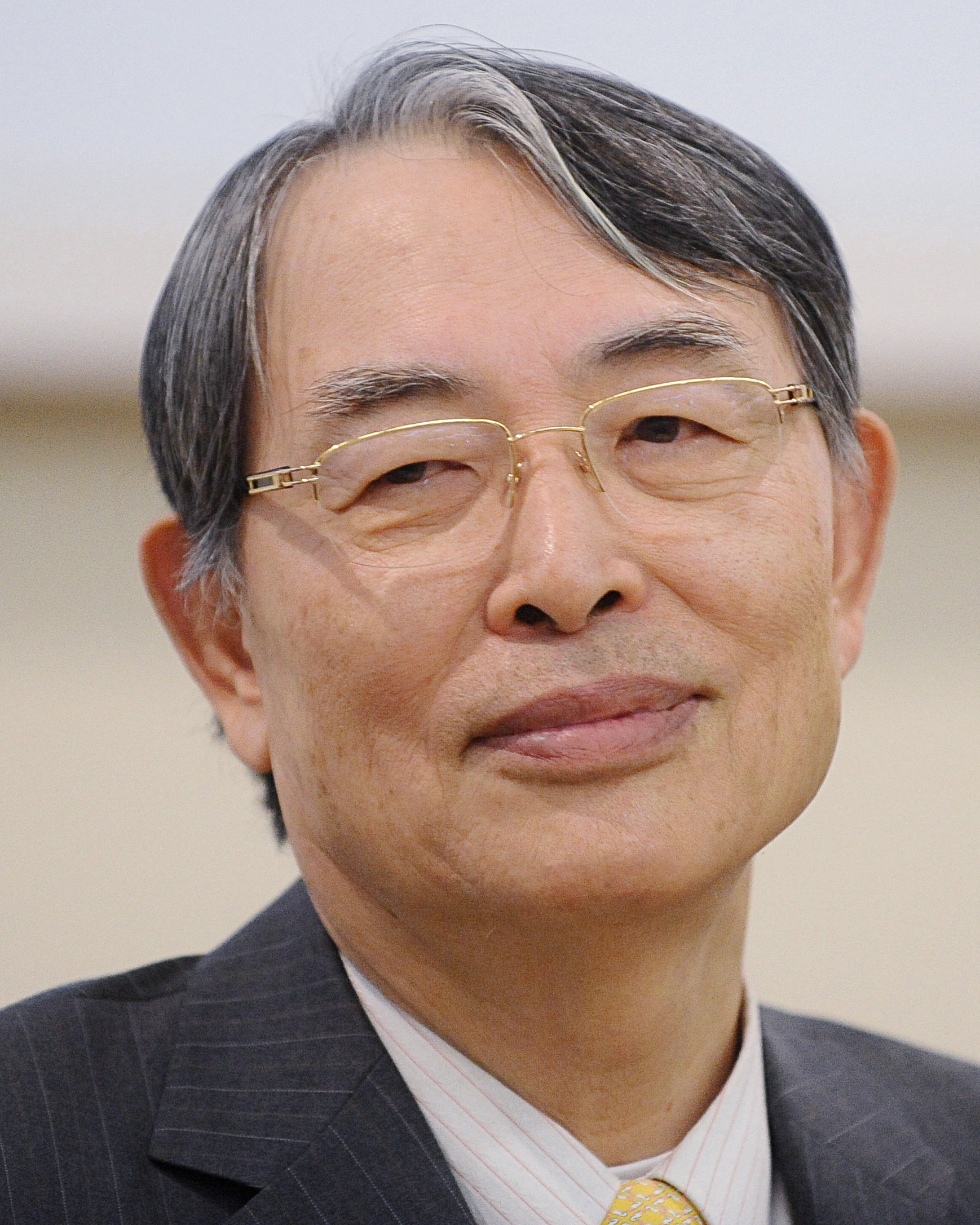

2nd President of the International Criminal Court
- In office 11 March 2009 – 10 March 2015
- Appointed by: Judges of the ICC
- Preceded by: Philippe Kirsch
- Succeeded by: Silvia Fernández de Gurmendi

Judge of the International Criminal Court
- In office 11 March 2003 – 10 March 2015
- Nominated by: South Korea
- Appointed by: Assembly of States Parties

Personal details
- Born: 21 December 1941 (age 84) Keijō, Keiki-dō, Korea, Empire of Japan
- Education: Seoul National University (LLB); Tulane University; Wolfson College, Cambridge; Cornell University (JSD)

Korean name
- Hangul: 송상현
- Hanja: 宋相現
- RR: Song Sanghyeon
- MR: Song Sanghyŏn

Art name
- Hangul: 심당
- Hanja: 心堂
- RR: Simdang
- MR: Simdang

Song Sang-hyun (Korean: 송상현; born 21 December 1941) is a South Korean lawyer and former President of the International Criminal Court (ICC).

== Biography ==
Song attended Seoul National University Law School, graduating with an LL.B. in 1963. He attended Tulane University Law School as a Fulbright Fellow, then obtained a Diploma in Comparative Legal Studies from the University of Cambridge and a J.S.D. from Cornell Law School.

He has lectured Melbourne Law School, Harvard Law School, New York University and Seoul National University Law School.

In February 2003 he was elected to the first-ever bench of ICC judges, for a three-year term. He took office on 11 March 2003 and was assigned to the Appeals Division. He was re-elected to the court in 2006, for a term of nine years. On 11 March 2009, he was elected President of the court.

He has been awarded Cornell University's Distinguished Alumni Medal, the Korean Federal Bar Association's Legal Culture Award, and the National Decoration of Moran Order from the Korean Government.

== Lectures ==
- The International Criminal Court at a Glance in the Lecture Series of the United Nations Audiovisual Library of International Law
- The International Criminal Court: Maintaining Judicial Independence in a Political World in the Lecture Series of the United Nations Audiovisual Library of International Law
- Participation of Victims at the International Criminal Court in the Lecture Series of the United Nations Audiovisual Library of International Law
