= Georghios Pikis =

Cypriot judge (1939–2026)

- Γιώργος Πίκης

Judge of the International Criminal Court
- In office 11 March 2003 – 10 March 2009
- Nominated by: Cyprus
- Appointed by: Assembly of States Parties

President of the Supreme Court of Cyprus
- In office 1995–2004

Personal details
- Born: 22 January 1939 Larnaca, British Cyprus
- Died: 29 January 2026 (aged 87)

Georghios Pikis (Greek: Γιώργος Πίκης; 22 January 1939 – 29 January 2026) was a Cypriot judge who was a member of the International Criminal Court. He was President of the Supreme Court of Cyprus from 1995 to 2004, and he also served as an ad hoc judge of the European Court of Human Rights and as a member of the United Nations Committee against Torture.

== Life and career ==
Pikis was born in Larnaca on 22 January 1939. He was elected to the International Criminal Court in 2003 for a six-year term, and he was assigned to the Appeals Division.

Pikis died on 29 January 2026, at the age of 87.
