= Anita Ušacka =

Latvian judge

Judge of the International Criminal Court Appeals Division
- In office 11 March 2003 – 10 March 2015
- Nominated by: Latvia
- Appointed by: Assembly of States Parties

Judge of the Constitutional Court of the Republic of Latvia
- In office 1996–2004

Personal details
- Born: Anita Ušacka; 26 April 1952 (age 74) Riga, Latvia
- Education: University of Latvia; Moscow State University
- Profession: Jurist

Anita Ušacka (born 26 April 1952) is a Latvian and international judge and legal academic. She has been a judge of the Constitutional Court of the Republic of Latvia and of the Trial and Appeals Divisions of the International Criminal Court (ICC). She was president of the Appeals Division of the International Criminal Court in 2011/2012. She retired in 2015.

== Early life and education ==
Ušacka was born on 26 April 1952 in Riga, Latvia, the only daughter of Arturs Ušackis and Anna Krontāle. She had two elder brothers, Ivars (born 1944) and Juris (born 1948). Ušacka has a son, Aleksejs Ušackis, born on 13 December 1980.

Ušacka spent her childhood in Riga, Latvia, where she attended primary and secondary schools. She began university studies in 1970, at the Faculty of Law of the University of Latvia, specializing in legal sciences. She completed the degree in 1975. Ušacka later attended the Faculty of Law of Moscow State University, where she received a PhD in law (Candidate in Legal Sciences) in 1980. Ušacka's PhD thesis, which she defended in January that year, concerned legal aspects of the administration of industry in Latvia.

In 1991, Ušacka studied human rights at the International Institute of Human Rights in Strasbourg, France. In 1993 and 1994, she spent a year at the University of Notre Dame studying and conducting research on comparative law and human rights. During her tenure at this university, she created the first course on human rights for non-lawyers and on comparative law for the faculty. Following receipt of a fellowship to study comparative criminal law, she spent six months as a researcher at the Max Planck Institute for Foreign and International Criminal Law in Freiburg, Germany, in 1994.

In 2006, Ušacka was awarded an honorary Doctor of Laws degree from Lewis and Clark Law School in the United States, where she was the keynote speaker at their 2006 commencement. In her commencement address, she emphasized the importance of establishing a global system on the rule of law and for the protection of human rights. In 2015, she was awarded the distinction of Honorary Professor in Law of the Universidad San Ignacio de Loyola in Lima, Peru. At the same time, in recognition of her distinguished career as an international lawyer, she was awarded a diploma of the Interamerican Academy of International and Comparative Law as an academic and member of honor in Lima, Peru. In 2019, she was awarded an honorary Doctor of Laws degree from the East European University in Tbilisi, Georgia.

Ušacka is married to Peter Wilkitzki.

== Career ==
Starting in 1975, after graduating from the University of Latvia, Ušacka worked as a legal academic. She began her academic career as an assistant at the University of Latvia Department for Introduction to General Law, but was successively promoted to main lecturer (1980), reader (1982), head of department (1989), Doctor of Sciences (Dr. iur) (1992) and academic title of docent (1993). She became an associate professor of the Riga Graduate School of Law in 1999 and a full professor at the University of Latvia in 2002. Later, Ušacka's academic career also included visiting professorships in 1999 at the Robert Schuman University (Strasbourg) lecturing on constitutional development in Latvia and human rights, and in 2002 and 2003 at the Lewis and Clark Law School where she taught comparative constitutional law.

In 1993, two years after the Republic of Latvia restored its independence from the USSR, the UNICEF Latvian National Committee (LNC) was established. Between 1994 and 1996, Ušacka was the executive director of the Latvian branch of UNICEF, where she focused on children's rights issues in both a national and international context and assessed Latvia's compliance with the Convention on the Rights of the Child.

By June 1994, the Latvian parliament, the Saeima, had passed amendments to the law "On Judicial Power" which established Latvia's first Constitutional Court. In 1996, upon the proposal of the Saeima deputies, Ušacka was elected to serve for a ten-year term as one of the first of six judges on the Constitutional Court of the Republic of Latvia.

Between 1998 and 2001, Ušacka was also the director of a cooperation program between the Northwestern School of Law of Lewis & Clark College (US) and the Faculty of Law of the University of Latvia. Together with a counterpart from Lewis & Clark, Ušacka authored the original grant proposal, which allowed the program to be funded by a three-year, $120,000 grant from the Bureau of Educational and Cultural Affairs of the United States Information Agency. In 2002, Ušacka was nominated by the Republic of Latvia as a judicial candidate in elections for the newly established International Criminal Court, located in The Hague, The Netherlands. Ušacka was one of eighteen judges, from a total of 43 candidates, elected in February 2003 by the Assembly of States Parties to the first bench of the ICC. She was one of seven women and the only judge elected from the Eastern Europe group. She was sworn in at the inaugural session of the court on March 11, 2003.

After this first election of judges to the ICC, the president of the Assembly of States Parties drew lots to assign the eighteen judges to terms of three, six or nine years. Only the judges who received terms of three years were eligible for re-election. Ušacka, having received a three-year term, was therefore eligible for re-election, and was subsequently re-elected in 2006 (with the highest number of votes, 77 from 100). Her non-renewable nine-year term expired in 2015.

Upon their inauguration to the ICC in 2003, the ICC judges were assigned to judicial divisions. During her first term, Ušacka was assigned to the Trial Division. However, from 2007 to 2009, she was temporarily attached to Pre-Trial Chamber I, which presided over the second ever confirmation of charges hearing at the ICC in the case of the Prosecutor v. Germain Katanga and Mathieu Ngudjolo Chui. During the period of her temporary attachment to Pre-Trial Chamber I, this Chamber was also the first of the ICC to issue a warrant of arrest for a sitting head of state, in the case of the Prosecutor v. Omar Al Bashir. In March 2009, Ušacka was reassigned by the plenary of judges to the Appeals Division where she served for six years. From April 2011 to March 2012, she has been the Appeals Division's president. During her whole tenure as an ICC judge, Ušacka issued several strong and much noticerd dissenting opinions, namely in the cases Lubanga (https://www.icc-cpi.int/RelatedRecords/CR2013_04193.PDF), see pages 17–22, Nourain and Jamus (https://www.icc-cpi.int/RelatedRecords/CR2012_06628.PDF), Libya (https://www.icc-cpi.int/RelatedRecords/CR2014_06758.PDF), Kenya-Ruto (https://www.icc-cpi.int/RelatedRecords/CR2013_07732.PDF), Kenya-Kenyatta (https://www.icc-cpi.int/CourtRecords/CR2011_16047.PDF), Lubanga (https://www.icc-cpi.int/RelatedRecords/CR2014_09850.PDF), and Al-Bashir (https://www.icc-cpi.int/CourtRecords/CR2009_01517.PDF, after page 95)

== Activities ==
Ušacka has lectured and published extensively in various fields of law, including public law and administration, international and comparative law, international criminal law and human rights, see in particular the following publications:

1. "The International Criminal Court in Action: Challenges in Fighting Impunity", IUS NOVUM, no. 1 (2014), pp. 11–45.
2. "Promises Fulfilled? Some Reflections on the International Criminal Court in Its First Decade", Criminal Law Forum, vol. 22, no. 4 (2011), pp. 473–492.
3. "Building the International Criminal Court", Pacific McGeorge Global Business & Development Law Journal, vol. 23, no. 2 (2011), pp. 225–242.
4. "Constitutionalism and human rights at the International Criminal Court" in the book "Judges as Guardians of Constitutionalism and Human Rights", edited by Martin Scheinin, Helle Krunke and Marina Aksenova, Edward Elgar publishing, 2016, 281–305.
5. "The International Criminal Court and National Criminal Law", The Systematic of Criminal Law, Materials of the 2nd Russian congress on Criminal Law, Chief Editor Professor V.S. Komisarov, 2007,
6. Starptautiskās Krimināltiesas izaicinājums nesodāmība un šīs tiesas ietekme uz valstu ārpolitiku, Likums un Tiesības, 8. sējums, nr. 1 (77), Janvāris, 2006,
7. "Independence of the Judicial Power in Latvia. Monitoring the EU Accession Process: Independence of the Judicial Power", The Open Society Institute, 2001, 67–107. (Tiesu varas neatkarība Latvijā/ Pirmsiestāšanās procesa ES monitorings: Tiesu varas neatkarība. Ziņojums. Latvija . 2001. Atvērtās Sabiedrības Institūts, 2001, pp. 67–107),
8. "Where do we stand in the fights for accountability and against impunity for international crimes?", Lecture on International Nuremberg Principles Academy Forum, 2017, not published,
9. Международный уголовный cуд, Часть II – Судебн ый процесс, No 4(12), 2014, суд. 53,
10. Международный уголовный суд, принцип комплементарности и глобализация уголовного права // Научные основы уголовного права и процессы глобализации: Материалы V Российского конгресса уголовного права Архивная копия от 4 марта 2016 на Wayback Machine (27-28 мая 2010 года). – Москва: Проспект, 2010. С. 217–222,
11. Международный уголовный суд и право на справедливое судебное разбирательство // Сравнительное конституционное обозрение, 2009. No. 1 (68). С. 117–130,
12. Международный уголовный суд и право на справедливое судебное разбирательство // Международное уголовное правосудие / Под ред. Г. И. Богуша, Е. Н. Трикоз. М.: Институт права и публичной политики, 2009. С. 275–294,
13. Очерк деятельности Международного уголовного суда // Международный уголовный суд: проблемы, дискуссии, поиск решений / Под ред. Г.И. Богуша, Е.Н. Трикоз. М.: Европейская комиссия, 2008. С. 32–40,
14. Международный уголовный суд и национальное уголовное право // Системность в уголовном праве Материалы II Российского конгресса уголовного права,(31 мая - 1 июня 2007). – Москва, 2007. (недоступная ссылка) С. 423–426,
15. Режим дополнительности Международного уголовного суда // Международное право - International Law. 2007. No.1(29). С. 5-40,
16. Роль конституционного суда в защите избирательных прав: пример Латвии // Сравнительное конституционное обозрение, 2005. No. 1 (50). С. 83–85.

Since 1997, Ušacka has been an active member of the International Association of Women Judges, which also supported her candidature for the International Criminal Court. She has several times served as a panelist at IAWJ conferences, including, for example, in 1998, when she delivered a speech at the Conference of the International Women Judges Organisation in Ottawa, Canada entitled "The Child as a Witness, its Legal Status in Latvian Legislature". In May 2006, she chaired a panel at the Association's 8th Biennial Conference in Sydney, Australia which was organized on the topic of "An Independent Judiciary: Culture, Religion, Gender, Politics". Since 2004, Ušacka has been a member of the European Group of Public Law. In the past, she has been a frequent attendee at conferences organized by the Center of Public Law, in Athens, Greece. She participated in and attended numerous conferences on international criminal law, including "The Legacy of the International Criminal Tribunal for the former Yugoslavia and the Nuremberg Principles" in May 2017 in Nuremberg, Germany, the "50th Anniversary Celebration of Max Planck Institute for Foreign and International Criminal Law, Freiburg i. Br., Conference on Terrorism and Criminal Policy, in July 2016, and the Latvian Constitutional Court's Conference on "Judicial Activism of a Constitutional Court in a Democratic State", in Riga 2016. From 1996 to 2004 she was a member of the Council of Europe Venice Commission's Sub-Commission on Constitutional Justice. Ušacka is a member of the editorial board of the periodical "International Justice" and of the Scientific Council of Ius Novum, Lazarski University, Warsaw, Poland.
