= Mauro Politi =

Italian jurist

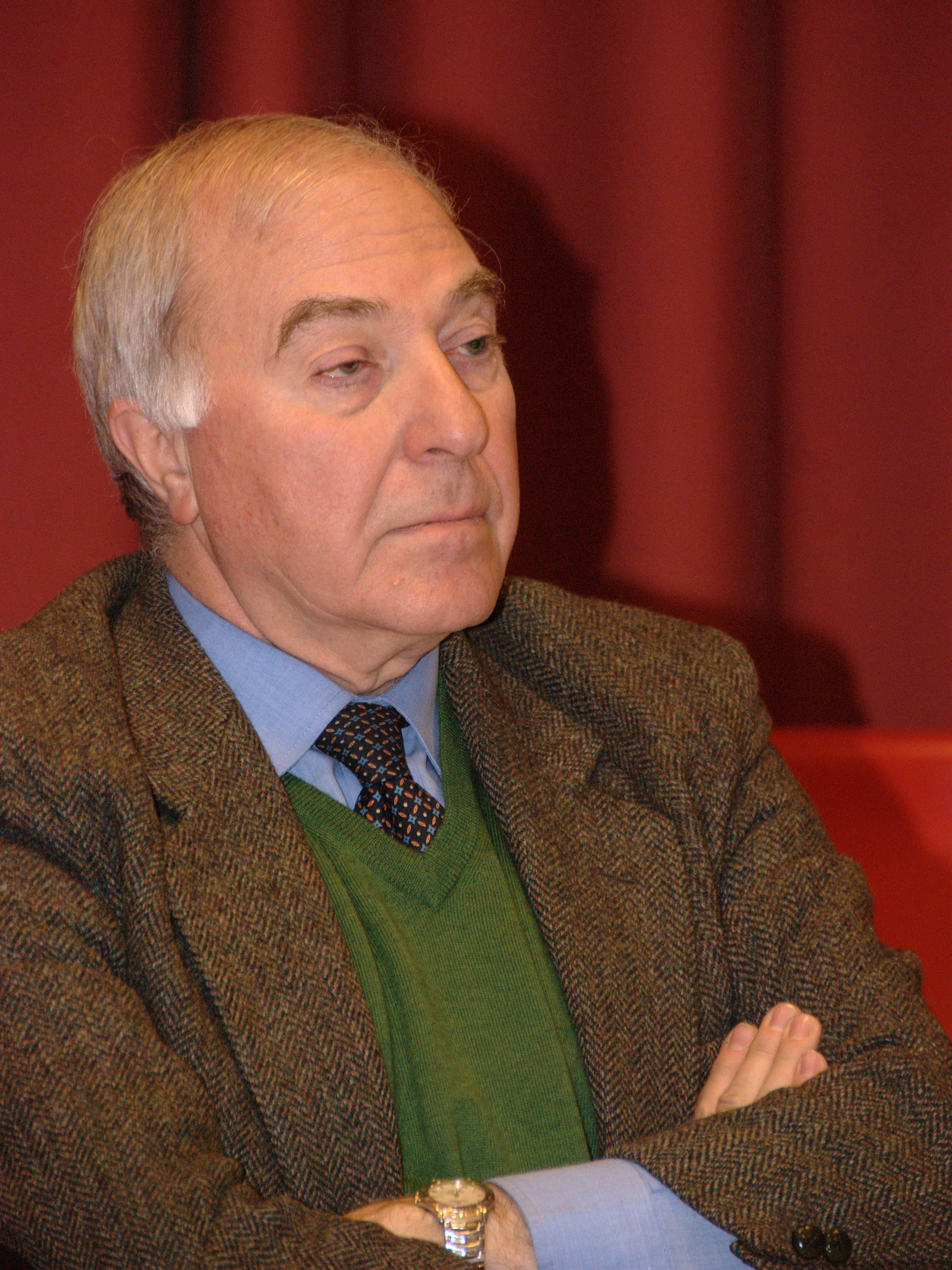

Judge of the International Criminal Court
- In office 11 March 2003 – 10 March 2009
- Nominated by: Italy
- Appointed by: Assembly of States Parties

Personal details
- Born: 13 September 1944 (age 80); Fabrica di Roma, Italy

Mauro Politi (born 13 September 1944) is an Italian jurist who served as a judge of the International Criminal Court from 2003 to 2009.
