= 2020 International Criminal Court judges election =

- 18–23 December 2020

6 of 18 seats on the International Criminal Court
- Outgoing judges (United Kingdom) Howard Morrison (Czech Republic) Robert Fremr (Nigeria) Chile Eboe-Osuji (Dominican Republic) Olga Venecia Herrera Carbuccia (Philippines) Raul Cano Pangalangan (Trinidad and Tobago) Geoffrey A. Henderson Elected judges (United Kingdom) Joanna Korner (Georgia (country)) Gocha Lordkipanidze (Sierra Leone) Miatta Maria Samba (Mexico) María del Socorro Flores Liera (Costa Rica) Sergio Gerardo Ugalde Godínez (Trinidad and Tobago) Althea Violet Alexis-Windsor

Six judges of the International Criminal Court were elected during the resumption of the 19th session of the Assembly of States Parties to the Rome Statute of the International Criminal Court held from 18 to 23 December 2020 in New York. The judges were elected for terms of nine years and took office on 11 March 2021.

== Background ==
The judges elected at this session replaced six judges whose terms ended in 2021. Four of those judges had been elected in 2011 for full nine-year terms; the other two had been elected in separate elections in 2013 and in 2015 to replace two judges elected in 2011 who had resigned. The newly elected judges will serve for nine years until 2030.

The election was governed by the Rome Statute of the International Criminal Court. Its article 36(8)(a) states that "[t]he States Parties shall, in the selection of judges, take into account the need, within the membership of the Court, for:

- (i) The representation of the principal legal systems of the world;
- (ii) Equitable geographical representation; and
- (iii) A fair representation of female and male judges."

Furthermore, article 36(3)(b) and 36(5) provide for two lists:

- List A contains those judges that "[h]ave established competence in criminal law and procedure, and the necessary relevant experience, whether as judge, prosecutor, advocate or in other similar capacity, in criminal proceedings";
- List B contains those who "[h]ave established competence in relevant areas of international law such as international humanitarian law and the law of human rights, and extensive experience in a professional legal capacity which is of relevance to the judicial work of the Court".

Each candidate has to belong to exactly one list. A minimum of nine judges elected from list A and five judges elected from list B is to be maintained on the court.

Further rules of election were adopted by a resolution of the Assembly of States Parties in 2004.

== Judges remaining in office ==
The following judges were scheduled to remain in office beyond 2021:

Judge	Nationality	List A or B		Regional criteria					Gender	
Judge	Nationality	List A	List B	African	Asian	E. European	GRULAG	WEOG	Female	Male
Reine Alapini-Gansou	Benin		X	X					X	
Solomy Balungi Bossa	Uganda	X		X					X	
Antoine Kesia-Mbe Mindua	Democratic Republic of the Congo		X	X						X
Tomoko Akane	Japan	X			X				X	
Chung Chang-ho	South Korea	X			X					X
Piotr Hofmański	Poland	X				X				X
Péter Kovács	Hungary		X			X				X
Luz del Carmen Ibáñez Carranza	Peru	X					X		X	
Rosario Salvatore Aitala	Italy	X						X		X
Marc Pierre Perrin de Brichambaut	France		X					X		X
Kimberly Prost	Canada	X						X	X	
Bertram Schmitt	Germany	X						X		X
		8	4	3	2	2	1	4	5	7

== Nomination process ==
The nomination period of judges for the 2020 election lasted from 6 January to 30 March 2020. It was first extended to 30 April on an emergency basis due to the COVID-19 pandemic and then extended once more on a regular basis because the required number of Asian and Eastern European candidates had not been nominated. A second Eastern European candidate was nominated during this second extension period, but no further Asian candidates were nominated, and thus the number of Asian candidates remained below the required number. The following persons were nominated:

Candidate	Nationality	List A or B		Regional criteria					Gender	
Candidate	Nationality	List A	List B	African	Asian	E. European	GRULAG	WEOG	Female	Male
Althea Violet Alexis-Windsor	Trinidad and Tobago	X					X		X	
Andrés Bernardo Barreto González	Colombia		X				X			X
Ishaq Usman Bello	Nigeria	X		X						X
Haykel Ben Mahfoudh	Tunisia		X	X						X
Khosbayar Chagdaa	Mongolia	X			X					X
Jasmina Ćosić Dedović	Bosnia and Herzegovina	X				X			X	
María del Socorro Flores Liera	Mexico		X				X		X	
Gberdao Gustave Kam	Burkina Faso		X	X						X
Joanna Korner	United Kingdom	X						X	X	
Gocha Lordkipanidze	Georgia		X			X				X
Laurence Massart	Belgium	X						X	X	
Prosper Milandou	Republic of the Congo	X		X						X
Ariela Peralta Distéfano	Uruguay		X				X		X	
Íñigo Francisco Alberto Salvador Crespo	Ecuador		X				X			X
Miatta Maria Samba	Sierra Leone	X		X					X	
Mônica Jacqueline Sifuentes	Brazil	X					X		X	
Viktor Panagiotis Tsilonis	Greece	X						X		X
Sergio Gerardo Ugalde Godínez	Costa Rica		X				X			X
		10	8	5	1	2	7	3	8	10

== Minimum voting requirements ==
Minimum voting requirements governed part of the election. This was to ensure that articles 36(5) and 36(8)(a) cited above were fulfilled. For this election, the following minimum voting requirements applied initially:

Criterion	Number of judges required	Number of judges remaining in office	Ex ante voting requirement	Number of candidates	Adjusted voting requirement	Adjusted voting requirement equals ex ante?
Lists A or B
List A	9	8	1	10	1	Yes
List B	5	4	1	8	1	Yes
Regional criteria
African	3	3	0	5	0	Yes
Asian	3	2	1	1	0	No
Eastern European	3	2	1	2	1	Yes
Latin American and Caribbean	3	1	2	7	2	Yes
Western European and other	3	4	0	3	0	Yes
Gender criteria
Female	6	5	1	8	1	Yes
Male	6	7	0	10	0	Yes

Regarding the List A or B requirement, one vote had to be cast for a List A candidate and one for a List B candidate.

Regarding the regional criteria, three votes had to be cast for certain regional groups: one for an Eastern European candidate and two for Latin American or Caribbean candidates.

Regarding the gender criteria, one vote had to be cast for a female candidate.

Because only one Asian candidate had been nominated, the regional minimum voting requirement for Asian candidates was adjusted to zero before the election pursuant to paragraph 20 (b) of the resolution that governs the elections.

The minimum voting requirements are updated after each ballot to account for the judges already elected. The regional and gender requirements are dropped either if they can no longer be (jointly) fulfilled, or if after four ballots not all seats are filled. The List A or B requirement remains active until a sufficient number of judges has been elected from each list.

== Ballots ==
The 19th session of the assembly was originally scheduled to take place on 7 to 17 December but had to be rescheduled due to COVID-19 restrictions. The resumption was further delayed by inclement weather conditions. As a result, the ballots took place on 18 to 23 December. The results were as follows:

Candidate	Nationality	18 December 2020		21 December 2020		22 December 2020		23 December 2020	
Candidate	Nationality	1st ballot	2nd ballot	3rd ballot	4th ballot	5th ballot	6th ballot	7th ballot	8th ballot
Valid votes cast		117	110	118	119	123	117	118	118
Two-thirds majority		78	74	79	80	82	78	79	79
Joanna Korner	United Kingdom	85	elected						
Gocha Lordkipanidze	Georgia	72	76	elected					
Miatta Maria Samba	Sierra Leone	62	57	83	elected				
María del Socorro Flores Liera	Mexico	61	67	78	87	elected			
Sergio Gerardo Ugalde Godínez	Costa Rica	62	66	72	87	elected			
Althea Violet Alexis-Windsor	Trinidad and Tobago	55	48	64	62	50	62	76	86
Haykel Ben Mahfoudh	Tunisia	42	39	48	42	40	38	42	32
Mônica Jacqueline Sifuentes	Brazil	36	33	49	33	16	14	withdrawn	
Viktor Panagiotis Tsilonis	Greece	14	14	11	5	3	3	withdrawn	
Laurence Massart	Belgium	32	33	32	22	12	withdrawn		
Jasmina Ćosić Dedović	Bosnia and Herzegovina	49	40	13	9	2	withdrawn		
Khosbayar Chagdaa	Mongolia	33	16	14	8	withdrawn			
Íñigo Francisco Alberto Salvador Crespo	Ecuador	18	14	withdrawn					
Andrés Bernardo Barreto González	Colombia	20	13	withdrawn					
Ariela Peralta Distéfano	Uruguay	17	12	withdrawn					
Gberdao Gustave Kam	Burkina Faso	19	7	withdrawn					
Ishaq Usman Bello	Nigeria	12	5	withdrawn					
Prosper Milandou	Republic of the Congo	7	3	withdrawn					

The minimum voting requirements are imposed on the ballots cast, not on the results. Thus, there is no guarantee that a corresponding number of judges is elected. However, in this election this was the case:

Criterion	Initial minimal voting requirement	Corresponding number of judges elected?
List A	1	Yes, after 1st ballot
List B	1	Yes, after 2nd ballot
Eastern European	1	Yes, after 2nd ballot
Latin American and Caribbean	2	Yes, after 4th ballot
Female	1	Yes, after 1st ballot

Note that these are the initial minimum voting requirements before the first ballot but after adjustment based on the number of candidates. Without that adjustment, there would have been a minimum voting requirement to cast one vote for an Asian candidate; no Asian candidate was elected.
