= 2014 International Criminal Court judges election =

- 8–16 December 2014

6 of 18 seats on the International Criminal Court
- Outgoing judges (South Korea) Sang-hyun Song (Bulgaria) Ekaterina Trendafilova (Finland) Erkki Kourula (Germany) Hans-Peter Kaul (Ghana) Akua Kuenyehia (Latvia) Anita Ušacka Elected judges (South Korea) Chung Chang-ho (Poland) Piotr Hofmański (France) Marc Pierre Perrin de Brichambaut (Germany) Bertram Schmitt (Democratic Republic of the Congo) Antoine Kesia-Mbe Mindua (Hungary) Péter Kovács

Six judges of the International Criminal Court were elected during the 13th session of the Assembly of States Parties to the Rome Statute of the International Criminal Court held from 8 to 17 December 2014 in New York. The judges were elected for terms of nine years and took office on 11 March 2015.

== Background ==
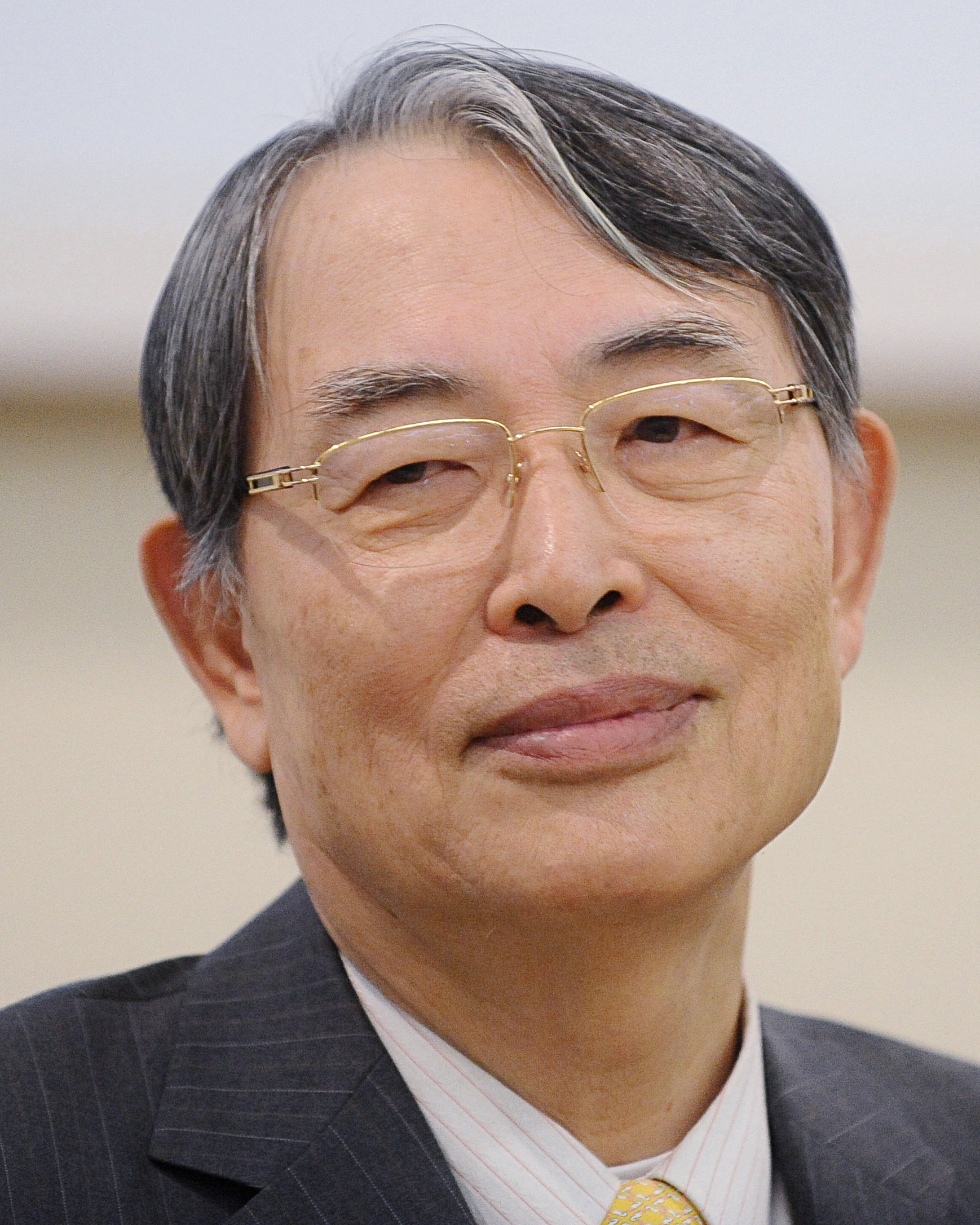
Song Sang-Hyun, then President of the International Criminal Court (ICC), was one of six judges whose terms expired on 11 March 2015.

The judges elected at this session replaced those six judges who were elected at the second election of ICC judges in 2006 for a full term of nine years; they also served for nine years until 2024.

The election was governed by the Rome Statute of the International Criminal Court. Its article 36(8)(a) states that "[t]he States Parties shall, in the selection of judges, take into account the need, within the membership of the Court, for:

- (i) The representation of the principal legal systems of the world;
- (ii) Equitable geographical representation; and
- (iii) A fair representation of female and male judges."

Furthermore, article 36(3)(b) and 36(5) provide for two lists:

- List A contains those judges that "[h]ave established competence in criminal law and procedure, and the necessary relevant experience, whether as judge, prosecutor, advocate or in other similar capacity, in criminal proceedings";
- List B contains those who "[h]ave established competence in relevant areas of international law such as international humanitarian law and the law of human rights, and extensive experience in a professional legal capacity which is of relevance to the judicial work of the Court".

Each candidate has to belong to exactly one list. A minimum of nine judges elected from list A and five judges elected from list B is to be maintained on the court.

Further rules of election were adopted by a resolution of the Assembly of States Parties in 2004.

== Judges remaining in office ==
The following judges were scheduled to remain in office beyond 2015:

Judge	Nationality	List A or B		Regional criteria					Gender	
Judge	Nationality	List A	List B	African	Asian	E. European	GRULAG	WEOG	Female	Male
Joyce Aluoch	Kenya	X		X					X	
Miriam Defensor Santiago	Philippines		X		X				X	
Chile Eboe-Osuji	Nigeria	X		X						X
Silvia Fernández de Gurmendi	Argentina	X					X		X	
Robert Fremr	Czech Republic	X				X				X
Geoffrey A. Henderson	Trinidad and Tobago	X					X			X
Olga Venecia Herrera Carbuccia	Dominican Republic	X					X		X	
Sanji Mmasenono Monageng	Botswana		X	X					X	
Howard Morrison	United Kingdom	X						X		X
Kuniko Ozaki	Japan		X		X				X	
Cuno Tarfusser	Italy	X						X		X
Christine van den Wyngaert	Belgium	X						X	X	
		9	3	3	2	1	3	3	7	5

== Nomination process ==
The nomination period of judges for the 2014 election lasted from 28 April to 20 July 2014. As only one of two required nominations from Asia had been received, it was extended once until 3 August 2014, resulting in a second nomination from Asia. The following persons were nominated:

Candidate	Nationality	List A or B		Regional criteria					Gender	
Candidate	Nationality	List A	List B	African	Asian	E. European	GRULAG	WEOG	Female	Male
Reine Alapini-Gansou	Benin		X	X					X	
Abdelkader Ben Ali Bahloul	Tunisia	X		X						X
Emmanuel Yaw Benneh	Ghana		X	X						X
Toma Birmontienė	Lithuania		X			X			X	
Leonardo Nemer Caldeira Brant	Brazil		X				X			X
Chung Chang-ho	South Korea	X			X					X
Zlata Đurđević	Croatia		X			X			X	
Pavel Gontšarov	Estonia	X				X				X
Piotr Hofmański	Poland	X				X				X
Péter Kovács	Hungary		X			X				X
Antoine Kesia-Mbe Mindua	Democratic Republic of the Congo		X	X						X
Maria Natércia Gusmão Pereira	Timor-Leste	X			X				X	
Marc Pierre Perrin de Brichambaut	France		X					X		X
Harimahefa Ratiaraisoa	Madagascar		X	X					X	
Bertram Schmitt	Germany	X						X		X
Krister Hans Thelin	Sweden	X						X		X
Mindia Ugrekhelidze	Georgia	X				X				X
		8	9	5	2	6	1	3	5	12

== Minimum voting requirements ==
Minimum voting requirements governed part of the election. This was to ensure that articles 36(5) and 36(8)(a) cited above were fulfilled. For this election, the following minimum voting requirements applied initially:

Criterion	Number of judges required	Number of judges remaining in office	Ex ante voting requirement	Number of candidates	Adjusted voting requirement	Adjusted voting requirement equals ex ante?
List A or B
List A	9	9	0	8	0	Yes
List B	5	3	2	9	2	Yes
Regional criteria
African	3	3	0	5	0	Yes
Asian	3	2	1	2	1	Yes
Eastern European	3	1	2	6	2	Yes
Latin American and Caribbean	3	3	0	1	0	Yes
Western European and other	3	3	0	3	0	Yes
Gender criteria
Female	6	7	0	5	0	Yes
Male	6	5	1	12	1	Yes

Regarding the List A or B requirement, two votes had to be cast for List B candidates.

Regarding the regional criteria, three votes had to be cast for certain regional groups: two for Eastern European candidates and one for an Asian candidate.

Regarding the gender criteria, one vote had to be cast for a male candidate.

The regional and gender requirements could have been adjusted before the election depending on the number of candidates, pursuant to paragraphs 20 (b) and (c) of the resolution that governs the elections.

The minimum voting requirements are updated after each ballot to account for the judges already elected. The regional and gender requirements are dropped either if they can no longer be (jointly) fulfilled, or if after four ballots not all seats are filled. The List A or B requirement remains active until a sufficient number of judges has been elected from each list.

== Ballots ==
The ballot results were as follows:

Candidate	Nationality	List A or B	Region	Gender	8 December 2014	9 December 2014			10 December 2014			12 December 2014			
Candidate	Nationality	List A or B	Region	Gender	1st ballot	2nd ballot	3rd ballot	4th ballot	5th ballot	6th ballot	7th ballot	8th ballot	9th ballot	10th ballot	11th ballot
Valid votes cast					104	107	116	116	116	117	119	113	117	118	117
Two-thirds majority					70	72	78	78	78	78	80	76	78	79	78
Chung Chang-ho	South Korea	List A	Asia	Male	73	elected									
Piotr Hofmański	Poland	List A	Eastern Europe	Male	63	66	72	87	elected						
Marc Pierre Perrin de Brichambaut	France	List B	Western Europe and Others	Male	61	58	67	75	73	87	elected				
Bertram Schmitt	Germany	List A	Western Europe and Others	Male	67	68	69	71	71	79	elected				
Antoine Kesia-Mbe Mindua	Democratic Republic of the Congo	List B	Africa	Male	39	42	51	54	66	65	69	71	77	84	elected
Péter Kovács	Hungary	List B	Eastern Europe	Male	52	59	59	68	56	63	54	57	56	55	46
Maria Natércia Gusmão Pereira	Timor-Leste	List A	Asia	Female	38	19	20	24	35	34	34	29	33	31	29
Krister Hans Thelin	Sweden	List A	Western Europe and Others	Male	44	45	44	52	43	43	35	37	37	36	28
Leonardo Nemer Caldeira Brant	Brazil	List B	Latin America and Caribbean	Male	34	35	27	28	34	33	22	24	22	19	14
Reine Alapini-Gansou	Benin	List B	Africa	Female	12	16	20	23	15	13	6	4	3	3	withdrawn
Zlata Đurđević	Croatia	List B	Eastern Europe	Female	35	35	34	38	24	26	10	withdrawn			
Mindia Ugrekhelidze	Georgia	List A	Eastern Europe	Male	23	20	25	23	15	10	3	withdrawn			
Toma Birmontienė	Lithuania	List B	Eastern Europe	Female	22	20	27	25	12	withdrawn					
Pavel Gontšarov	Estonia	List A	Eastern Europe	Male	26	23	27	withdrawn							
Abdelkader Ben Ali Bahloul	Tunisia	List A	Africa	Male	12	15	17	withdrawn							
Harimahefa Ratiaraisoa	Madagascar	List B	Africa	Female	11	8	14	withdrawn							
Emmanuel Yaw Benneh	Ghana	List B	Africa	Male	5	3	withdrawn								

Candidate	Nationality	List A or B	Region	Gender	15 December 2014							16 December 2014			
Candidate	Nationality	List A or B	Region	Gender	12th ballot	13th ballot	14th ballot	15th ballot	16th ballot	17th ballot	18th ballot	19th ballot	20th ballot	21st ballot	22nd ballot
Valid votes cast					114	117	117	111	114	115	114	110	114	115	116
Two-thirds majority					76	78	78	74	76	77	76	74	76	77	78
Péter Kovács	Hungary	List B	Eastern Europe	Male	44	60	60	59	62	65	65	66	70	73	79
Maria Natércia Gusmão Pereira	Timor-Leste	List A	Asia	Female	46	57	57	52	52	50	49	44	44	42	37
Krister Hans Thelin	Sweden	List A	Western Europe and Others	Male	24	withdrawn									
Leonardo Nemer Caldeira Brant	Brazil	List B	Latin America and Caribbean	Male	withdrawn										

The minimum voting requirements are imposed on the ballots cast, not on the results. Thus, there is no guarantee that a corresponding number of judges is elected. However, in this election this was the case:

Criterion	Initial minimal voting requirement	Corresponding number of judges elected?
List B	2	Yes, after 10th ballot
Asian	1	Yes, after 1st ballot
Eastern European	2	Yes, after 22nd ballot
Male	1	Yes, after 1st ballot

Note that the regional minimum voting requirement was dropped after the 4th ballot and was thus no longer being imposed when a second Eastern European judge was elected in the 22nd ballot.
