= 2013 International Criminal Court judges election =

- 23 November 2013

1 of 18 seats on the International Criminal Court
- Outgoing judge (Trinidad and Tobago) Anthony Carmona Elected judge (Trinidad and Tobago) Geoffrey A. Henderson

A special election for one judge of the International Criminal Court was held during the 12th session of the Assembly of States Parties to the Rome Statute of the International Criminal Court which took place in The Hague from 20 to 28 November 2013.

The election became necessary after one judge elected in the 2011 election was unavailable: Anthony Carmona had been elected President of Trinidad and Tobago and had resigned from the bench on 18 March 2013.

Geoffrey A. Henderson, also from Trinidad and Tobago, was elected in the first ballot after his only opponent's candidacy had been withdrawn.

== Background ==
The judge elected in this election was chosen to complete the term, until 10 March 2021, of the judge he replaced.

The election is governed by the Rome Statute of the International Criminal Court. Its article 36(8)(a) states that "[t]he States Parties shall, in the selection of judges, take into account the need, within the membership of the Court, for:

- (i) The representation of the principal legal systems of the world;
- (ii) Equitable geographical representation; and
- (iii) A fair representation of female and male judges."

Furthermore, article 36(3)(b) and 36(5) provide for two lists:

- List A contains those judges that "[h]ave established competence in criminal law and procedure, and the necessary relevant experience, whether as judge, prosecutor, advocate or in other similar capacity, in criminal proceedings";
- List B contains those who "[h]ave established competence in relevant areas of international law such as international humanitarian law and the law of human rights, and extensive experience in a professional legal capacity which is of relevance to the judicial work of the Court".

Each candidate must belong to exactly one list.

A minimum of nine judges elected from list A and five judges elected from list B is to be maintained on the court.

Further rules of election were adopted by a resolution of the Assembly of States Parties in 2004.

== Judges remaining in office ==
The following judges remained in office:

Judge	Nationality	List A or B		Regional criteria					Gender	
Judge	Nationality	List A	List B	African	Asian	E. European	GRULAG	WEOG	Female	Male
Joyce Aluoch	Kenya	X		X					X	
Chile Eboe-Osuji	Nigeria	X		X						X
Akua Kuenyehia	Ghana		X	X					X	
Sanji Mmasenono Monageng	Botswana		X	X					X	
Miriam Defensor Santiago	Philippines		X		X				X	
Kuniko Ozaki	Japan		X		X				X	
Sang-hyun Song	South Korea	X			X					X
Robert Fremr	Czech Republic	X				X				X
Ekaterina Trendafilova	Bulgaria	X				X			X	
Anita Ušacka	Latvia		X			X			X	
Silvia Fernández de Gurmendi	Argentina	X					X		X	
Olga Venecia Herrera Carbuccia	Dominican Republic	X					X		X	
Hans-Peter Kaul	Germany		X					X		X
Erkki Kourula	Finland		X					X		X
Howard Morrison	United Kingdom	X						X		X
Cuno Tarfusser	Italy	X						X		X
Christine van den Wyngaert	Belgium	X						X	X	
		10	7	4	3	3	2	5	10	7

== Nomination process ==
The nomination period of judges for the 2013 special election lasted from 28 August to 8 October 2013 and could have been extended up to three times if there had been a lack of candidates from a group for which a minimum voting requirement was in place. According to paragraph 27(d) of the 2004 resolution, only candidates from the Latin American and Caribbean States could be nominated. The period was not extended, as the sole minimum voting requirement was matched by the required two candidates. The following persons were nominated:

Name	Nationality	List A or B	Region	Gender
Geoffrey A. Henderson	Trinidad and Tobago	List A	Latin American and Caribbean States	Male
Leslie van Rompaey	Uruguay	List A	Latin American and Caribbean States	Male

== Minimum voting requirements ==
Minimum voting requirements governed part of the election. This was to ensure that articles 36(5) and 36(8)(a) cited above were fulfilled. For this election, the following minimum voting requirements applied initially:

Regarding the List A or B requirement, there was no minimum voting requirement.

Regarding the regional criteria, there was a voting requirement for one judge from the Latin American and Caribbean States.

Regarding the gender criteria, there was no minimum voting requirement.

The regional criterion could have been adjusted even before the election depending on the number of candidates. Paragraph 20(b) of the ASP resolution that governed the elections states that if there are less than double the number of candidates required for each region, the minimum voting requirement shall be a (rounded-up) half of the number of candidates; except when there is only one candidate which results in no voting requirement.

The regional criterion would have been dropped if after four ballots the seat had not been filled.

The voting requirements were as follows:

Criterion	Number of judges required	Number of judges remaining in office	Ex ante voting requirement	Number of candidates	Adjusted voting requirement	Adjusted voting requirement equals ex ante?
Lists A or B
List A	9	10	0	2	0	Yes
List B	5	7	0	0	0	Yes
Regional criteria
African	3	4	0	0	0	Yes
Asian	3	3	0	0	0	Yes
Eastern European	3	3	0	0	0	Yes
Latin American and Caribbean	3	2	1	2	1	Yes
Western European and other	3	5	0	0	0	Yes
Gender criteria
Female	6	10	0	0	0	Yes
Male	6	7	0	2	0	Yes

== Ballots ==
Leslie van Rompaey's candidacy was withdrawn before the ballot.

The ballot took place on 23 November 2013. The voting totals were as follows:

Name	Nationality	List A or B	Region	Gender	1st round
Number of States Parties voting					98
Two-thirds majority					66
Geoffrey A. Henderson	Trinidad and Tobago	List A	Latin American and Caribbean States	Male	98

As only candidates from the Latin American and Caribbean States could be nominated, the elected judge necessarily satisfied the corresponding regional criterion.
