= 2011 International Criminal Court judges election =

- 12–16 December 2011

6 of 18 seats on the International Criminal Court
- Outgoing judges (Uganda) Daniel Nsereko (Costa Rica) Elizabeth Odio Benito (France) Bruno Cotte (Brazil) Sylvia H. de Figueiredo Steiner (United Kingdom) Adrian Fulford (Mali) Fatoumata Dembélé Diarra Elected judges (Philippines) Miriam Defensor Santiago (Trinidad and Tobago) Anthony Carmona (Czech Republic) Robert Fremr (Dominican Republic) Olga Venecia Herrera Carbuccia (United Kingdom) Howard Morrison (Nigeria) Chile Eboe-Osuji

Six judges of the International Criminal Court were elected during the 10th session of the Assembly of States Parties to the Rome Statute of the International Criminal Court held in New York between 12 and 21 December 2011. Anthony Carmona of Trinidad and Tobago, Miriam Defensor Santiago of the Philippines, Chile Eboe-Osuji of Nigeria, Robert Fremr of the Czech Republic, Olga Venecia Herrera Carbuccia of the Dominican Republic and Howard Morrison of the United Kingdom were elected. Their terms were scheduled to begin on 11 March 2012. Five of them were sworn in on 9 March 2012; Defensor Santiago deferred her oath of office and resigned on 3 June 2014 without taking up her duties.

== Background ==
The judges elected at this session were to replace those six judges who were elected at the first election of ICC judges in 2003 for a full term of nine years; they were also to serve for nine years until 2021.

The election was governed by the Rome Statute of the International Criminal Court. Its article 36(8)(a) states that "[t]he States Parties shall, in the selection of judges, take into account the need, within the membership of the Court, for:

- (i) The representation of the principal legal systems of the world;
- (ii) Equitable geographical representation; and
- (iii) A fair representation of female and male judges."

Furthermore, article 36(3)(b) and 36(5) provide for two lists:

- List A contains those judges that "[h]ave established competence in criminal law and procedure, and the necessary relevant experience, whether as judge, prosecutor, advocate or in other similar capacity, in criminal proceedings";
- List B contains those who "[h]ave established competence in relevant areas of international law such as international humanitarian law and the law of human rights, and extensive experience in a professional legal capacity which is of relevance to the judicial work of the Court".

Each candidate had to belong to exactly one list.

Further rules of election were adopted by a resolution of the Assembly of States Parties in 2004.

== Judges remaining in office ==
The following judges were scheduled to remain in office beyond 2012:

Judge	Nationality	List A or B		Regional criteria					Gender	
Judge	Nationality	List A	List B	African	Asian	E. European	GRULAC	WEOG	Female	Male
Joyce Aluoch	Kenya	X		X					X	
Silvia Fernández de Gurmendi	Argentina	X					X		X	
Hans-Peter Kaul	Germany		X					X		X
Erkki Kourula	Finland		X					X		X
Akua Kuenyehia	Ghana		X	X					X	
Sanji Mmasenono Monageng	Botswana		X	X					X	
Kuniko Ozaki	Japan		X		X				X	
Sang-hyun Song	South Korea	X			X					X
Cuno Tarfusser	Italy	X						X		X
Ekaterina Trendafilova	Bulgaria	X				X			X	
Anita Ušacka	Latvia		X			X			X	
Christine van den Wyngaert	Belgium	X						X	X	
		6	6	3	2	2	1	4	8	4

== Nomination process ==
The nomination period of judges for the 2011 election lasted from 13 June to 2 September 2011 and was extended once until 16 September 2011 because only three of the required four nominations from the Latin American and Caribbean States had been received. The following persons were nominated:

Candidate	Nationality	List A or B		Regional criteria					Gender	
Candidate	Nationality	List A	List B	African	Asian	E. European	GRULAC	WEOG	Female	Male
Rosolu John Bankole Thompson	Sierra Leone	X		X						X
Ajmi Bel Haj Hamouda	Tunisia	X		X						X
Vinod Boolell	Mauritius	X		X						X
Modeste-Martineau Bria	Central African Republic	X		X						X
Anthony Carmona	Trinidad and Tobago	X					X			X
Bruno Cathala	France	X						X		X
Eduardo Cifuentes Muñoz	Colombia	X					X			X
Władysław Czapliński	Poland		X			X				X
Miriam Defensor Santiago	Philippines		X		X				X	
Chile Eboe-Osuji	Nigeria	X		X						X
Robert Fremr	Czech Republic	X				X				X
Olga Venecia Herrera Carbuccia	Dominican Republic	X					X		X	
Gberdao Gustave Kam	Burkina Faso	X		X						X
Javier Laynez Potisek	Mexico	X					X			X
Antoine Kesia-Mbe Mindua	Democratic Republic of the Congo	X		X						X
Howard Morrison	United Kingdom	X						X		X
Hamani Mounkaile Nouhou	Niger	X		X						X
George A. Serghides	Cyprus	X			X					X
Jorge Antonio Urbina Ortega	Costa Rica		X				X			X
		16	3	8	2	2	5	2	2	17

The nomination of Ajmi Bel Haj Hamouda was withdrawn before the session.

== Minimum voting requirements ==
Minimum voting requirements governed part of the election. This was to ensure that article 36(8)(a) cited above was fulfilled. For this election, the following minimum voting requirements initially applied.

Regarding the List A or B requirement, States Parties initially had to vote for three candidates from list A. There was no minimum voting requirement for candidates from list B, as enough judges from that list remained on the bench.

Regarding the regional criteria, minimum voting requirements were originally announced for two regional groups: One vote had to be cast for an Eastern European candidate and two for candidates from Latin American and Caribbean States. On 21 September 2011, after the nomination period had ended, the Maldives acceded to the Rome Statute as the 17th Asia–Pacific State Party. On 13 October 2011, the Bureau of the Assembly of States Parties notified the States Parties that the accession would take effect on 1 December 2011, before the election, triggering an increase in the corresponding minimum voting requirement pursuant to paragraph 20(b) of the 2004 resolution. Accordingly, four votes initially had to be cast according to regional minimum voting requirements – one for an Asia-Pacific candidate, one for an Eastern European candidate, and two for candidates from Latin American and Caribbean States. There was no minimum voting requirement for candidates from African and Western European and other states, as enough judges from these regional groups remained on the bench.

Regarding the gender criteria, there was no minimum voting requirement for female candidates. States Parties initially had to vote for two male candidates.

The regional and gender criteria could have been adjusted even before the election depending on the number of candidates. Paragraph 20(b) of the 2004 resolution states that if there are fewer than twice the number of candidates required for a region, the corresponding minimum voting requirement is half the number of candidates (rounded up), except if there is only one candidate, which results in no voting requirement. Furthermore, if the number of candidates of one gender is less than ten, then the minimum voting requirement is limited to a certain number depending on the number of candidates. In this election, no adjustment was necessary.

The regional and gender criteria are dropped if they can no longer be (jointly) fulfilled, and in any case after the fourth ballot.

Given the nominations (already taking into account the withdrawal of Ajmi Bel Haj Hamouda, which did not change the result, however), the initial minimum voting requirements were as follows:

Criterion	Number of judges required	Number of judges remaining in office	Ex ante voting requirement	Number of candidates	Adjusted voting requirement	Adjusted requirement equals ex ante?
Lists A or B
List A	9	6	3	15	3	Yes
List B	5	6	0	3	0	Yes
Regional criteria
African states	3	3	0	7	0	Yes
Asian states	3	2	1	2	1	Yes
Eastern European states	3	2	1	2	1	Yes
Latin American and Caribbean States	3	1	2	5	2	Yes
Western European and other States	3	4	0	2	0	Yes
Gender criteria
Female	6	8	0	2	0	Yes
Male	6	4	2	16	2	Yes

== Campaign on International Criminal Court Elections ==
Because of the importance of qualified and impartial judges, NGOs have taken a particular interest in the ICC judges election. The "Campaign on International Criminal Court Elections" was launched to promote the nomination and election of the most highly qualified officials through fair, merit-based, and transparent processes. This Campaign is sponsored by the Coalition for the International Criminal Court, a group of NGOs. Among other things, the Coalition is strongly opposed to "vote-trading" among States Parties. In December 2010, the Coalition established an Independent Panel on International Criminal Court Judicial Elections. The panel was to "issue a report containing an assessment of each judicial candidate as 'Qualified' or 'Not Qualified' after the closing of the nomination period and in advance of the December 2011 elections." The members of the panel were:

- The Honourable Richard Goldstone (chair)
- The Honourable Patricia Wald (vice-chair)
- The Honourable Hans Corell
- Judge O-Gon Kwon
- Dr. Cecilia Medina Quiroga

On 26 October 2011, the Panel published a report in which it assessed the candidates in regard to their qualification to serve as a judge on the ICC in their respective list. All nominees except for Ajmi Bel Haj Hamouda, Javier Laynez Potisek, George A. Serghides and Jorge Antonio Urbina Ortega were assessed as qualified.

== Ballots ==
The ballot results were as follows:

Name	Nationality	List A or B	Region	Gender	12 December 2011	13 December 2011				14 December 2011			15 December 2011	
Name	Nationality	List A or B	Region	Gender	1st round	2nd round	3rd round	4th round	5th round	6th round	7th round	8th round	9th round	10th round
Number of States Parties voting					104	107	115	116	117	115	115	114	112	114
Two-thirds majority					70	72	77	78	78	77	77	76	75	76
Miriam Defensor Santiago	Philippines	List B	Asian States	Female	79	elected								
Anthony Carmona	Trinidad and Tobago	List A	Latin American and Caribbean States	Male	72	elected								
Robert Fremr	Czech Republic	List A	Eastern European States	Male	62	77	elected							
Howard Morrison	United Kingdom	List A	Western European and other States	Male	51	54	62	64	67	71	69	69	70	62
Chile Eboe-Osuji	Nigeria	List A	African States	Male	34	39	41	47	51	52	57	58	56	61
Olga Venecia Herrera Carbuccia	Dominican Republic	List A	Latin American and Caribbean States	Female	44	36	38	38	40	40	41	46	57	52
Bruno Cathala	France	List A	Western European and other States	Male	40	44	46	50	51	54	50	54	46	45
Vinod Boolell	Mauritius	List A	African States	Male	27	29	25	30	31	26	39	37	38	40
Jorge Antonio Urbina Ortega	Costa Rica	List B	Latin American and Caribbean States	Male	36	37	37	49	45	46	39	39	44	31
Javier Laynez Potisek	Mexico	List A	Latin American and Caribbean States	Male	33	28	32	34	30	33	25	24	withdrawn	
Eduardo Cifuentes Muñoz	Colombia	List A	Latin American and Caribbean States	Male	35	29	25	23	17	16	12	withdrawn		
Władysław Czapliński	Poland	List B	Eastern European States	Male	46	36	14	9	11	withdrawn				
Antoine Kesia-Mbe Mindua	Democratic Republic of the Congo	List A	African States	Male	12	10	6	withdrawn						
George A. Serghides	Cyprus	List A	Asian States	Male	28	6	withdrawn							
Modeste-Martineau Bria	Central African Republic	List A	African States	Male	1	2	withdrawn							
Gberdao Gustave Kam	Burkina Faso	List A	African States	Male	10	withdrawn								
Hamani Mounkaile Nouhou	Niger	List A	African States	Male	7	withdrawn								
Rosolu John Bankole Thompson	Sierra Leone	List A	African States	Male	3	withdrawn								

Name	Nationality	List A or B	Region	Gender	15 December 2011		16 December 2011		
Name	Nationality	List A or B	Region	Gender	11th round	12th round	13th round	14th round	15th round
Number of States Parties voting					109	109	105	113	102
Two-thirds majority					73	73	70	76	68
Olga Venecia Herrera Carbuccia	Dominican Republic	List A	Latin American and Caribbean States	Female	71	77	elected		
Howard Morrison	United Kingdom	List A	Western European and other States	Male	64	66	72	elected	
Chile Eboe-Osuji	Nigeria	List A	African States	Male	62	63	59	68	102
Bruno Cathala	France	List A	Western European and other States	Male	44	46	45	45	withdrawn
Vinod Boolell	Mauritius	List A	African States	Male	36	34	22	withdrawn	
Jorge Antonio Urbina Ortega	Costa Rica	List B	Latin American and Caribbean States	Male	withdrawn				

After the first ballot, minimum voting requirement for Asian States dropped to zero. The list A minimum voting requirement dropped to two, the Latin American and Caribbean States (GRULAC) minimum voting requirement dropped to one and the male candidates minimum voting requirement dropped to one, as well. The Eastern European States minimum voting requirement remained at one.

After the second ballot, the minimum voting requirement for Eastern European States dropped to zero, as did the one for male candidates. The list A minimum voting requirement dropped to one while the GRULAC requirement remained at one.

After no new judges were elected during the third and fourth ballot, the GRULAC minimum voting requirement was abandoned. Only the list A minimum voting requirement (one judge) remained in place until such a judge was elected.

The minimum voting requirements are imposed on the ballots cast, not on the results. Thus, there is no guarantee that a corresponding number of judges is elected. However, in this election this was the case:

Criterion	Initial minimum voting requirement	Corresponding number of judges elected?
List A	3	Yes, after 12th ballot
Asian	1	Yes, after 1st ballot
Eastern European	1	Yes, after 2nd ballot
Latin American and Caribbean	2	Yes, after 12th ballot
Male	2	Yes, after 2nd ballot

Note that the regional minimum voting requirement was dropped after the 4th ballot and was thus no longer being imposed when a second Latin American and Caribbean judge was elected in the 12th ballot.
