= Jorge Urbina =

Jorge Urbina may refer to:

- Jorge Urbina (diplomat) (born 1946), Costa Rican diplomat and permanent resident to the United Nations
- Jorge Urbina (footballer) (born 1977), Mexican football manager and former player
