= International community =

Imprecise geopolitical term

A prominent criticism against usage of the word in media is that it has become synonymous with the Western world, with the very noticeable exclusion of Asian (except Japan and Israel, owning to their influential alliances with the US), African and Latin American opinion.

The international community is a term used in geopolitics and international relations to refer to all recognized countries, or to a broad group of people and governments of the world.

== Usage ==
Aside from its use as a general descriptor, the term is typically used to imply the existence of a common point of view towards such specific issues as human rights, environmental conservation, climate change, including other matters of multilateral cooperation and collaboration. It is also sometimes used in calling for action to be taken against an enemy, e.g., action against perceived political repression in a target country. The term is also commonly used to imply legitimacy and consensus for a point of view on a disputed issue, e.g., to enhance the credibility of a majority vote in the United Nations General Assembly.

== Criticism ==
There have been several prominent legal figures and authors that have argued the term is more often used to describe a small minority or group of states, and not literally all nations or states in the world, although this is not a universally accepted opinion as a phrase is colloquially used by many people. According to International Criminal Court jurist Victor P. Tsilonis, referred to "the interests of the most powerful states" or "seven to ten states". President of the International Tribunal for the Law of the Sea Paik Jin-hyun and co-authors Lee Seokwoo and Kevin Tan argue that it could refer to "some 20 affluent states", giving the example of those not members of the Non-Aligned Movement, while Professor Peter Burnell of the University of Warwick suggests that a number of very important states, such as China, Russia and those of the Arab and greater Islamic worlds, are often distant from the concept of the "international community" and do not necessarily endorse every initiative associated with it, for example, by abstaining from key votes in the United Nations Security Council. Noam Chomsky states that the term is used to refer to the United States and its allies and client states, as well as allies in the media of those states. British journalist Martin Jacques says: "We all know what is meant by the term 'international community', don't we? It's the West, of course, nothing more, nothing less. Using the term 'international community' is a way of dignifying the west, of globalising it, of making it sound more respectable, more neutral, and high-faluting." According to American political scientist Samuel P. Huntington, the term is a euphemistic replacement for the earlier propaganda term "Free World".

== See also ==
- Democracy
- First World
- Free world
- Global village
- World community
- Sources of international law
- Member states of the United Nations
