= Lainez =

Lainez is a surname. Alternative spellings of the surname include Láinez, Laínez, Laíñez and Laynez. Notable people with the surnames include:

- César Láinez (born 1977), Spanish footballer
- Diego Lainez (born 2000), Mexican footballer
- Diego Laynez (occasionally Lainez, 1512–1565), Spanish Jesuit priest and theologian
- Étienne Lainez (1753–1822), French operatic tenor
- Manuel Mujica Lainez (1910–1984), Argentine novelist, essayist, translator and art critic
- Javier Laynez Potisek (born 1959), Mexican jurist
- Josep Carles Laínez (born 1970), Spanish writer
- Mauro Lainez (born 1996), Mexican footballer
- Nelly Láinez (1920–2008), Argentine comedic actress
- René Colato Laínez (born 1970), Hispanic educator and author
- Shervin Lainez American photographer

== See also ==
- Laine, surname
- Lainé, surname
