= Ugrekhelidze =

Ugrekhelidze (Georgian: უგრეხელიძე) is a Georgian surname. Notable people with the surname include:

- Mindia Ugrekhelidze (born 1942), Georgian judge and legal academic
- Tengiz Ugrekhelidze (born 1981), Georgian former football defender
- Vladimer Ugrekhelidze (1939–2009), Soviet-Georgian basketball player
