= Iain Bonomy, Lord Bonomy =

British judge (born 1946)

The Right Honourable Lord Bonomy PC
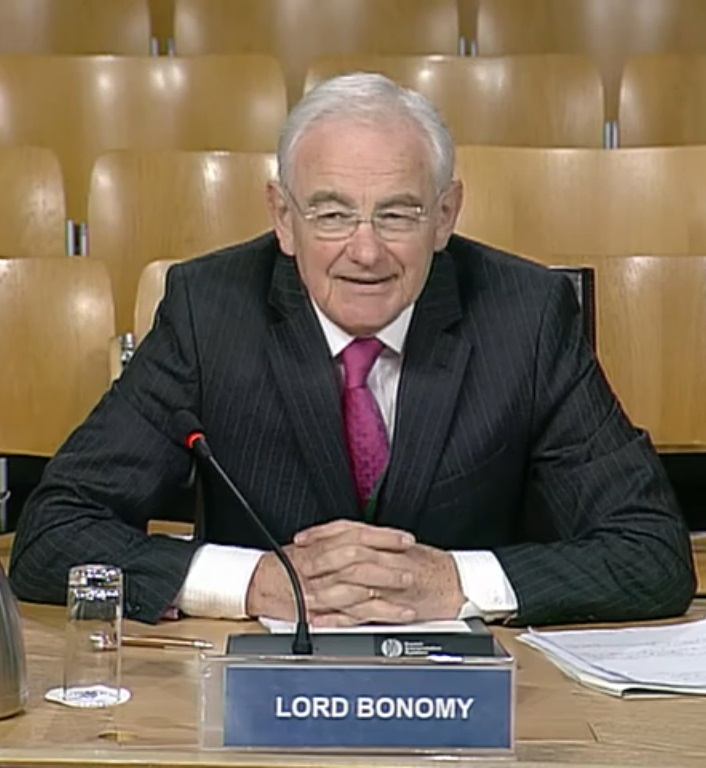
- Bonomy in 2017

Senator of the College of Justice
- In office 1997–2012
- Appointed by: Elizabeth II

Judge of the International Criminal Tribunal for the former Yugoslavia
- In office 1 June 2004 – August 2009
- Appointed by: Kofi Annan
- Preceded by: Sir Richard May
- Succeeded by: Howard Morrison

Personal details
- Born: 15 January 1946 (age 80) Motherwell, Scotland
- Education: University of Glasgow
- Profession: Advocate
- Website: Scottish Courts Service

Iain Bonomy, Lord Bonomy, PC (born 15 January 1946) is a former Senator of the College of Justice, a judge of the Supreme Courts of Scotland, sitting in the High Court of Justiciary and the Inner House of the Court of Session from 2010 to 2012. From 2004 to 2009, he was a Judge of the International Criminal Tribunal for the former Yugoslavia.

== Early life ==
Born on 15 January 1946 in Motherwell, Bonomy attended Dalziel High School and the School of Law of the University of Glasgow, graduating LL.B. in 1968. In 2006, he was awarded an honorary LL.D. by the university.

He undertook his apprenticeship as a solicitor at East Kilbride Town Council between 1968 and 1970, before moving into practice with Ballantyne and Copland in Motherwell, rising to become a partner. In 1983, he left to begin devilling, and in 1984 was admitted to the Faculty of Advocates, gaining Queen's Counsel status in 1993. From 1990 to 1996, he served as an Advocate Depute, and in 1996 served as senior counsel to the Dunblane Inquiry.

== Judicial career ==
In 1997, he was appointed a Senator of the College of Justice, a judge of the Court of Session and High Court of Justiciary, Scotland's supreme courts, taking the judicial title, Lord Bonomy. He sat primarily on civil and criminal cases at first instance, although occasionally sat on appellate business. A tabloid newspaper nicknamed him "Judge Dread" when he jailed a heroin-dealer for ten years for failing within twenty-four hours to name his supplier. In 2001, he led a review for the Scottish Executive of the Practices and Procedure of the High Court; the report, Improving Practice – the 2002 Review of the Practices and Procedures of the High Court of Justiciary was published in December 2002.

In 2004, he was appointed to the International Criminal Tribunal for the former Yugoslavia (ICTY), sitting as a judge on many high-profile cases, and presiding over the trial of former Serbian President Milan Milutinović. In August 2008, he was appointed to preside over preparations for the trial of captured former Bosnian Serb leader Radovan Karadžić. He resigned from the ICTY in 2009 for personal reasons, and was succeeded by Howard Morrison.

He was appointed to the Inner House of the Court of Session on 16 August 2010 and appointed to the Privy Council in October 2010. He retired in 2012. He was appointed as chairman of the Infant Cremation Commission in April 2013, whose report was published in June 2014.

On 6 February 2020 he was appointed as a Judge to the United Nations International Residual Mechanism for Criminal Tribunals (IRMCT). The IRMCT is a small, temporary tribunal continuing the work of the ICTY and the International Criminal Tribunal for Rwanda.
