= Joanna Korner =

British judge (born 1951)

Her Excellency Judge Joanna Korner CMG, KC
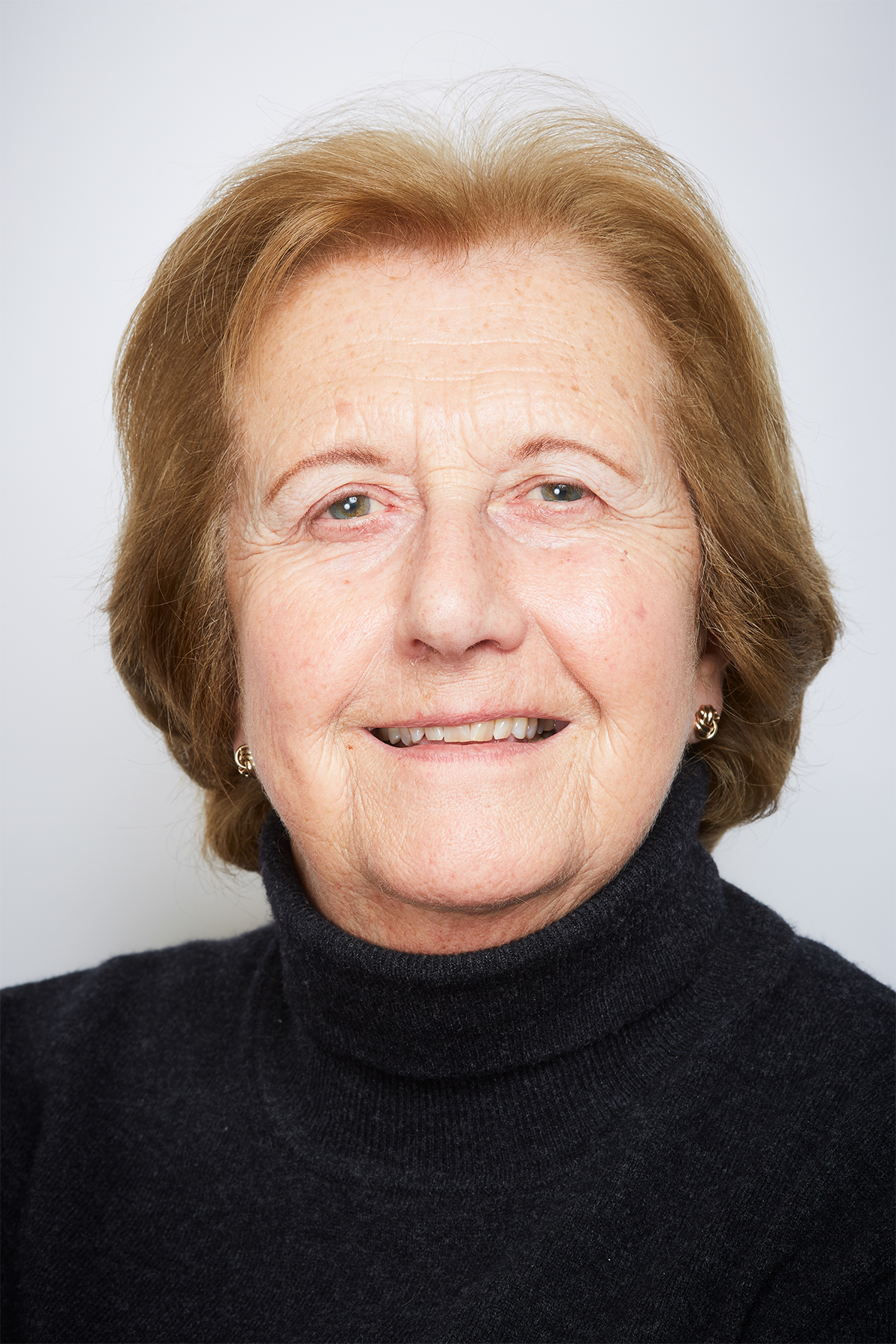

Judge of the International Criminal Court
- Incumbent
- Assumed office 11 March 2021
- Nominated by: United Kingdom
- Appointed by: Assembly of States Parties

Personal details
- Born: Joanna Korner; 1 July 1951 (age 75) United Kingdom
- Education: University of London; Inner Temple
- Occupation: Lawyer, judge
- Profession: Barrister

Joanna Korner CMG, KC (born 1 July 1951) is a British judge of the International Criminal Court.

== Legal career ==
Korner was called to the Bar at Inner Temple in 1974, following study at the Inns of Court School of Law, now The City Law School in London. From 1975 to 1993, Korner was a practising barrister at 6 King's Bench Walk, London undertaking criminal work both as the prosecution and defence. In 1993, Korner was made a Queen's Counsel and became a recorder in the Crown Court of England and Wales in 1994 undertaking serious criminal cases including fraud, murder, serious sexual offences and other grave crimes. In 1999, Korner became a senior prosecuting trial attorney at the Office of the Prosecutor at the International Criminal Tribunal for the former Yugoslavia. In 2012, Korner became a judge of the Crown Court. In 2014, Korner was appointed to the specialist fraud court presiding over trials of public interest involving hacking, insider trading, multimillion-pound scams and large-scale theft.

== International Criminal Tribunal for the former Yugoslavia ==
From 1999 to 2004, Korner was a Senior Prosecuting Trial Attorney for at the Office of the Prosecutor at the International Criminal Tribunal for the former Yugoslavia trying high-level leaders charged with breaches of international humanitarian law. She was the lead prosecutor in two trials of political and military leaders: Prosecutor v. Radoslav Brđanin and Momir Talić, and Prosecutor v. Milomir Stakić. From 2009 to 2012, Korner led in the prosecution in trial of Prosecutor v. Mićo Stanišić and Stojan Župljanin.

== Legal work in Bosnia and Herzegovina ==
Since 2004, Korner has worked closely with the judiciary of Bosnia and Herzegovina. From 2004 to 2005, Korner was Senior Legal Adviser to Chief Prosecutor of Bosnia and Herzegovina during establishment of War Crimes Section. In 2006, Korner was the Bosnia and Herzegovinian counsel in the International Court of Justice case of Bosnia and Herzegovina v. Serbia and Montenegro.

Korner has written numerous reports, supported by the Organization for Security and Co-operation in Europe, on the state of war crimes processing in Bosnia and Herzegovina. Korner's 2016 report entitled "Processing of War Crimes at the State Level in Bosnia and Herzegovina" was adopted by High Judicial and Prosecutorial Council of Bosnia and Herzegovina in January 2017. A follow-up report was published in 2020.

== International Criminal Court ==
In 2019, Korner was nominated to be the United Kingdom's candidate for the 2020 judicial elections of the International Criminal Court based in The Hague, Netherlands. In December 2020, Judge Korner was elected to serve as a judge of the International Criminal Court, for the term 2021–2030. She was elected in the first round.

In March 2021, Korner was officially sworn in as a judge of the International Criminal Court. In this capacity, she notably presided over the trial chamber that sentenced Janjaweed militia leader Ali Kushayb in 2025 to 20 years in prison for war crimes and crimes against humanity committed in Sudan’s Darfur region.

In April 2026, Korner was elected as the presiding judge of Trial Chamber III constituted to handle the case of former Philippines president Rodrigo Duterte.

== Honours ==
In 2004, Korner was appointed Companion of the Order of St. Michael and St. George (CMG) for services to international law.
