= Miatta Maria Samba =

Sierra Leonean judge at the International Criminal Court

Judge of the International Criminal Court
- Incumbent
- Assumed office 11 March 2021
- Nominated by: Sierra Leone
- Appointed by: Assembly of States Parties

Justice of the Supreme Court of Sierra Leone
- In office 2021

Personal details
- Born: 3 October 1971 (age 54)
- Education: University of Dundee
- Alma mater: Fourah Bay College

Miatta Maria Samba (born 3 October 1971) is a Sierra Leonian jurist and current Judge at the International Criminal Court (ICC) in The Hague, Netherlands. She was previously a judge for the Residual Special Court and Supreme Court of Sierra Leone.

== Education ==
She earned a Bachelor of Laws from the Fourah Bay College of the University of Sierra Leone and obtained a Master of Law (MSc) in Human Rights and Democratization of Africa from the Centre for Human Rights at the University of Pretoria, South Africa in 2001. In addition she also received an LL.M from the Centre for Energy, Petroleum and Mineral Law and Policy at the University of Dundee in Scotland. Since 1999 she is a member of the Bar of Sierra Leone.

== Professional career ==
Her professional career Samba began in 2002, working as a lawyer for the prosecution at the Special Court for Sierra Leone concerning crimes during the civil war in Sierra Leone. In 2003 she became a lecturer for law at the Fourah Bay College. In 2006 she left for Uganda, where she joined the countries Field Office of the International Criminal Court. Having returned to Sierra Leone in 2009, she served as a Senior Prosecutor for the Anti Corruption Commission of Sierra Leone in two occasions, once from 2010 to 2012 and also between 2014 and 2015. In 2015 she assumed as a Judge for the High Court of Sierra Leone, a post she held until March 2019. In 2019, she was elected as a Judge at the Court of Appeal in Sierra Leone. In January 2020, she was appointed as a Judge to the Residual Special Court for Sierra Leone (RSCSL) which replaced the Special Courts for Sierra Leone. The court was integrated by sixteen judges, which in part were nominated by the United Nations and six by the Government of Sierra Leone. In May 2020, Samba was nominated to the International Criminal Court (ICC) by the Government of Sierra Leone. She was elected in December 2020 and assumed in March 2021 for nine years. She presides over the chambers concerning Paul Gicheru from Kenya and Mahamat Said Abdel Kani from the Central African Republic. In February she was also appointed a judge to the Supreme Court of Sierra Leone by President Julius Maada Bio. From the post at the Supreme Court in Sierra Leone she was granted leave in August 2021.
