= Sergio Gerardo Ugalde Godínez =

Costa Rican judge at the International Criminal Court (ICC) (born 1971)

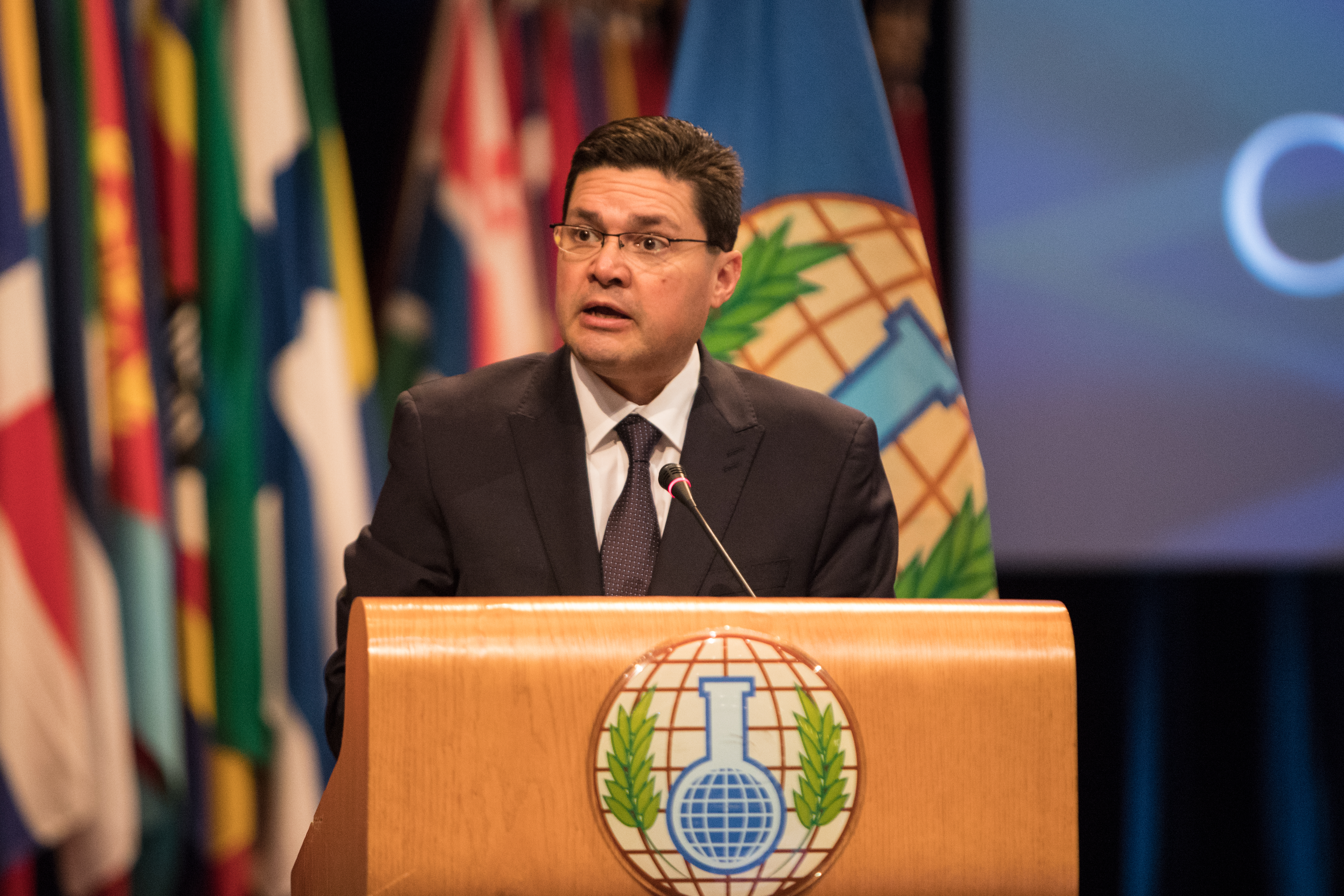
- Ugalde in 2018

Judge of the International Criminal Court
- Incumbent
- Assumed office 11 March 2021
- Nominated by: Costa Rica
- Appointed by: Assembly of States Parties

Vice-President of the Assembly of States Parties of the International Criminal Court
- In office 2016–2017
- Appointed by: Assembly of States Parties
- Preceded by: Álvaro Moerzinger
- Succeeded by: Momar Diop

Personal details
- Born: 3 April 1971 (age 55) San José, Costa Rica

Sergio Gerardo Ugalde Godínez (born 3 April 1971) is a prominent jurist and international lawyer from Costa Rica, and a current judge at the International Criminal Court (ICC). He was previously a member of the Permanent Court of Arbitration and served as the ambassador of Costa Rica to the Netherlands.

== Early life and education ==
He was born in 1971 in Costa Rica. Between 1983 and 1987 he attended Liceo San Carlos. In 1988, he began his studies of law at the University of Costa Rica, where he graduated with a Bachelor of Laws in 1994. Between 1997 and 1998 he furthered his studies at the University of Oxford, where he obtained a Magister Juris in European and Comparative Law.

== Professional career ==
Since 2000 he was employed at the Ministry of Foreign Affairs of Costa Rica as an advisor in international law, a post he kept until 2014. Between 2005 and 2015 he was entrusted the legal defense in several cases by the Government of Costa Rica. Between 2014 and 2018, he was the ambassador of Costa Rica to the Netherlands. There, he also was involved in preparing the Costa Rican defense against Nicaragua in the case about the invasion of Calero island before the ICC. He has been a member of the Permanent Court of Arbitration since 2005. Also between 2014 and 2018 he was the representative of Costa Rica before the Organisation for the Prohibition of Chemical Weapons (OPCW). He served as the vice president of the Assembly of States Parties between 2016 and 2018. Since 2019, he is an associate professor of international law at the United Nations University for Peace (UPEACE) in San Jose, Costa Rica. Sergio Gerardo Ugalde Godínez was also a contributor the newspaper La Nacion in Costa Rica.

== Judge at the International Criminal Court ==
On 21 December 2020, Sergio Gerardo Ugalde Godínez was elected in the fourth round to the International Criminal Court by the Assembly of States Parties. In March 2023, Russia initiated an investigation against the judges of the ICC Ugalde Godínez, Tomoko Akane and Rosario Salvatore Aitala after the ICC issued an arrest warrant against its president Vladimir Putin.
