= Emmanuel Yaw Benneh =

Ghanaian lawyer

- Born: Emmanuel Yaw Benneh; April 30, 1954 (age 72); Berekum
- Died: September 11, 2020 (aged 66); Adjiriganor, Accra-Ghana
- Cause of death: Murder
- Citizenship: Ghanaian
- Education: University of Ghana, University of Cambridge
- Occupations: Lawyer, Law Professor
- Parent: Isaac William Benneh
- Relatives: George Benneh

Emmanuel Yaw Benneh (30 April 1954 – 11 September 2020) was a Ghanaian law professor, lawyer and a senior lecturer at the University of Ghana School of Law. He was murdered at his home on 11 September 2020.

== Early life and education ==
Yaw Benneh was born on 30 April 1954 to his father Isaac William Benneh then Minister of Rural Industries in the Kwame Nkrumah government in Berekum in the Bono Region of Ghana.

He attended the University of Ghana School of Law from 1973-76 for his LL.B degree. He later attended the University of Cambridge for his LL.M in International Law and was later awarded an M.Litt at the same university.

== Career ==
He was a lawyer called to the Ghanaian Bar and a law Professor at the University of Ghana School of Law. Yaw Benneh was a member of the Editorial Board of the University of Ghana Law Journal, the African Society of International and Comparative Law, the Ghana Bar Association, the Ghana Science Association and the Institute of International Negotiations.

== Murder ==
Yaw Benneh was murdered on 11 September 2020 in his home in Adjiriganor located in East Legon in the Capital of Ghana Accra. He was found in the early hours of 12 September 2020 lying dead in a pool of blood with his hands tied behind his back and the legs tied in a prone position.
