= Althea Violet Alexis-Windsor =

Trinidad and Tobago judge (born 1973)

Her Honour Judge Althea Violet Alexis-Windsor

Judge of the International Criminal Court
- Incumbent
- Assumed office 11 March 2021
- Nominated by: Trinidad and Tobago
- Appointed by: Assembly of States Parties

Personal details
- Born: 22 June 1973 (age 53) Trinidad and Tobago
- Education: University of the West Indies, Hugh Wooding Law School
- Occupation: Attorney, judge

Althea Violet Alexis-Windsor (born 22 June 1973), is a Judge of the International Criminal Court. She has been a high court judge of Trinidad and Tobago.

== Early life ==
In 1989, she received her graduation from Vessigny Government School. She was honored to deliver the valedictorian speech. In 1991, she finished from St. Joseph's Convent in San Fernando, Trinidad and Tobago with GCE Advanced Level.

== Legal career ==
In 1994, Althea Alexis-Windsor received her Bachelor of Laws and Letters (LLB) degree from the University of the West Indies. In 1996, she finished from Hugh Wooding Law School with the Commonwealth Caribbean's Legal Education Certificate. After holding positions as associate attorney at law and junior counsel in two law chambers (law firms), in 1998 she was appointed state counsel I. In 2000 / 2001 she went to Utrecht for a Master of Law and Letters (LLM) class. She graduated magna cum laude. After a year as Deputy Director of the Ministry of the Attorney General's Human Rights Unit, she returned to the Office of the Director of Public Prosecutions and became a Senior State Counsel.

From 2004 to 2013 she joined the International Criminal Tribunal for Rwanda, beginning as an Assistant Trial Counsel, she progressed to a Trial Counsel position, and became an Appeals Counsel.

In September 2013, she was appointed judge of the High Court of Trinidad and Tobago, " adjudicating on complex matters of criminal law and procedure in pretrial submissions and on-going trials of murder, sexual offences and narcotics. " and therefore also of the Supreme Court. (Note: In the Judiciary of Trinidad and Tobago, the Supreme Court is built up from the High Court and the Court of Appeals. See Constitution section 99: "The Judicature: The Supreme Court (Constitution Chapter 7, Part 1, Section 99)". Constitution of Trinidad and Tobago. Political Database of the Americas, Georgetown University.)

On 23 December 2020, she was elected Judge of the International Criminal Court. She entered office 11 March 2021. In her application speech in the ICC-ASP "public roundtable" discussion she named three "I-believes": "I believe in the ability of the law to help build fearless and justice in a society. I believe that with international criminal law this ability becomes ~Word not understood~ large. I believe that the International Criminal Court is the vehicle that will positively affect national jurisdictions by strengthening local criminal capacity and encouraging international respect for the rule of law. Therein lies the source of my passion."
