= Isaac William Benneh =

Ghanaian politician (1912–??)

Minister for Rural Industries
- In office 15 April 1965 – 24 February 1966
- President: Dr. Kwame Nkrumah
- Preceded by: John Young Ghann
- Succeeded by: Ministry abolished

Member of Parliament for Berekum Constituency
- In office 25 April 1957 – 24 February 1966
- Preceded by: J. G. Awuah
- Succeeded by: Samuel Hene Addae

Personal details
- Born: 12 May 1912
- Citizenship: Ghanaian
- Party: Convention People's Party
- Children: George Benneh, Emmanuel Yaw Benneh

Isaac William Benneh was a Ghanaian politician. He served as a minister of state in various portfolios in the First Republic from 1960 to 1966. He also served as the member of the Berekum constituency from 1957 to 1966.

== Early life and education ==
Benneh was born on 12 May 1912 at Berekum in the Bono Region of Ghana. He had his elementary education at Berekum and Abetifi where he obtained his Standard 7 certificate in 1930.

== Career ==
After receiving two years training with Cadbury and Fry Company, Benneh became a cocoa broker for the Company in 1933. He rose through the ranks and became a supervisor of the company in 1951. While working with the company, he also run his own transport business.

== Politics ==
Upon the death of J. G. Awuah, the then sitting Convention People's Party (CPP) member for the Berekum constituency, the Berekum seat was vacant and a by-election was held on 25 April 1957. Benneh contested for the seat and won on the ticket of the CPP. After winning the election, he was appointed General Manager of the Ghana Farmer's Cooperative. In October 1959, he was a appointed Ministerial Secretary to the Ministry of Economic Affairs and held this appointment until June, 1960. In August 1960, he was transferred to the Ministry of Labour, Co-operatives and Social Welfare serving in that same capacity. That same year, Benneh was elevated to the rank of a minister of state given the Portfolio of Education. He held this appointment for a period of four years until he was transferred to the Ministry of Communications. On 15 April 1965 he was appointed Minister for Rural Industries, replacing John Young Ghann who had then been made Minister for Internal Trade. Benneh remained in this capacity until 24 February 1966 when the Nkrumah government was overthrown.

== Personal life ==
Benneh was married to Mrs. Lucy Benneh (née Ofori-Atta) in 1959. Lucy was a clerical officer in the Ministry of Labour from 1957 until 1958 when she was moved to the Broadcasting Department working in the same capacity. She however, resigned in 1961. Prior to his marriage to Lucy, Benneh had married ten times and had forty-two children with the ten women. He was father of the Ghanaian academic and university administrator, George Benneh who served as the Vice-Chancellor of the University of Ghana from 1992 to 1996.

He was also the father of Emmanuel Yaw Benneh, who was a Law Professor with the University of Ghana. He is known to be deceased.

== See also ==
- List of MLAs elected in the 1956 Gold Coast legislative election
- List of MPs elected in the 1965 Ghanaian parliamentary election
