= Manuel Herrera Carbuccia =

Manuel Ramón Herrera Carbuccia (born September 28, 1957) is a judge, lawyer, and teacher from the Dominican Republic. Since 22 December 2011 he has been a justice of the Supreme Court of the Dominican Republic.

== Biography ==
Herrera Carbuccia comes from a family of lawyers, medics, musicians and poets. He is son of Mercedes Luisa Carbuccia Montalvo, one of the first women to graduate as Doctor of Medicine in San Pedro de Macorís, and Abelardo Herrera Peña, justice of the Supreme Court of the Dominican Republic.

He has three sisters: Dora Rosanna Herrera Carbuccia, especialized en Pediatrics; Olga Venecia Herrera Carbuccia, judge of the International Criminal Court in The Hague; and Vanesa Margarita Herrera Carbuccia, a lawyer specialized in municipal issues.

Herrera has three children: Jessica, Mercedes Paola, and Manuel de Jesús Herrera.
