= Íñigo Salvador Crespo =

Ecuadorian lawyer and magistrate (born 1960)

Íñigo Salvador Crespo (born 20 October 1960) is an Ecuadorian lawyer and magistrate.

== Education ==
He obtained law degrees from the Pontificia Universidad Católica del Ecuador in 1985 and 1987. He went on to obtain a master's in international relations from the Universidad Andina Simón Bolívar, and a Diplôme d'Études Supérieures in international law from the Graduate Institute of International Studies in 1994.

== Career ==
=== Legal career ===
From 2018 to 2022, he was the State Attorney General of Ecuador. In January 2023, he became chief magistrate of the Court of Justice of the Andean Community. Also in 2023, he became Ecuador's chief magistrate.

He was a professor of law at the Pontifical Catholic University of Ecuador's law faculty from 2009 to 2018, including a stint as dean of that from 2016 to 2018.

=== Literary career ===
In 2022, he published the historic novel 1822, whose plot takes place during the Battle of Pichincha.
