= Chile Eboe-Osuji =

President of the ICC from 2018 to 2021

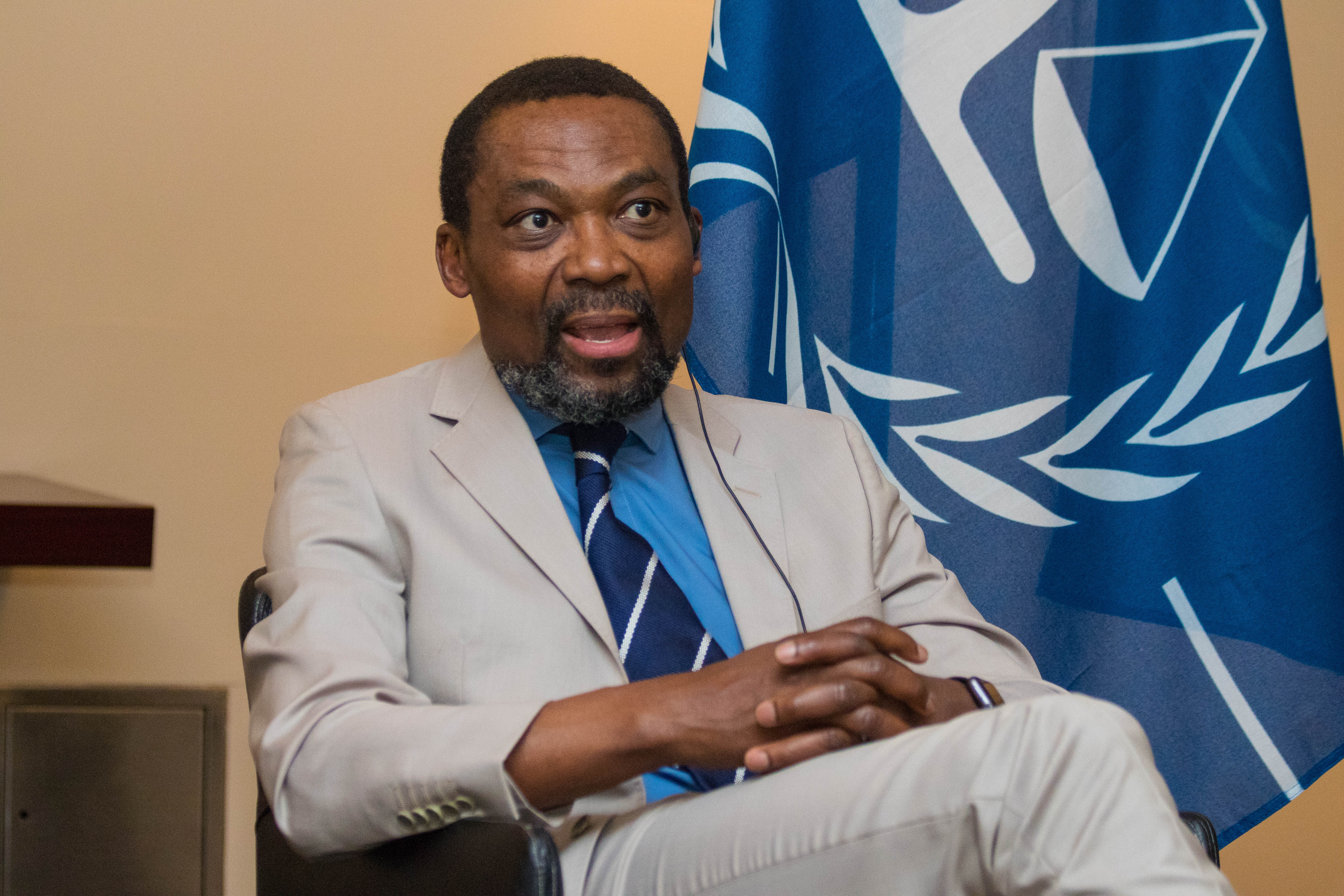

4th President of the International Criminal Court
- In office 11 March 2018 – 10 March 2021
- Appointed by: Judges of the ICC
- Preceded by: Silvia Fernández de Gurmendi
- Succeeded by: Piotr Hofmański

Judge of the International Criminal Court
- In office 11 March 2012 – 10 March 2021
- Nominated by: Nigeria
- Appointed by: Assembly of States Parties

Personal details
- Born: 2 September 1962 (age 64) Anara, Nigeria
- Education: University of Calabar; McGill University; University of Amsterdam
- Occupation: Judge

Chile Eboe-Osuji (born 2 September 1962) is a Nigerian jurist. He is an incoming Judge of the Caribbean Court of Justice, an International Jurist at the Lincoln Alexander School of Law, a Special Advisor to the President's Office at Toronto Metropolitan University, and a Member of the Media Freedom Coalition's High Level Panel of Legal Experts on Media Freedom. Eboe-Osuji served as the President of the International Criminal Court (ICC), The Hague from March 2018 to March 2021. The Nigerian-born Eboe-Osuji was also concurrently serving as a senior judge in the Appeals Division of the ICC during this time.

In his role at the Lincoln Alexander School of Law, Eboe-Osuji leads discussions on the international human rights regime, the international humanitarian law regime, the role of international courts and tribunals, and the rule of law.

Prior to his work with the International Criminal Court, he was the Legal Advisor to the United Nations High Commissioner for Human Rights in Geneva. He also served at various times as a senior prosecutor at both the International Criminal Tribunal for Rwanda and the Special Court for Sierra Leone.

== Early life and education ==
Eboe-Osuji was born in Anara, in what is now Isiala Mbano, Imo State, Nigeria, on 2 September 1962. He obtained his bachelor of laws degree from the University of Calabar, Nigeria, master of laws degree from McGill University, Montreal, Quebec, Canada, and doctor of laws degree from the University of Amsterdam, the Netherlands.

== Career ==
Eboe-Osuji was called to the Nigerian Bar in 1986 and practised briefly there. After obtaining his master of laws degree from McGill in 1991, he worked as a barrister in Canada, having been called to the Bar in Ontario and in British Columbia in 1993.

From 1997 to 2005, Eboe-Osuji worked at the International Criminal Tribunal for Rwanda as prosecution counsel and senior legal officer to the judges of the tribunal. From 2005 to 2007, he worked in Canada as a barrister and law lecturer. Working for the Special Court for Sierra Leone as senior prosecution appeals counsel in 2007/08 and returning to the ICTR from 2008 to 2010 as Head of Chambers, he became the Legal Advisor to the United Nations High Commissioner for Human Rights Navi Pillay in 2010, and held a cross-appointment as the principal prosecution appeals counsel at the Special Court for Sierra Leone, in the case of Charles Taylor, the former President of Liberia. He has authored two books and numerous law journal articles in international law.

== Judge of the International Criminal Court, 2012–2021 ==
On 16 December 2011, Eboe-Osuji was elected as a judge of the International Criminal Court. He won the office in the fifteenth ballot in the Assembly of States Parties. He took office on 11 March 2012.

From September 2013, Eboe-Osuji – alongside Judges Olga Venecia Herrera Carbuccia and Robert Fremr – presided over the trial against Deputy President William Ruto of Kenya, who was accused of stoking a wave of killing for political gain after the country's contested 2007 elections. Early on, he warned Kenyan media and bloggers that anyone revealing the identity of a protected witness at the Ruto trial could be guilty of contempt of court; ICC chief prosecutor Fatou Bensouda had previously complained that some witnesses were being intimidated in Kenya, some of whom withdrew from the case.

Following Eboe-Osuji's own request, the Presidency of the ICC decided to reconstitute Trial Chamber V(b) in the trial against Uhuru Muigai Kenyatta and replace him with Judge Geoffrey Henderson in early 2014. However, Eboe-Osuji remained the Presiding Judge in Trial Chamber V(a) which continued to hear the case against Ruto and former Kass FM broadcaster Joshua Sang until his term at the court ended in 2021. In April 2014, his chamber issued subpoenas for several prosecution witnesses no longer willing to testify in the case. Shortly after, Eboe-Osuji told off the government of Kenya for turning to the principle of sovereignty "at every convenient opportunity, with the evident aim of frightening judges".

== Judge of the Caribbean Court of Justice, 2025– ==
On 24 March 2025, it was announced that Eboe-Osuji was selected as a Judge of the Caribbean Court of Justice (CCJ) to replace Judge Andrew Burgess, who is set to retire on 11 April 2025. It is expected that Eboe-Osuji will be sworn in as a Judge of the CCJ in April 2025. The CCJ is an international court that serves both to interpret, apply, and resolve disputes arising under the Treaty of Chaguaramas and as the final court of appeal in civil and criminal matters for Member States of the Caribbean Community and Common Market that have amended their constitutions to allow the CCJ to play such a role. As of 2025, the CCJ serves as the final court of appeal for Barbados, Belize, Dominica, Guyana, and Saint Lucia.

== Other activities ==
- On 28 April 2022, Eboe-Osuji joined The Right Honourable Kim Campbell, The Right Honourable Beverley McLachlin and The Honourable Bob Rae on a panel to discuss "Canada's Place on the World Stage".
- Distinguished International Jurist (Lincoln Alexander School of Law at Toronto Metropolitan University)
- International Gender Champions (IGC), Member
