= Ishaq Bello =

Nigerian jurist

Ishaq Usman Bello
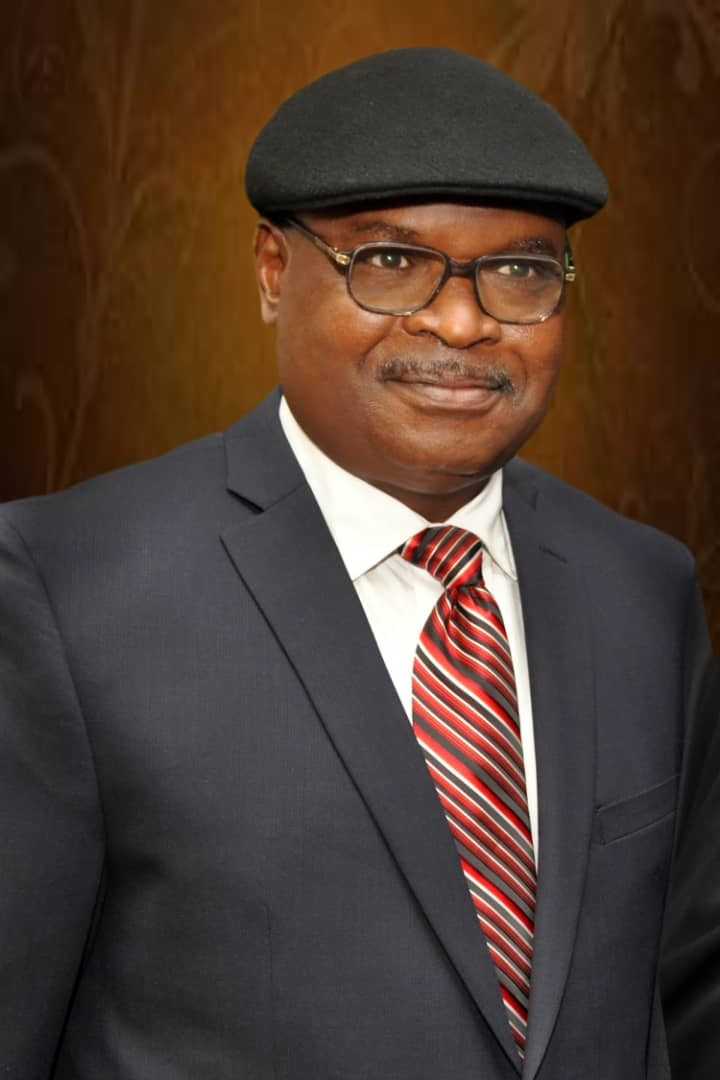

Chief Judge of the Federal Capital Territory (FCT)
- Incumbent
- Assumed office 31 March 2015
- Appointed by: Goodluck Jonathan
- Preceded by: Ibrahim Bukar

Personal details
- Born: 5 January 1956 (age 70) Zaria, Kaduna State, Nigeria
- Education: Ahmadu Bello University
- Occupation: Jurist; Lawyer

Justice Ishaq Usman Bello (born 5 January 1956) is a Nigerian jurist, the Chief Judge of the Federal Capital Territory (FCT), Abuja, and Nigeria's nominated candidate for the 2020 judicial elections of the International Criminal Court based in The Hague, Netherlands. He is better known for his effort towards decongesting several prisons, now known as correctional facilities, in Nigeria.

During the earlier part of his career, Bello was, for official reasons, off and on the bench. In November 1984, he left private practice to become a state counsel at the Kaduna State Ministry of Justice and it took him until the following year to become a magistrate.

He then left the bench after serving as a magistrate for two years. He was temporarily transferred and appointed as the Head of Legal Recovery department at the then Universal Bank of Nigeria plc between 1987 and 1989.

In 1993, he joined the Board of River Basin Authority in Minna, Niger State, as a secretary and legal adviser. His stint as legal adviser to the board ended in 1995 and after this, Bello's stint as a federal attorney began following his appointment as a deputy chief registrar of the Supreme Court of Nigeria.

== Early life ==
Ishaq Usman Bello was born in Zaria, Kaduna State, in 1956. He spent his earliest years at the St Bartholomew Primary Wusasa in Zaria in 1965 before moving to L.E.A Primary School T/Jukun Zaria, where he obtained his first school leaving certificate in 1972.

After obtaining his certificate, he left for Katsina State, where he earned his West Africa School Certificate (WASC) in 1976. He then returned to Zaria following his admission into the Ahmadu Bello University (ABU), where he graduated with an LLB (Hons) in 1982. He was called to bar in 1983.

Bello holds a PhD (LLD Honoris Causa) from the Caribbean University.

== Career ==
Ishaq Usman Bello began his legal practice at a private law firm, Umaru Yabo & co, in Sokoto State. After a year, he was appointed as a state counsel at the Kaduna State Ministry of Justice. Then he went on to become a state magistrate, a position he held between 1985 and 1987.

Following his first temporary transfer which happened between 1987 and 1989, Bello returned to the bench in 1990 to serve as acting chief magistrate and then later as chief magistrate in 1992, after which he went on another temporary transfer to join the Board of River Basin Authority in Minna, Niger State, as a secretary and legal adviser.

=== High court judge (1997 – 2014) ===
Bello began his journey as a federal attorney in 1995 following his appointment as a deputy chief registrar of the Supreme Court of Nigeria. He served for another two years before he was then appointed as a judge of the High Court of the Federal Capital Territory (FCT) in 1997.

During this period, Bello presided over several high-profile cases, including the State vs Francis Okoye and Others following an assassination attempt on the life of the late Dora Akunyili, the then director-general of the National Agency for Food and Drug Administration and Control (NAFDAC).

He also presided over the "Apo Six" case starting from 2005. The case, which was called Nigeria's "most infamous case of extrajudicial killing" by the BBC, cost six young civilians their lives. In 2017, Judge Bello convicted two police officers over their involvement in the murder of two out of the six civilians.

"The two defendants have no regard for the sanctity of human lives," Judge Bello was quoted by AFP news agency as telling the court. "They are not only over-zealous but also extremely reckless."

=== Acting Chief Judge of the FCT (2015 – 2015) ===
On 31 March 2015, Bello was sworn in as the Acting Chief Judge of the FCT following the retirement of the former FCT chief judge, Justice Ibrahim Bukar. While conducting the swearing-in ceremony, the Chief Justice of Nigeria (CJN) Mahmud Mohammed challenged him to uphold the tenets of the court and make sure justice was properly administered to everyone, no matter their standing in the society.

Justice Ishaq Bello's appointment as the substantive Chief Judge of the Federal Capital Territory was confirmed on 28 May 2015.

=== Chief Judge of the FCT (2015 – 2021) ===
As the Chief Judge of the FCT, Bello paid attention to the de-congestion of prisons in Abuja. He started visiting prisons within his jurisdiction, releasing over forty awaiting trial prisoners in the process.

By the end of October 2017, he was appointed as the chairman of the Presidential Committee on Prison Reforms and De-congestion, now Presidential Committee on Correctional Service Reforms and De-congestion, by the Minister of Justice and Attorney General of the Federation, Abubakar Malami. The committee's responsibility was to lead the reform processes of the Nigerian prison system.

Since the inauguration of the committee, over 3768 inmates have been released from 36 correctional facilities nationwide.

== Influences ==
Bello created enforcement procedure rules for the Child Right Act in 2015. The provisions set out implementation guidelines for cases involving children, making court proceedings more humane and sensitive to the needs of children.

He was also the head of the committee that came up with the Administration of Criminal Justice (ACJ) act, which has now been recommended for adoption by all states in Nigeria.

== Accomplishment ==
Ishaq Bello was made Life Bencher by the Nigerian Body of Benchers in 2019.

== International Criminal Court ==
Bello has been nominated to be Nigeria's candidate for the 2020 judicial elections of the International Criminal Court based in The Hague, Netherlands.He fluffed Nigeria chance at the Hague with his poor performance. He was ranked low by the Hague.

== Memberships ==
- Member, National Judicial Council
- Member, Nigerian Body of Benchers
- Member, Nigerian Bar Association

== Publications ==
- Paper on "Judicial Integrity" presented at UNODC- Vienna- representing Nigeria (2012)
- "Comparative Analysis of the Penal Code, The Criminal Code, The Criminal Procedure Act of the Northern and Southern States" (delivered at the Nigerian Law School).
- Bench Book of Best Practices (2017).
