= Court of Justice of the Andean Community =

- Spanish: Tribunal de Justicia de la Comunidad Andina
- Established: 1984
- Jurisdiction: Andean Community member states
- Location: Quito, Ecuador
- Judge term length: 6 years
- Number of positions: 4
- Website: www.tribunalandino.org.ec

President
- Currently: Hernán Rodrigo Romero Zambrano

The Court of Justice of the Andean Community was founded in 1979 by the Cartagena Agreement and began operating in January 1984 in Quito, Ecuador; it was originally known as the Andean Pact.

The Andean Community is a sub-regional economic and social integration bloc comprising four member states: Bolivia, Colombia, Ecuador, and Peru, along with Chile and the Mercosur states as associate members. The Mercosur States are Argentina, Brazil, Paraguay, and Uruguay.

Since 1969, the area underwent numerous changes, including the formation of a free trade area. In 1996, the members decided to reform the Cartagena Agreement and introduced the Protocol of Trujillo, which created several changes. The Andean Community was created and replaced the Andean Pact. The Andean Integration System (AIS) was also created. "The main bodies of the AIS currently include: the Andean Council of Presidents; Andean Council of Foreign Affairs Ministers; Andean Community Commission; Andean Community Secretariat-General; Andean Parliament; Andean Development Corporation; Latin American Reserve Fund; and the Andean Community Tribunal of Justice.

== Jurisdiction ==
The ATJ is a single instance court, composed of one judge from each member state, which has exclusive jurisdiction over the Andean Community treaties and decisions of the Council of Foreign Ministers, Commission as well as Resolutions of the Secretariat General. The ATJ is able to hear cases involving "failure to fulfill obligations, annulment, failure to act, preliminary rulings, voluntary arbitration, and has an administrative jurisdiction over employees of the community's institutions". All of the decisions of the court are final and binding once the decision is published in the Official Gazette of the Cartagena Agreement.

"There are two forms of preliminary rulings: optional references from lower courts and mandatory references from courts of last instance." Preliminary references do not suspend national proceedings; "this suspensory effect only applies if the reference to the ATJ is from a court of last instance." Pursuant to an optional reference ("consulta facultativa"), if the ATJ does not render its preliminary ruling before the national court's decision is due, the national court may rule without waiting for the ATJ to issue its ruling. This set-up certainly ensures that the ATJ's docket is not overwhelmed by preliminary references from perhaps more "curious" lower courts. However, despite avoiding unduly long proceedings, it may perhaps be self-defeating, as it delays the ATJ from addressing difficult issues.

Until 31 December 2013, the Court has 2,444 known preliminary interpretations requested by national judges, 119 infringement actions against Member Countries, 54 actions for nullity, 17 business processes and 6 for failure to inactivity Community bodies, ranking as the third most active international court in the world after the European Court of Human Rights and the European Court of Justice.

== Judges ==
Judges are selected thorough a process involving the four member states where "each member state presents a list of three candidates and the judges are selected from those lists by unanimous decision of the member states". Qualified "candidates must possess a good moral reputation and be competent to exercise the highest judicial roles in their respective countries or be highly competent jurists". The judges are appointed for a six-year term, which is renewable once. The function of the Court's president rotates annually and a provision is made for the creation of an advocate-general.

== Cases ==
"Any activity related to the actions of nullity and infringement, the action for failure or downtime and labor-related claims will start by application signed by the party and his lawyer, addressed to the President of the Court and filed with the Secretary original and three copies. Also, the demand may be sent via facsimile, mail or electronically with due support confirmation of receipt by the Tribunal."

"In this case, the claimant shall within three days to submit by the original mailing application and its attachments. Otherwise, the application shall be deemed not filed. In the event that the application does not appear personally before the court, and when the applicant is a natural or legal person, the signatures of the party or its legal representative and attorney, shall be duly acknowledged before a notary or judge the member country concerned."

== See also ==
- Andean Community

== Bibliography ==
- Mackenzie, Ruth; Romano, Cesare; Sands, Philippe, eds. (2010). The Manual on International Courts and Tribunals. Oxford, UK: Oxford University Press. ISBN 978-0199545278.
- Romano, Cesare; Alter, Karen; Shany, Yuval, eds. (2014). The Oxford University Press Handbook of International Adjudication. Oxford, UK: Oxford University Press. ISBN 978-0199660681.
- "Presentación" (in Spanish). Andean Court.
