= Péter Kovács (lawyer) =

Hungarian jurist

Judge of the International Criminal Court
- In office 11 March 2015 – 24 July 2025
- Nominated by: Hungary
- Appointed by: Assembly of States Parties

Personal details
- Born: 10 February 1959 (age 67) Szeged, Hungary

Péter Kovács (born 10 February 1959 in Szeged, Hungary) is a Hungarian professor of international law at the Peter Pazmany Catholic University, where he was the head of the Public International Law Department and the Doctoral School. Kovács was a judge at the Constitutional Court of Hungary from 2005 to 2014. Previously he served as a diplomat at the Embassy of Hungary in Paris and as the head of the Department for Human Rights and Minority Protection in the Hungarian Ministry of Foreign Affairs. Kovács was elected as a judge on the International Criminal Court (ICC) in the 2014 election of judges by the Assembly of State Parties. His nine-year term at the ICC ended in March 2024, but he continued in office until July 2025 pursuant to Article 36 (10) of the Rome Statute to complete the trial of Alfred Yekatom and Patrice-Edouard Ngaïssona.

After the end of his ICC judiciary functions, he went back to the Péter Pázmány Catholic University where he received a 3 year mandate to lead again the Doctoral School.

Kovács graduated from the Faculty of Law of József Attila University (Szeged, Hungary) in 1983. After his studies at the European University Centre in Nancy, France, in 1983/84, he received his LLM degree specialized in community law. Later, for his thesis entitled 'Protection of fundamental rights in the system of community law' (i.e. today: EU law), 1987, he was awarded the title of “doctor universitatis” at the University of Miskolc, recognized as a Ph.D. degree in 1996. He qualified as a university lecturer in 1997. (Doctor habil) and in 2011, he received the Doctor of Science (DSc) title from the Hungarian Academy of Sciences. From 1983 he was assistant, then senior lecturer, and from 1998 university professor, between 1999 and 2005 head of Department for International Law at Miskolc. Kovács was granted full professorship, and between 1997 and 2005 he was head of Department at Peter Pazmany.

Between 1990 and 1994, Kovács worked at the Embassy of the Republic of Hungary to Paris, within the staff of the Ministry of Foreign Affairs, while in 1998/99 he was head of Department for Human Rights and Minority Law. In his quality of governmental expert, he took part in the elaboration of two conventions on the protection of minorities, concluded under the auspices of the Council of Europe, namely the European Charter for Regional or Minority Languages and the Framework Convention for the Protection of National Minorities.

As a visiting professor, Kovács gave lectures at several universities in France: University of Montpellier (one month in 2000), Paris-Sud (one month in 2002), Panthéon-Assas (one month in 2003), University of Nantes (one month in 2003); in Regensburg (Germany) 2012 and in Leuven (Belgium) in 2015 as well as in the United States (six months in 2002, Denver, Fulbright scholarship). He is a member of the Société Française pour le Droit International. and of the Hungarian Branch of the International Law Association.

His main books are as follows:

Authored books:

1. - The jurisprudential practice of the International Criminal Court: As I saw it, Miskolc - Budapest, Central European Academic Publishing (2025)

2. - L'individu et sa position devant la Cour pénale internationale, The Hague, Brill - Nijhoff (2023)

3. - Introduction á la Jurisprudence de la Cour Constitutionnelle de la République de Hongrie: Approche thématique, Regensburg, Universitätsverlag Regensburg (2011)

4. - La protection internationale des minorités nationales aux alentours du millénaire, Paris, Éditions Pedone (2005)

5. - International law and minority protection: Rights of Minorities or Law of Minorities? Budapest, Akadémiai Kiadó (2000)

6. - Le droit international pour les minorités face á l´État-nation, Miskolc, Miskolci Egyetemi Kiadó (2000)

Edited books:

1. - The Universal Protection of Human Rights Budapest, University of Miskolc, Central European Academy (2026), (Co-editor: Béres, Nóra),

2. - Le concept de la citoyenneté en droit international - The Concept of Citizenship in International Law, Leiden, Brill - Nijhoff (2018) , (Co-editor: Mouton, Jean-Denis)

3. - International Law: a Quiet Strength = Le droit international: une force tranquille: Miscellanea in memoriam Géza Herczegh, Budapest, Péter Pázmány Catholic University, (2011)

4. - Minorités et droit international = Minorities and international law: Actes du Colloque international de la Faculté de droit de l'Université de Miskolc, or. le 4 avril 2008 sur la protection internationale des minorités nationales = Proceedings of the International Colloquium organized on April 4, 2008 by the Faculty of Law of the University of Miskolc about the International Protection of National Minorities, Miskolc, Bíbor Kiadó (2008)

5. - Historia ante portas: L’histoire en droit international / History in International Law, Miskolc, Bíbor Kiadó (2004)

6. - Le droit international au tournant du millénaire - l'approche hongroise; International Law at the turn of the millennium - the Hungarian approach, Budapest, Pázmány Péter Catholic University (2000)

7. - Perspectives d´intégration des pays d´Europe centrale et orientale aux institutions de l´Europe occidentale, Paris, Montchrétien, (1998) (Co-editor: Daillier, Patrick )
