= George Benneh =

Ghanaian academic and politician (1934–2021)

George Benneh FGA, OSG

Vice-Chancellor of the University of Ghana
- In office 1992–1996
- Preceded by: Akilagpa Sawyerr
- Succeeded by: Ivan Addae Mensah

Minister for Finance and Economic Planning
- In office May 1981 – 31 December 1981
- President: Hilla Limann
- Preceded by: Amon Nikoi
- Succeeded by: Kwesi Botchwey

Commissioner and Minister of Lands, Natural Resources, Fuel and Power
- In office 1979 – May 1981
- President: Fred Akuffo; Jerry Rawlings; Hilla Limann

Personal details
- Born: George Kwabena Effah Benneh; 6 March 1934 Jamdede, Berekum, Gold Coast
- Died: 11 February 2021 (aged 86) Accra, Ghana
- Parent(s): Isaac William Benneh (father); Theresa Ammea (mother)
- Education: Achimota College; University College of Ghana / University of London (BA); London School of Economics (PhD)

Academic work
- Discipline: Geography; Resource development
- Institutions: University of Ghana, Legon

George Kwabena Effah Benneh FGA, OSG (6 March 1934 – 11 February 2021) was a Ghanaian geographer, academic and university administrator who served as the Vice-Chancellor of the University of Ghana, Legon from 1992 to 1996. He was a professor and later an emeritus professor of Geography and Resource Development at the same university. Benneh was Minister of Lands, Natural Resources, Fuel and Power from 1979 to May 1981 and Minister of Finance from May 1981 to December 1981 under Hilla Limann during the Third Republic. Before this, Benneh has served as Commissioner for Lands, Natural Resources, Fuel and Power under the SMC II and AFRC regimes.

== Early life and education ==
A member of the Bono ethnic group, George Benneh was born on 6 March 1934 in the small town of Jamdede, about a kilometre from Berekum on the then Gold Coast, now Ghana. His father was Isaac William Benneh, a Convention People's Party politician during the First Republic under the Nkrumah government, who served as the Minister for Rural Industries and the Member of Parliament for Berekum. His mother was Theresa Ammea, a farmer and a kenkey trader. During his childhood, together with his younger brother, Stephen, he assisted his mother in her trade and spent his school vacations helping out on a cocoa farm his family owned at Prusu. On the way to the farm early in the mornings, he and his family stopped along the way to have a palm soup meal as the journey was long.

Raised a Roman Catholic, Benneh had his primary and middle education at the Berekum Catholic Primary and Middle Schools from 1941 and 1949, culminating in the Common Entrance Examination towards the end of 1949. Benneh studied at Achimota College during his secondary years from 1950 and 1956 where he obtained the GCE Ordinary Level (1954) and GCE Advanced Level (1956) certificates. As a student, George Benneh served as the Catholic Chapel Prefect, working closely with the parish chaplain. At Achimota, his nickname was “Anago”, an allusion to his athletic prowess. At the age of 14, while in Form Three, he led the Achimota Athletics Team to compete with Kings College, a notable secondary school in Lagos, Nigeria. He also won the 800-yard race during the Inter-College Games at the Accra Sports Stadium.

In 1957, he was among 4 students who were selected nationally and awarded the Shell Ghana Independence Scholarship for university studies at the University College of Ghana, then a constituent college of the University of London from where he received a Bachelor of Arts degree in Geography in 1960. At Legon, he captained the University of Ghana Athletics Team from 1958 to 1959. Between 1961 and 1964, he did his postgraduate studies at the London School of Economics, after which he was awarded a PhD in Geography.

== Career ==
=== Academia ===
At the beginning of his career, just before his doctoral studies, he taught geography at Achimota School in 1961. Benneh was appointed a lecturer in the Department of Geography at the University of Ghana, Legon in 1964, Senior Lecturer in 1973, Associate Professor in 1976 and Full Professor in 1989. As a university administrator, he served as the chairman of the Department of Geography and Resource Development, senior tutor of the Commonwealth Hall, Dean of the Faculty of Social Studies and Pro-Vice-Chancellor, Director of Population Impact Project funded by the USAID. Benneh was appointed a Vice-Chancellor of the University of Ghana in 1992 and retired in 1996. Benneh became an emeritus professor of Geography and Resource Development after his stint as a vice-chancellor. He stated that in his academic career, he largely self-funded his own research projects.

Additionally, he was a visiting fellow at the Institute of Geography, University of Copenhagen, Denmark in 1973, 1983 and in 1996. In 1982, he was a Senior Fulbright Hays Visiting Professor at the Department of Geography at the University of Pittsburgh and also, Visiting Professor, Department of Geography and Research Associate at the Centre for Research on Economic Development, University of Michigan, Ann Arbor.

Under the auspices of the American Association of State Colleges and Universities, he was a distinguished visiting professor and guest speaker at the 50th Anniversary of the Fulbright Hayes Fellowship Anniversary Conference in Atlanta, in 1996. In 1997, he was the John Cadbury Fellow at the Centre for West African Studies at the University of Birmingham, and a Visiting Lecturer, Department of Geography, University of New England, Armidale, New South Wales, Australia.

=== Foray into politics ===
George Benneh was appointed the Commissioner for Lands, Natural Resources, Fuel and Power from 1979 to 1981. Concurrently, he was the Minister of Lands, Natural Resources, Fuel and Power. Between May and December 1981, he served as the Minister of Finance and Economic Planning under Hilla Limann. After the June 1979 and December 1981 coups d’état, both led by Jerry John Rawlings, he was jailed without trial by the junta on allegations of corruption. He spent a total of ten weeks in prison before being set free by the coup leadership as military investigators had been unable to adduce any evidence of malfeasance. In an interview with the national newspaper, Daily Graphic, he described his prison experience as humiliating, adding that "If you have not been deprived of your freedom, you will not appreciate what freedom is."

== Other activities ==
=== Consultancies ===
George Benneh consulted for many international organisations including the World Bank, United Nations, the Food and Agriculture Organisation (FAO), United Nations Economic Commission for Africa, UNESCO, United Nations University in Tokyo, UNFPA, Catholic University Louvain in Belgium, Moscow State University, Russia, and the Centre for Development Studies, Trivandrum, Kerala, India. Benneh was the Team Leader of UNFPA Population Review and Strategy Development Mission to the Republic of Tanzania in 1991, member of the United Nations University Feasibility Team for the establishment of Research and Training Centre at Lucerne, Switzerland in 1998, and member of the United Nations University International Feasibility Study Group for Research and Training Centre on Nature and Human Security in Bonn, Germany in 2000.

=== National Boards and Committees ===
- 1969 – 1971 - President of the Amalgamated Sports Club of the University of Ghana
- 1972 – 1974 – Member, Board of Directors of Graphic Corporation of Ghana
- 1974 – 1978 - Member, Sunyani Diocesan Catholic Laity Council and the First Secretary of the Ghana National Catholic Laity Council
- 1980 – Co-chairman of Planning Committee on the Papal visit to Ghana by John Paul II
- 1982 - President of Ghana Tae Kwan Do
- 1988 – 1992 – chairman, Board of Directors of Bank of Ghana
- 1993 – Member of National Development Planning Commission
- 1997 – 2002 – chairman, Ghana National Population Council
- 1997 – 2002 – chairman, National Council for Tertiary Education
- 1997 – 2002 – Chairman of Board of Directors, Ghana Broadcasting Corporation
- 2000 – chairman, Technical Advisory Committee on the 2000 National Population and Housing Census

=== International appointments ===
- 1974 – First President of the Federation of African University Sports (FASU)
- 1993 – President of Association of African Universities
- 1993 – Member of the Board of Trustees of Population Council, New York
- 1996 – External Member of the Council of the University of Swaziland
- 1997 – First Chairman of Africa Regional Council of the International Association of University Presidents
- 1998 – Chairman of the Experts Advisory Committee on Population, Environment and Food Security, United Nations Economic Commission for Africa
- 2000 – Vice-chairman of Board of Directors of the African Population Advisory Committee
- 2001 – Member, Board of Trustees of the World Wildlife Fund

== Awards, honours and authorship ==
George Benneh authored over 13 books and booklets and 70 other publications in Geography, Environment, Land Tenure and Land Use, Population, Education and Public Administration. Some of his books include A New Geography of Ghana (1970) and Technology Should Seek Tradition: Studies on Traditional Land Tenure and Small Holder Farming Systems in Ghana (2011). He was a contributor to the Encyclopædia Britannica.

He participated in over 60 International Conferences, Seminars and Workshops including the International Workshop and Rural Poverty Eradication in the 21st Century held in Tokyo in 2000, and the AAU General Conference held in Nairobi in February 2001. George Benneh received the United Nations Global 500 award at the first Earth Summit in Rio de Janeiro, Brazil in 1992 for his contribution to teaching and research in the fields of Population and Environment. He was named the Man of the Year in 1997 by the American Biographical Institute. He was a Member of the New York Academy of Sciences and a Member of New York Academy of Science. He was also a Member of the Academia Europaea (European Academy). He received several state awards from his native Ghana and other states: Grand Officer De Ordre Du Lion, Republic of Senegal, 1981, Companion of River Gambia, Republic of The Gambia, 1981 and member of the Order of the Star of Ghana, 2006.

He was also awarded honorary doctorate degrees (Doctor of Letters – honoris causa) by a number of universities including University of Copenhagen, 1998, Longwood College, Virginia, USA in 1995, University of Tokyo in 1996 and University of Ghana, 2002 and the University for Development Studies, Tamale in 2003 for the role he played in setting up the institution.

The University of Ghana, Legon named a roundabout in honour of George Benneh.

He launched his autobiography, 'My Time, My Nation' in 2017. In the book, he recounts his childhood, school years at Achimota. There are also chapters of his life as an African postgraduate student in Britain and his encounter with racism in the United States. He gives a systemic account of his academic and political careers and how he survived serving under different political regimes and military interventions in the country.

Benneh also donated a multidisciplinary collection of 257 books from his personal library to the Balme Library of the University of Ghana. Some of his books include Fighting For Freedom, Energy And Ghana’s Socio-Economic Development, Technology Should Seek Tradition, Gender: Evolving Roles And Perceptions, Harnessing Research, Science And Technology For Sustainable Development In Ghana, Women And Development In The Third World, European Review, Ghana @ 50 Anniversary Lectures, Philosophy and Human Geography: An Introduction To Contemporary Approaches, Population Dynamics of Kenya.

== Foundation ==
To bridge the research-policy gap and to bring science and technology to the doorstep of every citizen, Benneh initiated the convening of a National Forum on Harnessing Research, Science and Technology for Sustainable National Development in 2004 and was the chair of the planning committee.

He set up a project on ICT for the youth in his hometown in Berekum. Together with his siblings, he donated land at the Benneh Estate for the ICT project saying “education is so important for one’s livelihood” in order to equip the youth with employable skills as a way to solve youth unemployment in the area.

== Personal life ==
He was married to Adelaide Mary Benneh (also known as Nana Adwoa Asiaa Benneh Beyeeman I, a Development Queenmother or Nkosuohemaa of Wirenkyeren Amanfrom and Dwantoa Hemaa of Akyem Abuakwa) with six children, three sons and three daughters, and had 17 grandchildren. He was a Papal Knight of the Catholic Church.

== Death and funeral ==
George Benneh died of natural causes at his home in East Legon, Accra on 11 February 2021, twenty-three days short of his 87th birthday. A requiem mass for Benneh was held at the Holy Spirit Cathedral in Accra before his burial in his hometown of Akrofro, near Berekum in the Bono Region. His funeral was attended by several dignitaries including the Ghanaian president, Nana Akufo-Addo, former Foreign Minister, Hackman Owusu-Agyeman, lawyer and traditional ruler, S. K. B. Asante and the Chairperson of the Electoral Commission of Ghana, Jean Mensa.
