= Javier Laynez Potisek =

Mexican jurist (born 1959)

Javier Laynez
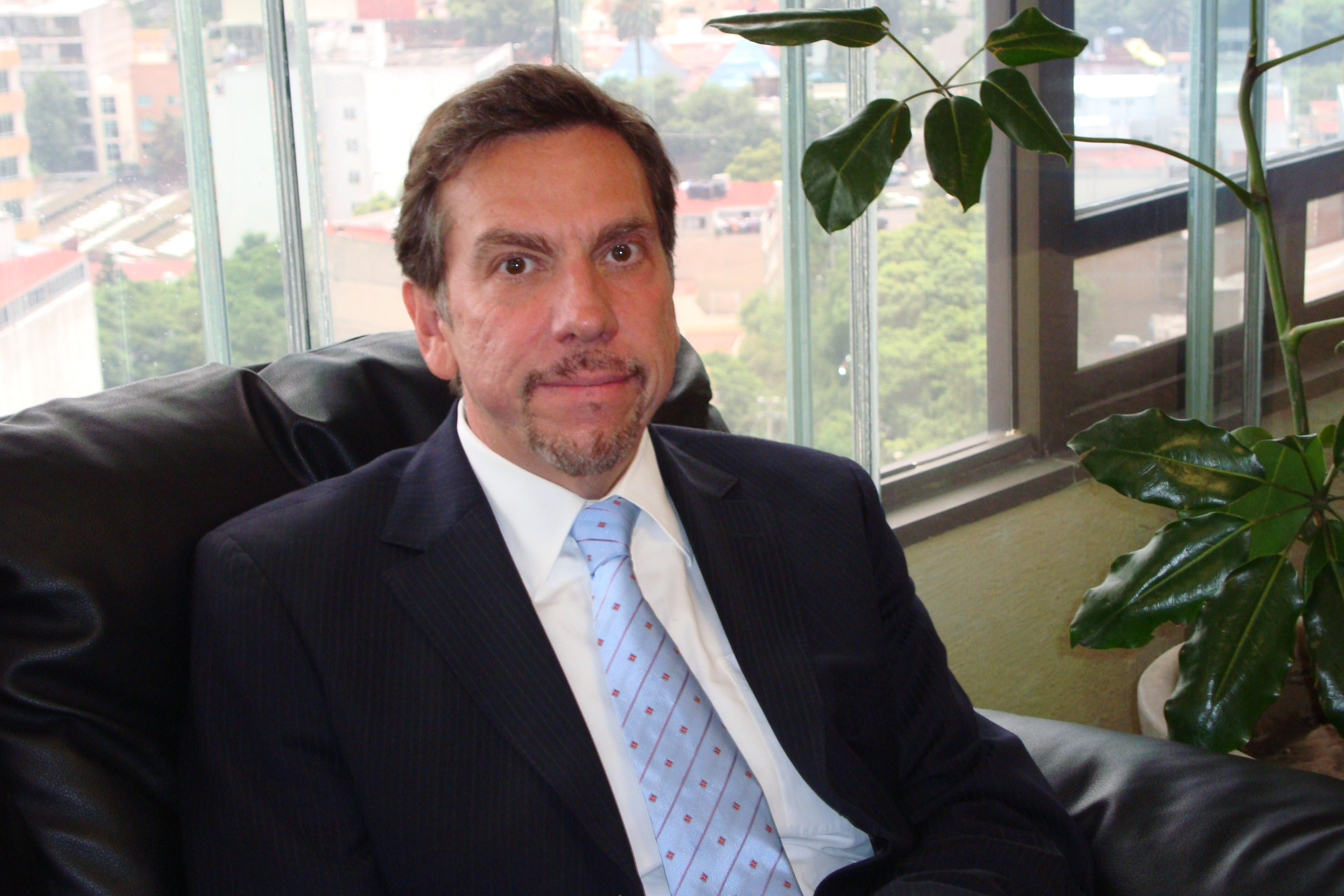
- Javier Laynez

Justice of the Supreme Court of Justice of the Nation
- In office December 10, 2015 – August 31, 2025
- Nominated by: Enrique Peña Nieto
- Preceded by: Juan Silva Meza
- Succeeded by: Seat abolished

Personal details
- Born: Javier Lainez Potisek; June 2, 1959 (age 67) Torreón, Coahuila, Mexico
- Education: Universidad Regiomontana (LLB, MA); Paris Dauphine University (LLM, PhD)
- Profession: Lawyer, Procurator, prosecutor, politician

Javier Laynez Potisek (born June 2, 1959) is a Mexican jurist. In December 10, 2015 he became a member of the Supreme Court of Justice of the Nation (SCJN) of Mexico.

== Education ==
He earned a Law Degree from the Universidad Regiomontana and a Master's in Tax Administration, a Master's in Public Law and a Doctor of Public Law from the Paris-Dauphine University of Paris IX Dauphine.

== Publications ==
- "Do not use protection as an instrument of fiscal planning", May 2009, No. 166, Vol. XXV.
- "Between the energy reform and the fiscal protection", Magazine The World of the Lawyer, No. 112, August 2008.
- "Balance between the Executive and Legislative Powers. Governance: new actors, new challenges ", IBERGOB-MEXICO, Ed. Porrúa, Vol. II, Mexico 2002.
- "The Supreme Court of Justice as Constitutional Court: its impact on the Federal Public Administration". Seminar: Mexican Justice towards the 21st Century. UNAM-Senate of the Republic, Mexico 1997.
- "Constitutional Justice in Political-Electoral Matters". Seminar on Defense and Protection of the Constitution. UNAM 1997.
- "The Legal Department of the Federal Executive". In the publication Strengthening the Rule of Law. FENASEM, Mexico 1996.
- "The Disincorporation of Parastatal Entities: A Return to the Minimum State?" Report of the International Seminar on State Restructuring. INAP 1987.
