= Victor P. Tsilonis =

Greek jurist

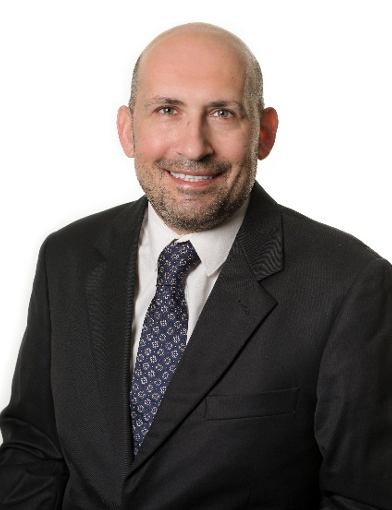
- Dr Victor P. Tsilonis is the Greek Judge Nominee for the 2020 ICC Elections.
- Born: July 16, 1976 (age 50); Thessaloniki, Greece
- Education: University of Nottingham (LL.M.), Aristotle University of Thessaloniki (LL.B., PhD)
- Occupation: Principal Legal Counsel / International Jurist
- Website: www.tsilonis.com

Victor P. Tsilonis, also known as Viktor P. Tsilonis, is the CEO and principal legal counsel of NEWLAW law firm, an international jurist, and was Greece's nominee for the 2020 judicial elections of the International Criminal Court, which is based in The Hague, Netherlands. He is also a member of the International Criminal Court Bar Association (ICCBA), and the Chairman of the ICCBA Professional Standards Advisory Committee, while formerly being ICCBA Vice President for Victims (2021-2022). In 2019-2020 he was also elected as a Vice President for Victims (jointly with Megan Hirst) and simultaneously was the Chairman of the Professional Standards Advisory Committee. Moreover, Tsilonis initially did a four-year term (2018–2022) as an elected ICC Disciplinary Board Alternate Member and has tried four disciplinary cases under this capacity, while now is a Member of the ICC Appeals Disciplinary Board (2023-2027).

== Early life and education ==
Victor P. Tsilonis was born in Thessaloniki, Greece, on 16 July 1976. He initially studied law at Birmingham City in the UK, where he earned a Higher Diploma in Education (Law) after successfully completing the first two years of the LLB program; he obtained his Bachelor of Laws Degree (LL.B.) from the Aristotle University of Thessaloniki, Greece; his Master of Laws Degree (LL.M.) from the University of Nottingham, UK; and his Doctor of Laws (PhD) from the Aristotle University of Thessaloniki, Greece.

== Legal career ==
=== 20-year experience in defending human rights ===
Tsilonis has been a legal counsel in Greece since 2004. He is the founder and principal legal counsel of the niche law firm NewLaw and represents clients in criminal procedures and human rights law cases before the Greek courts and authorities. More than fifteen of the cases in which he has acted as a legal counsel are accessible through “NOMOS”, a Greek legal database, while several others have attracted the media's attention.

=== Leading GDPR, anti-harassment and compliance expert ===
Tsilonis has been CEO & Principal Legal Counsel at Newlaw law firm. His expertise extends to managing complex GDPR, anti-bullying, and compliance programs since 2013, as the head of DataProtect.gr network of experts and while collaborating with leading corporations across various sectors (Theoni, Santowines, Fovera Prostasia, DarkPony, 2happy.gr, etc.). His role encompasses driving strategic compliance initiatives, ensuring legal conformity while fostering ethical workplace environments.

=== ICTY, ICC and academic qualifications ===
His expertise in the field of international criminal justice dates back to 2004, when he spent six months as a Junior Legal Advisor at the Office of the Prosecutor of the International Criminal Tribunal for the former Yugoslavia (Milošević Case). He then completed a PhD thesis on “The Jurisdiction of the International Criminal Court: the Prerequisites for its Exercise” (AUTh, 2016), which was published in Greek in 2017 by Nomiki Bibliothiki and in 2019 in English by Springer (forthcoming 2nd edition, January 2024). He is included in the List of Counsel before the International Criminal Court since April 2016.

=== Teaching law ===
In 2022-2023 he taught the postgraduate course "Criminal Law against Corruption and Financial Crime" at the Hellenic Open University. During the 2018–19 academic year, Tsilonis taught three lectures of the postgraduate course of International Criminal Justice as a visiting lecturer at the Law School of the Democritus University of Thrace. Moreover, he has also taught as a Research Fellow, Lecturer or Academic Director at the International Hellenic University, the Aristotle University of Thessaloniki, the Democritus University of Thrace, the Lord Byron School of Foreign Languages and the Thessaloniki Bar Association, the courses of International Criminal Justice, Criminal Law, Criminology, Prisoners’ Rights, Legal Translation, Legal Terminology, and Legal English Skills (TOLES).

=== International Criminal Court Bar Association ===
Tsilonis is an internationally recognised expert on international criminal law, included in OSCE Consultancy Roster of Legal Experts (Vienna, 2018) and the Roster of Experts of the International Nuremberg Principles Academy (May 2017). He is a member of the International Criminal Court Bar Association since its foundation in 2016, former ICCBA Vice President for Victims (2019-2020, 2021-2022) and currently Chairman of the ICCBA Professional Standards Advisory Committee (2023-2024). In 2019-2020 he was elected in the same position and simultaneously was the Chairman of the Professional Standards Advisory Committee. In November 2022 ICCBA members nominated him for president; although he was not elected he received approximately 28% of the votes cast in favour of his candidacy.

=== International Law Association and European Society of International Law ===
He is also a member of the International Law Association (Committee: International Protection of Consumers) and the European Society of International Law.

=== International Criminal Court ===
In 2019, Tsilonis was elected as an Alternate Member of the Disciplinary Board of the International Criminal Court. Under this capacity, he has sat as a judge in four disciplinary hearings, and co-drafted the decision in the Case: Disciplinary Complaint against Mr Goran Sluiter in December 2019.

In May 2020, Tsilonis was nominated to be Greece's candidate for the 2020 judicial elections of the International Criminal Court. On 30 September 2020 the Report of the Advisory Committee on Nominations of Judges on the work of its seventh session concluded that “Based on both his professional experience and his answers during the interview, the Committee concluded that the candidate is highly qualified for appointment as Judge of the International Criminal Court".
