= Mindia Ugrekhelidze =

Georgian judge

- მინდია უგრეხელიძე (Georgian)
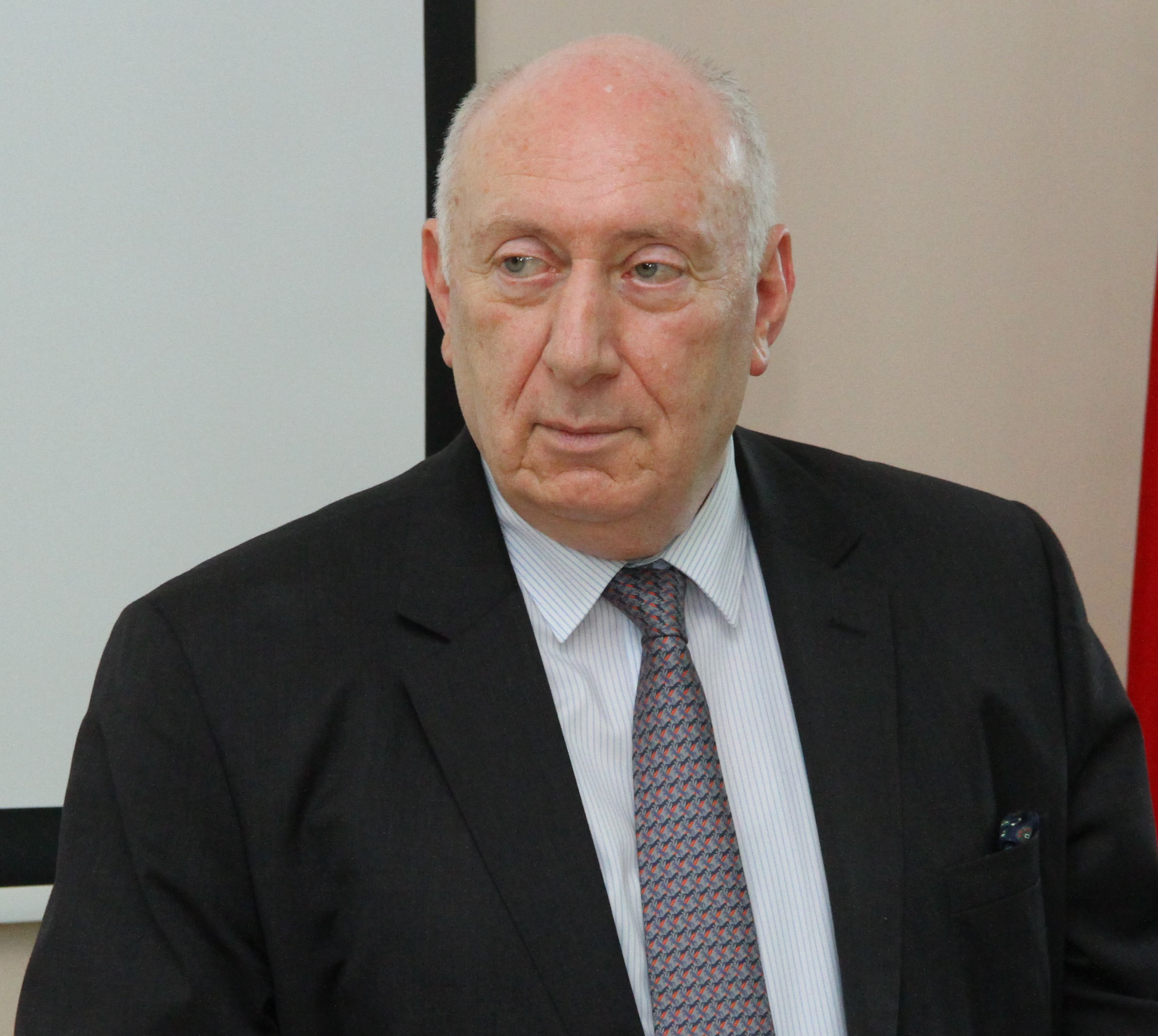

Professor of the St. Andrew the First-Called Georgian University Of the Patriarchate of Georgia

Personal details
- Born: 19 May 1942 (age 84) Kutaisi, Georgia
- Education: Tbilisi State University

Mindia Ugrekhelidze (Georgian: მინდია უგრეხელიძე; born 13 May 1942) is a Georgian judge and legal academic. He served as a chief justice of the Supreme Court of Georgia between 1990 and 1999 and a judge of the European Court of Human Rights between 1999 and 2008. He was a candidate for the December 2014 elections of judges to the International Criminal Court. A holder of the Ph.D. in law (1974) he has authored over 100 publications on various aspects of criminal law and human rights published in Georgian and international academic periodicals.

Mindia Ugrekhelidze is the husband of Eva Gotsiridze, a senior judge in Georgia.
