= Jorge Urbina (diplomat) =

Costa Rican politician (born 1946)

H.E. Jorge Urbina

Permanent Representative to the United Nations for Costa Rica
- Incumbent
- Assumed office October 2006

Personal details
- Born: May 2, 1946 (age 80)

Jorge Urbina (born May 2, 1946) was the Permanent Representative to the United Nations for Costa Rica. He assumed the position in October 2006.

== Education ==
Urbina received a master in law degree from the University of Costa Rica and a doctorate in law from the University of Bordeaux.

== Career ==
From 1982 to 1984, Urbina was the Deputy Permanent Representative to the United Nations for Costa Rica. After this appointment, he was Vice Minister for Foreign Affairs for two years from 1984 to 1986. In 1986, Urbina then moved to the position of the Executive President of the National Institute for Municipal Counselling and Promotion until 1990; he also served as Costa Rica's Minister of Information from 1989 to 1990.

From 1990 to 1993, Urbina was an Associate Researcher at Centro de Investigaciones Económicas y Sociales in Montes de Oca, Costa Rica, and also was a professor at the International Affairs School of Universidad Nacional in Heredia, Costa Rica, for the same period. After that, he served as a permanent consultant at the Programme for Democratic Governance in Central America, United Nations Development from 1993 to 1998.

Until he was appointed Permanent Representative to the United Nations, Mr. Urbina was a Programme Coordinator at the International Centre for Human Development, San José, Costa Rica, from 1998 to 2006.

== Mission work ==
On 11 March 2009, H.E. Jorge Urbina led a four-day United Nations Security Council fact finding mission to Haiti to assess the impact of aide provided to the country through UN Stabilization Mission in Haiti (MINUSTAH) and the UN Development Programme (UNDP). In his later report to the UN, he stated, "It was evident to the mission that the current levels of extreme poverty, in which 80 per cent of the people live on under two dollars a day and 50 per cent on under one dollar are incompatible with the goal to establish stability in the short term."

== See also ==
- List of current permanent representatives to the United Nations
