= Howard Morrison (barrister) =

British judge (born 1949)

His Honour Sir Howard Morrison KCMG, CBE, KC
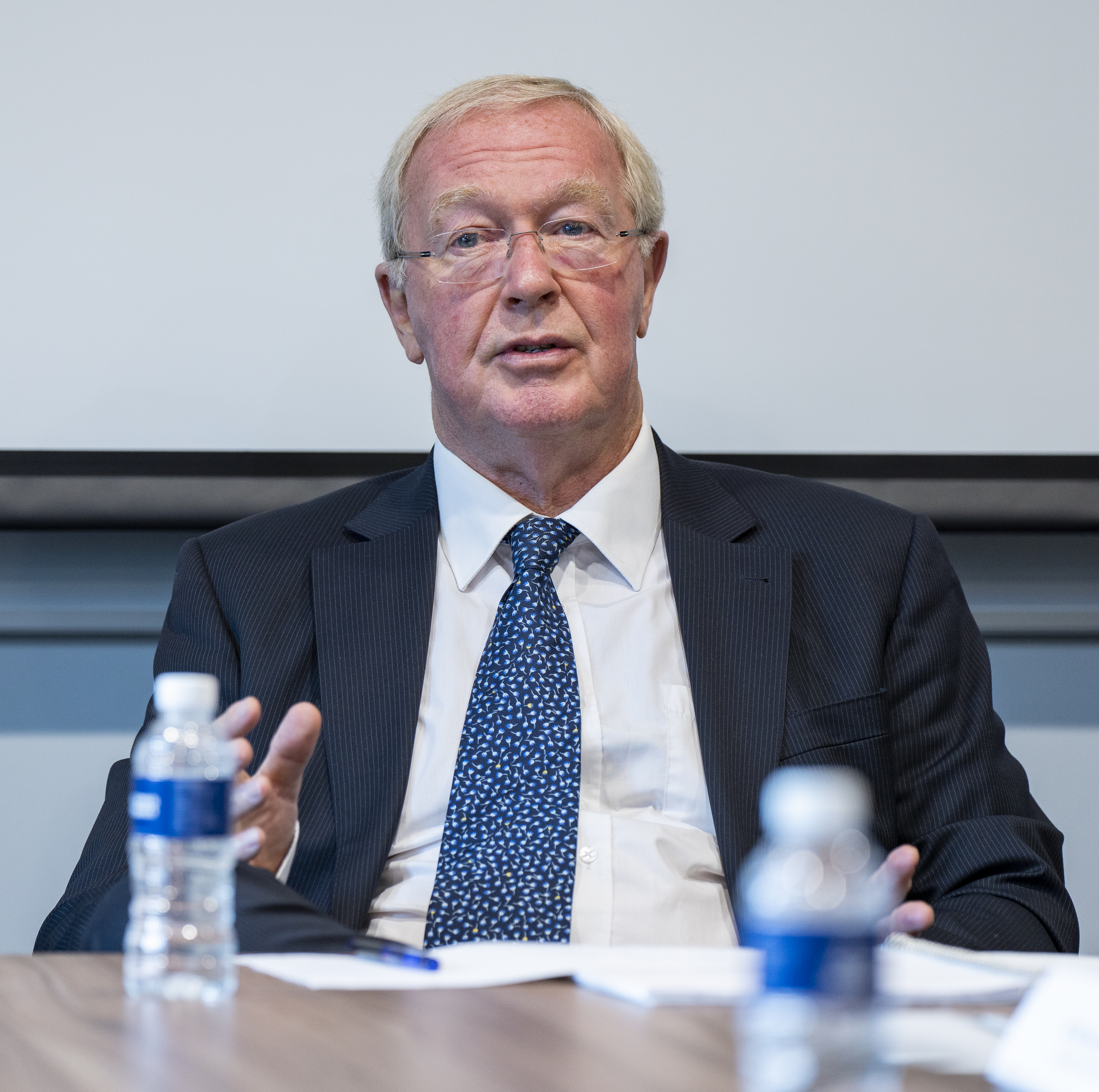

Judge of the International Criminal Court
- In office 11 March 2012 – 10 March 2021
- Nominated by: United Kingdom
- Appointed by: Assembly of States Parties

Judge of the International Criminal Tribunal for the former Yugoslavia
- In office 31 August 2009 – 31 March 2016

Judge of the Special Tribunal for Lebanon
- In office 9 March 2009 – 14 July 2009

Personal details
- Born: Howard Andrew Clive Morrison; 20 July 1949 (age 77) Britain
- Education: University of London; Gray's Inn
- Occupation: Lawyer, judge

Sir Howard Andrew Clive Morrison KCMG, CBE, KC (born 20 July 1949), is a British lawyer who was a judge of the International Criminal Court from 2012 to 2021 and the International Criminal Tribunal for the former Yugoslavia from 2009 to 2016. He is currently a UK advisor on war crimes to the Ukrainian Prosecutor General.

== Legal career ==
Morrison was called to the Bar at Gray's Inn in 1977, following post-graduate study at the Inns of Court School of Law, where he was subsequently appointed a Bencher in 2008. From 1977 to 1985, he practised on the Midland and Oxford Circuit, including working in courts martial in the UK and Germany. In 1985, he was appointed Resident Magistrate and then Chief Magistrate of Fiji, and Senior Magistrate for Tuvalu. In 1988, he was appointed Attorney General of Anguilla with specific responsibility for the speedy enactment of new anti-drugs legislation, and awarded an OBE for leadership and court management services to the Fijian judiciary during complex military coups. He was called to the bars of Fiji (in 1988) and the Eastern Caribbean Supreme Court (in 1990). He returned to the United Kingdom in 1989, where he continued to work on the Midland Circuit, being appointed Assistant Recorder in 1993 and Recorder in 1997 with authority to try criminal, civil and family law cases. He served as a member of the Bar Council's Race Relations and Equal Opportunities Committees being a strong advocate for the appointment of more female and ethnic minority candidates for judicial posts.

In 1998, he began working in defence at the International Criminal Tribunal for Rwanda (ICTR) in Arusha, Tanzania, and the International Criminal Tribunal for the former Yugoslavia (ICTY) in The Hague, being appointed Queen's Counsel in 2001. In 2004, he ceased working at the war crimes tribunals to become a full-time Circuit Judge with authority to try all classes of criminal cases, and in 2008 became Senior Judge of the Sovereign Base Areas of Cyprus. He was appointed CBE in 2007 for services to international law

Morrison was appointed a judge of the Special Tribunal for Lebanon in 2009, but resigned shortly afterwards on his appointment as a Judge of the International Criminal Tribunal for the former Yugoslavia (ICTY), succeeding Lord Bonomy. He was trial judge in the case of Radovan Karadžić amongst others until 2016.

Morrison was elected as one of the six judges for the International Criminal Court on 16 December 2011 at the International Criminal Court judges election during the 10th session of the Assembly of States Parties to the Rome Statute of the International Criminal Court. His ICC mandate expired on 31 March 2021 after service as President of the Appeals Division.

On 26 October 2015, Morrison was knighted by Queen Elizabeth II as a Knight Commander of the Order of St Michael and St George (KCMG), for services to international justice and the rule of law.

== Other appointments ==
Morrison was a Holding Redlich Distinguished Visiting Fellow at Monash University Faculty of Law in 2007. He also lectures on international humanitarian law throughout Europe, Africa, the Middle East, USA and Australia. He was a member of the Race Relations Committee of the Bar Council from 1996 to 2002 and of its Equal Opportunities Committee from 2002 to 2003. He is a member of the International Bar Association, the Commonwealth Judges and Magistrates Association, the British Institute of International and Comparative Law, and of the advisory board for the Journal of International Criminal Law. He was appointed a Fellow of the Royal Geographical Society (FRGS) in 1991, appointed Fellow of the Royal Society of Arts [FRSA] 2018. Appointed Hon Professor of Law, Leicester University 2012 and Senior Fellow, Lauterpacht Centre for International Law, Cambridge University 2013. Awarded LL.D [Doctor of Laws] by Leicester University July 2014. Appointed Visiting Professor of law at Northumbria University 2017. Appointed to the advisory board of Durham University Law School 2017. He has been a visiting lecturer at 22 universities worldwide. Former TAVR infantry subaltern.
