= Geoffrey Henderson =

Trinidad and Tobago judge

Geoffrey A. Henderson

Judge of the International Criminal Court
- In office 23 November 2013 – 10 March 2021
- Nominated by: Trinidad and Tobago
- Appointed by: Assembly of States Parties
- Preceded by: Anthony Carmona

Personal details
- Born: 4 February 1961 (age 64)

Geoffrey A. Henderson (born 4 February 1961) is a jurist from Trinidad and Tobago who served as a judge of the International Criminal Court from 2013 to 2021.
