= Olga Venecia Herrera Carbuccia =

Dominican jurist (born 1956)

Judge of the International Criminal Court
- In office 11 March 2012 – 10 March 2021
- Nominated by: Dominican Republic
- Appointed by: Assembly of States Parties

Personal details
- Born: Olga Venecia Herrera Carbuccia
- Relations: Manuel Herrera Carbuccia (brother)
- Parents: Abelardo Herrera Peña (father); Mercedes Luisa Carbuccia de Herrera (mother)

Olga Venecia Herrera Carbuccia (born 1956) is a Dominican jurist who served as a judge of the International Criminal Court (ICC) from 2012 to 2021.

== Early life and education ==
Herrera comes from a family of lawyers, medics, musicians and poets. She is daughter of Mercedes Luisa Carbuccia Montalvo, one of the first women to graduate as Doctor of Medicine in San Pedro de Macorís, and Abelardo Herrera Peña, justice of the Supreme Court of the Dominican Republic.

Herrera has two sisters and a brother: Dora Rosanna Herrera Carbuccia, especialized en Pediatrics; Vanesa Margarita Herrera Carbuccia, a lawyer specialized in municipal issues; and Manuel Herrera Carbuccia, a justice of the Supreme Court of the Dominican Republic.

Herrera finished her studies with a doctor's degree from the Universidad Autónoma de Santo Domingo in 1980.

== Career ==
=== Early career ===
Following her graduation, Herrera was the fiscal of a peace court from 1981 to 1984 and as the assistant attorney to the National District Prosecutor in Santo Domingo. From 1986 to 1991, she was a judge at a Criminal Chamber of the Court of First Instance in Santo Domingo, rising to the Criminal Chamber of the Court of Appeals where she worked until 2003, in the end as the Presiding Judge of the First Criminal Chamber of the Court of Appeals in Santo Domingo. From 2003 on, she served as Judge President of the Criminal Chamber of the Court of Appeals for the Judicial Department in Santo Domingo, Dominican Republic.

=== International Criminal Court, 2012–2021 ===
On 15 December 2011, Herrera was elected as a judge of the International Criminal Court. She won the office in the twelfth ballot in the Assembly of States Parties with 77 votes and 73 votes needed. She took office on 11 March 2012.

At the ICC, Herrera sat in the Pre-Trial Division. In this capacity, she was part of the panel which authorized a full-scale investigation into allegations of mass persecution and crimes against humanity that forced at least 600,000 Rohingya Muslims to flee Myanmar into neighbouring Bangladesh. In 2021, she was a judge in the proceedings that resulted in Congolese militia leader Bosco Ntaganda being sentenced to pay child soldiers and other victims a total of $30 million compensation, the Court's highest ever reparation order.

== See also ==
- List of first women lawyers and judges in North America
