= List of people indicted in the International Criminal Court =

The International Criminal Court (ICC) has issued indictments and arrest warrants for individuals on any counts of genocide, crimes against humanity, war crimes, aggression, or contempt of court pursuant to the Rome Statute. An individual is indicted when a Pre-Trial Chamber issues either an arrest warrant or a summons after it finds that "there are reasonable grounds to believe that the person has committed a crime within the jurisdiction of the Court". An arrest warrant is issued where it appears necessary "to ensure the person's appearance at trial, to ensure that the person does not obstruct or endanger the investigation or the court proceedings, or, where applicable, to prevent the person from continuing with the commission of that crime or a related crime which is within the jurisdiction of the Court and which arises out of the same circumstances". The Pre-Trial Chamber issues a summons if it is satisfied that a summons is sufficient to ensure the person's appearance.

== Overview ==
The ICC has publicly indicted 76 people. Proceedings against 39 are ongoing: 33 are at large as fugitives, two cases are in the pre-trial stage, one person is on trial, and three cases are in the appeals stage. Proceedings against 37 have been completed: three are serving sentences, seven have finished sentences, four have been acquitted, eight have had the charges against them dismissed, five have had the charges against them withdrawn, and 10 have died before the conclusion of the proceedings against them.

The list below details the counts against each individual indicted in the Court and his or her current status. Respectively, the column titled G lists the number of counts (if any) of the crime of genocide with which an individual has been charged; H list the number of counts of crimes against humanity; W the number of counts of war crimes; A the number of counts of the crime of aggression; and C lists the number of counts of contempt of the court and other offenses against the administration of justice. Note that these are the counts with which an individual was indicted, not convicted. The column titled Ind. provides a link to an indictment, arrest warrant, summons, or other document listing the final charges against the individual before the beginning of the confirmation of charges hearing.

Shown in the table below under the column titled S are the Court's investigations into 19 situations: (1) the Democratic Republic of the Congo; (2) Uganda; (3) Darfur, Sudan; (4) the Central African Republic I; (5) Kenya; (6) Libya; (7) Côte d'Ivoire; (8) Mali; (9) the Central African Republic II; (10) Georgia; (11) Burundi; (12) Bangladesh/Myanmar; (13) Afghanistan I; (14) Palestine; (15) the Philippines; (16) Venezuela I; (17) Ukraine; (18) Lithuania/Belarus; and (19) Afghanistan II.

Name	S	Indicted	G	H	W	A	C	Detained	Current status	Ind.
Joseph Kony	2	8 July 2005	—	21	18	—	—		Fugitive	
Raska Lukwiya	2	8 July 2005	—	1	3	—	—		Died on 12 August 2006; proceedings terminated on 11 July 2007	
Okot Odhiambo	2	8 July 2005	—	3	7	—	—		Died on 27 October 2013; proceedings terminated on 10 September 2015	
Dominic Ongwen	2	8 July 2005	—	34	36	—	—	16 January 2015	Serving sentence of 25 years' imprisonment in Norway	
Vincent Otti	2	8 July 2005	—	11	21	—	—		Died on 2 October 2007; proceedings terminated 17 November 2023	
Thomas Lubanga Dyilo	1	10 February 2006	—	—	3	—	—	17 March 2006	Completed sentence of 14 years' imprisonment on 15 March 2020	
Bosco Ntaganda	1	22 August 2006	—	5	13	—	—	22 March 2013	Serving sentence of 30 years' imprisonment in Belgium	
Ahmed Haroun	3	27 April 2007	—	20	22	—	—		Fugitive	
Ali Abd-al-Rahman	3	27 April 2007	—	15	16	—	—	9 June 2020	Appeal of sentence of 20 years' imprisonment	
Germain Katanga (Note: Germain Katanga's sentence of 12 years' imprisonment was reduced to 8 years and 4 months' imprisonment.)	1	2 July 2007	—	4	9	—	—	17 October 2007	Completed commuted sentence on 18 January 2016	
Mathieu Ngudjolo Chui	1	6 July 2007	—	4	9	—	—	6 February 2008	Acquitted on 7 April 2015 (released on 21 December 2012)	
Jean-Pierre Bemba (Note: The charges against Jean-Pierre Bemba also include those from a case initiated on 20 November 2013; in that case he has completed his sentence of one year's imprisonment and a €300,000 fine.)	4	23 May 2008	—	3	5	—	43	3 July 2008	Acquitted on 8 June 2018 (released on 12 June 2018)	
Omar al-Bashir (Note: The charges against Omar al-Bashir also included those from an additional arrest warrant issued on 12 July 2010.)	3	4 March 2009	3	5	2	—	—		Fugitive	
Bahr Abu Garda	3	7 May 2009	—	—	3	—	—	Summoned	Charges dismissed on 8 February 2010	
Abdallah Banda	3	27 August 2009	—	—	3	—	—	Summoned	Charges withdrawn on 23 July 2026	
Saleh Jerbo	3	27 August 2009	—	—	3	—	—	Summoned	Died on 19 April 2013; proceedings terminated on 4 October 2013	
Callixte Mbarushimana	1	28 September 2010	—	5	8	—	—	25 January 2011	Charges dismissed on 16 December 2011 (released on 23 December 2011)	
Mohammed Ali	5	8 March 2011	—	5	—	—	—	Summoned	Charges dismissed on 23 January 2012	
Uhuru Kenyatta	5	8 March 2011	—	5	—	—	—	Summoned	Charges withdrawn on 13 March 2015	
Henry Kosgey	5	8 March 2011	—	3	—	—	—	Summoned	Charges dismissed on 23 January 2012	
Francis Muthaura	5	8 March 2011	—	5	—	—	—	Summoned	Charges withdrawn on 18 March 2013	
William Ruto	5	8 March 2011	—	3	—	—	—	Summoned	Charges dismissed on 5 April 2015	
Joshua Sang	5	8 March 2011	—	3	—	—	—	Summoned	Charges dismissed on 5 April 2015	
Muammar Gaddafi	6	27 June 2011	—	2	—	—	—		Died on 20 October 2011; proceedings terminated on 22 November 2011	
Saif al-Islam Gaddafi	6	27 June 2011	—	2	—	—	—		Fugitive; reported to have died on 3 February 2026	
Abdullah Senussi	6	27 June 2011	—	2	—	—	—		Charges dismissed on 11 October 2013	
Laurent Gbagbo	7	23 November 2011	—	4	—	—	—	30 November 2011	Acquitted on 31 March 2021 (released on 11 February 2019)	
Charles Blé Goudé	7	21 December 2011	—	4	—	—	—	23 March 2014	Acquitted on 31 March 2021 (released on 11 February 2019)	
Simone Gbagbo	7	29 February 2012	—	4	—	—	—		Charges withdrawn on 19 July 2021	
Abdel Rahim Hussein	3	1 March 2012	—	7	6	—	—		Fugitive	
Sylvestre Mudacumura	1	13 July 2012	—	—	9	—	—		Died on 17 September 2019; proceedings terminated on 12 November 2026	
Tohami Khaled	6	18 April 2013	—	4	3	—	—		Died on 12 February 2021; proceedings terminated on 7 September 2022	
Walter Barasa	5	2 August 2013	—	—	—	—	3		Fugitive	
Narcisse Arido	4	20 November 2013	—	—	—	—	43	18 March 2014	Completed sentence of 11 months' imprisonment on 2 July 2018	
Fidèle Babala	4	20 November 2013	—	—	—	—	42	25 November 2013	Completed sentence of 6 months' imprisonment on 8 March 2018 (released on 23 October 2014)	
Aimé Kilolo	4	20 November 2013	—	—	—	—	43	25 November 2013	Completed sentence of 11 months' and €30,000 fine on 17 September 2018 (released on 23 October 2014)	
Jean-Jacques Mangenda	4	20 November 2013	—	—	—	—	43	4 December 2013	Completed sentence of 11 months' on 17 September 2018 (released on 31 October 2014)	
Philip Bett	5	10 March 2015	—	—	—	—	4		Fugitive	
Paul Gicheru	5	10 March 2015	—	—	—	—	8	3 November 2020	Died on 27 September 2022; proceedings terminated on 14 October 2022 (released on 1 February 2021)	
Ahmad al-Mahdi (Note: Ahmad al-Mahdi's sentence of 9 years' imprisonment was reduced to 7 years' imprisonment.)	8	18 September 2015	—	—	1	—	—	26 September 2015	Completed commuted sentence on 20 September 2022	
Iyad Ag Ghaly	8	18 July 2017	—	6	4	—	—		Fugitive	
Mahmoud al-Werfalli (Note: The charges against Mahmoud al-Werfalli also included those from an additional arrest warrant issued on 4 July 2018.)	6	15 August 2017	—	—	2	—	—		Died on 24 March 2021; proceedings terminated on 15 June 2022	
Al-Hassan Ag Abdoul Aziz	8	27 March 2018	—	6	7	—	—	31 March 2018	Serving sentence of 9 years' imprisonment	
Alfred Yekatom	9	11 November 2018	—	11	10	—	—	17 November 2018	Appeal of sentence of 15 years' imprisonment	
Edmond Beina	9	7 December 2018	—	6	6	—	—		Charges dismissed on 12 September 2025	
Patrice-Edouard Ngaïssona	9	7 December 2018	—	54	57	—	—	23 January 2019	Appeal of sentence of 12 years' imprisonment	
Maxime Mokom	9	10 December 2018	—	9	13	—	—	14 March 2022	Charges withdrawn on 17 October 2023 (released on 17 October 2023)	
Noureddine Adam	9	7 January 2019	—	5	1	—	—		Fugitive	
Mahamat Said Abdel Kani	9	7 January 2019	—	8	6	—	—	24 January 2021	Convicted on 23 September 2026; awaiting sentencing	
Saif Suleiman Sneidel	6	10 November 2020	—	—	3	—	—		Fugitive	
Hamlet Guchmazov	10	24 June 2022	—	—	5	—	—		Fugitive	
Mikhail Mindzaev	10	24 June 2022	—	—	5	—	—		Fugitive	
David Sanakoev	10	24 June 2022	—	—	2	—	—		Fugitive	
Maria Lvova-Belova	17	17 March 2023	—	—	2	—	—		Fugitive	—
Vladimir Putin	17	17 March 2023	—	—	2	—	—		Fugitive	—
Makhlouf Douma	6	6 April 2023	—	—	4	—	—		Fugitive	
Abdulrahem Al Kani	6	6 April 2023	—	—	4	—	—		Fugitive	
Nasser Al Lahsa	6	6 April 2023	—	—	4	—	—		Fugitive	
Mohamed Salheen	6	6 April 2023	—	—	6	—	—		Fugitive	
Abdelbari Al Shaqaqi	6	18 July 2023	—	—	4	—	—		Fugitive	
Fathi Al Zinkal	6	18 July 2023	—	—	6	—	—		Fugitive	
Sergei Kobylash	17	5 March 2024	—	1	2	—	—		Fugitive	—
Viktor Sokolov	17	5 March 2024	—	1	2	—	—		Fugitive	—
Valery Gerasimov	17	24 June 2024	—	1	2	—	—		Fugitive	—
Sergei Shoigu	17	24 June 2024	—	1	2	—	—		Fugitive	—
Mohammed Deif	14	21 November 2024	—	4	6	—	—		Died on 13 July 2024; proceedings terminated on 26 February 2025	—
Yoav Gallant	14	21 November 2024	—	3	2	—	—		Fugitive	—
Benjamin Netanyahu	14	21 November 2024	—	3	2	—	—		Fugitive	—
Osama Njeem	6	18 January 2025	—	6	6	—	—		Fugitive	
Rodrigo Duterte	15	7 March 2025	—	3	—	—	—	12 March 2025	Case in pre-trial stage	
Hibatullah Akhundzada	19	8 July 2025	—	1	—	—	—		Fugitive	
Abdul Hakim Haqqani	19	8 July 2025	—	1	—	—	—		Fugitive	
Khaled El Hishri	6	10 July 2025	—	11	6	—	—	1 December 2025	Case in pre-trial stage	
Habibullah Agha	19	9 September 2025	—	1	—	—	—		Fugitive	
Neda Mohammad Nadeem	19	9 September 2025	—	1	—	—	—		Fugitive	
Ronald dela Rosa	15	6 November 2025	—	1	—	—	—		Fugitive	

== List of indictees ==
=== Bahr Abu Garda ===
Bahr Abu Garda was indicted on 7 May 2009 on three counts of war crimes with regard to the situation in Darfur, Sudan. Abu Garda was alleged to have been a commander of a splinter group of the Justice and Equality Movement (JEM), a rebel group that fought in the Darfur conflict against the Sudanese government. He was accused of leading JEM forces under his command (in conjunction with other rebel forces) in a raid on the Haskanita base of the African Union Mission in Sudan (AMIS) on 29 September 2007, in which 12 AMIS peacekeepers were killed and eight were seriously injured; the base was also extensively damaged. Abu Garda was accused of being criminally responsible for murder, pillaging, and "intentionally directing attacks against personnel, installations, materials, units and vehicles involved in a peacekeeping mission". Abu Garda was summoned to appear before the Court on 18 May 2009 and the confirmation of charges hearing was held from 19 October 2009 to 30 October 2009. On 8 February 2010 Pre-Trial Chamber I ruled that the charges against him would not be confirmed. On 23 April 2010 Pre-Trial Chamber I rejected the Prosecutor's application to appeal its decision, thus ending the proceedings in the case.

=== Mohammed Hussein Ali ===
Mohammed Ali was indicted on 8 March 2011 on five counts of crimes against humanity with regard to the situation in the Republic of Kenya. Ali, who at the time was the Commissioner of the Kenya Police, was alleged to have conspired with Francis Muthaura, an adviser of Kenyan President Mwai Kibaki, to order the police forces that he commanded not to intervene in stopping violence perpetrated by Mungiki forces loyal to President Kibaki during post-election violence from 27 December 2007 to 29 February 2008. Ali was alleged to be criminally responsible for murders, deportations, rapes and other forms of sexual violence, persecutions, and other inhumane acts perpetrated by Mungiki against civilians who were perceived to be loyal to the Orange Democratic Movement (the political party of President Kibaki's rival) in the towns of Kibera, Kisumu, Naivasha, and Nakuru. Ali was summoned to appear before the Court on 8 April 2011 and the confirmation of charges hearing was held from 21 September 2011 to 5 October 2011, in conjunction with the cases against Muthaura and Uhuru Kenyatta. On 23 January 2012, Pre-Trial Chamber II decided not to confirm the charges against Ali, thus ending the proceedings against him.

=== Abdallah Banda ===
Abdallah Banda was indicted on 27 August 2009 on three counts of war crimes with regard to the situation in Darfur, Sudan. Banda is alleged to have been a commander of a splinter group of the Justice and Equality Movement (JEM), a rebel group that fought in the Darfur conflict against the Sudanese government. He is accused of leading JEM forces under his command (in conjunction with other rebel forces) in a raid on the Haskanita base of the African Union Mission in Sudan (AMIS) on 29 September 2007, in which 12 AMIS peacekeepers were killed and eight were seriously injured; the base was also extensively damaged. Banda is accused of ordering murders, pillaging, and "intentionally directing attacks against personnel, installations, materials, units and vehicles involved in a peacekeeping mission". Banda was summoned to appear before the Court on 17 June 2010 and the confirmation of charges hearing was held on 8 December 2010, in conjunction with the case against Saleh Jerbo. On 7 March 2011 Pre-Trial Chamber I confirmed all the charges against him. On 11 September 2014, Trial Chamber IV replaced the summons to appear with an arrest warrant and suspended the case until Banda appears in court.

=== Omar al-Bashir ===
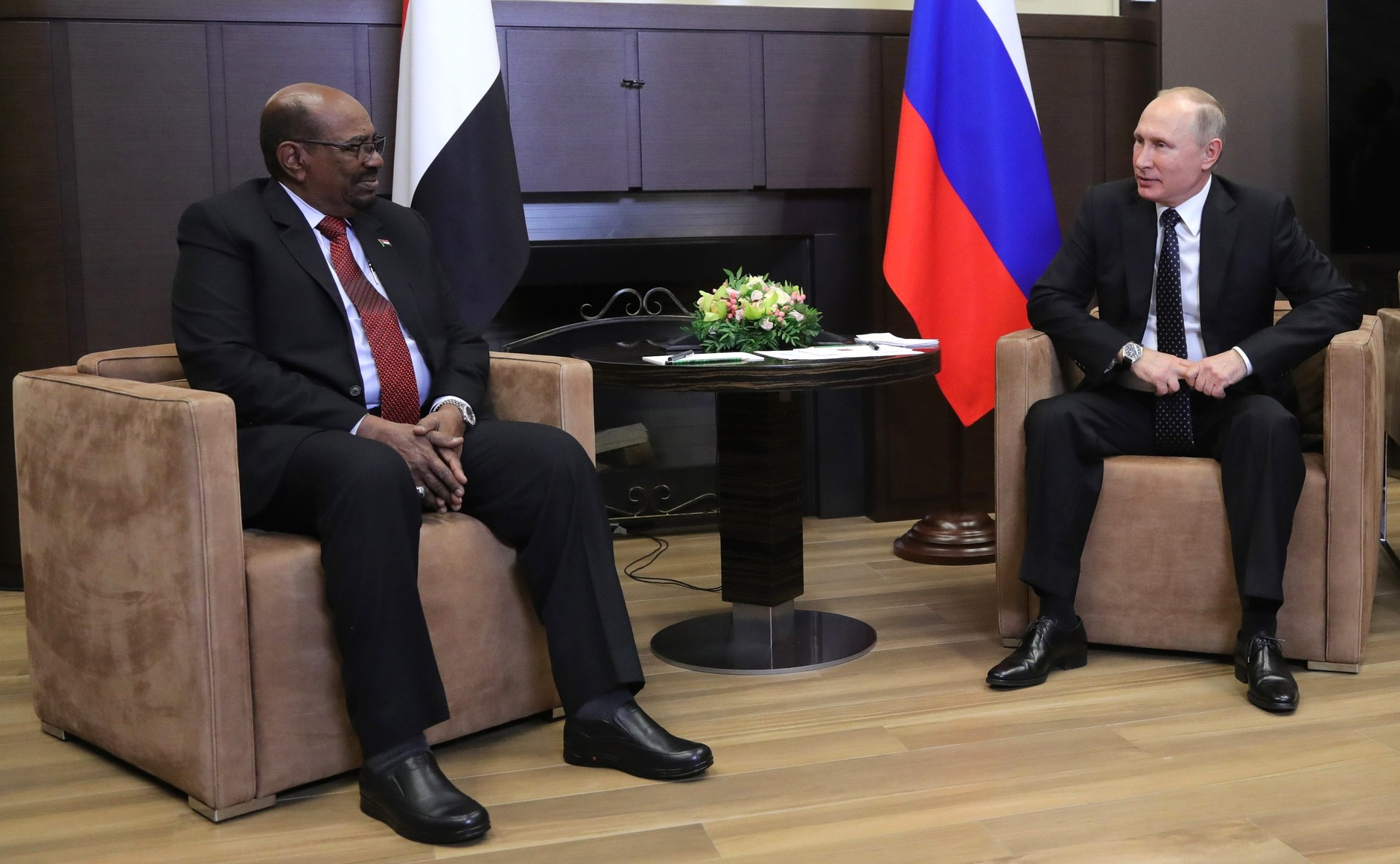
Sudanese President Omar al-Bashir and Russian President Vladimir Putin in November 2017

Omar al-Bashir was indicted on 4 March 2009 on five counts of crimes against humanity and two counts of war crimes with regard to the situation in Darfur, Sudan. On 12 July 2010 he was additionally charged with three counts of genocide. During the Darfur conflict (specifically from April 2003 to 14 July 2008), al-Bashir, from his position as President of Sudan, is accused of implementing a government policy that used the state apparatus (the military, police, security, and Janjaweed forces) to attack Fur, Masalit, and Zaghawa populations that were perceived to be sympathetic to rebel groups. Al-Bashir is accused of ordering the rape, murder, extermination, forcible transfer, and torture of civilians, as well as the pillaging of numerous villages and camps. Additionally, he is accused of intending to partially destroy the Fur, Masalit, and Zaghawa ethnic groups by killings, "causing serious bodily or mental harm", and "deliberately inflicting conditions of life calculated to bring about physical destruction" of the ethnic groups. The Court has issued two arrest warrants for al-Bashir but he is currently living openly in Sudan, where he served as President until 11 April 2019. Sudanese state policy has been not to cooperate with the Court. Since the warrants have been issued, al-Bashir has traveled to several other countries and has not been arrested. Among the countries he traveled to include Chad, Djibouti, Kenya, Malawi, and South Africa which are states parties to the Rome Statute, and were therefore obligated to arrest him. On 26 March 2013, Pre-Trial Chamber II made a finding that Chad had failed to cooperate with the Court and therefore referred the non-compliance to the Security Council. On 5 September 2013, however, Pre-Trial Chamber II found that a similar visit to Nigeria did not constitute non-compliance, but it requested Nigeria "to immediately arrest Omar Al Bashir and surrender him to the Court should a similar situation arise in the future".

=== Jean-Pierre Bemba ===
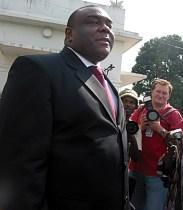
Jean-Pierre Bemba in December 2006

Jean-Pierre Bemba was indicted on 23 May 2008 on two counts of crimes against humanity and four counts of war crimes with regard to the situation in the Central African Republic (CAR). On 10 June 2008, the arrest warrant was amended and the charges changed to three counts of crimes against humanity and five counts of war crimes. Bemba is alleged to have led the Movement for the Liberation of the Congo (MLC), a Congolese rebel group, into the CAR after Central African President Ange-Félix Patassé sought Bemba's assistance in suppressing a rebellion led by François Bozizé. Bemba was accused of being criminally responsible for acts of rape, torture, "outrages upon personal dignity", murder, and pillage that occurred in the towns and cities of Bangui, Bossangoa, Bossembélé, Damara, and Mongoumba from 25 October 2002 to 15 March 2003. Bemba was arrested in Belgium on 24 May 2008, transferred to the Court's custody on 3 July 2008, and first brought before the Court the next day. The final charges filed by the Prosecutor were three counts of crimes against humanity and five counts of war crimes. The confirmation of charges hearing was held from 12 to 15 January 2009, and on 15 June 2009 Pre-Trial Chamber II partially confirmed the charges against Bemba, finding that he would stand trial for two counts of crimes against humanity and three counts of war crimes. Specifically, Pre-Trial Chamber II declined to confirm the charges of torture or outrages upon personal dignity. The trial against Bemba began on 22 November 2010. On 21 March 2016, Trial Chamber III delivered its judgment in which it found Bemba guilty of all five counts. The Trial Chamber sentenced Bemba to 18 years' imprisonment on 21 June 2016.

On 28 September 2016, Bemba served the ICC appeals chamber with an appeal against his 18-year conviction citing numerous procedural and legal errors in the judgment, and alleging a mistrial. This conviction was overturned on 8 June 2018 by Judge Christine Van den Wyngaert. She said he cannot be held responsible for the actions of his men, and that the lower court "ignored significant testimonial evidence that Bemba's ability to investigate and punish crimes in the CAR was limited".

=== Rodrigo Duterte ===
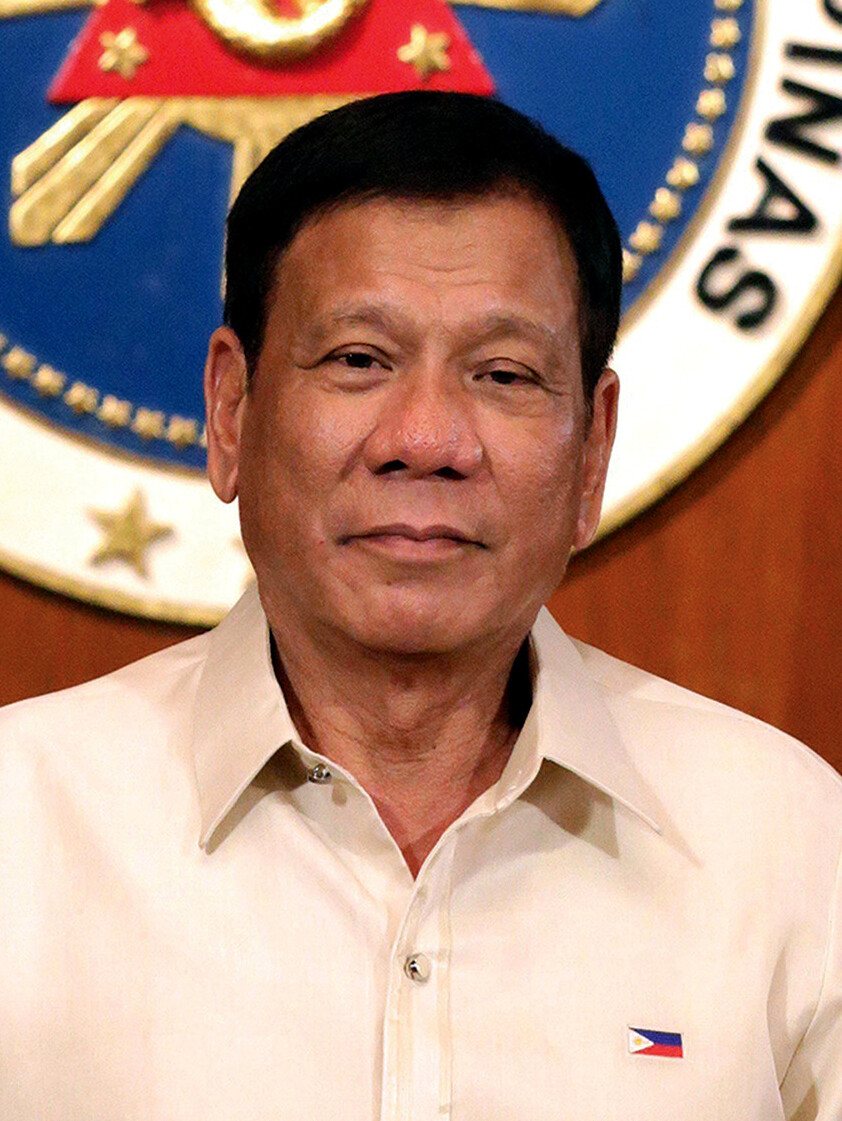
Rodrigo Duterte

Rodrigo Duterte was indicted on 7 March 2025 with 43 counts of crimes against humanity with regard to the situation in the Philippines. Duterte was known for initiating a deadly war on drugs in the Philippines during his tenure as president. This involves the allegations of the Davao Death Squad killing of drug dealers and thieves in Davao City and the usage of law enforcement to kill suspected criminals nationwide. Duterte was arrested at Ninoy Aquino International Airport in Metro Manila on 11 March 2025 upon his arrival from Hong Kong, and extradited to The Hague later that day.

Duterte's arrest drew mixed reactions from Filipinos. Diehard supporters expressed anger and staged protests. Meanwhile, many other Filipinos, including human rights groups, Filipino bishops, and victims' families expressed relief and celebrated the indictment and arrest, hopeful that the ICC would administer long-awaited justice.

=== Charles Blé Goudé ===
Charles Blé Goudé was indicted on 21 December 2011 with four counts of crimes against humanity with regard to the situation in the Republic of Côte d'Ivoire. As the leader of the Congrès Panafricain des Jeunes et des Patriotes, the youth organization that supported Ivorian President Laurent Gbagbo, Blé Goudé is alleged to have been "an indirect co-perpetrator" in Gbagbo's organized plan of systematic attacks against civilians in and around Abidjan, including in the vicinity of the Golf Hotel, during post-election violence that began on 28 November 2010. Fighters under the command of Gbagbo are alleged to have murdered, raped, persecuted, and inhumanly treated civilians who were perceived to be supporters of Alassane Ouattara, Gbagbo's opponent in the 2010 presidential election. Blé Goudé was arrested on 17 January 2013 in Ghana, and extradited to Côte d'Ivoire the next day. On 22 March 2014, the Ivorian government transferred Blé Goudé to the Court's custody. He arrived at the Court's detention center in The Hague on 23 March. The confirmation of charges hearing was held from 29 September to 2 October 2014, and on 11 December 2014, the Pre-Trial Chamber confirmed all the charges against Blé Goudé, thereby committing him to trial. On 11 March 2015, the Trial Chamber joined the cases against Blé Goudé and Laurent Gbagbo. The trial in the case began on 28 January 2016.

Gbagbo and Goudé were acquitted on 15 January 2019 and their release was ordered.

=== Muammar Gaddafi ===
Muammar Gaddafi was indicted on 27 June 2011 on two counts of crimes against humanity with regard to the situation in Libya. As the "Brotherly Leader and Guide of the Revolution" (the de facto head of state) and Commander of the Armed Forces of Libya he allegedly planned, in conjunction with his inner circle of advisers, a policy of violent oppression of popular uprisings in the early weeks of the Libyan civil war. He allegedly formulated a plan in response to the 2011 Tunisian and Egyptian revolutions whereby Libyan state security forces under his authority were ordered to use all means necessarily to quell public protests against his government. From 15 February 2011 until at least 28 February 2011, forces from government-organized militias, the national police, the Libyan military, the Revolutionary Guard Corps, and other security services, acting under Gaddafi's orders, allegedly murdered hundreds of civilians and committed "inhuman acts that severely deprived the civilian population of its fundamental rights" in the cities of Ajdabiya, Bayda, Benghazi, Derna, Misrata, Tobruk, and Tripoli. Gaddafi was killed in the Libyan city of Sirte on 20 October 2011 and the Court terminated proceedings against him on 22 November 2011.

=== Saif al-Islam Gaddafi ===
Saif al-Islam Gaddafi was indicted on 27 June 2011 on two counts of crimes against humanity with regard to the situation in Libya. Although not an official member of the Libyan government, Saif al-Islam Gaddafi is alleged to have been the de facto prime minister and the "unspoken successor and the most influential person" to Muammar Gaddafi, the de facto head of state. Saif al-Islam Gaddafi, in conjunction with Muammar Gaddafi and his inner circle of advisers, allegedly planned a policy of violent oppression in response to the 2011 Tunisian and Egyptian revolutions that was implemented in the early weeks of the Libyan civil war. From 15 February 2011 until at least 28 February 2011, forces from government-organized militias, the national police, the Armed Forces of Libya, the Revolutionary Guard Corps, and other security services allegedly followed the policy and used all means necessarily to quell public protests against Muammar Gaddafi's government. They allegedly murdered hundreds of civilians and committed "inhuman acts that severely deprived the civilian population of its fundamental rights" in the cities of Ajdabiya, Bayda, Benghazi, Derna, Misrata, Tobruk, and Tripoli. Saif al-Islam Gaddafi was detained by members of a revolutionary militia on 19 November 2011 near the Libyan town of Ubari and taken to the city of Zintan. In 2012, Libyan authorities stated their intention to try Gaddafi in Libya. However, on 10 December 2014 the Pre-Trial Chamber found Libya in non-compliance with several of its orders, including an order to transfer Gaddafi to its custody, and accordingly it referred Libya to the Security Council. On 9 June 2017, the militia that had been holding Gaddafi since 2011 freed him from custody. On 3 February 2026, Gaddafi was shot and killed by unidentified gunmen in Zintan.

=== Yoav Gallant ===
Yoav Gallant was indicted on 21 November 2024 alongside Benjamin Netanyahu for war crimes and crimes against humanity committed during the Gaza war, including the use of starvation as a method of warfare, murder, persecution, and other inhumane acts.

=== Laurent Gbagbo ===
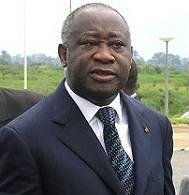
Laurent Gbagbo in October 2007

Laurent Gbagbo was indicted on 23 November 2011 on four counts of crimes against humanity with regard to the situation in the Republic of Côte d'Ivoire. As the President of Côte d'Ivoire, Gbagbo is alleged to have organized, along with members of his inner circle, systematic attacks against civilians during post-election violence that began on 28 November 2010. National security forces, the National Armed Forces, militias, and mercenaries under the command of Gbagbo are alleged to have murdered, raped, persecuted, and inhumanly treated civilians who were perceived to be supporters of Alassane Ouattara, Gbagbo's opponent in the 2010 presidential election. According to the arrest warrant for Gbagbo, the crimes occurred in and around Abidjan, including in the vicinity of the Golf Hotel, and in the western part of the country from 16 December 2010 to 12 April 2011. Gbagbo was detained by forces loyal to Ouattara in the presidential residence on 11 April 2011. On 29 November 2011, Gbagbo was transferred to the Court. On 5 December 2011 he made his first appearance before the Court and the confirmation of charges hearing took place from 19 to 28 February 2013 before the pre-trial chamber and on 12 June 2014 it confirmed all the charges against him. On 11 March 2015, the Trial Chamber joined the cases against Charles Blé Goudé and Laurent Gbagbo. The trial in the case began on 28 January 2016.

Gbagbo and Goudé were acquitted on 15 January 2019 and their release was ordered.

=== Simone Gbagbo ===
Simone Gbagbo was indicted on 29 February 2012 on four counts of crimes against humanity with regard to the situation in the Republic of Côte d'Ivoire. As the wife of Ivorian President Laurent Gbagbo, Ms. Gbagbo is alleged to have co-organized, as a member of her husband's inner circle of advisers, a policy targeting against civilians during post-election violence that began on 28 November 2010. National security forces, the National Armed Forces, militias, and mercenaries acting pursuant to the policy are alleged to have murdered, raped, persecuted, and inhumanly treated civilians who were perceived to be supporters of Alassane Ouattara, Laurent Gbagbo's opponent in the 2010 presidential election. According to the arrest warrant, the crimes occurred in and around Abidjan, including in the vicinity of the Golf Hotel, and in the western part of the country from 16 December 2010 to 12 April 2011. Gbagbo was detained by Ivorian forces loyal to Ouattara in the presidential residence on 11 April 2011. On 22 November 2012 the warrant of arrest was unsealed. On 11 December 2014, the Pre-Trial Chamber dismissed Côte d'Ivoire's challenge to the admissibility of the case, finding that the domestic investigation was deficient and that Côte d'Ivoire's obligation to transfer Gbagbo to the Court remained in force. Irrespective of the Pre-Trial Chamber's order, the domestic prosecution in Côte d'Ivoire of Gbagbo continued, and on 10 March 2015 a court sentenced her to 20 years' imprisonment for "undermining state security, disturbing public order and organising armed gangs" during the post-election violence. However, on 7 August 2018, Ivorian President Ouattara pardoned Gbagbo along with hundreds of other people convicted of post-election violence.

=== Ahmed Haroun ===
Ahmed Haroun was indicted on 27 April 2007 on 20 counts of crimes against humanity and 22 counts of war crimes with regard to the situation in Darfur, Sudan. He is alleged to have coordinated the operations of Sudanese military, police, security, and Janjaweed forces in the Darfur region while he was Minister of State for the Interior from April 2003 to September 2005 during the Darfur conflict. These forces were allegedly aided and encouraged by Haroun to attack Fur civilian populations, specifically those in the towns of Arawala, Bindisi, Kodoom, Mukjar, and the surrounding areas. Civilian populations were subject to persecution, murder, forcible transfer, rape, imprisonment, torture, sexual abuse, and other inhumane acts. Additionally, property was allegedly destroyed and the towns were pillaged. Since his indictment, Haroun continued to play an active role in the Sudanese government, which refused to cooperate with the Court, for several years. He served as Sudan's Minister of State for Humanitarian Affairs until May 2009 when he was appointed Governor of South Kordofan.

=== Abdel Rahim Hussein ===
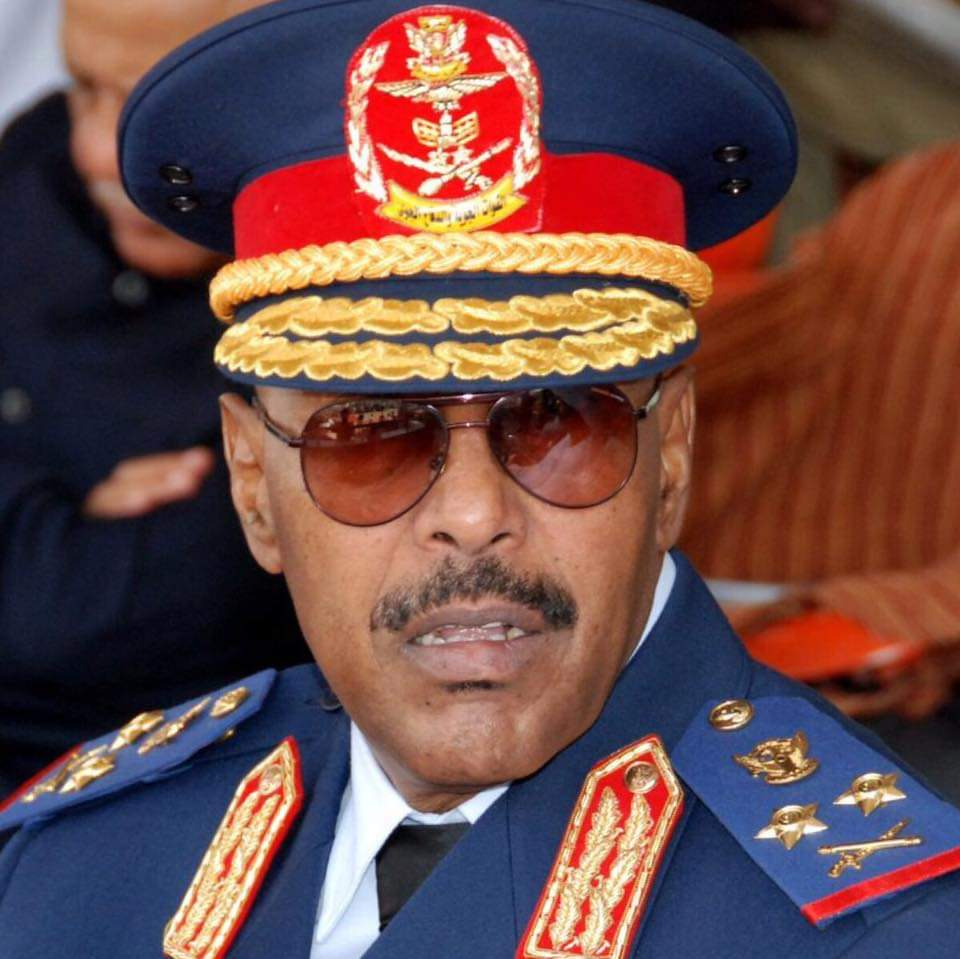
Abdel Rahim Hussein in July 2011

Abdel Rahim Hussein was indicted on 1 March 2012 on 13 counts of crimes against humanity and six counts of war crimes with regard to the situation in Darfur, Sudan. As the Minister of the Interior and Special Representative of the President to Darfur, Hussein is alleged to have contributed to the organization and command of government and allied Janjaweed forces in 2003 during the Darfur conflict. Between August 2003 and March 2004 these forces attacked Fur, Masalit, and Zaghawa civilians who were perceived to be loyal to rebel groups such as the Sudan Liberation Movement/Army and the Justice and Equality Movement. Government and Janjaweed forces are alleged to have attacked civilians and pillaged in and around the towns of Arawala, Bindisi, Kodoom, and Mukjar. During the attacks they are accused of persecuting the civilian populations by committing acts of murder, rape, sexual violence, imprisonment, torture, forcible transfer, and other inhumane acts. Hussein continued to play an active role in the Sudanese government (which has refused to cooperate with the Court) where he served as Minister of Defense.

=== Saleh Jerbo ===
Saleh Jerbo was indicted on 27 August 2009 on three counts of war crimes with regard to the situation in Darfur, Sudan. Jerbo is alleged to have been a commander of a splinter group of the Sudan Liberation Movement/Army (SLM/A), a rebel group that fought in the Darfur conflict against the Sudanese government. He is accused of leading SLM/A forces under his command (in conjunction with other rebel forces) in a raid on the Haskanita base of the African Union Mission in Sudan (AMIS) on 29 September 2007, in which 12 AMIS peacekeepers were killed and eight were seriously injured; the base was also extensively damaged. Jerbo is accused of ordering murders, pillaging, and "intentionally directing attacks against personnel, installations, materials, units and vehicles involved in a peacekeeping mission". Jerbo was summoned to appear before the Court on 17 June 2010 and the confirmation of charges hearing was held on 8 December 2010, in conjunction with the case against Abdallah Banda. On 7 March 2011 Pre-Trial Chamber I confirmed all the charges against him. On 22 April 2013 Radio Dabanga reported that Jerbo had been killed on 19 April in a battle between the Justice and Equality Movement and a splinter group in which Jerbo was a commander. On 4 October 2013, the Court terminated the proceedings against Jerbo "without prejudice to resume such proceedings should information become available that he is alive".

=== Germain Katanga ===
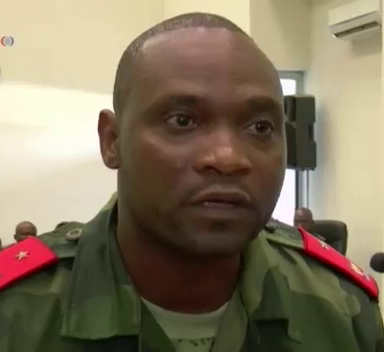
Germain Katanga in May 2016

Germain Katanga was indicted on 2 July 2007 on three counts of crimes against humanity and six counts of war crimes with regard to the situation in the Democratic Republic of the Congo (DRC). On 26 June 2008, the charges were revised to four counts of crimes against humanity and nine counts of war crimes. He was alleged to have been the leader of the Front for Patriotic Resistance in Ituri (FRPI), an armed group composed mostly of members of the Ngiti ethnicity that was active during the Ituri conflict. On and around 24 February 2003, he is alleged to have ordered his forces to attack the village of Bogoro in a military operation coordinated with the Nationalist and Integrationist Front (FNI), an allied armed group composed mostly of members of the Lendu ethnicity. The target of the attack was alleged to have been both the village's predominantly Hema civilian population and the base of the Hema armed group, the Union of Congolese Patriots (UPC), located in the center of the village. Katanga is alleged to be responsible for the resulting crimes committed by FRPI and FNI fighters, including the intentional attack on the civilian population of Bogoro, the destruction and pillaging of Bogoro, the killing of at least 200 civilians, the use of child soldiers during the attack, rape, outrages upon personal dignity, "inhumane acts of intentionally inflicting serious injuries upon civilian residents", and "cruel treatment of civilian residents of, or persons present at Bogoro village [...] by detaining them, menacing them with weapons, and imprisoning them in a room filled with corpses".

Katanga was arrested by Congolese authorities on 1 March 2005 in connection with an attack that killed nine United Nations peacekeepers. After the Court issued a warrant for his arrest, Katanga was transferred to the Court on 17 October 2007. His trial began on 24 November 2009. The Trial Chamber delivered the judgment in the case on 7 March 2014, finding Katanga guilty of four counts of war crimes and one count of crime against humanity. On 23 May 2014, Katanga was sentenced to 12 years' imprisonment. Although both the prosecution and the defense appealed the judgment and the sentence, both parties discontinued their appeals on 25 June 2014, thus ending the proceedings. On 13 November 2015, a panel of judges from the Appeals Chamber reduced Katanga's sentence of 12 years' imprisonment by 3 years and 8 months. The Court transferred Katanga to the Democratic Republic of the Congo on 19 December 2015 to serve his sentence. Katanga completed his sentence on 18 January 2016.

=== Uhuru Kenyatta ===
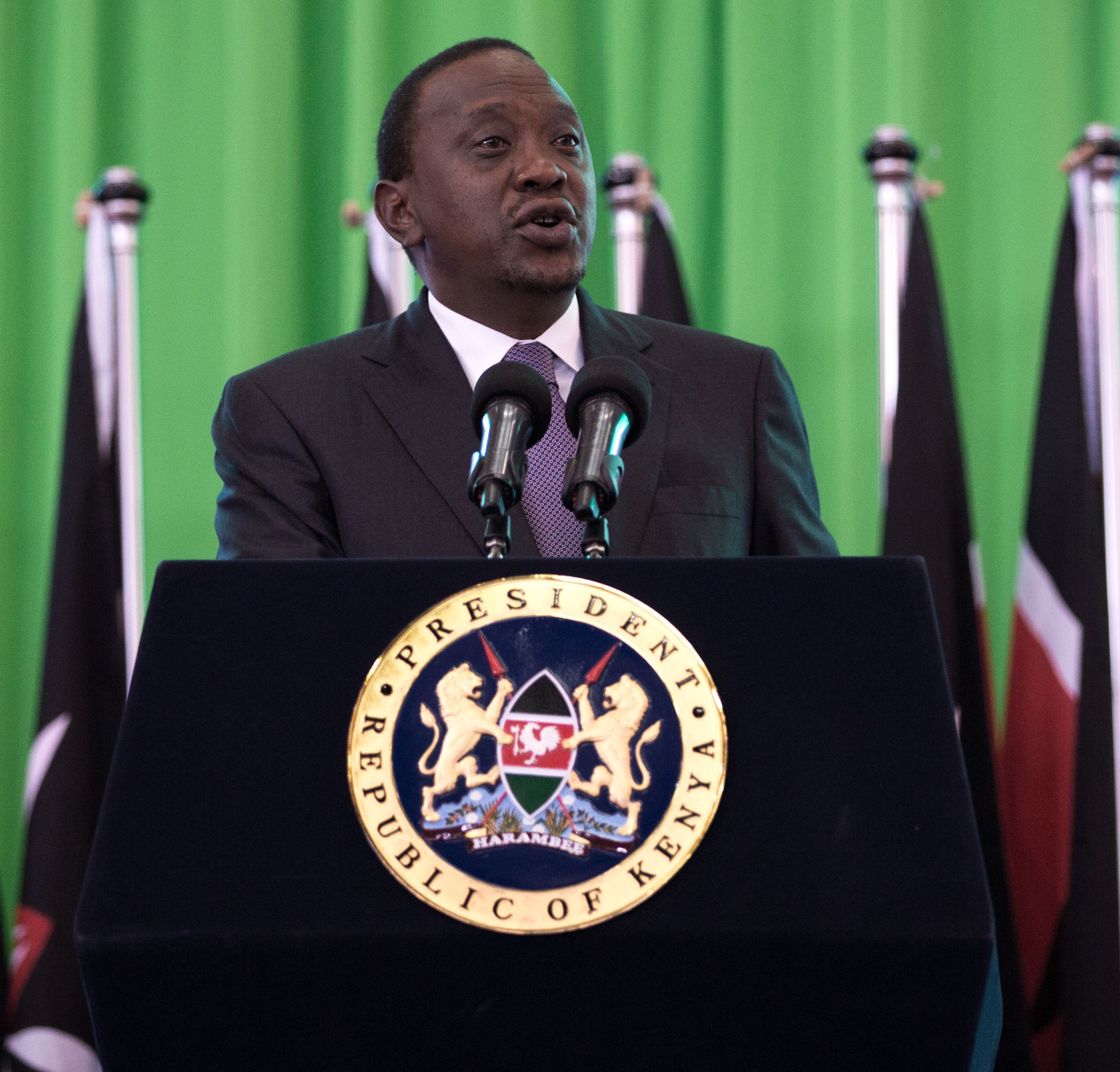
Uhuru Kenyatta in July 2015

Uhuru Kenyatta is the former President of the Republic of Kenya. He was indicted on 8 March 2011 on five counts of crimes against humanity with regard to the situation in the Republic of Kenya. Kenyatta, as a supporter of Kenyan President Mwai Kibaki, is alleged to have planned, financed, and coordinated the violence perpetrated against the perceived supporters of the Orange Democratic Movement, the political party of the President's rival, during post-election violence from 27 December 2007 to 29 February 2008. Kenyatta is alleged to have "had control over the Mungiki organization" and directed it to conduct murders, deportations, rapes and other forms of sexual violence, persecutions, and other inhumane acts against civilians in the towns of Kibera, Kisumu, Naivasha, and Nakuru. Kenyatta was summoned to appear before the Court on 8 April 2011 and the confirmation of charges hearing was held from 21 September 2011 to 5 October 2011, in conjunction with the cases against Mohammed Ali and Francis Muthaura. All the charges against Kenyatta were confirmed by Pre-Trial Chamber II on 23 January 2012. However, before the trial began, the Prosecutor announced on 3 December 2014 that she was withdrawing all of the charges. The Trial Chamber terminated the proceedings against Mr. Kenyatta on 13 March 2015.

=== Tohami Khaled ===
Tohami Khaled was indicted on 13 April 2013 on four counts of crimes against humanity and three counts of war crimes with regard to the situation in Libya. The arrest warrant against him was unsealed on 24 April 2017. Khaled served as the head of the Internal Security Agency ("ISA") of Libya from the beginning of the Libyan Civil War in February 2011 through August 2011. During that period, members of the ISA arrested persons who were perceived by the Libyan government to be opposed to the rule of the country's leader, Muammar Gaddafi. Persons arrested by the ISA "were subjected to various forms of mistreatment, including severe beatings, electrocution, acts of sexual violence and rape, solitary confinement, deprivation of food and water, inhumane conditions of detention, mock executions, threats of killing and rape". The ISA conducted these activities throughout Libya, including in the cities of Benghazi, Misrata, Sirte, Tajura, Tawergha, Tripoli, and Zawiya. Khaled is accused of being responsible for crimes against humanity and war crimes both as a participant and as the commander of the ISA. Specifically, the Prosecutor alleges that Khaled is responsible for the crimes against humanity of imprisonment, torture, other inhumane acts, and persecution and the war crimes of torture, cruel treatment, and outrages upon personal dignity. Khaled was believed to have fled to Egypt during the defeat of Gaddafi's forces and is currently still at large.

=== Joseph Kony ===
Joseph Kony was indicted on 8 July 2005 on 12 counts of crimes against humanity and 21 counts of war crimes with regard to the situation in Uganda. He is alleged to be the chairperson and commander-in-chief of the Lord's Resistance Army (LRA), an armed group which has been waging a guerrilla campaign since 1987 against the Ugandan government. According to the arrest warrant issued for him, since 1 July 2002 "the LRA has engaged in a cycle of violence and established a pattern of 'brutalization of civilians' by acts including murder, abduction, sexual enslavement, mutilation, as well as mass burnings of houses and looting of camp settlements" and furthermore "that abducted civilians, including children, are said to have been forcibly 'recruited' as fighters, porters and sex slaves to serve the LRA and to contribute to attacks against the Ugandan army and civilian communities". Kony is currently at large and his whereabouts are unknown, although he is suspected to be in either the Central African Republic or a nearby country.

=== Henry Kosgey ===
Henry Kosgey was indicted on 8 March 2011 on four counts of crimes against humanity with regard to the situation in the Republic of Kenya. He is alleged to have been the deputy leader and treasurer of an ad hoc organization created by members of the Kalenjin ethnic group to perpetrate violence on behalf of the Orange Democratic Movement (ODM) during post-election violence in December 2007 and January 2008. On 1 August 2011, the charges were reduced to three counts. At the time Kosgey was also Chairman of the ODM, which was the political party of presidential candidate Raila Odinga. Kosgey, as a top leader in the ad hoc Kalenjin organization, directed Kalenjin youths to target civilians of the Kikuyu, Kamba, and Kisii ethnic groups, which were perceived to be supporters of the Party of National Unity, the political party of Odinga's opponent during the election. Kosgey is alleged to be criminally responsible for the murder, deportation, torture, and persecution of civilians in the towns of Kapsabet, Nandi Hills, Turbo, and the greater Eldoret area. Kosgey first appeared before the Court, voluntarily, on 7 April 2011 and through the confirmation of charges hearing, which was held in conjunction with the cases against William Ruto and Joshua Sang. On 23 January 2012, Pre-Trial Chamber II decided not to confirm the charges against Kosgey therefore ending his proceedings before the Court.

=== Ali Kushayb ===
Ali Kushayb was indicted on 27 April 2007 on 22 counts of crimes against humanity and 28 counts of war crimes with regard to the situation in Darfur, Sudan. He is alleged to be "one of the most senior leaders in the tribal hierarchy in the Wadi Salih Locality" who commanded thousands of Janjaweed forces in the Darfur region from August 2003 to March 2004 during the Darfur conflict. Furthermore, it is alleged that he was the mediator between the Sudanese government and the Janjaweed and that he implemented the government's policy in the region of Darfur and that in so doing ordered attacks on civilian populations. Kushayb is alleged to have personally participated in the attack of the towns of Arawala, Bindisi, Kodoom, and Mukjar. These attacks allegedly resulted in the persecution, murder, forcible transfer, rape, imprisonment, torture, sexual violence, and inhumane treatment of civilians, as well as the destruction of property and pillaging of villages. The Sudanese government has refused to cooperate with the Court and to execute the warrant of arrest for Kushayb. However, in October 2008 it was reported that Kushayb was arrested by Sudanese officials in connection to war crimes allegedly committed in Darfur. Despite the arrest, no evidence of any further proceedings has emerged. It is also not clear if Kushayb is in detention and his whereabouts are not publicly known.

=== Thomas Lubanga Dyilo ===
Thomas Lubanga Dyilo was indicted on 10 February 2006 on three counts of war crimes with regard to the situation in the Democratic Republic of the Congo (DRC). He was alleged to have been the founding leader of the Union of Congolese Patriots (UCP), a rebel movement in the northeast part of the DRC, as well as the founding commander-in-chief of the UCP's armed wing, the Patriotic Force for the Liberation of the Congo (FPLC). From July 2002 to December 2003, the UCP and the FPLC allegedly fought in the Ituri conflict under the command of Lubanga Dyilo. Lubanga Dyilo is accused of conscripting and enlisting children to the FPLC and of using them "to participate actively in hostilities". Lubanga Dyilo was arrested on 19 March 2005 by Congolese authorities after allegedly ordering an attack on UN peacekeepers; following the indictment in 2006 and the subsequent arrest warrant, Congolese authorities transferred Lubanga Dyilo to the Court's custody on 16 March 2006. On 9 to 28 November 2006, the confirmation of charges hearing was held and all the charges where confirmed on 29 January 2007. His trial began on 26 January 2009 and ended with his conviction of all three counts on 14 March 2012. On 10 July 2012 he was sentenced to 14 years' imprisonment. On 1 December 2014, the Appeals Chamber upheld both the conviction and the sentence. The Court transferred Lubanga Dyilo to the Democratic Republic of the Congo on 19 December 2015 to serve his sentence.

=== Raska Lukwiya ===
Raska Lukwiya was indicted on 8 July 2005 on one count of crimes against humanity and three counts of war crimes with regard to the situation in Uganda. He was alleged to be a former general and commander of the Lord's Resistance Army (LRA), an armed group which has been waging a guerrilla campaign since 1987 against the Ugandan government. According to the arrest warrant issued for him, sometime after 1 July 2002 (the date the Rome Statute entered into force) he allegedly ordered his forces to carry out attacks against internally displaced person camps which were pillaged and resulted in attacks on, enslavement of and cruel treatment of civilians. On 12 August 2006 the Ugandan military killed Lukwiya in a battle with LRA forces. Following the confirmation of his death, the Court terminated proceedings against Lukwiya on 11 July 2007.

=== Maria Lvova-Belova ===
On 17 March 2023, ICC judges issued an arrest warrant for Maria Lvova-Belova, Russia's Children's Rights Commissioner, for war crimes committed during the Russian invasion of Ukraine. Among the charges is the forcible taking of Ukrainian children by Russian forces.

=== Ahmad al-Mahdi ===
Ahmad al-Mahdi was indicted on 18 September 2015 with one count of war crimes with regard to the situation in Mali. Al-Mahdi was alleged to have been the leader of Ansar Dine's "morality brigade" during the time that it and al-Qaeda in the Islamic Maghreb controlled Timbuktu during the Northern Mali conflict. It is alleged that between about 30 June 2012 to 10 July 2012 he directed and participated in an attack against at least nine mausoleums and one mosque in the city. The majority of the sites attacked constitute a World Heritage Site. He was indicted for the war crime of "intentionally directing attacks against buildings dedicated to religion and/or historical monuments." On 26 September 2015 he was transferred by the government of Niger to the custody of the Court, and arrived the same day at the detention center in The Hague. He made his first appearance before the Court on 30 September 2015. The confirmation of charges hearing took place on 1 March 2016 before Pre-Trial Chamber I, which confirmed the sole charge against al-Mahdi on 24 March 2016. The trial commenced on 22 August 2016, during which al-Mahdi pleaded guilty to the charge. On 27 September 2016 the trial chamber found al-Mahdi guilty and sentenced him to nine years' imprisonment.

=== Callixte Mbarushimana ===
Callixte Mbarushimana was indicted on 28 September 2010 on five counts of crimes against humanity and six counts of war crimes with regard to the situation in the Democratic Republic of the Congo (DRC). He is alleged to have been the Executive Secretary of the Democratic Forces for the Liberation of Rwanda (FDLR), a Hutu Power rebel group fighting in the Kivu conflict, since July 2007 and the de facto President since November 2009. Since January 2009 Mbarushimana is accused of commanding FDLR troops that have attacked civilians in 11 different villages in the North and South Kivu Provinces in the eastern DRC. These attacks are alleged of resulting in the destruction of property and the murder, torture, rape, inhumane treatment, and persecution of civilians. Mbarushimana was arrested in France on 11 October 2010 and transferred to the Court on 25 January 2011. On 16 December 2011, Pre-Trial Chamber I ruled to decline to confirm the charges against him and ordered his release. The Prosecutor's appeal against the decision was rejected, and on 23 December 2011, Mbarushimana became the first person to be detained by the ICC and then set free; at his request, he was released in France.

=== Sylvestre Mudacumura ===
Sylvestre Mudacumura was indicted on 13 July 2012 on nine counts of war crimes with regard to the situation in the Democratic Republic of the Congo (DRC). He is alleged to be the commander-in-chief of the Democratic Forces for the Liberation of Rwanda (FDLR), a Hutu Power rebel group fighting in the Kivu conflict. Mudacumura is alleged to have commanded FDLR troops which committed war crimes in the course of attacks against the Congolese armed forces in the villages of Busurungi, Kipopo, Malembe, Manje, Mianga, and the surrounding areas, in North and South Kivu Provinces in the eastern DRC between 20 January 2009 and 30 September 2010. During the attacks it is alleged that FDLR troops attacked civilian populations, murdered, raped, mutilated, treated cruelly, tortured, conducted outrages upon personal dignity, destroyed property, and pillaged. Mudacumura continued to lead the FDLR in the eastern DRC until he was shot dead by DRC forces on the night of 17/18 September 2019.

=== Francis Muthaura ===
Francis Muthaura was indicted on 8 March 2011 with five counts of crimes against humanity with regard to the situation in the Republic of Kenya. As the Head of the Public Service, Secretary to the Cabinet, and Chairman of the National Security and Advisory Committee of Kenyan President Mwai Kibaki, he is alleged to have planned, financed, and coordinated the violent response against the perceived supporters of the Orange Democratic Movement (ODM), the political party of the President's rival, during post-election violence from 27 December 2007 to 29 February 2008. Specifically, Muthaura is alleged to have directed and paid Mungiki forces loyal to the president to attack civilians and instructed Mohammed Ali, the Commissioner of the Kenya Police, not to intervene against Mungiki forces. Muthaura is allegedly criminally responsible for murders, deportations, rapes and other forms of sexual violence, persecutions, and other inhumane acts perpetrated by Mungiki forces against civilians who were perceived to be loyal to the ODM in the towns of Kibera, Kisumu, Naivasha, and Nakuru. Muthaura was summoned to appear before the court on 8 April 2011 and the confirmation of charges hearing was held from 21 September 2011 to 5 October 2011, in conjunction with the cases against Mohammed Ali and Uhuru Kenyatta. On 11 March 2013, the prosecutor announced that her office would withdraw all charges against Muthaura, citing a lack of cooperation from the Kenyan government, the death and killing of witnesses, and the recantation of testimony by a key witness who was bribed by agents of the accused. On 18 March 2013, the Trial Chamber granted the prosecutor permission to withdraw the charges and terminated all proceedings against Muthaura.

=== Benjamin Netanyahu ===
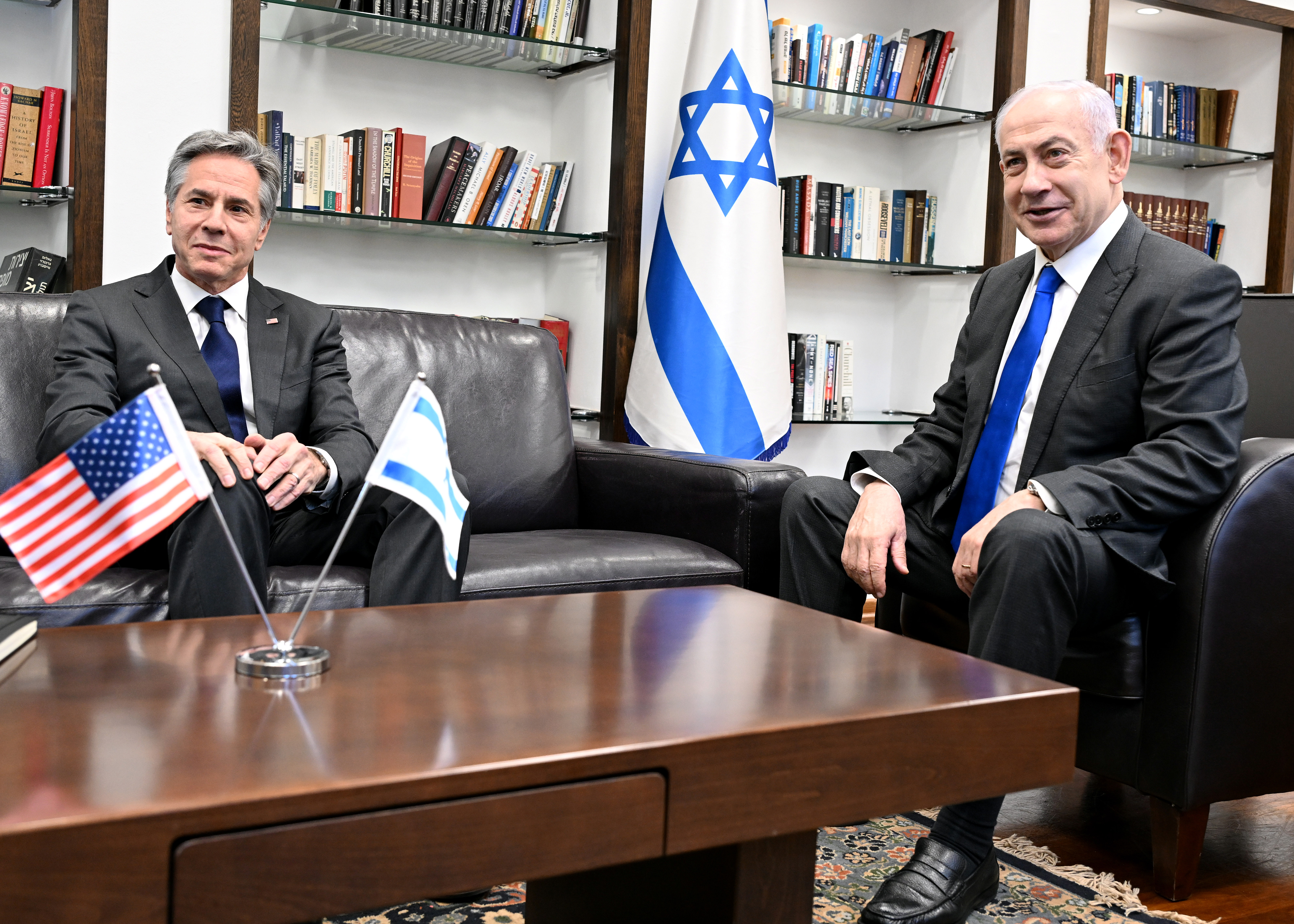
Israeli Prime Minister Benjamin Netanyahu (right), 22 March 2024

Benjamin Netanyahu was indicted on 21 November 2024 for war crimes and crimes against humanity committed during the Gaza war, including the use of starvation as a method of warfare, murder, persecution, and other inhumane acts.

=== Mathieu Ngudjolo Chui ===
Mathieu Ngudjolo Chui was indicted on 6 July 2007 on three counts of crimes against humanity and six counts of war crimes with regard to the situation in the Democratic Republic of the Congo (DRC). He was alleged to have been the commander of the Nationalist and Integrationist Front (FNI), an armed group involved in the Ituri conflict. On and around 23 February 2003, he was alleged to have led his forces into the village of Bogoro and ordered them to indiscriminately attack its civilian population in coordination with another armed group, the Front for Patriotic Resistance in Ituri (FRPI). The attack resulted in 200 civilian deaths. Ngudjolo Chui was accused of ordering his forces to attack, murder, sexually enslave, and inhumanely treat civilians in and around Bogoro. He was also accused being criminally responsible for destroying property, pillaging the village, and using children to participate in the attack. After the Court issued an arrest warrant, Ngudjolo Chui was detained on 6 February 2008 by Congolese authorities, transferred to the Court the next day, and made he his first appeared before the Court on 11 February 2008./ On 10 March 2008 the case against him was joined with the case against Germain Katanga, but the case was severed on 21 November 2012. The confirmation of charges hearing was held from 27 June 2008 to 18 July 2008 and on 26 September 2008 the Pre-Trial Chamber confirms all but three charges against Ngudjolo Chui. His trial began on 24 November 2009 and on 18 December 2012, Trial Chamber II delivered the judgment acquitting Ngudjolo Chui. The Prosecutor appealed the judgment, but the Appeals Chamber upheld the acquittal on 27 February 2015.

=== Bosco Ntaganda ===
Bosco Ntaganda was indicted on 22 August 2006 on three counts of war crimes with regard to the situation in the Democratic Republic of the Congo (DRC). On 13 July 2012 he was additionally charged with three counts of crimes against humanity and four counts of war crimes. He is alleged to be a third highest-ranking official in the Patriotic Force for the Liberation of the Congo (FPLC), the armed wing of the Union of Congolese Patriots (UCP), a rebel movement in the northeast part of the DRC, that fought in the Ituri conflict. From July 2002 to December 2003, Ntaganda is alleged to have ordered FPLC troops to conscript and enlist children to the FPLC and UCP, and of using them "to participate actively in hostilities". He is also alleged to have ordered attacks on Lendu and other non-Hema civilian populations in the town of Mongbwalu and the villages of Bambu, Kobu, Lipri, and Sayo, and the surrounding areas, from 1 September 2002 until 30 September 2003. In the course of the attacks, murders, rapes, and other forms of sexual violence were allegedly committed and homes were pillaged, resulting in the death of approximately 800 civilians and the displacement of 60,000. The finalized charges against Ntaganda were filed on 10 January 2014, and listed a total of 18 charges: five crimes against humanity and 13 war crimes.

The Congolese government refused to arrest him and in 2009 Ntaganda became a general in the armed forces in the city of Goma in North Kivu province. In April 2012 he and his troops defected from the military and left Goma to form the March 23 Movement, an armed group that began attacking villages and towns around Goma. Ntaganda was an alleged leader of the group and since his defection the Congolese government announced its intentions to arrest him. On 18 March 2013, following reports of clashes between factions of the March 23 Movement, Ntaganda fled to Rwanda and entered the Embassy of the United States in Kigali. He requested that the United States facilitate his surrender the Court. On 22 March, the ICC took custody of Ntaganda and transferred him to The Hague. His first appearance before the Court took place on 26 March 2013. The confirmation of charges hearing occurred from 10 to 14 February 2014 and on 9 June 2014 all the charges against Ntaganda were confirmed by the pre-trial chamber. The trial in the case began on 2 September 2015. Ntaganda was found guilty on all counts of Crimes against humanity and War Crimes on 8 July 2019.

=== Okot Odhiambo ===
Okot Odhiambo was indicted on 8 July 2005 on three counts of crimes against humanity and seven counts of war crimes in regard to the situation in Uganda. He is alleged to be an integral member of the policy-making leadership of the Lord's Resistance Army (LRA), an armed group which has been waging a guerrilla campaign since 1987 against the Ugandan government. Additionally, he was also a military commander and sometime after 1 July 2002 (the date the Rome Statute entered into force) he allegedly issued "standing orders to attack and brutalise civilian populations". These attacks on civilian populations allegedly resulted in murder, pillaging of camps, enslavement, and the forcible conscription of children. In 2014, an LRA defector claimed that the Ugandan military wounded Odhiambo in October 2013 during an ambush in the Central African Republic and that he later died from his injuries. In February 2015, Ugandan officials announced that they had exhumed a grave believed to contain Odhiambo's remains and were conducting DNA testing on the remains. Ugandan authorities confirmed that the remains were Odhiambo's and issued a death certificate stating that he died on 27 October 2013 near Djemah, Central African Republic. Accordingly, the Court terminated proceedings against Odhiambo on 10 September 2015.

=== Dominic Ongwen ===
Dominic Ongwen was indicted on 8 July 2005 on three counts of crimes against humanity and four counts of war crimes in regard to the situation in Uganda. He was allegedly a military commander and a member of the leadership of the Lord's Resistance Army (LRA), an armed group which has been waging a guerrilla campaign since 1987 against the Ugandan government. On 22 December 2015, the charges were expanded to 34 counts of crimes against humanity and 36 counts of war crimes. The Prosecutor alleges that from before July 2002 to at least December 2005 Ongwen commanded a brigade, and later a battalion, of LRA soldiers during "a widespread or systematic attack directed against the civilian population of northern Uganda." The campaign included attacks against four internally displaced person camps: Pajule on 10 October 2003, Odek on 29 April 2004, Lukodi on 20 May 2004, and Abok on 8 June 2004. During such attacks, troops under Ongwen's command pillaged the camps and murdered, tortured, enslaved, and inflicted cruel treatment and inhumane acts on civilians. During the overall campaign directed against the civilian population, troops under Ongwen's command also persecuted the civilian population, forced woman into "marriages" and sexual slavery, committed rape, and conscripted and used child soldiers. Ongwen surrendered to United States military advisors assisting Ugandan forces on 6 January 2014 in the Central African Republic. The Court took custody of Ongwen on 17 January 2015 and he was transferred to the Court's detention center on 21 January 2015. He made his first appearance before the Court on 26 January 2015. The confirmation of charges hearing took place from 21 to 27 January 2016 before Pre-Trial Chamber II, which confirmed all the charges on 23 March 2016. The trial in the case began on 6 December 2016.

=== Vincent Otti ===
Vincent Otti was indicted on 8 July 2005 on 11 counts of crimes against humanity and 21 counts of war crimes in regard to the situation in Uganda. He was allegedly a military commander and the second-in-command of the Lord's Resistance Army (LRA), an armed group which has been waging a guerrilla campaign since 1987 against the Ugandan government. Sometime after 1 July 2002 (the date the Rome Statute entered into force) he allegedly issued orders to attack civilian populations. These attacks allegedly resulted in sexual enslavement, rape, forcible conscription of children into the LRA, enslavement, cruel treatment, murders, pillaging of camps, and other inhumane acts. In December 2007, BBC News reported that on 2 October 2007 Otti had been executed on orders from Joseph Kony, the commander-in-chief of the LRA. Kony later confirmed that Otti was dead to Riek Machar, a mediator between the Ugandan government and the LRA. The ICC terminated all proceedings against Otti on November 17th, 2023 after an investigation confirmed his death.

=== Vladimir Putin ===
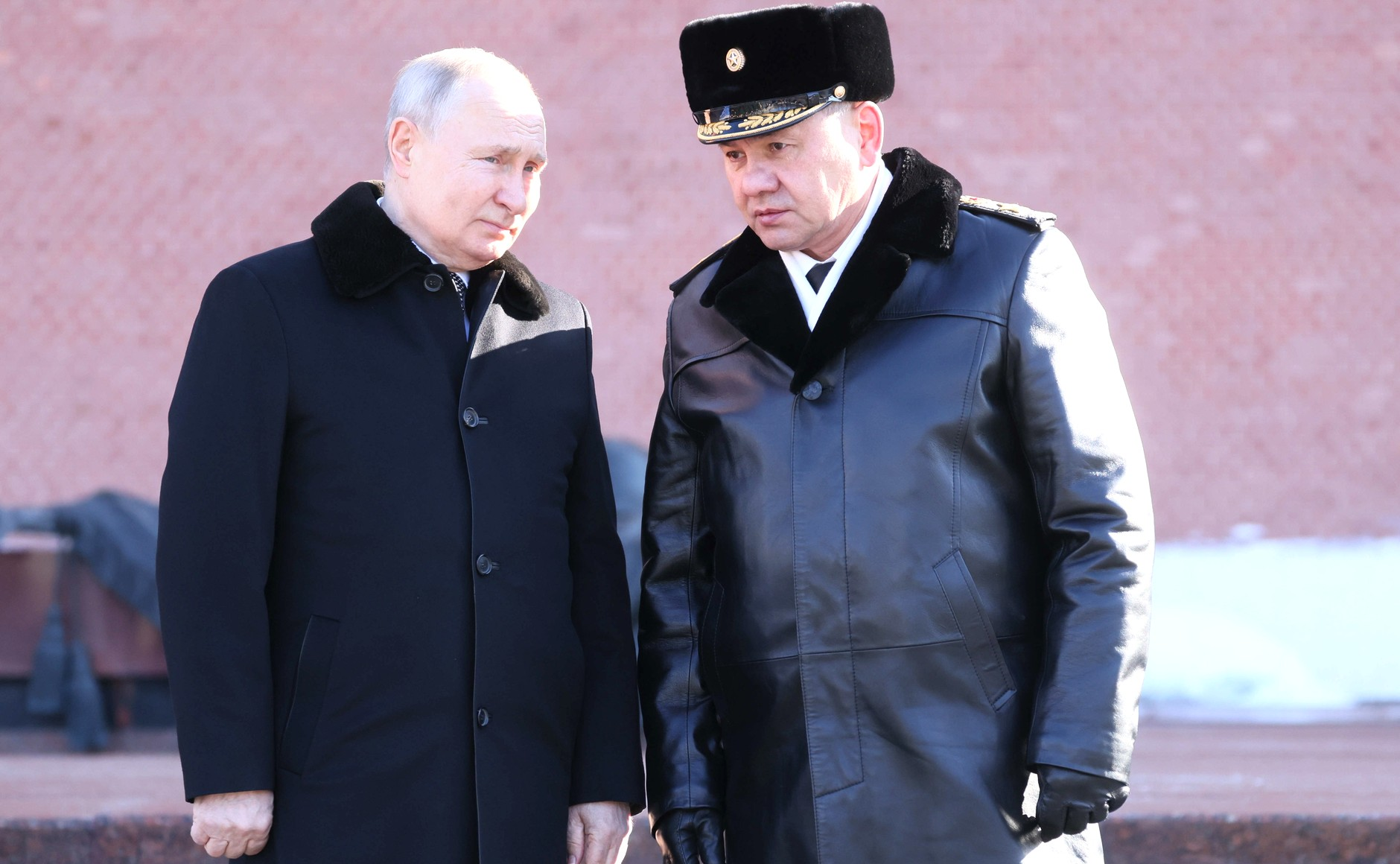
Russian President Vladimir Putin and Defense Minister Sergei Shoigu, 23 February 2023

On 17 March 2023, ICC judges issued an arrest warrant for Russian president Vladimir Putin for war crimes committed during the Russian invasion of Ukraine. Among the charges is the forcible taking of Ukrainian children by Russian forces.

=== William Ruto ===
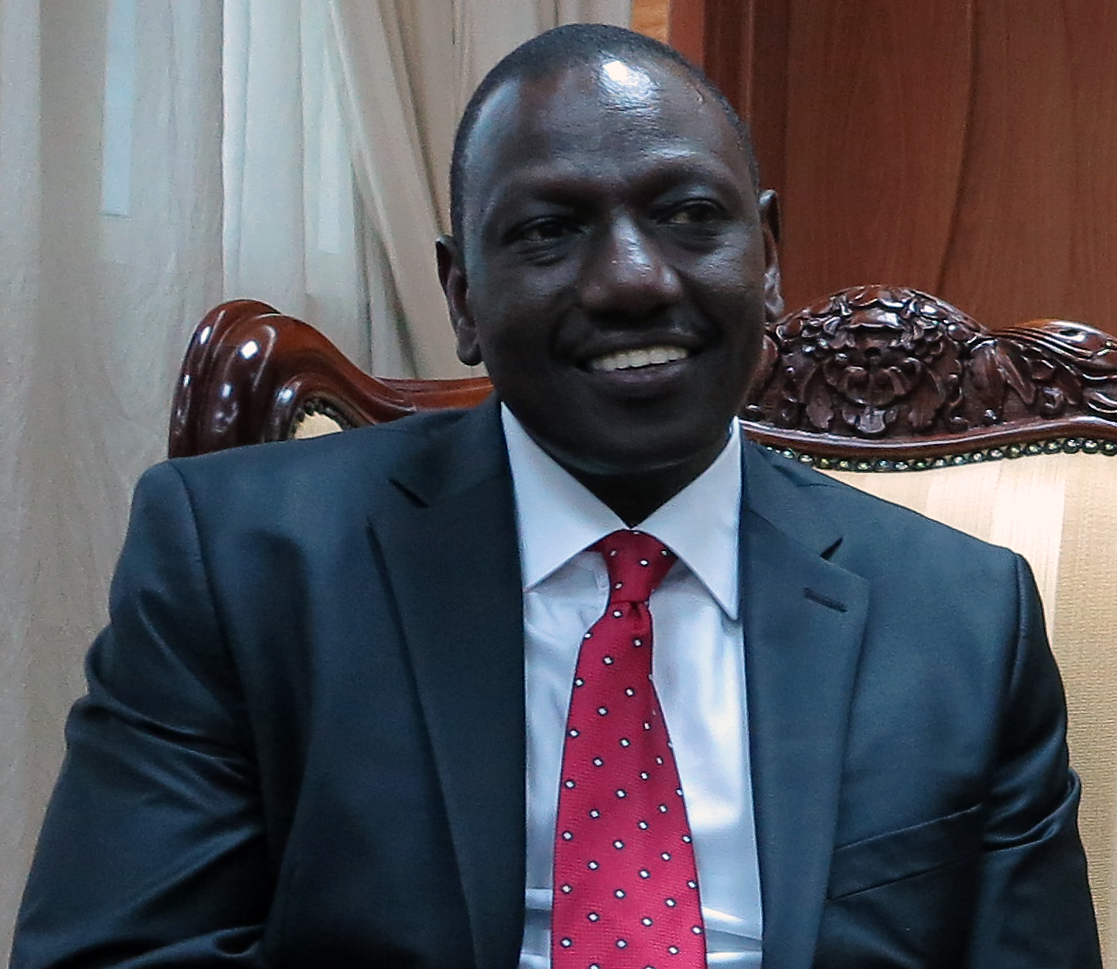
William Ruto in July 2014

William Ruto is the current President of Kenya. He was indicted on 8 March 2011 on four counts of crimes against humanity with regard to the situation in the Republic of Kenya. He is alleged to be the leader of an ad hoc organization created by members of the Kalenjin ethnic group which was created to perpetrate violence on behalf of the Orange Democratic Movement (ODM), the political party of presidential candidate Raila Odinga, during post-election violence in December 2007 and January 2008. On 1 August 2011, the charges were reduced to three counts. Ruto, as the a top leader in the ad hoc Kalenjin organization, directed Kalenjin youths to target civilians of the Kikuyu, Kamba, and Kisii ethnic groups, which were perceived to be supporters of the Party of National Unity, the political party of Odinga's opponent during the election. Ruto is alleged to be criminally responsible for the murder, deportation, torture, and persecution of civilians in the towns of Kapsabet, Nandi Hills, Turbo, the greater Eldoret area. Ruto first appeared before the Court, voluntarily, on 7 April 2011 and through the confirmation of charges hearing, which was held in conjunction with the cases against Henry Kosgey and Joshua Sang. All the charges against Ruto were confirmed by Pre-Trial Chamber II on 23 January 2012 Ruto's trial began on 10 September 2013, in conjunction with the case against Joshua Sang, but the Trial Chamber vacated the charges against both accused on 5 April 2016, ending the proceedings in the case.

=== Joshua Sang ===
Joshua Sang was indicted on 8 March 2011 on four counts of crimes against humanity with regard to the situation in the Republic of Kenya. He is alleged to a top leader of an ad hoc organization created by members of the Kalenjin ethnic group which was created to perpetrate violence on behalf of the Orange Democratic Movement (ODM), the political party of presidential candidate Raila Odinga, during post-election violence in December 2007 and January 2008. On 1 August 2011, the charges were reduced to three counts. As a broadcaster for the Kass FM radio station, Sang incited Kalenjin youths to target civilians of the Kikuyu, Kamba, and Kisii ethnic groups, which were perceived to be supporters of the Party of National Unity, the political party of Odinga's opponent during the election. He is alleged to be indirectly responsible for the murder, deportation, torture, and persecution of civilians in the towns of Kapsabet, Nandi Hills, Turbo, the greater Eldoret area. Sang first appeared before the Court, voluntarily, on 7 April 2011 and through the confirmation of charges hearing, which was held in conjunction with the cases against William Ruto and Henry Kosgey. All the charges against Sang were confirmed by Pre-Trial Chamber II on 23 January 2012 Sang's trial began on 10 September 2013, in conjunction with the case against William Ruto, but the Trial Chamber vacated the charges against both accused on 5 April 2016, ending the proceedings in the case.

=== Abdullah Senussi ===
Abdullah Senussi was indicted on 27 June 2011 on two counts of crimes against humanity in regard to the situation in Libya. As the head of military intelligence in Libya he is alleged to have planned, in conjunction with Muammar Gaddafi, the head of state, and his inner circle, formulated a plan in response to the 2011 Tunisian and Egyptian revolutions whereby Libyan state security forces under his authority were ordered to use all means necessarily to quell public protests against his regime. The plan was later implemented in the early weeks of the 2011 Libyan civil war. From 15 February 2011 until at least 28 February 2011 forces from government-organized militias, the national police, the Libyan Armed Forces, the Revolutionary Guard Corps, and other security services allegedly murdered hundreds of civilians and committed "inhuman acts that severely deprived the civilian population of its fundamental rights" in the cities of Ajdabiya, Bayda, Benghazi, Derna, Misrata, Tobruk, and Tripoli. Furthermore, Senussi commanded forces in and around Benghazi and "directly instructed the troops to attack civilians demonstrating in the city". Senussi was arrested on 17 March 2012 at Nouakchott International Airport in Mauritania after he arrived on a flight from Casablanca, Morocco with a fake Malian passport. On 5 September 2012 he was extradited to Libya. On 11 October 2013, Pre-Trial Chamber I ruled that the case against Senussi was inadmissible before the ICC because of ongoing proceedings against him in Libya. On 24 July 2014, the Appeals Chamber confirmed the decision.

=== Mahmoud al-Werfalli ===
Mahmoud al-Werfalli was indicted on 15 August 2017 on one count of a war crime in regard to the situation in Libya. As a commander of al-Saiqa, an elite unit of the Libyan National Army, he is alleged to have personally carried out or ordered the execution of 33 prisoners during the Second Libyan Civil War. Following the 2011 Libyan civil war, in which rebels overthrew the regime of Muammar Gaddafi, the victorious armed forces splintered into various groups and began battling each other for control of Libya in 2014. Protracted hostilities took place in the city of Benghazi from October 2014 through 2017 between the Libyan National Army (LNA) and the Shura Council of Benghazi Revolutionaries. During this battle, from 3 June 2016 to 17 July 2017, al-Werfalli is alleged to have been responsible for the war crime of murder for the execution of 33 prisoners. The Court notes that seven incidents were recorded on video and circulated by al-Saiqa's social media accounts and depicted the "exceptionally cruel, dehumanising and degrading" killing of prisoners, who were shot at close range as they were either hooded, kneeling, or have their hands restrained. On 17 August 2017, the LNA arrested al-Werfalli and said that it was conducting an investigation of him. However, on 13 September 2017, the Office of the Prosecutor of the ICC stated that there were contradictory reports on whether he was arrested or not. He was shot dead on 24 March 2021 in Benghazi.

=== Osama Almasri Najim ===
On 19 January 2025, the Libyan general Osama Almasri Najim, the head of Libya's judicial police, was arrested after the Juventus–Milan match near the Juventus Stadium, in Turin, Italy, and transported to the Vallette prison. Almasri was indicted by the ICC for war crimes and crimes against humanity allegedly committed at the Mitiga Detention Centre, which Almasri oversaw from 2015 onwards. Subsequently, the court of appeal of Rome ordered his release on January 21 due to the irregularity of the arrest, which resulted from the lack of approval from the Ministry of Justice. After his release, the Libyan military officer was expelled and repatriated to Libya aboard a Falcon 900 aircraft of the Italian intelligence services.

On 5 November 2025, Almasri was arrested by the Libyan government for torture and rights violations.

== See also ==
- List of Axis personnel indicted for war crimes
- List of convicted war criminals
- List of people indicted in the International Criminal Tribunal for Rwanda
- List of people indicted in the International Criminal Tribunal for the former Yugoslavia
