= RGC =

RGC may refer to:

== Organisations and companies ==
- Revolutionary Guard Corps (Libyan paramilitary unit), a former Libyan paramilitary force
- RGC Ltd (Renison Goldfields Consolidated Ltd), a former Australian mining company
- Royal Glenora Club, a private sports and social club in Edmonton, Canada
- Royal Gendarmerie of Canada, the Royal Canadian Mounted Police
- Royal Government of Cambodia, the government of Cambodia

== Science ==
- Radial glial cell, progenitor cell responsible for producing neurons in the cerebral cortex
- Retinal ganglion cell, a type of neuron found in the retina of the eye

== Sport ==
- RGC 1404, a Welsh rugby union team based in Colwyn Bay
- Russian Government Cup, a bandy (ball sport) tournament

== Other uses ==
- Receiver General for Canada, a government officeholder in Canada
- Rio Grande City, Texas, United States
- Robert Gordon's College, a co-educational private school in Aberdeen, Scotland, UK

== See also ==
- Revolutionary Guard
