= International Criminal Court investigation in Kenya =

Situation in the Republic of Kenya
- The seal of the International Criminal Court
- File no.: 01/09
- Referred by: Pre-Trial Chamber II
- Date referred: 31 March 2010
- Date opened: 31 March 2010
- Incident(s): 2007–2008 Kenyan crisis
- Crimes: Crimes against humanity: · Deportation · Inhumane acts · Murder · Persecution · Rape

Status of suspects
- Mohammed Ali: Charges not confirmed
- Uhuru Kenyatta: Charges withdrawn
- Henry Kosgey: Charges not confirmed
- Francis Muthaura: Charges withdrawn
- William Ruto: Charges vacated
- Joshua Sang: Charges vacated
- Walter Barasa: Fugitive
- Paul Gicheru: Deceased
- Philip Bett: Fugitive

The International Criminal Court investigation in Kenya or the situation in the Republic of Kenya was an investigation by the International Criminal Court (ICC) into the responsibility for the 2007–2008 post-election violence in Kenya. The 2007–2008 crisis followed the presidential election that was held on 27 December 2007. The Electoral Commission of Kenya officially declared that the incumbent President Mwai Kibaki was re-elected however supporters of the opposition candidate Raila Odinga accused the government of electoral fraud and rejected the results. A series of protests and demonstrations followed, and fighting—mainly along ethnic lines—led to an estimated 1,200 deaths and more than 500,000 people becoming internally displaced.

After failed attempts to conduct a criminal investigation of the key perpetrators in Kenya, the matter was referred to the International Criminal Court in The Hague. In 2010, the Prosecutor of the ICC Luis Moreno Ocampo announced that he was seeking summonses for six people: Deputy Prime Minister Uhuru Kenyatta, Industrialisation Minister Henry Kosgey, Education Minister William Ruto, Cabinet Secretary Francis Muthaura, radio executive Joshua Arap Sang and former police commissioner Mohammed Hussein Ali. The six suspects, known colloquially as the "Ocampo six" were indicted by the ICC's Pre-Trial Chamber II on 8 March 2011 on charges of crimes against humanity and summoned to appear before the Court.

On 23 January 2012 Pre-Trial Chamber II confirmed the charges against Kenyatta, Muthaura, Sang and Ruto and dismissed the charges against Kosgey and Ali. The charges against Francis Muthaura and Uhuru Kenyatta were subsequently withdrawn by the prosecution. The trial of William Ruto and Joshua Arap Sang began on 10 September 2013, and ended on 5 April 2016 with the charges being dismissed. During the investigation the ICC prosecutor charged Walter Barasa, Paul Gicheru and Philip Bett with crimes against the administration of justice.

== Background ==
On 27 December 2007, a general election was held in Kenya, comprising parliamentary, presidential and civic elections. The incumbent President, Mwai Kibaki, who represents the Party of National Unity and Raila Odinga from the Orange Democratic Movement were the leading candidates. Early indications showed that Odinga was likely to win the election, however the results announced by the Electoral Commission of Kenya showed that Kibaki had been re-elected and he was sworn in as president. Immediately after the Electoral Commission's announcement, Odinga rejected the result, claiming that widespread electoral fraud had taken place. European Union electoral observers also claimed that the electoral commission had failed to ensure the credibility of the vote.

In the days that followed violence spread throughout the country. An estimated 1,200 people died and more than 500,000 were displaced from their homes. A government spokesman accused Odinga's supporters of "engaging in ethnic cleansing", while Odinga claimed that the President's supporters were "guilty, directly, of genocide". Violence was mainly perpetrated along tribal lines; Mwai Kibaki is part of the Kikuyu tribe, the largest tribe in Kenya, while Odinga is a Luo. Violence continued until a peace deal was agreed upon between Kibaki and Odinga under the mediation of former United Nations Secretary-General Kofi Annan, whereby Kibaki would remain as president and Odinga would take over the newly created office of the prime minister.

As part of the mediation between Kibaki and Odinga in 2008, the two parties agreed on a series of accords. One of these was to establish the Commission of Inquiry into the Post-Election Violence, chaired by Kenyan judge Philip Waki to investigate the violence and particularly the actions of the police. Waki's report recommended that the Kenyan government set up a special tribunal to prosecute those responsible for the worst crimes. and although both Kibaki and Odinga voiced support for a local tribunal, the idea was rejected by the National Assembly. Waki passed his report, including a list of the names of those he considered most responsible for the violence back to Kofi Annan with instructions that it be passed to the International Criminal Court if progress with the local tribunal was not made. On 16 July 2009 the Waki commission delivered a copy of his report along with six boxes of documents and supporting materials to the International Criminal Court along with a sealed envelope containing a list of people who could be implicated in the violence. The prosecutor, Luis Moreno Ocampo opened the envelope, inspected its contents and re-sealed it. Initially the ICC gave the Kenyan government a deadline of July 2010 to establish a local tribunal before it would refer the case to the ICC Prosecutor Luis Moreno Ocampo. The "Waki List" has so far not been made public, and there is speculation that it may contain more names than the six who were initially indicted by the ICC; consequently there have been some calls in Kenya for either the ICC or Waki to release the list.

== Pre-Trial Chamber authorisation ==
The International Criminal Court's prosecutor may open a formal investigation in one of three circumstances: when a situation is referred by the government of a state which the investigation concerns, when the situation is referred by the UN Security Council, or under the prosecutor's own volition with authorisation from a Pre-Trial Chamber. On 6 November 2009 the ICC Presidency assigned the situation in Kenya to Pre-Trial Chamber II and the prosecutor made an application to that chamber for authorisation to open a formal investigation on 26 November. The judges of the pre-trial chamber granted this authorisation on 31 March 2010. The judges who made this decision, Ekaterina Trendafilova, Hans-Peter Kaul and Cuno Tarfusser noted in their written ruling that while Article 15 of the Rome Statute does allow for the Prosecutor to investigate and prosecute a case of his own volition, this is one of the more controversial aspects of the ICC. In the ICC's history, this case was the first time the Prosecutor decided to investigate a case in this manner, with all prior cases being referred to the Court either by a national government, or by the United Nations Security Council.

Judge Hans-Peter Kaul made a dissenting opinion in the judgment, but the judgment was passed by a 2–1 majority. In his dissent he wrote:

In essence, the main reason for this position is the following: both, my interpretation of article 7(2) (a) of the [Rome] Statute, which sets out the legal definition of "attack directed against any civilian population" as constitutive contextual element of crimes against humanity, and my examination of the Prosecutor's Request and supporting material, including the victims' representations, have led me to conclude that the acts which occurred on the territory of the Republic of Kenya do not qualify as crimes against humanity falling under the jurisdictional ambit of the Court.

— Hans-Peter Kaul

== Suspects ==
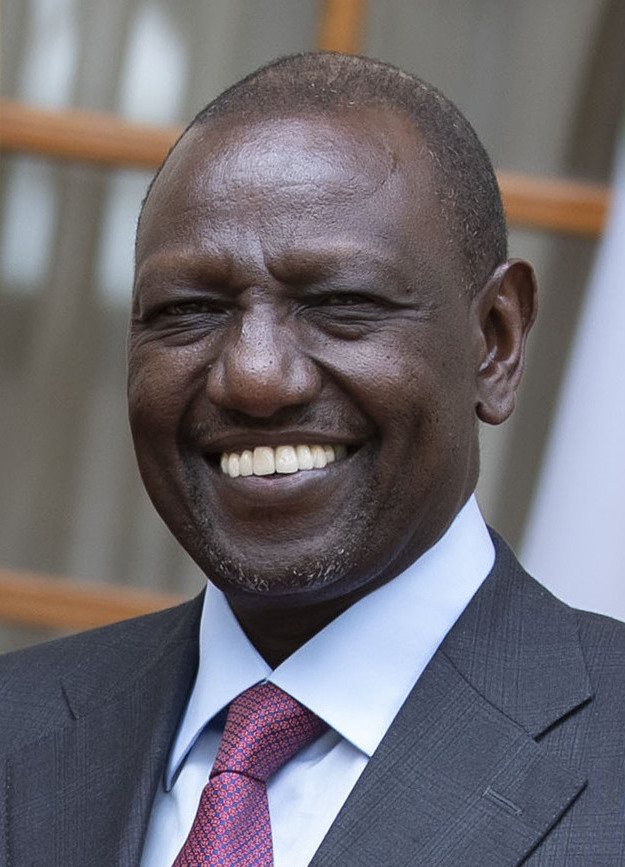
William Ruto, one of the suspects charged with crimes against humanity

On 15 December 2010, Prosecutor Luis Moreno Ocampo named six suspects, and made an application to Pre-Trial Chamber II for summonses to be issued to them. The six men became colloquially known as the Ocampo Six (or Ocampo 6). The individuals named by Moreno Ocampo were:

- Major General Mohammed Hussein Ali – the chief executive of the Postal Corporation of Kenya, who at the time of the post-election violence had been the Commissioner of the Kenya Police.
- Uhuru Muigai Kenyatta – the then Deputy Prime Minister and Minister for Finance, who was also the chairman of the KANU political party, which had supported President Kibaki's Party of National Unity during the involved election.
- Henry Kiprono Kosgey – the then Minister for Industrialisation and member of the National Assembly for the Tinderet Constituency, who was also chairman of the Orange Democratic Movement.
- Francis Kirimi Muthaura – the then Head of Public Service, Cabinet Secretary and chairman of the National Security Advisory Committee.
- William Samoei Ruto – the then Minister for Higher Education, Science and Technology and ODM member of the National Assembly for the Eldoret North Constituency.
- Joshua Arap Sang – the head of operations at the Kalenjin language radio station KASS FM, who at the time of the post-election violence was a radio presenter.

=== Legal representation ===
It was reported in 2011 that Kenyatta has recruited British lawyers Steven Kay and Gillian Higgins, who previously defended Slobodan Milosevic at the International Criminal Tribunal for the former Yugoslavia, to lead his legal team. Francis Muthaura initially appointed another British lawyer, Karim Ahmad Khan, who previously led the defence of Charles Taylor at the Special Court for Sierra Leone, and subsequently also recruited Essa Faal and Shyamala Alagendra who both formerly worked in the ICC Prosecutor's office. Ali's defence was led by Canadian John Philpot, Kosgey's by Julius Kemboi, and William Ruto appointed Dr. Kindiki Kithure and Katwa Kigeni. Kigeni also represented Joshua Sang. The Kenyan government agreed to pay the legal costs of Francis Muthaura and Mohamed Ali due to their actions being taken in the course of their public employment. This decision attracted criticism from many Kenyans.

== Charges ==
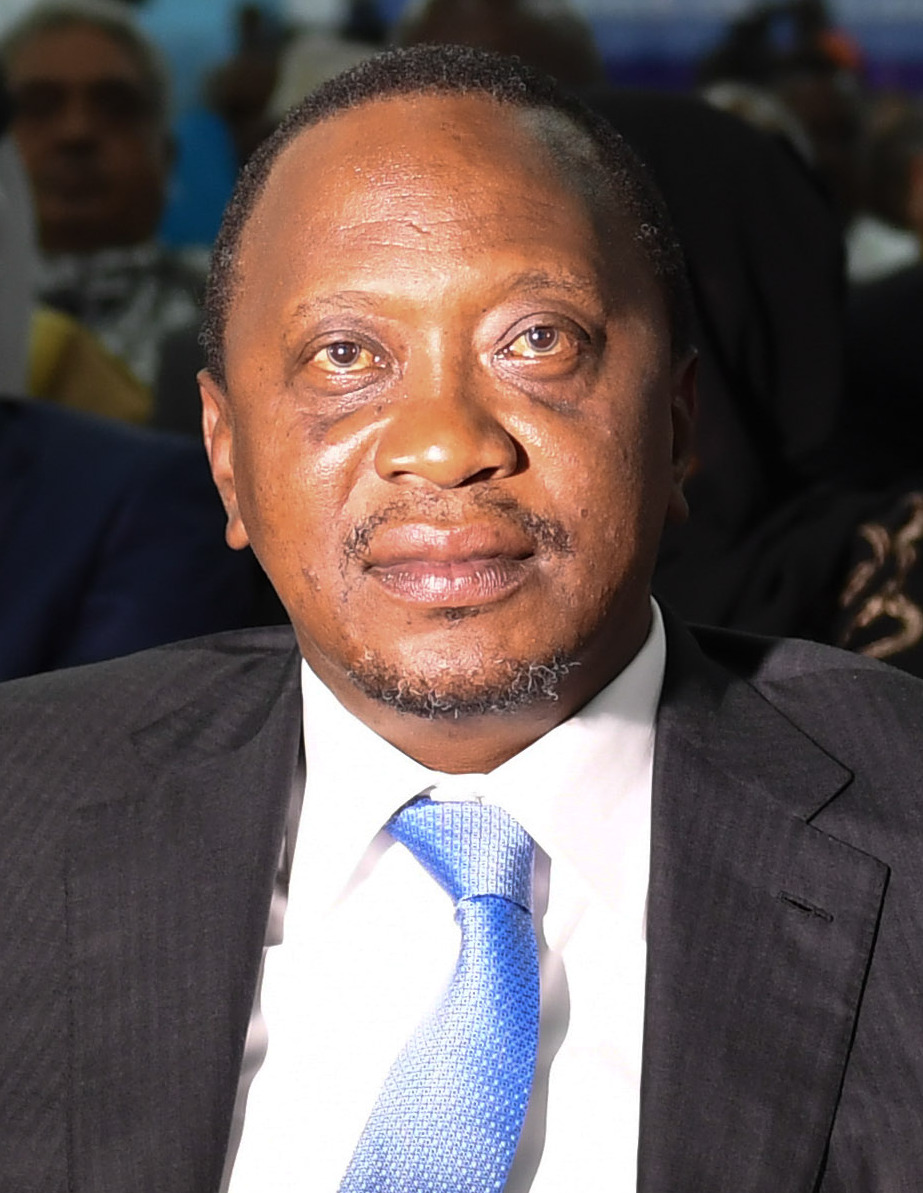
Uhuru Kenyatta

The prosecutor presented the charges to Pre-Trial Chamber II as two separate cases, one case was the prosecution of Ali, Kenyatta, and Mathaura, and the second case is the prosecution of Kosgey, Ruto, and Sang. All six suspects were accused of crimes against humanity.

=== The Prosecutor v. William Samoei Ruto, Henry Kiprono Kosgey and Joshua Arap Sang ===
In the case which concerns the Orange Democratic Movement's supporters' actions against the supporters of the government, William Ruto, Henry Kosgey, and Joshua Sang were charged with four counts of crimes against humanity. They were all accused of committing the crimes as indirect co-perpetrators at locations including Turbo town, the greater Eldoret area, Kapsabet town, and Nandi Hills town. Their charges were:

1. Murder, constituting a crime against humanity in violation of article 7(1)(a) of the Rome Statute;
2. Deportation or forcible transfer of a population, constituting a crime against humanity in violation of article 7(1)(d) of the Rome Statute;
3. Torture, constituting a crime against humanity in violation of article 7(1)(f) of the Rome Statute;
4. Persecution, constituting a crime against humanity in violation of article 7(1)(h) of the Rome Statute;

=== The Prosecutor v. Francis Kirimi Muthaura, Uhuru Muigai Kenyatta and Mohammed Hussein Ali ===
In the case which concerns the government's supporters' actions against the opposition, Francis Muthaura, Uhuru Kenyatta, and Mohammed Ali were charged with five counts of crimes against humanity. They were accused of committing these crimes as indirect co-perpetrators at locations including Kisumu, Kibera, Nakuru and Naivasha:

1. Murder, constituting a crime against humanity in violation of article 7(1)(a) of the Rome Statute;
2. Deportation or forcible transfer of a population, constituting a crime against humanity in violation of article 7(1)(d) of the Rome Statute;
3. Rape and other forms of sexual violence, constituting a crime against humanity in violation of article 7(1)(g) of the Rome Statute;
4. Persecution, constituting a crime against humanity in violation of article 7(1)(h) of the Rome Statute;
5. Inhumane acts, constituting a crime against humanity in violation of article 7(1)(k) of the Rome Statute;

== Pre-trial phase ==
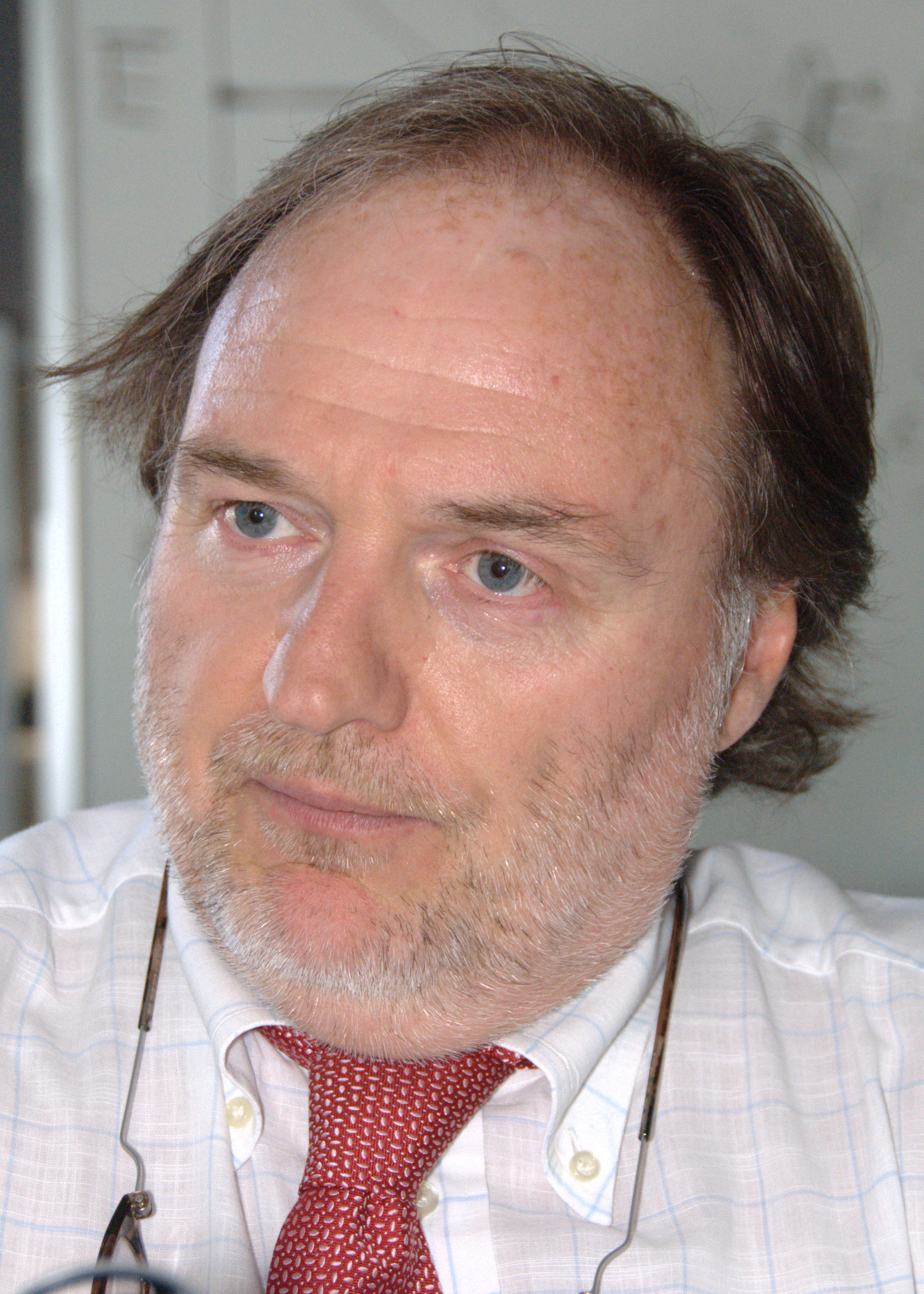
Cuno Tarfusser, one of the judges of Pre-Trial Chamber II

Pre-Trial Chamber II ruled that there were reasonable grounds to believe that William Ruto and Henry Kosgey were criminally responsible as indirect co-perpetrators of the crimes outlined in counts 1, 2 and 4, but in the case of Joshua Sang it ruled that his involvement was not essential to the commission of the crimes and so only ruled that there were grounds to believe he otherwise contributed to the crimes. The Chamber rejected the request by the Prosecutor to include the charge of torture in count 3. In the case of Kenyatta, Muthaura and Ali the Chamber ruled that there were reasonable grounds to believe that Uhuru Kenyatta and Francis Muthaura were guilty as indirect co-perpetrators of the crimes of which they were accused but in the case of Mohammed Ali, the Chamber ruled that his contribution was not essential to the commission of the crimes and so he was charged with having otherwise contributed.

On 8 March 2011, Pre-Trial Chamber II issued summonses to appear for all six of the suspects in the two cases. As with the decision to authorise the investigation by the Prosecutor, Judge Hans-Peter Kaul dissented and opposed the issuance of summonses.

=== Initial hearings ===
On 7 April 2011, the initial hearing took place in the case of Ruto, Kosgey, and Sang, and the following day the corresponding hearing in the case of Kenyatta, Ali, and Mathaura also took place at the seat of the Court in The Hague. During the hearing, presiding Judge Ekaterina Trendafilova expressed concern at some of the actions of the suspects, in particular speeches that may have been made in an attempt to incite further violence in Kenya. Speaking at the initial hearing she said:

It came to the knowledge of the Chamber by way of following some articles in the Kenyan newspapers that there are some movements towards retriggering the violence in the country by way of using some dangerous speeches. I would like to remind the suspects – and I'm not referring to anyone in particular but this is a general point to be made to all the suspects – that such type of action could be perceived as a sort of inducement which may constitute the breach of one of the conditions set out in the summonses to appear, namely, to continue committing crimes within the jurisdiction of the Court. Accordingly, this might prompt the Chamber to replace the summonses to appear with warrants of arrest.

— Ekatrina Trendafilova,

At the initial hearings the chamber set dates for the confirmation of charges hearings to take place in September 2011. An application by the Office of the Prosecutor to impose conditions on the suspects' summonses including that they provide details of all their home addresses and that they pay a bond to the Court was rejected by Judge Trendafilova.

=== Location of confirmation of charges hearings ===
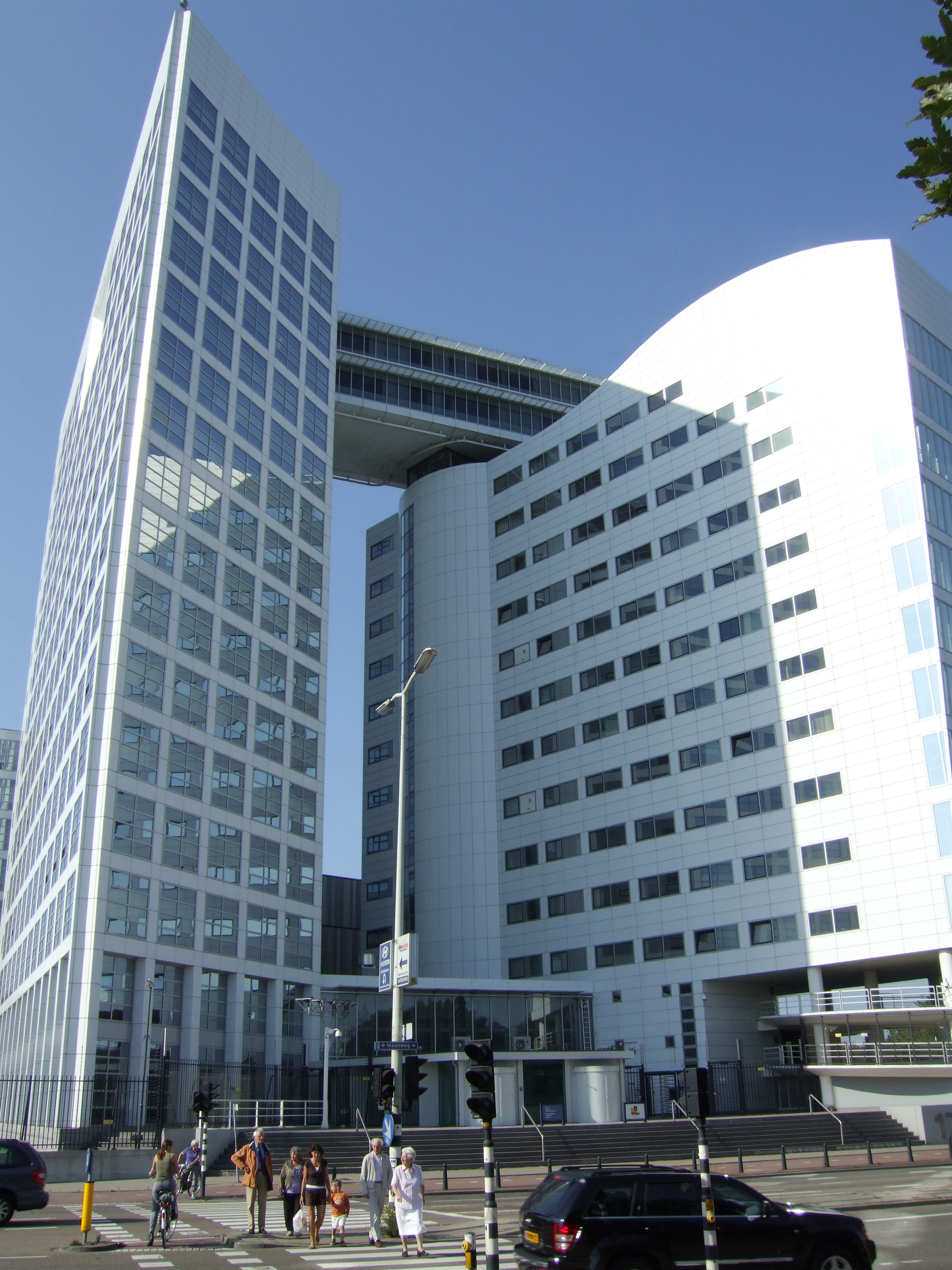
The ICC's temporary headquarters in The Hague where the court sat prior to 2005

In June 2011, Pre-Trial Chamber II requested that the Prosecutor, defendants, and victims comment on the possibility of holding the confirmation of charges hearings in Kenya rather than in The Hague. This move was supported by Amnesty International, which claimed that holding the hearings in Kenya would bring the justice process closer to victims. The idea of holding the hearings in Kenya was also supported by the defendants Francis Muthaura and Henry Kosgey, with Mathaura suggesting holding the hearings in a military barracks for enhanced security as well as suggesting the possibility of holding the hearings in Arusha, Tanzania, which is the location of the International Criminal Tribunal for Rwanda. The move was opposed by the Prosecution, who cited security concerns as an obstacle, and also by Ali, Kenyatta, Ruto, and Sang who cited the possibility that a change of venue would lead to delays in the trial process in submissions made to the Court. On 29 June Judge Trendafilova ruled that the hearings will take place at the seat of the Court in The Hague.

=== Confirmation of charges hearings ===
The hearing in the case of Ruto, Kosgey and Sang took place in The Hague between 1 and 8 September 2011. The three defendants had all filed applications challenging the jurisdiction of the court which were rejected by the chamber. Although the defence teams had initially proposed calling 43 witnesses to the confirmation of charges hearings the chamber instructed them to present just two witnesses each at the confirmation hearings, which they did. Ruto and Sang additionally made unsworn statements in person.

The hearing in the case of Muthaura, Kenyatta and Ali took place between 21 September and 5 October 2011. Kenyatta and Ali submitted challenges to the court's jurisdiction which were rejected. The defence teams presented two witnesses each and Kenyatta made a sworn statement. Francis Muthaura exercised his right to make an unsworn statement.

== Participation of victims ==
The procedures of the ICC allow for the participation of victims who may submit views and observations to the Court and also apply for reparations. In the case of Ruto et al. 394 victims applied to participate in the proceedings and the pre-trial chamber admitted 327 of those victims as participants. In the case of Muthaura et al. 249 victims applied and 233 were admitted as participants.

== The prosecutor's allegations ==
Kenya, shown in green

=== Ruto et al ===
The prosecutor accused the defendants of forming an organisation along with other Kalenjin people as early as 2006 with the stated purpose of removing members of the Kikuyu, Kamba and Kisii ethnic groups from the Rift Valley region of Kenya to create a large pro-ODM power base in that region. To force these communities to relocate, the group planned to inflict fear and destroy homes and property until the victims left the region.

The prosecutor alleged that on 15 April 2007 a ceremony took place at a milk plant in Molo where members of the network swore an oath of allegiance and that further meetings took place, including some which took place at William Ruto's house. In particular the prosecutor claims that a meeting took place on 22 December 2007 at Ruto's house and that guns and money were distributed to the attendees.

Sang, who at the time of the election was the presenter of a radio programme on the Kalenjin language station KASS FM was accused of using his broadcasts to spread instructions and incitements to violence.

==== Murder ====
The charge of murder as a crime against humanity was made by the prosecutor in relation to multiple attacks that took place in the aftermath of the election. The prosecution alleges that members of the network attacked Turbo town on 30 and 31 December 2007, resulting in at least 4 deaths and with one witness claiming that he saw more than 200 dead bodies. Additionally the prosecutor alleges that network members attacked the Huruma, Kiambaa, Kimumu, Langas and Yamumbi areas of Eldoret, resulting in 70 to 87 deaths. It is alleged that during the attack in Kaimbaa several people took refuge in a church which was locked from outside and then burned down causing between 17 and 35 people to be burned to death. Additionally the prosecutor alleges that the towns of Kapsabet and Nandi Hills town were attacked by network members.

==== Forcible Transfer of Population ====
The prosecutor claims that the network forced residents of Turbo, Eldoret, Kapsabet and Nandi Hills to leave these areas by destroying homes and that in Turbo town homes and businesses were burned with petrol. Many residents fled to police stations and at one point 7,500 displaced people were sheltering at Kapsabet police station alone.

==== Persecution ====
The crime of persecution as a crime against humanity is defined under the Rome Statute as "the intentional and severe deprivation of fundamental rights contrary to international law by reason of the identity of the group or collectivity. The prosecutor claims that since the crimes of murder and forcible transfer of population were done against specific ethnic groups which were identified as supporters of the PNU, these crimes amount to persecution.

=== Muthaura et al ===
The prosecutor alleges that Muthaura, Ali, Kenyatta and the leadership of the outlawed Mungiki sect "agreed to pursue an organizational policy to keep the PNU in power through every means necessary, including by orchestrating a police failure to prevent the commission of crimes". He claims that prior to the election Uhuru Kenyatta was the mediator between the PNU and the Mungiki and organised a series of meetings from November 2007 involving Muthaura, other government officials, businessmen and Mungiki leaders. Kenyatta and Muthaura are accused of providing funding, uniforms and weapons to Mungiki and pro-PNU youth to carry out their attacks. Muthaura, as chairman of the National Security Committee, and Ali as commissioner of police are accused of instructing the Kenya Police not to intervene in the attacks.

The prosecutor claims that in preparation for the post-election violence a meeting took place at the State House in Nairobi on 26 November 2007 between Muthaura, Kenyatta, Mungiki representatives and President Kibaki. During this meeting it is alleged by the anonymous "Witness 4", one of the Mungiki representatives present at the meeting that Francis Muthaura gave money to the Mungiki representatives. At a second meeting, held on 30 December Kenyatta is accused of giving some MPs and Mungiki coordinators KSh.3.3 million/= each (approximately US$35,000) with which to buy guns to attack Nakuru. In late January 2008, before the crimes in Naivasha, the Mungiki leader Maina Njenga was allegedly given KSh.20 million/= and that in return for that money and other concessions Njenga placed the Mungiki at the disposal of Muthaura and Kenyatta.

==== Murder ====
The prosecutor alleges that murder as a crime against humanity took place in Nakuru and Naivasha. He alleges that approximately 112 people were killed in Nakuru between 24 and 27 January 2008 and that by 31 January at least 50 people had been killed in Naivasha. One witness testified that 23 people died in Naivasha from burns including 19 who died in a single arson attack on the Kabati estate. The majority of the killings were the result of attacks with machetes and blunt instruments although guns were used in some attacks.

==== Forcible transfer of population ====
The prosecution alleges that thousands of ODM supporters were forced to leave their homes in Nakuru and Naivasha. In particular 9,000 people took refuge at Naivasha police station and in Nakuru many took refuge at the Afraha stadium. It is claimed that public announcements of "Luos must leave" were made in these areas. The people displaced were mainly from the Luo, Luhya and Kalenjin ethnic groups.

==== Rape and other forms of sexual violence ====
The prosecutor alleges that in Nakuru forty five cases of sexual violence were reported including rapes, forced male circumcisions and penile amputation. Rapes were also reported in Naivasha, as were forced circumcisions of Luo men. One witness claims that Naivasha's men were forced to remove their underwear to confirm their ethnicity and forcibly circumcised if their uncircumcised penis identified them as Luo.

==== Persecution and other inhumane acts ====
In relation to the charges of persecution and other inhumane acts the prosecutor cites the physical violence and destruction of property that was committed by the Mungiki members against the ODM supporters as being "other inhumane acts" which constitute crimes against humanity. Since these acts were targeted at people who were believed to support the Orange Democratic Movement or who were part of the Luo, Luhya and Kalenjin ethnic groups the prosecutor further claims that these crimes meet the definition of persecution as a crime against humanity.

== Confirmation of charges ==
The outcomes of the confirmation of charges hearings were announced on 23 January 2012. Despite the ICC regulations requiring the Pre-Trial Chamber to normally issue a verdict on confirmation of charges within sixty days of the hearings taking place, the chamber issued a ruling on 26 October 2011 to vary this time limit to allow both the results in both cases to be announced simultaneously. The chamber ruled by majority (with judge Kaul dissenting) to confirm all of the charges against William Ruto and Joshua Arap Sang, to confirm all of the charges with the exception of "other forms of sexual violence" against Uhuru Kenyatta and Francis Muthaura and to decline to confirm the charges against Mohammed Hussein Ali and Henry Kosgey.

=== Hans-Peter Kaul's dissent ===
Judge Kaul issued a dissenting opinion in both cases. In these opinions he asserted that he continues to believe that the ICC lacks jurisdiction ratione materiae over the situation in Kenya. His assertion was that the although crimes were committed they were not of a nature which constitute crimes against humanity within the jurisdiction of the ICC. This was the third time that Judge Kaul wrote a similar dissent opposing the prosecutions.

== Perverting the course of justice ==
The ICC prosecutor charged Walter Barasa, Paul Gicheru and Philip Bett with perverting the course of justice, as defined under Article 70. Bensouda stated that there were reasonable grounds to believe that Gicheru and Bett had used "an organized and systematic criminal scheme", including bribes, to persuade witnesses to withdraw their statements or refuse to testify. Gicheru testified to the court, but died on the night of 26/27 September 2022 while awaiting the results of the trial. As of 23 February 2023, the cases against Barasa and Bett remained open.

== Effect on the suspects ==
Following the confirmation of charges Orange Democratic Movement legislators petitioned the president to dismiss Kenyatta and Muthaura from their posts. They cited an agreement signed by Kibaki as part of the implementation of the Waki Commission's report in December 2008 which states "The parties shall ensure that any person holding public office or any public servant charged with a criminal offence related to 2008 post-election violence shall be suspended from duty until the matter is fully adjudicated upon". Kenyan Attorney-General Githu Muigai issued a statement that the pair would not be required to vacate office until their appeals against the confirmation are concluded, however Kenyatta and Muthaura both resigned their posts of Finance Minister and Cabinet Secretary respectively on 26 January. Kenyatta will however retain his position of Deputy Prime Minister.

Both Uhuru Kenyatta and William Ruto declared their candidacies for the 2013 Kenyan presidential elections.

== Response within Kenya ==
On 22 December 2010, a week after the ICC Prosecutor announced the individuals he was seeking to prosecute, the Kenyan National Assembly passed a motion seeking to withdraw Kenya as a State Party to the Rome Statute, the treaty which established the International Criminal Court. The motion, which was introduced by Assembly Member Isaac Ruto had previously been thrown out of the National Assembly by Deputy Speaker Farah Maalim who ruled it was unconstitutional; however an amended version was introduced the following day and passed. During the debate, the Minister for Energy Kiraitu Murungi claimed the ICC was a colonialist, imperialist court. This motion did not itself affect Kenya's status as a State Party to the Rome Statute, but rather obliges ministers to move to repeal Kenya's International Crimes Act which ratified the Rome Statute and made necessarily changes to Kenyan's criminal code. In February 2011, Kenya appealed to the United Nations Security Council, asking it to defer the trials at The Hague. Some critics in Kenya have also questioned the constitutionality of the Rome Statute, arguing that it is incompatible with the Constitution of Kenya, which was passed by a referendum in 2010.

The Kenyan government's attempt to defer the cases at the ICC by appealing to members of the UN Security Council failed without being voted on, however the government, represented by British lawyers Geoffrey Nice and Rodney Dixon, have subsequently applied directly to the Court. The Kenyan government's application to Pre-Trial Chamber II that the two cases were inadmissible was rejected unanimously by the judges. Many victims of the post-election violence voiced opposition to the government's stance, and a poll of Kenyans conducted by Synovate shortly after Moreno Ocampo's announcement that he intended to seek summonses showed that sixty percent of Kenyans supported the trial of the accused taking place in The Hague.

== International response ==
Following Moreno Ocampo's initial announcement of his intention to bring prosecutions against the six suspects, the US President Barack Obama called upon Kenya to co-operate with the ICC. In a statement he said:

I urge all of Kenya's leaders, and the people whom they serve, to cooperate fully with the ICC investigation and remain focused on implementation of the reform agenda and the future of your nation. Those found responsible will be held accountable for their crimes as individuals. No community should be singled out for shame or held collectively responsible. Let the accused carry their own burdens – and let us keep in mind that under the ICC process they are innocent until proven guilty. As you move forward, Kenyans can count on the United States as a friend and partner.

— Barack Hussein Obama

The African Union endorsed the position of the Kenyan government in seeking to delay or postpone the ICC proceedings. As of 2011, all of the formal investigations which have been put before the International Criminal Court have concerned African countries, and only African defendants have been indicted. This has led to some resentment within Africa that the Court is targeting Africa unfairly. In particular the African Union has cited this geographical imbalance of ICC investigations in its decisions not to co-operate in the proceedings against Sudanese President Omar al-Bashir and Libyan leader Muammar Gaddafi. The ICC Deputy Prosecutor Fatou Bensouda denied that the ICC or its prosecutors are discriminatory, speaking in Côte d'Ivoire she said:

Anytime I hear this about ICC targeting Africa, ICC doing double justice, it saddens me, especially as an African woman, also knowing that these conflicts, most of these conflicts are happening on the continent of Africa

— Fatou Bensouda
