= Tehran – Haifa – Tel Aviv =

Tehran – Haifa – Tel Aviv, or TeHTel, is a project that connects Iranian and Israeli citizens, and creates new bridges between the cultures.

== Overview ==
The project, launched in March 2012, operates at the Ezri Center for Iran and Persian Gulf Studies at the University of Haifa. TeHTel includes a Persian website, and profiles on international and Persian-language social networks. The project's website received millions of pageviews, its articles are quoted and copied by major Iranian media channels and websites, and Iranian users posted tens of thousands of comments in Persian in response to content published by the project.

The project's staff keep in daily contact with Iranian citizens.

== Project description ==
TeHTel created a network of hundreds of Israeli content partners, including major Israeli media organizations and independent bloggers and photographers. The project's editors pick different articles originally published in Hebrew by the content partners, translate the selected articles to Persian, and publish the translated content in Persian-language websites and social networks.

The translated content serves as a basis for dialogue between Israeli and Iranian citizens, as well as internal Iranian discussions. The project publishes articles in a variety of topics, from everyday life in Israel, through culture and politics, to economics and Middle Eastern issues. According to the University of Haifa, the project is careful to avoid propaganda and public relations articles. Thus, the project deals with sensitive issues, such as tensions in Israel between Sephardi and Ashkenazi Jews, and the cost of living in Israel.

Israeli articles published by TeHTel are frequently copied and quoted by online Iranian media, such as Raja News and YJC, a website affiliated with the conservative Revolutionary Guard Corps. The project's staff regularly communicates with thousands of Iranian citizens. Users speak about their lives and political ideas, and sometimes share intimate details about themselves.

From time to time, the project creates joint Iranian-Israeli activities.

The project also promotes and markets content created by Iranians to Israeli audiences. The project publishes Hebrew translations of articles by Iranian bloggers, including photographic journeys in Iran. In addition, the project publishes Iranian content in Israeli media venues. Through the project, Iranians published articles in prominent Israeli newspapers. In another case, the project's staff translated to Hebrew a video clip shot in Tehran by a local Iranian studio, and helped the clip reach Israeli mainstream audiences.

== Iranian response to TeHTel ==
A month after TeHTels launched, the Iranian senior official Mohsen Rezaee denounced the project. Rezaee is the former commander of the Iranian Revolutionary Guard corps, a candidate in the Iranian presidential elections, and the current secretary of the Expediency Discernment Council. Rezaee claimed that the project is "a new espionage tool of the Israeli regime," adding that "although the project's editors claim that the site is designed to create friendships between the two peoples, it seems that the main purpose is to create a new espionage and intelligence gathering technique against Iran". Following Rezaee, a number of sites associated with high ranking Iranian government officials denounced the project. In response to Rezaee, the project's staff published an open letter, calling for dialogue.

A month after the incident, a group named "the cyber fighters and officers of Kerman Province", a group of Iranian hackers affiliated with conservative elements, published a harsh condemnation of the project. In the same month, the project was attacked by Iranian hackers.

== See also ==
- Israel Loves Iran
