= Kituyi =

Kituyi is a surname. Notable people with the surname include:

- John Kituyi (c.1952–2015), Kenyan editor and publisher
- Mukhisa Kituyi (born 1956), Kenyan politician
