= Israel Loves Iran =

Movement focused on Israeli-Iranian relations

Israel Loves Iran is a public campaign and social media movement that seeks to bring together Israelis and Iranians and promote peace between their two countries.

== History ==
The organization was founded by Israeli graphic designer and the owner of Pushpin Mehina, Ronny Edry, when he first posted a picture of himself and his young daughter to Facebook with a graphic stating "Iranians, we love you, we will never bomb your country." The photo went viral, sparking a campaign which has expanded to include hundreds of thousands of people in many different countries; Israel Loves Iran has inspired many similar campaigns, including Iran Loves Israel.

The movement has seen many Israeli and Iranian citizens meet in third-party countries, often simply to have coffee together and take a picture to promote peace. Israel Loves Iran has included extensive public ad campaigns, including a campaign depicting images of Israelis and Iranians on the sides of buses in Tel Aviv.

In 2012, Ronny Edry spoke about the campaign at TEDxJaffa, and the video of his talk has been viewed more than 1.2 million times on TED.com. In 2013, Ronny Edry and Iran Loves Israel founder Majid Nowrouzi travelled to St. Louis, USA with their families in order to meet, where Edry spoke at Principia College and received the Euphrates Institute’s Visionary of the Year award, and the two were interviewed for public radio.

An online petition by Iranian Roya Mobasheri is pushing for a Nobel Peace Prize nomination for the Israel Loves Iran campaign.

== See also ==
- Tehran - Haifa - Tel Aviv
