= Revolutionary Guard =

Revolutionary Guard may refer to:

- Revolutionary Guard Corps (Libyan paramilitary unit)
- Islamic Revolutionary Guard Corps of Iran

== See also ==
- Republican guard
