= Hasan al-Kabir al-Gaddafi =

Hasan al-Kabir al-Gaddafi, is a cousin of former Libyan ruler Muammar Gaddafi, and was the leader of the Libyan Revolutionary Guard Corps, that protected Gaddafi until his death and the overthrow of his regime in the Libyan Civil War.
