= Ekaterina Trendafilova =

Bulgarian lawyer and judge

President and Judge of the Kosovo Specialist Chambers
- Incumbent
- Assumed office 12 January 2017

Judge of the International Criminal Court
- In office 11 March 2006 – 11 March 2015
- Nominated by: Bulgaria
- Appointed by: Assembly of States Parties
- Preceded by: Tuiloma Neroni Slade

Personal details
- Born: 20 June 1953 (age 72) Sofia, Bulgaria

Ekaterina Trendafilova (Bulgarian: Екатерина Трендафилова; born 20 June 1953) is a Bulgarian lawyer and judge with international and domestic experience. She is currently serving as the first President of the Kosovo Specialist Chambers – a position to which she was appointed in December 2016 for a four-year term and took her office on 12 January 2017.

== Mandate at the International Criminal Court ==
Prior to her appointment to the Kosovo Specialist Chambers, President Trendafilova was elected a Judge of the International Criminal Court with most votes at the first round of elections. During her mandate at the International Criminal Court, she served between 2006 and 2015 as member of Pre-Trial Chambers I, II and III; Presiding Judge of Pre-Trial Chamber II; President of the Pre-Trial Division; ad hoc Judge of the Appeals Division sitting on interlocutory appeals and on the final appeals in the cases of the Prosecutor v. Thomas Lubanga Dyilo (on both judgments – on the merits of the criminal case and on reparations for victims) and the Prosecutor v. Mathieu Ngudjolo Chui. She was assigned to various situations and cases before the Court (Central African Republic, Democratic Republic of the Congo, Darfur, Uganda, Kenya, Mali). She also served as a member of the Advisory Committee on Legal Texts and of the Working Group on Lessons Learned.

== Notable legal opinions and decisions ==
Together with her colleagues of Pre-Trial Chamber II, Judge Trendafilova made the landmark decision that saw President Uhuru Kenyatta, his Deputy William Ruto, former Head of Civil Service Francis Muthaura and journalist Joshua Sang committed to trial in January 2012. As a Single Judge, Trendafilova issued innovative decisions in an attempt to optimise the conduct of pre-trial proceedings, including by devising new streamlined systems for the application and participation in the proceedings of victims of war crimes and crimes against humanity in the Ruto and others case; Muthaura and others case and in the Ntaganda case. Judge Trendafilova addressed for the first time at the International Criminal Court the issue whether members of armed groups engaged in a non-international armed conflict may be held accountable for war crimes, in particular rape and sexual slavery, committed against fellow fighters; and whether the war crime of intentionally attacking civilians may be committed through conduct other than the traditional shelling or bombarding, such as by raping, destruction of civilian properties and pillaging towns and villages in the course of military operations.

In February 2015, sitting in the Appeals Chamber, Judge Trendafilova dissented from the decision to uphold the Trial Chamber’s acquittal of Mathieu Ngudjolo Chui, a militia leader of commanding fighters who destroyed the village of Bogoro in eastern Congo in 2003, raping and hacking to death some 200 people, including children. The original 2012 trial judgment had been only the second verdict in the court's history and the first time it had cleared a suspect. Judge Trendafilova argued that the Appeals Chamber should have ordered a retrial because of errors by the Trial Chamber, saying that vital evidence was disregarded.

== Activities related to legal reform ==
Ekaterina Trendafilova is active in the field of legal reform. In 2016, she consulted the Parliament of Kazakhstan on possible reforms of the Kazakh criminal justice system in light of the contemporary trends in the field. Between 2004 and 2006, she was appointed expert of the European Commission CARDS Regional Project “Establishment of an Independent, Reliable and Functioning Judiciary and Enhancing the Judicial Co-Operation in the Western Balkans”, which involved field missions to Croatia, Montenegro, Albania, Macedonia with a view to formulating recommendations for judicial reforms. She was an expert with the PHARE Twinning project (Bulgaria–Austria) on the “Execution of the Reform Strategy of the Judiciary in Bulgaria. Access to Justice”.

Trendafilova contributed to the legal reform in Bulgaria. In 1998–1999 she was the head of the working group on the reform of the Bulgarian Criminal Procedure Code in line with European and international standards for efficient administration of justice and an effective protection of human rights. She chaired the Criminal Division of the Legislative Consultative Council with the President of the Bulgarian Parliament. Within the purview of the criminal justice reform, Trendafilova was invited to the International Visitor Leadership Program (Criminal Justice Issues), hosted by the US Department of State with working visits to judicial and law enforcement institutions in Washington, New York, Salt Lake City, Denver, San Diego.

== Education and domestic experience ==
Trendafilova completed her PhD in 1984. She was granted a Humboldt (1993–1994) and a Fulbright scholarship (1997).

She was a deputy district attorney at the Sofia District Court (1985–1989) as well as a barrister with the Sofia bar (1995–2006). Trendafilova was the representative of Bulgaria with the UN Commission for Crime Prevention and Criminal Justice (1992–1994).

In 2001, Trendafilova was appointed Professor in Criminal Justice at the Faculty of Law, Sofia University “St Kliment Ohridski”. She also lectured at “St. Cyril and Methodius”, Veliko Tarnovo, Bulgaria. She made presentations on different topics in the field of criminal law and procedure, international criminal law and criminal justice, human rights, humanitarian law and related legal fields in Japan, USA, Colombia, Switzerland, Italy, France, Germany.

Ekaterina Trendafilova is a member of a number of legal associations, including the Editorial Board of Criminal Law Forum and Human Rights Review, the Women with International Societal Expertise, the Bulgarian Fulbright Society, the Bulgarian Alexander von Humboldt Society, the European Correspondents Scientific Committee of the Central International Constats et Perspectives, the Union of Bulgarian Lawyers and was President of the Legal Section of the Union of Bulgarian Scholars.

== Publications ==
Ekaterina Trendafilova is widely published in the field of international and comparative criminal justice, criminal procedure and human rights. She published in Bulgaria and abroad, notably in the USA, France, Italy, Spain, The Netherlands, Brazil, Germany and South Africa on standards applicable to transitional justice, including fairness and expeditiousness of the proceedings, criminal procedure, the relationship between the International Criminal Court and African countries and the incorporation of human rights law into the criminal justice system.

In 2000, Trendafilova was awarded the “Author of the Year” award for contribution to the legal literature with the monographic paper “The Amendments to the Criminal Procedure Code from 1999: Theoretical Grounds, Legislative Decisions, Tendencies”.

== Other awards and honours ==
In 2006 Trendafilova received the Highest Award of the Union of Bulgarian Lawyers and the Award-recognition of the Legal Initiative for Training and Development acknowledging her contribution to the legal reform and education of judges and prosecutors.

In 2008, she received the “Special Merits and Contribution” award from the Bulgarian Ministry of Justice, in recognition of her outstanding contribution to Justice and the Rule of Law in the Republic of Bulgaria.

In 2014 Trendafilova was awarded the Golden Badge of Honour of the Ministry of Foreign Affairs for the promotion of the prestige of the Republic of Bulgaria in the administration of International Justice.
