= Paul Gicheru =

Kenyan lawyer (1972–2022)

Paul Gicheru Njoroge
- Born: 28 November 1972; Nandi District, Kenya
- Died: 26 September 2022 (aged 49); Karen, Nairobi, Kenya
- Citizenship: Kenya
- Education: University of Nairobi; Bachelor of Law; Kenya School of Law; Post Graduate Diploma
- Occupation: Lawyer
- Known for: International Criminal Court case

Paul Gicheru Njoroge (28 November 1972 – 26 September 2022) was a Kenyan lawyer and qualified advocate of the High Court of Kenya who was accused by the International Criminal Court (ICC) of bribing and intimidating witnesses in a case against the now Kenyan President William Ruto, and journalist Joshua Sang that was dismissed in 2016. He faced charges of bribery and corruptly inducing witnesses to interfere with justice. He died while awaiting a decision in the case.

== Early life and career ==
Gicheru was born on 28 November 1972 in Nandi District, Kenya. He was schooled at Kapsabet Boys between 1987 and 1990 before proceeding to the University of Nairobi to pursue a Bachelor of Law degree. He held a postgraduate diploma from Kenya School of Law.

Gicheru began his career at Kalya and Company Advocates in Eldoret before proceeding to open his own - Gicheru and Company Advocates in the same town. In 2014 he was appointed by the head of Kenya's National Treasury, Henry Rotich, to head the Public Procurement Review Board for two years.

== International Criminal Court case ==
In March 2010, the International Criminal Court (ICC)'s Pre-trial chamber II opened an investigation into the political violence that occurred in Kenya after the 2007 Kenyan general election. A letter of arrest for Gicheru and Philip Kipkoech Bett was issued five years later on 10 March 2015 and unsealed on 10 September 2015.

Gicheru surrendered to the ICC five years later on 2 November 2020 to the Netherlands authorities to answer to the alleged charges of corruptly influencing witnesses of the court. His initial appearance was on 6 November 2020.

On 11 December 2020 the pre-trial chamber severed the cases against Gicheru and Philip Kipkoech Bett. On 1 February 2021 Gicheru was released to Kenya with specific conditions restricting liberty. On 15 July 2021, ICC pre-trial Chamber A confirmed the charges of offenses.

The opening of the trial was on 15 February 2022 before single judge Miatta Maria Samba. He pleaded not guilty to the charges and the closing statements to the case were made on 27 June 2022.

== Death ==
Gicheru died at his house in Karen, Nairobi, on 26 September 2022. He was awaiting a decision from the chamber on whether he was responsible for the scheme to interfere with the ICC case, or not. His lawyer suspected foul play and asked for an investigation. He was buried on 6 October 2022 at his family farm in Kwa Nguku, Bahati sub-county in Nakuru County.
