= John Kituyi =

Kenyan newspaper editor and publisher (c. 1952–2015)

- Born: ca. 1952
- Died: April 30, 2015; Eldoret, Kenya
- Cause of death: Murder by bludgeoning
- Resting place: Naitiri, Bungoma County, Kenya
- Occupations: Journalist, editor and publisher
- Years active: 25 years
- Employer(s): Mirror Weekly and The Standard
- Known for: Investigative reporting
- Spouse: Esther Kituyi
- Children: Daughters Sarah and Angela Kituyi
- Relatives: Henry Kituyi

John Kituyi (c. 1952 – 30 April 2015) was a Kenyan editor and publisher for the newspaper Mirror Weekly who lived in Eldoret, Rift Valley Province, Kenya. Kituyi was known for writing and publishing investigative journalism about Kenyan politics. Kituyi was murdered by unknown assailants.

== Personal ==
John Kituyi, 63, was married to Esther Kituyi, and the couple had seven children. Kituyi resided in the western part of Eldoret, Kenya, in Pioneer Estates, and he also had a rural home in Naitiri, Bungoma County.

== Career ==
In the early stages of his career, John Kituyi worked as a journalist for The Standard, a daily newspaper in Eldoret, Kenya in the late 1980s, where he was at one point a bureau chief. After working at The Standard for more than ten years, Kituyi left in 1995 to establish the weekly newspaper, The Mirror Weekly, based out of Eldoret. Kituyi worked as the editor and publisher of this weekly newspaper while also writing some of his own articles. The Mirror Weekly is known for reporting local issues while also featuring controversial national matters. As a journalist, Kituyi's articles mainly focused on investigative reporting and the politics of local and national government.

== Death ==
Eldoret is illustrated within Kenya relative to the capital Nairobi.

A report by the Committee to Protect Journalists raised a possible connection that Kituyi's murdered was the result of an article he both wrote and published in The Daily Nation ("Now ICC plot to jail Ruto") about a case before the International Criminal Court involving Deputy President William Ruto and former radio journalist Joshua Sang. At the time of his death, Kituyi was investigating the disappearance of court witness, Meshack Yebei.

Two assailants on motorcycles attacked John Kituyi while he was returning home by foot after work at around 7:30 p.m. on 30 April 2015. Kituyi had first stopped at the Country Lodge Club and at the time of his attack, he was walking the short distance between the club and his home. The attackers repeatedly hit Kituyi with blunt objects and then stole his mobile phone but they did not rob him of his valuables. After the attack, witnesses found Kituyi on the street in a pool of blood and called for help. He was first taken to Eldoret's Reale Hospital, which rejected him because its facility was over occupied, and then he was moved to Eldoret Hospital, where he was pronounced dead on arrival, and he was finally identified at the Moi Teaching and Referral Hospital. Kituyi had a severe back injury and multiple bruises across his body. Kituyi was laid to rest on 16 May 2015 in Naitiri, Bungoma County, Kenya.

There were two guards who were questioned shortly after the murder. More progress in the case was made in July when a man with the Kenyan Defense Forces had possession of Kituyi's sim card and was charged with robbery and pleaded innocent.

== Context ==
In Kenya, violence targeting journalists has increased, according to the Committee to Protect Journalists. Journalists are currently uncertain because of the conflict between Kenya's Constitution, which was adopted in 2010 and grants press freedom, and laws created under President Uhuru Kenyatta that impose restrictions. Since January 2015, there have been 19 reports from journalists stating that they have been threatened or attacked; all but three of these cases involved public officials of Kenya. Cases like this in Kenya are rarely prosecuted.

== Reactions ==
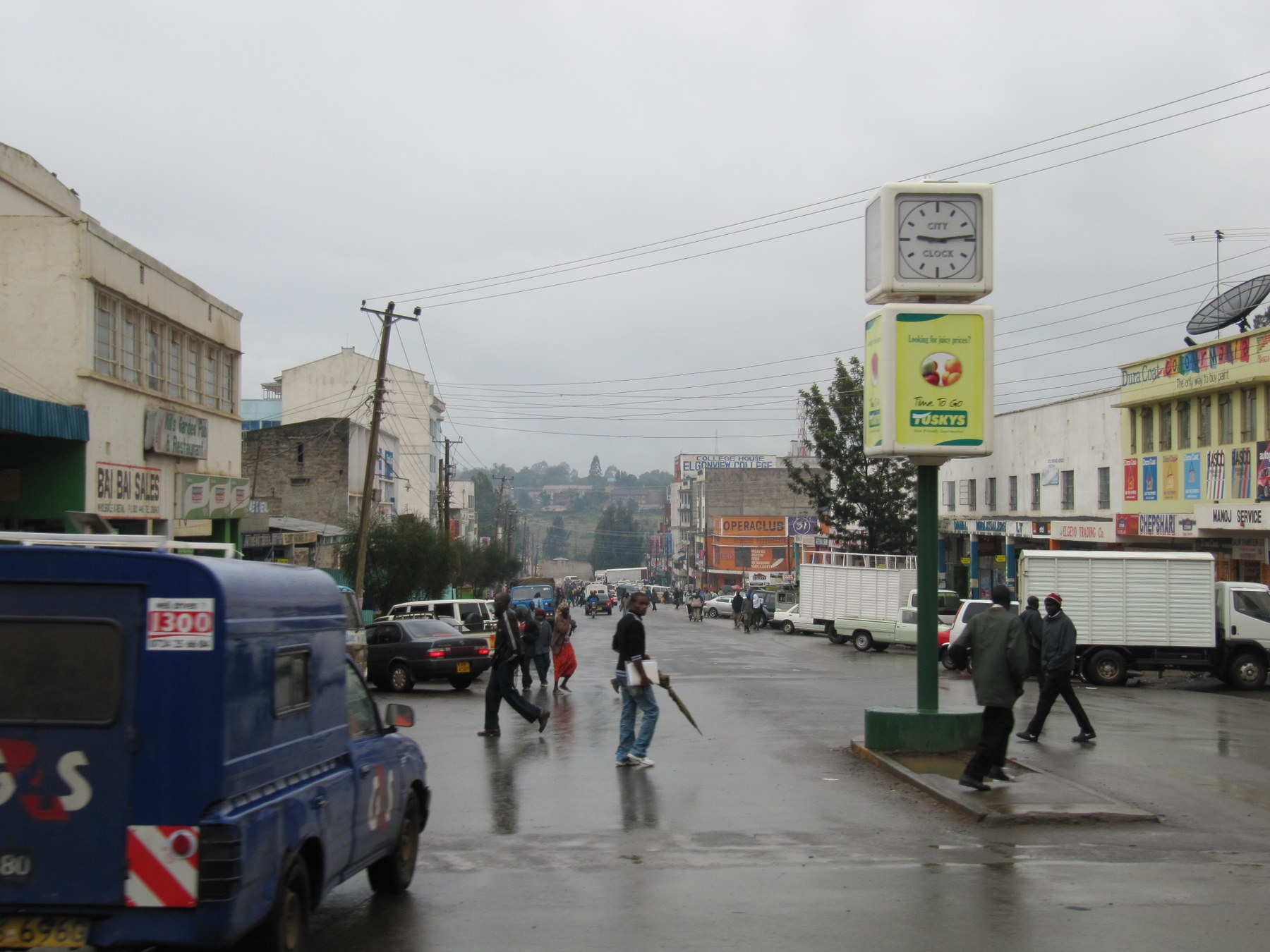
Street scene in Eldoret, Kenya.

John Kituyi was the founder, publisher, and editor of The Mirror Weekly in Eldoret, Kenya. The Mirror Weekly was known for publishing articles about politics of Western Kenya and its investigative reporting. Kituyi's murder while investigating a missing witness in Kenyan Deputy President William Ruto's ICC case, has increased uncertainty about safety and press rights in the country.

Irina Bokova, director-general of the UNESCO, condemned the death of John Kituyi and urged Kenyan authorities to launch an investigation.

Kituyi's family and colleagues also called for an investigation.

Henry Maina, Eastern Africa regional director for Article 19 said, "Kituyi's murder is an assault on press freedom and part of a sustained pattern of intimidating and harassing journalists, while nothing is done to the perpetrators even if they are known." He refers to the many journalists across Africa who are being harassed, kidnapped, and/or murdered.

== See also ==
- Human rights in Kenya
- List of unsolved murders (2000–present)
