= Revolutionary Guard Corps (Libyan paramilitary unit) =

Libyan paramilitary unit

- Liwa Haris al-Jamahiriya
- Active: 1980s–2011
- Allegiance: Libya
- Branch: Paramilitary
- Size: 4,000
- Mottos: "الله، مُعمّر، ليبيا و بس" (God, Muammar, and Libya only)
- Colors: Green
- Equipment: T-55 T-62 SA-8 ZSU-23-4 FN P90 AK-103 FN FAL FN F2000
- Engagements: Toyota War; First Libyan Civil War

Insignia
- Identification mark

In Libya under Muammar Gaddafi, the Revolutionary Guard Corps (also known as the Jamahiriyyah Guard) was a paramilitary unit that played the role of key protection force of the regime of Muammar Gaddafi, until his death in October 2011. Composed of 4,000 men hand-picked from Gaddafi's tribal group in the Sirte region, the Guard was well armed, being provided with T-54 and T-62 tanks, APCs, MRLs, SA-8 SAMs and ZSU-23-4 anti-aircraft guns taken from the army inventory. As of 2005, its commander was Hasan al-Kabir al-Gaddafi, a cousin of the former Libyan leader.

== History ==
The Revolutionary Guard developed from the Revolutionary Committees, even if the latter had at first been introduced only into workplaces and communities, and not extended to the Libyan Armed Forces. After the early 1980s, however, the Revolutionary Guard, as a paramilitary wing of the Revolutionary Committees, became entrenched within the military. They served as a parallel channel of control, a means of ideological indoctrination in the barracks, and an apparatus for monitoring suspicious behavior. The Revolutionary Guards reportedly held the keys to ammunition stockpiles at the main military bases, doling it out in small quantities as needed by the regular forces. Their influence increased after a coup attempt in May 1985, which was blocked mainly thanks to the action of the Revolutionary Guard that engaged regular Army units in a series of street battles in Tripoli.

== See also ==
- Islamic Legion
