= Joshua Sang =

Kenyan journalist

Joshua Arap Sang
- Born: Kitale, Trans-Nzoia District, Kenya
- Occupation: Radio executive
- Known for: ICC trial regarding the 2007–2008 Kenyan crisis

Joshua Arap Sang, born in Kitale, Trans-Nzoia District, Kenya, is the current head of Radio Emoo FM and acting head of radio stations at Mediamax Ltd. in Nairobi, Kenya.

== ICC Case ==
On 8 March 2011, he was indicted by the International Criminal Court for five charges of crimes against humanity committed during the 2007–2008 Kenyan crisis. He was alleged to have committed these crimes against PNU supporters.

An ICC Pre-Trial Chamber summoned him to appear before the court on 7 April 2011, together with William Ruto and Henry Kiprono Kosgey. The ICC charges against Ruto and Sang were dropped in April 2016.

== See also ==
- John Kituyi
