= 2009 in Kenya =

- Decades: 1980s; 1990s; 2000s; 2010s; 2020s
- See also: Other events of 2009; Timeline of Kenyan history

A list of happenings in 2009 in Kenya:

== Incumbents ==
- President: Mwai Kibaki
- Vice-President: Kalonzo Musyoka
- Chief Justice: Johnson Gicheru

== Events ==
=== January ===
- January - Two corruption cases, the 2009 Triton Oil Scandal and the 2009 Kenyan Maize Scandal broke out.
- January 16 - Kenya makes an international food appeal due to drought-induced famine in certain parts of the country
- January 23 - Amos Kimunya is appointed the Minister of Trade. Kimunya resigned from the post of Minister of Finance in July 2008 due to Grand Regency Scandal. Former minister of Trade Uhuru Kenyatta is now appointed for the vacant position of Minister of Finance.
- January 28 - A Nakumatt supermarket in the Nairobi CBD was destroyed by a fire (main article: 2009 Nakumatt supermarket fire).
- January 31 - An oil spill ignition kills over 50 people in near Molo town (main article: 2009 Kenyan oil spill ignition).

=== February ===
- February 19 - Kenyan fishermen are forced to flee the disputed Migingo Island in Lake Victoria after Uganda deploy troops on the island
- February 25 - An UN report recommends dismissing the Attorney General Amos Wako and police commissioner Mohammed Hussein Ali due to killings by the police (The report). On September 8, 2009, Mohammed Hussein Ali was transferred to the position of the Chief Executive of Postal Corporation of Kenya. The new Police Commissioner is Mathew Iteere, the former General Service Unit Commandant.

=== March ===
- March 30 - Student riots at the Kenyatta University results in one fatality and destroyed property, including a computer laboratory.

=== April ===
- April 6 - Kenyan minister of Justice Martha Karua resigns citing lack of progress with her reform agenda.
- April 20 - Over 20 people die at a clash between the mungiki sect and local residents in Karatina (Main article: Mathira Massacre).
- April 24 - Eliud Wabukala is elected the new archbishop of the Anglican Church of Kenya, replacing the outgoing Benjamin Nzimbi

=== May ===
- May 1 - A government official was forced to cut short his speech and abandon the May Day rally as angry workers hurled stones at dignitaries in protest over the government's refusal to deal with difficult living conditions
- May 7 - Thomas Cholmondeley was found guilty of manslaughter

=== June ===
- June 12 - The Othaya Police Chief, John Nzau was shot dead. Fellow policemen were arrested as suspects.
- June 16 - An oil tanker fire kills at least four and injures nearly 50 people at Kapokyek village near Kericho. The victims were siphoning fuel from the tanker that had fallen off the road.

=== July ===
- July 9 - the UN Secretary general Kofi Annan handed names of the main suspects of the 2007 Post-election violence to the International Criminal Court.
- July 21 - A collision of two buses in Siapei along the Narok - Mau Mahiu road causes 22 fatalities
- July 23 - The SEACOM cable becomes operational, raising hopes of higher speed and lower cost internet connections in Kenya.
- July 30 - Kenyan cabinet announced that no special tribunal will be formed to handle the 2009 post-election crisis, and that the cases will be dealt in local courts instead

=== August ===
- August 1 - A small airplane belonging to AIM-Air crashes into a flat in Nairobi's Highrise estate, while approaching the Wilson Airport, resulting in one fatality
- August 4–6- The 8th African Growth and Opportunity Act (AGOA) conference was held at the Kenyatta International Conference Centre in Nairobi. Hillary Clinton, the United States Secretary of State, was among the speakers.
- August 23 - A bus and a truck collide near Gilgil, resulting in 16 deaths
- August 24 - The Kenyan census in 2009 is initiated
- August 24- Long-distance buses and matatus are banned for entering the Nairobi CBD, in order to reduce traffic congestions
- August 27 - Parliamentary by-elections were held in the constituencies of Shinyalu and Bomachoge. ODM retained the Shinyalu seat, the new MP is Justus Kizito, replacing the deceased Charles Lugano. In Bomachoge, Simon Ogari of ODM narrowly beat the 2007 winner Joel Onyancha of PNU. The Bomachoge seat was vacated after the 2007 Elections at the constituency were nullified due to irregularities. For the first time in Kenya, the ballot boxes were transparent.

=== September ===
- September 30 - Aaron Ringera resigns from the position of the director of the Kenya Anti-Corruption Commission (KACC) due to pressure. He had been reappointed as the director of KACC on 31 August 2009, sparking mixed reactions

=== October ===
- October 4 - Fourteen people die when a matatu and a truck collided in Kericho
- October 20 - A building collapsed in Kiambu, killing several people
- October 27 - Mungiki chairman Maina Njenga was acquitted after murder charges on him were withdrawn for lack of evidence

=== November ===
- November 5 - Mungiki spokesman David Gitau Njuguna was shot dead in Nairobi by unknown assailants.
- November 9 - A light cargo plane crashes at the Wilson Airport, killing two crew members. The plane was carrying miraa to Somalia (main article: 2009 Kenyan Beach 1990D crash)
- November 15 - Ten people died when Samburu cattle raiders attacked the Kisima village in Samburu County.
- November 16 - The Kenyan government started to evict settlers from the Mau Forest
- November 17 - The Harmonized Draft Constitution of Kenya was released for public (The Draft)
- November 22 - Six people die when a trailer hit a matatu along the Nakuru-Eldoret Highway in Kiptenden, near Nakuru

=== December ===
- December 2 - Eleven people died as a bus and a lorry collided along the Nakuru–Eldoret highway at Mlango Tatu, Koibatek District
- December 17 - The High court declares the South Mugirango Constituency parliamentary seat held by James Magara vacant due to irregularities in the election,

== Deaths ==
=== January–March ===
- January 1 - Kenyan al-Qaeda members Fahid Mohammed Ally Msalam and Sheikh Ahmed Salim Swedan were killed in a US airstrike in Pakistan.
- January 26 - Pamela Mboya, former UN-HABITAT Kenya representative and widow of Tom Mboya
- January 28 - Angel Wainaina, Actress and radio presenter, known for her role as Sergeant Maria of Cobra Squad TV-series, victim of the Nakumatt supermarket fire.
- January 28 - Peter Serry, the CEO of Tusker FC, victim of the Nakumatt supermarket fire.
- February 1 - Kadir Farah, former international football player died of illness.
- February 25 - Atieno Odhiambo, 63, scholar and writer, died of illness.
- March 5 - Oscar Kamau Kingara and John Paul Oulo, human rights activists, were shot dead by the police.

=== April–June ===
- April 9 - Farakh Yusuf, 54, rally co-driver.
- April 13 - James Bett, a peacemaker dies following a car accident
- May 1–3 - Bantu Mwaura, 40, human-rights activist, actor, director, poet and storyteller who wrote poetry in English, Swahili and Gikuyu
- May 4 - Charles Lugano, 59, Kenyan politician, illness
- June 18 - Professor Peter Kenya from Kenyatta University was shot dead by gangsters

=== July–September ===
- July 9 - Kinuthia Murugu, Youth and Sports Permanent secretary dies of gunshot wounds
- August 11 - Campbell R. Bridges, 71, Scottish born Kenyan resident gemologist, stabbed to death near Voi
- August 13 - Major General Simeon Mutai, former Kenya Air Force commander, illness
- August 14 - Kimani Maruge, ~89, World oldest pupil, stomach cancer

=== October–December ===
- October 9 - Francis Baldacchino, 72, the first Bishop of Malindi, dies of liver and heart complications in Malta.
- October 26 - Patrick Ndururi, 40, runner
- November 2 - Kirugumi wa Wanjuki, 86, the hangman at Kamiti Maximum Security Prison dies of pneumonia.
- November 28 - Patrick Konchellah, 41, runner, Commonwealth Games gold medalist dies of illness
- December 4 - Ronald Kiluta, former MP and assistant minister from Masinga Constituency, road accident

== Sports ==
=== January–March ===
- January 13 - Kenya national football team lost to Uganda in the 2008 CECAFA Cup final. However, Kenya's head coach Francis Kimanzi was sacked soon after the tournament. He was replaced by Antoine Hey from Germany in February 2009.
- January 23 - Olympic champions Pamela Jelimo and Samuel Wanjiru take top honours at the 2008 Kenyan Sports Personality of the Year awards.
- February 9–10 - Kenyan national rugby sevens team reaches main cup semifinal at the 2009 Wellington Sevens and plate final of the 2009 USA Sevens.
- March 5–7 - Kenya reaches the 2009 Rugby World Cup Sevens semi-final in Dubai.
- March 27 - Kenya lost to Tunisia 1-2 at the 2010 FIFA World Cup qualifiers
- March 28 - Kenya reaches the main cup semi-final at the 2009 Hong Kong Sevens.
- March 29 - Micah Kogo breaks the 10 Kilometres road running world record at Parelloop race in Brunssum, The Netherlands by timing 27:01 minutes.

=== April–June ===
- April 3–5 - At the 2009 Adelaide Sevens Kenya reaches its first ever World Sevens Series main cup final, but is defeated by South Africa in the final 7-26. At the group stage, Kenya had beaten South Africa.
- April 3–5 - Carl Tundo wins the 2009 Safari Rally. It was his second Safari title, the previous victory was in 2004.
- April 5 - Duncan Kibet wins the 2009 Rotterdam Marathon, his time 2.04:27 hours makes him the 2nd fastest marathon runner ever after the world record holder Haile Gebrselassie. James Kwambai finished second and posted the same time as Kibet. Abel Kirui was 3rd, his time 2:05:04 is also one of the fastest ever. On the same day, Vincent Kipruto of Kenya won the Paris Marathon setting a new course record on 2.05:47.
- April 9 - Josephine Owino was drafted to Washington Mystics at the 2009 WNBA draft 3rd round.
- April 20 - Kenya qualifies for the 2011 Cricket World Cup by finishing fourth at the 2009 ICC World Cup Qualifier in South Africa.
- April 19 - Gary Boyd of England wins the 2009 Kenya Open golf tournament.
- April 20 - Salina Kosgei wins the 2009 Boston Marathon.
- April 26 - Samuel Wanjiru won the 2009 London Marathon, setting a course record of 2:05:10 hours
- April 21-May 3 - Kenya finishes fourth at the 2009 IRB Junior World Rugby Trophy held in Nairobi. The tournament was won by Romania.
- June 6 - Kenya lost to Nigeria 0-3 in Abuja in a 2010 World Cup Qualifier.
- June 20 - Kenya won Mozambique 2-1 in Nairobi in a 2010 World Cup Qualifier.
- June 21 - Kenya wins the 2009 Safari Sevens.

=== July–September ===
- July 1–12 - Kenya achieved three medals (medal record 1-1-1) at the 2009 Summer Universiade. All medals were won by swimmer Jason Dunford.
- July 8–12 - Kenya topped the medal table at the 2009 World Youth Championships in Athletics (medal record 6-7-1).
- July 12 - Kenya women's national volleyball team qualifies for the 2010 FIVB Women's World Championship at a qualifying tournament held in Nairobi.
- August 15–23 - Kenya finished with the third best medal record at the 2009 World Championships in Athletics with four gold, five silver and three bronze medals. Kenyan gold medalist were Linet Masai (10,000m women), Ezekiel Kemboi (3000m steeplechase men), Vivian Cheruiyot (5000m women) and Abel Kirui (marathon men).
- September 4 - Kenya set a new world record in the 4 x 1500 metres relay, 14:36.23 minutes at the Memorial Van Damme meeting in Brussels. Members of the team were Augustine Choge, William Biwott Tanui, Gideon Gathimba and Geoffrey Rono. The previous record in this rarely competed event was set by West Germany in 1977, making it the oldest world record when it was broken.
- September 6 - Kenya lost to Mozambique 1-0 in Maputo in a 2010 World Cup Qualifier.
- September 26 - Impala RFC becomes the 2009 Kenyan rugby union champion by winning the Kenya Cup

=== October–December ===
- October 4 - Carl Tundo wins the 2009 Kenya National Rally Championship
- October 11- Samuel Wanjiru wins the 2009 Chicago Marathon, setting the fastest marathon time ever run in the United States (2:05:41 hours). On the same day, Mary Keitany won the 2009 IAAF World Half Marathon Championships in Birmingham, while Philes Ongori secured 1-2 for Kenya. Bernard Kipyego took silver in the Men's race behind Zersenay Tadese of Eritrea. Kenya won both team competitions.
- October 18 - Debutant Gilbert Yegon wins the 2009 Amsterdam Marathon, timing 2:06:18 hours, beating the old course record set by Haile Gebrselassie in 2005
- October 20 - AFC Leopards wins the Kenyan Cup, beating a lower division side Congo United 4-1 in the final.
- October 25 - Moses Kipkosgei Kigen and Irene Jerotich win the 2009 Nairobi Marathon, both setting course records
- November 7 - Sofapaka wins the Kenya Premier League in 2009, despite playing in the league for the first time
- November 14 - Kenya lost Nigeria 2-3 in Nairobi in their last game of the 2010 FIFA World Cup qualifiers. Kenya finished the last in their group
- December 2 - Ian Duncan won the 2009 classic rally edition of the Safari Rally

== Entertainment ==
- October 10 - The MTV Africa Music Awards 2009 were held in Nairobi.
