= 2008 in Kenya =

- Decades: 1980s; 1990s; 2000s; 2010s; 2020s
- See also: Other events of 2008; Timeline of Kenyan history

The following lists events that happened during 2008 in Kenya.

== Incumbents ==
- President: Mwai Kibaki
- Vice-president: Moody Awori (until 9 January), Kalonzo Musyoka (starting 9 January)
- Chief Justice: Johnson Gicheru

== Events ==
=== January ===
- January 1 - Riots in Kenya escalated following the tension after disputed presidential elections. On January 1, 2008, a mob attacked and set fire to a church in the town of Eldoret, where hundreds of people had taken refuge. As a result, at least 30 people, mostly Kikuyus, were burned to death.
- January 24 - President Mwai Kibaki and his rival Raila Odinga met for the first time since the elections. Kofi Annan, former United Nations Secretary-General was also present.

=== April ===
- April 13 - The new coalition cabinet is finally unveiled.

=== June ===
- June 10 - Four people, including politicians Kipkalya Kones and Lorna Laboso were killed in an aviation accident. They were on board of a Cessna 210 plane that crashed, without survivors.
- June 11 - The first parliamentary by-elections in Kenya after the chaotic 2007 general elections were held. Out of five seats contested, ODM won three and PNU two. However, ODM lost the Embakasi Constituency seat to PNU.

=== July ===
- July 8 - Amos Kimunya resigns from his post of Minister of Finance due to the Grand Regency Scandal.
- July 15 - Prime minister Raila Odinga issued an order for "illegal" settlers of Mau Forest to be evicted.
- July 31 - Cattle raiders shot around 30 herdsmen at Suguta Valley. The herdsmen were chasing raiders, who had earlier stolen their cattle, but the herdsmen ran out of ammunition.

=== August ===
- August 11 - The results of Kamukunji Constituency of the 2007 parliamentary elections were not tallied until now due to a court case. Simon Mbugua of PNU was declared the winner.
- August 13 - a Fokker F27-500 cargo aircraft operated by Fly540. crashed about 20 km (12 mi) from the Namber Konton airport near Mogadishu, Somalia. All three crew members died. The aircraft was carrying a shipment of miraa (khat). The plane had departed from Wilson Airport in Nairobi.

=== September ===
- September 25 - By-elections were held in Bomet and Sotik constituencies and were won by Beatrice Kones and Joyce Laboso respectively. Both represent ODM, as did their predecessors, who died in an aviation accident in June.
- September 25 - MV Faina, a Ukrainian ship was seized by Somali pirates off the Somalian coast. The ship was carrying 33 Russian T-72 tanks destined to Kenya.

=== October ===
- October 15 - The post-election violence report by Waki Commission was released.

=== November ===
- November 1 - A Nakumatt Supermarket and other fully operational properties were demolished in Nairobi to pave way for the expansion of Thika Road.
- November 5 - The Kenya people celebrated the election of Barack Obama as president of the United States. The following day November 6 is declared a public holiday in Kenya. His father, Barack Obama, Sr. was raised and buried in Nyang'oma Kogelo village in western Kenya.

=== December ===
- December 11 - Kenyan parliament passes the Kenya Communications (Amendment) Act regulating media in Kenya. Critics say the bill meant to suppress the freedom of press, while the Kenyan government denies it.
- December 19 - Joel Onyancha of Ford-People lost the Bomachoge Constituency parliamentary seat after the 2007 results were nullified due to irregularities
- December 24 - President Kibaki signs a bill disbanding the Electoral Commission of Kenya. It will be replaced by Interim Independent Electoral Commission (IIEC).
- December 31 - Over 120 political parties, four with a parliamentary representation, failed to meet the deadline for complying with the new Political Parties Act and face deregistration.

== Deaths ==
=== January ===
- January 1 - Lucas Sang, former olympic athlete, "hacked to death" in Chepkoilel, Eldoret.
- January 2 - G. G. Njuguna Ngengi, Politician, hacked to death in Kuresoi, near Molo on January 2
- January 20 - Wesley Ngetich Kimutai, 34, marathoner, died after he was shot with an arrow on January 19 in the Trans Mara District.
- January 20 - Donald Odanga, former basketball international was hit by a stray bullet shot by the police.
- January 29 - Mugabe Were, recently elected ODM MP was shot dead in Nairobi.
- January 29 - David Kimutai Too, recently elected ODM MP was shot dead by a policeman in Eldoret.

=== February ===
- February 8 - Stephen Arusei Kipkorir, 37, Kenyan long-distance runner was killed in a car crash.

=== March ===
- March 13 - David Mwenje, 55, former MP and assistant minister died of illness.

=== April ===
- April 4 - Samuel Ndindiri, 59, the National Assembly clerk dies of illness.
- April 10 - Jeremiah Nyagah, 87, former minister, dies of illness

=== May ===
- May 3 - Ngugi wa Mirii, 57, playwright, dies in car accident in Harare, Zimbabwe.
- May 16 - Zachary Gakunju, born 1932, former Gatundu South MP, assistant minister and businessman.
- May 16 - Wycliffe Matwakei Komol, 37, the leader of Sabaot Land Defence Force was shot dead by Kenyan Army.

=== June ===
- June 6 - Omondi Tony (Anthony Omondi Mumbo), musician, founder member of Orchestra Limpopo International
- June 10 - Politicians Kipkalya Kones and Lorna Laboso were killed in an aviation accident.

=== July ===
- July 12 - Reinhard Fabisch, former manager of Kenya national football team. The German national died of cancer aged 57.

=== September ===
- September 17 - Michael Omondi, former field hockey player and Olympic competitor dies of short illness aged 46.

=== October ===
- October 11 - Saeed Cockar, industrial court justice died aged 81.

=== November ===
- November 15 - Reuben Chesire, 67, former MP and assistant minister dies of illness

=== December ===
- December 5 - Rawson Macharia, aged late 80's, prosecution witness at the Kapenguria Six trial, died after being hit by a motorcycle.
- December 30 - Edwin Nyaseda, 56, former Kenya Police commissioner dies of illness

== Sports ==
=== January - March ===
- January 1 - Several new year's road running races were won by Kenyans. Robert Kipkoech Cheruiyot won the Saint Silvester Road Race in Brazil and Patrick Ivuti finished second. Alice Timbilili won the women's race. San Silvestre Vallecana race in Spain was won by Josphat Kiprono Menjo and Vivian Cheruiyot respectively. Edwin Soi and Sylvia Kibet were the winners of Boclassic Silvesterlauf race in Bolzano, Italy. Micah Kogo won Corrida Pedestre Internationale de Houilles race in France, setting a new course record.
- February 9–10 - Kenyan national rugby sevens team reaches main cup semifinal at the 2008 USA Sevens.
- March 19 - Jason Dunford and Janeth Jepkosgei won the 2007 Kenyan Sports Personality of the Year awards for men and women, respectively.
- March 6–9 - The 2008 Kenya Open golf tournament held at Karen Golf Club in Nairobi was won by Iain Pyman of England.

=== April - June ===
- April 13 - Martin Lel beats the course record winning London Marathon for the third time. Samuel Wanjiru finished close second. William Kipsang won the Rotterdam Marathon, also setting a new course record.
- April 21 - Robert Kipkoech Cheruiyot won Boston Marathon for the fourth time.
- April 30-May 4 - The 2008 African Championships in Athletics were held in Ethiopia. Kenya won a total of 16 medals, five of them golden. The Kenyan gold medalists were David Rudisha (800m), Haron Keitany (1500m), Richard Mateelong (3000m steeplechase), Pamela Chelimo (800m) and Grace Wanjiru (20 km walk).
- May 4 - Kenya prisons wins the 2008 Women’s African Clubs Championship in volleyball.
- May 31 - June 22 - Kenya national football team plays four 2010 FIFA World Cup qualifier matches over four consecutive weekends, losing to Namibia away, winning Guinea and Zimbabwe at home and drawing with Zimbabwe away.
- June 1 – 18-year-old Pamela Jelimo runs a new women's 800 metres African Record. The previous one was held by Maria de Lurdes Mutola of Mozambique.
- June 22, 2008: Kenya wins the 2008 edition of Safari Sevens. In the final, Kenya beat Emerging Springboks 31–12.
- June 27–29 - The 2008 Safari Rally was won by Lee Rose, former Kenyan champion.

=== July - September ===
- July 8–13 - The 2008 World Junior Championships in Athletics were held in Bydgoszcz, Poland. Kenya finished third in the medals table by winning four gold medals, five silver and three bronze. Kenyan gold medalists were Josphat Bett (10,000m men), Jonathan Muia (3,000m SC men), Mercy Cherono (3,000m women) and Christine Kambua (3,000m SC women).
- July 27 - Tusker FC wins the 2008 edition of CECAFA Clubs Cup.
- August 2–5 - Kenya fails at the 2009 ICC World Twenty20 Qualifier
- August 8–24 - The 2008 Summer Olympics were held in Beijing, China. Kenya got a medal record of 5-5-4. All of Kenya's medallists came from the Olympic athletics competition. The gold medalists were Wilfred Bungei (800m men), Brimin Kipruto (steeplechase men), Samuel Wanjiru (marathon men), Pamela Jelimo (800m women) and Nancy Lagat (1500m women)
- August 30 - Kenya Harlequins wins Kenya Cup, the prime rugby union competition on Kenya
- September 5 - Pamela Jelimo wins the IAAF Golden League jackpot
- September 6 - Kenya wins a 2010 World Cup Qualifier against Namibia at home.
- September 9–12 - The Women’s junior African Nations Championship in volleyball was held in Kenya. The tournament was won by Egypt, while Kenya finished third out of five participants

=== October - December ===
- October 12 - Kenya lost a FIFA World Cup 2010 qualifier to Guinea, but qualifies for the final qualifying round
- November 22 - Mathare United wins its maiden Kenyan Premier League title.
- November 23 - Baldev Chager clinches the 2008 Kenya National Rally Championship title.
- December 1–7 - The 2008 African Swimming Championships were held in Johannesburg, South Africa. Kenya won five gold medals; three by Jason Dunford and two by Achieng Ajulu-Bushell.
