= 2007 in Kenya =

- Decades: 1980s; 1990s; 2000s; 2010s; 2020s
- See also: Other events of 2007; Timeline of Kenyan history

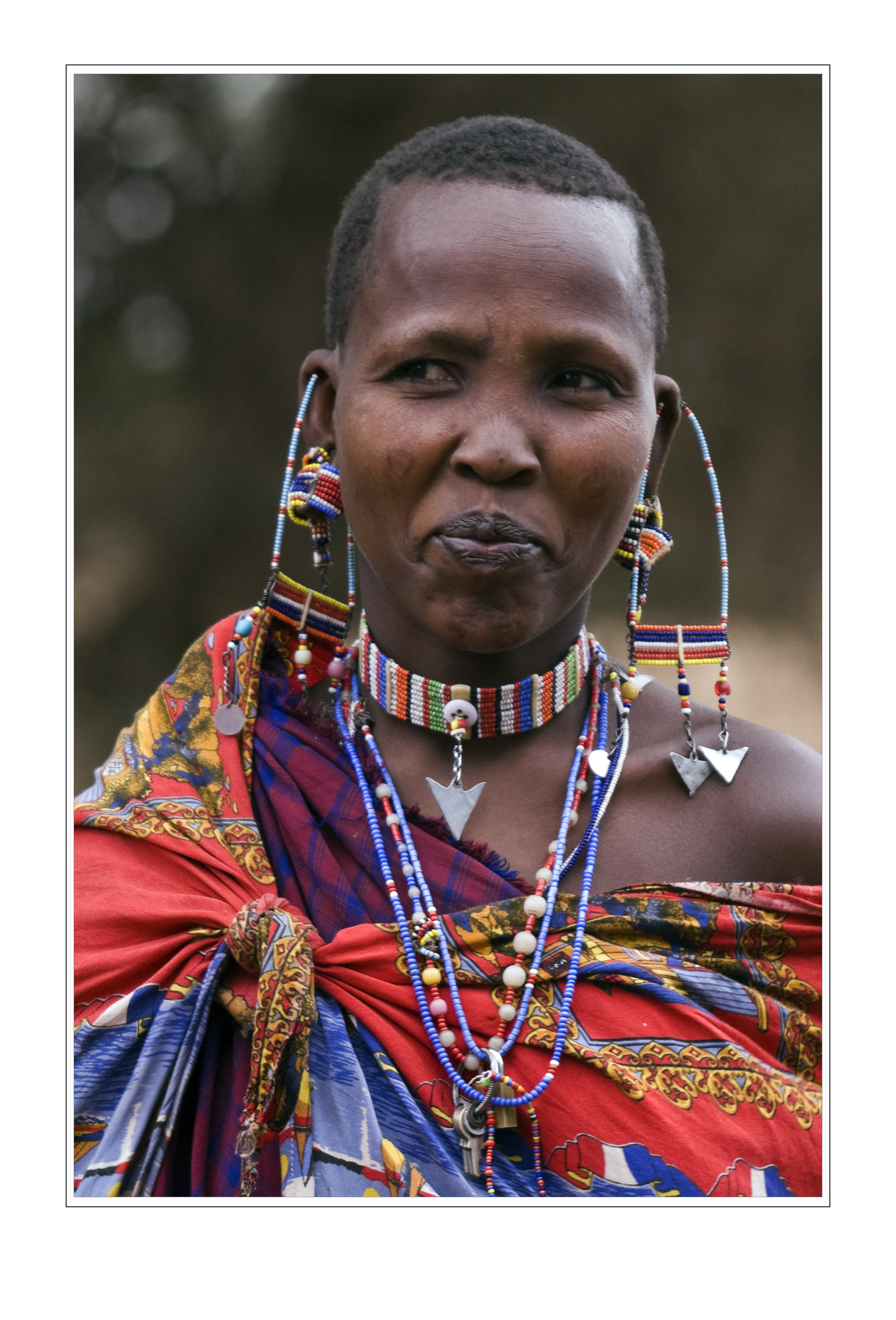
Kenyan woman, 2007

The following lists events that happened during 2007 in Kenya.

== Incumbents ==
- President: Mwai Kibaki
- Vice-President of Kenya: Moody Awori
- Chief Justice: Johnson Gicheru

== Events ==
=== January ===
- January 1 – Kenya tightens security at Somalian border in order to prevent Islamic Courts Union militants from entering Kenya
- January 4 – Three Administration Police officers shot dead near Molo, Nakuru District. On January 7 two suspects were shot down by police in Elburgon, Nakuru District. Plenty of stolen property were found at their hideout
- January 14 – Rift Valley Fever outbreak in northeastern Kenya has reached a death toll of 95, out of 248 reported cases. Most affected are Garissa, Wajir, Ijara and Tana River districts. Several international and domestic health organisations have provided vaccines and other aid to overcome the outbreak.
- January 19 – Kiraitu Murungi and David Mwiraria were cleared from allegations of being involved with the Anglo-Leasing scandal.
- January 20–25 – World Social Forum meeting held in Nairobi.
- January 23 – A recording of a conversation involving David Mwiraria recorded on 11 June 2004 is released by John Githongo. According to the tape, Mwiraria tried to stop investigations on the Anglo-Leasing scandal, in which he was a suspect. However, The Kenya Anti Corruption Commission (KACC) downplayed the tape stating it did not reveal anything new.
- January 30 – Ban Ki-moon, the new Secretary General of United Nations visits Kenya.

=== February ===
- February 18 – The statue of Dedan Kimathi was unveiled in Nairobi. The date coincided with the 50th anniversary of his execution by colonial administration.
- February 20 – Simon Matheri Ikere, the most wanted criminal as declared by Kenya Police, is shot by the police after they surrounded him, having been located through tracing of his mobile phone.
- February 28 – the 2006 Kenya Certificate of Secondary Education results were published. Starehe Boys Centre was ranked the best high school in Kenya, followed by Strathmore School and Alliance High School.

=== March ===
- March 4 – Five dangerous criminals escaped Nakuru GK Prison.
- March 15 – Internal Security minister John Michuki proposes new tough laws against possession of illegal firearms. Similarly, the police was given a tight shoot-to-kill directive. These amendments aim at decreasing violent crime in Kenya.
- March 19 – President Mwai Kibaki proposes constitutional reforms to be implemented before general elections set to be held in December 2007. Especially opposition members have demanded new constitutional reforms.

=== April ===
- April 3 – Tribal clashes in Mount Elgon District continue as four shops were burnt in Makutano trading centre.
- April 24 – A policeman is shot dead by Mungiki sect in Kiambu District

=== May ===
- May 1 – During his labour day speech, President Mwai Kibaki promises to scrap tuition fees issued by public high schools.
- May 4 – Ethnic violence in Mt. Elgon area continues, ten people were shot dead in Kitale.
- May 5 – Kenya Airways Flight 507 crashes in Cameroon shortly after take-off. All 114 on board perished.
- May 14 – By-election held in Magarini constituency was won by Harrison Garama Kombe of Shirikisho Party
- May 19 – Three wildlife rangers and four suspected poachers were shot dead during a gunfight in Tana River District.
- May 28 – Kenyan economy grew by 6.1 per cent in 2006, according to the government. It is the highest growth rate in Kenya in three decades.

=== June ===
- June 8 – Over 30 suspected Mungiki members have been killed by the police within a week, following recent violence by the sect.
- June 21 – Eleven people were killed around Nairobi. These killings happened after John Kamunya (aka Maina Njenga), a former Mungiki leader was jailed for five years.

=== July ===
- July 5 – Eight Kenyan cattle raiders have been killed by the Uganda People's Defence Force.
- July 5 – Five people were shot dead by criminals in Stony Athi, Machakos District.
- July 18 – Earth tremors have been felt in Nairobi and elsewhere Kenya during few past days. The tremors were related to the activity of Ol Doinyo Lengai volcano in Tanzania.

=== August ===
- August 2 – Charity Ngilu, the minister of health, was arrested for several hours in Nairobi. This happened after Ngilu allegedly freed Anne Njogu, a detained human rights activist.
- August 11 – Several people die following mudslides near Malava, western Kenya.
- August 29 – 20 people die in a road accident near Yala town as a bus and petrol tanker collide.
- August 31 – The Guardian newspaper featured on its front page a story about corruption by the family of the former Kenyan president Daniel arap Moi. They claim their source of the information was WikiLeaks. Government spokesman Alfred Mutua dismissed the claims.

=== September ===
- September 1 – Kalonzo Musyoka and Raila Odinga were selected as presidential candidates by their respective ODM fractions, having split into two in August. Meanwhile, former president Daniel arap Moi has declared his support for president Mwai Kibaki's bid to win second term.
- September 8–14 – Ten thousand tea plantation workers undertook strike action against Unilever Tea Kenya Ltd in Kericho region.

=== October ===
- October 9 – Twelve people were killed when a bus plunged into River Sio in Matayos, near Busia town.
- October 17 – John Njue, the newly appointed Archbishop of Nairobi, is now elevated to cardinal status. He became the second Kenyan cardinal, the other was Maurice Michael Otunga, who died in 2003.

=== November ===
- November 17 – Main political parties (ODM, ODM-K and PNU) held their primary elections selecting parliamentary and civic candidates for the upcoming general elections. These primaries were marred by irregularities and violence. Numerous candidates defected to smaller parties after failing to get candidature by their respective parties.
- November 23 – Solomon Nyanjui, the missing KWS helicopter pilot was found alive with minor injuries, after being missing for eight days. The helicopter he was flying had crashed on the flanks of Mount Kenya, near Chuka town.

=== December ===
- December 27 – Kenyan general election, 2007 were held. The results were released amidst allegations of fraud. The elections were followed by civil unrest. See also 2008 in Kenya.

== Deaths ==
- January 4 – John Ngunjiri, a national level rally driver dies of illness aged 49.
- January 8 – Fazul Abdullah Mohammed – a Kenyan national, who is suspected of the 1998 United States embassy bombings in Nairobi and Dar es Salaam dies in a US air strike.
- January 17 – Alice Auma, Ugandan rebel dies in a Dadaab refugee camp in Kenya.
- February 4 – Job Bwayo, Kenyan AIDS researcher dies in a violent attack aged 61.
- February 12 – Violet Barasa, 31, Kenyan women's volleyball team captain and Olympic competitor, illness.
- March 1 – Stephen Mukangu, former MP and assistant minister
- March 22 – Kisoi Munyao, man who brought the Kenyan flag on the top of Mount Kenya at independence. He died of stomach cancer aged 73.
- April 4 – Grace Wahu, former wife of former president Jomo Kenyatta.
- June 9 – Achieng Oneko, freedom fighter and former politician, dies of heart attack aged 87.
- August 15 – Tom Ochieng O'Omwombo, National Olympic Committee of Kenya (NOCK) secretary-general dies of illness in Beijing, China.
- September 3 – Sharon Wangwe, a musician (stage name Lady S) died in a road accident.
- October 6 – Darius Msagha Mbela – former cabinet minister, died aged 67.
- October 8 – Taitta Toweett – former minister of education, traffic accident near Nakuru, aged 81.
- November 27 – Nicodemus Kirima, Roman Catholic Archbishop of Nyeri, dies in Nairobi Hospital following a coma induced by kidney problems. Kirima was aged 71 (born 1936).
- December 25, Mighty King Kong, a Kenyan reggae musician dies of short illness aged 33.

== Sports ==
=== January – March ===
- January 4 – Mushir Salim Jawher, a Kenyan-born Bahraini athlete participated in the Tiberias Marathon held in Israel (and won the race). He was the first athlete from an Arab country to compete in Israel, and was subsequently stripped of his Bahraini citizenship. Although the decision was later revoked, Jawher decided to represent Kenya again under his birth name Leonard Mucheru Maina.
- January 18–24 – Cricket tri-series featuring Kenya, Scotland and Canada is held in Mombasa, Kenya. The Kenyan team won the series.
- January 29 – February 4 – Africa Cup of Clubs, the continental field hockey tournament is held in Nairobi. Telkom Kenya wins the women's category while Sharkia of Egypt wins the men's title.
- January 29 – February 7 – 2007 ICC World Cricket League Division One tournament held in Nairobi. Kenya wins the tournament by beating Scotland in its final.
- February 9 – Samuel Wanjiru of Kenya sets the new half marathon world record (58:53) in Ras al-Khaimah, United Arab Emirates.
- February 22 – The 2006 Kenyan Sports Personality of the Year awards were held in Nairobi. Alex Kipchirchir was selected Sportsman of the Year while Janeth Jepkosgei received Sportswoman of the Year award.
- March 8–11 – Edoardo Molinari from Italy wins 2007 Kenya Open golf tournament held in Karen Golf and Country Club, Nairobi. Jacob Okello was the best placed Kenyan golfer. Kenya Open is part of the Challenge Tour.
- March 9 – FIFA lifts ban on Kenya Football Federation.
- March 9–11 – 2007 edition of Safari Rally was held in Kenya. It was won by Conrad Rautenbach, from Zimbabwe.
- March 14–24 – Kenya participated the 2007 Cricket World Cup held in West Indies. Kenya won Canada but lost to New Zealand and England, failing to advance the top-8 stage.
- March 17 – Samuel Wanjiru set again new half marathon world record by running 58:35 in The Hague, Netherlands.
- March 24 – 2007 IAAF World Cross Country Championships were held in Mombasa, Kenya.
- March 25 – Kenya beat Swaziland, 2–0, in an African cup of Nations qualifier. The match was played at Nyayo National Stadium, Nairobi.

=== April – June ===
- April 7–8 – Kenya sevens team reaches main cup semifinals at 2007 Adelaide Sevens.
- April 15–22 – Three major marathon races were won by Kenyan men: Rotterdam Marathon was won by Joshua Chelanga, Boston Marathon by Robert Cheruiyot and London Marathon by Martin Lel.
- May 27 – 2007 edition of the Mombasa Marathon was won by Peter Kemboi. His time 2:09:21 was the fastest marathon time run in Kenya. Juliet Jepchirchir won women's category.
- June 3 – Kenya plays a goalless draw with Swaziland at the African Nations cup qualifier in Lobamba, Swaziland.
- June 10 – Safari Sevens rugby tournament was held in Nairobi and won by Emerging Boks, the development team of South Africa .
- June 16 – Kenyan football team is defeated by Eritrea, 0–1, at the African Nations cup qualifier in Asmara, Eritrea. Following the result, Kenya can not qualify for the finals.

=== July – September ===
- July 11–15 – 2007 World Youth Championships in Athletics were held in Ostrava, Czech Republic. Kenya won 6 gold, 4 silver and 1 bronze. Kenya earned second place in the medal table, after United States.
- July 11–23 – All-Africa Games were held in Algeria. Kenya won eight gold medals: Jason Dunford (50 m 100 m, and 200 m butterfly swimming), Willy Komen (3,000 m steeplechase), Ruth Bosibori (3,000 m steeplechase), Asbel Kiprop (1,500 m), Dickson Wamwiri (Tae Kwon Do, 58 kg flyweight), Suleiman Bilali (Flyweight boxing). In addition, Kenya won five paralympic gold medals: Abraham Tarbei (5,000 m T46, 1,500 m T46), Henry Kirwa (5,000 m T12), Samuel Muchai (1,500 m T11), Henry Wanyoike (5,000 m T11)
- July 14–22 – African Field Hockey Qualifiers for the 2008 Olympics were held in Nairobi, Kenya. South African men's and women's teams won their respective competitions and took only available places for the Olympics. Kenyan men's team finished second and women's team second.
- August 9–12: African Junior Championships in Athletics were held in Ouagadougou, Burkina Faso. Kenya topped the medal table by winning 13 gold, 5 silver and 3 bronze.
- August 24 – September 2: 2007 World Championships in Athletics were held in Osaka, Japan. Kenya fared well and won five gold medals, second only to United States. In addition, Kenya won three silver and five bronze medals. Kenyan gold medalists were Luke Kibet (marathon), Brimin Kipruto (3,000 m steeplechase), Janeth Jepkosgei (800 m), Catherine Ndereba (marathon) and Alfred Yego (800 m).
- September 8 – Kenya beat Angola, 2–1, in an African Nations Cup qualifier. The game was non-essential for both teams, since Angola had already qualified and Kenya was unable to qualify.
- September 11 – Kenya women's national volleyball team wins Women's African Volleyball Championship held in Nairobi. Kenya did not lose a set, becoming the first team to do so at African Championships.

=== October – December ===
- October 7 – Patrick Ivuti of Kenya won Chicago Marathon
- October 21 – Carl Tundo secures 2007 Kenya National Rally Championship title.
- October 28 – Nairobi Marathon was held in Nairobi. Winners were John Njoroge and Rose Chesire Jepkemboi.
- November 5 – Martin Lel won the 2007 edition of New York City Marathon. Earlier this year Lel had won London Marathon, another major marathon race.

== See also ==
- 2007 in Africa
