= Human rights in Kenya =

Human rights in Kenya internationally maintain a variety of mixed opinions; specifically, political freedoms are highlighted as being poor and homosexuality remains a crime. In the Freedom in the World index for 2017, Kenya held a rating of '4' for civil liberties and political freedoms, in which a scale of "1" (most free) to "7" (least free) is practiced.

== History ==
=== Jomo Kenyatta (1964 – 1978) ===
During the first post-independence presidency of Kenya, under the leadership of the late President Jomo Kenyatta, state security forces harassed dissidents and were suspected of complicity in several murders of prominent personalities deemed as threats to his regime, including Pio Gama Pinto, Tom Mboya and J.M. Kariuki. MP and Lawyer C.M.G. Argwings-Kodhek and former Kadu Leader and minister Ronald Ngala who died in suspicious car accidents 25 December 1972 .

=== Daniel Arap Moi (1978–2002) ===
The Daniel Arap Moi administration consistently received international criticism for its record on human rights. Under Moi's leadership, security forces regularly subjected opposition leaders and pro-democracy activists to arbitrary arrest, detention without trial, abuse in custody, and deadly force.

International aid donors and governments such as the United States, Germany, the United Kingdom, and Norway periodically broke off diplomatic relations and suspended aid allocations, pending human rights improvement.

=== Emilio Stanley Mwai Kibaki (since 2002) ===
Since 2002, under the late Mwai Kibaki's presidency, politically motivated human rights violations have diminished, but other serious human rights abuses persist, a great many at the hands of security forces, particularly the police. The police force is widely viewed as the most corrupt entity in the country, given to extorting bribes, complicity in criminal activity, and using excessive force against both criminal suspects and crowds. Most police who commit abuses still do so with impunity. Prison conditions remain life-threatening.

Apart from police and penal system abuses, infringements of rights in the course of legal proceedings are widespread, despite recent pressure on judicial personnel. Freedom of speech and of the press continue to be compromised through various forms of harassment of journalists and activists.

Violence and discrimination against women are rife. The abuse of children, including in forced labor and prostitution, is a serious problem. Female genital mutilation (FGM) remains widespread, despite 2001 legislation against it for girls under 16. The abuse of women and girls, including early marriage and wife inheritance, is a factor in the spread of human immunodeficiency virus/acquired immune deficiency syndrome (HIV/AIDS).

Kenya made some progress in 2003, when it set up a national human rights institution, the Kenya National Commission on Human Rights (KNCHR), with a mandate to ensure Kenya's compliance with international human rights standards. Also, parliament passed the Children's Act to ensure the protection of minors, as well as the Disability Act, outlawing discrimination against the disabled.

In November 2005 the Kenyan government banned rallies of opposition parties, rejecting calls for new elections. Vice President Moody Awori stated:

The government considers these calls for nationwide rallies inappropriate and a threat to national security ...
Accordingly, the government will not allow the planned rallies and wananchi (citizens) are cautioned not to attend the meetings.

On 3 June 2007, two days after President Mwai Kibaki stated that Mungiki members "should expect no mercy", about 300 Mungiki members were arrested and at least 20 killed. John Michuki, at the time Minister for Internal Security, publicly stated following the killings, "We will pulverize and finish them off. Even those arrested over the recent killings, I cannot tell you where they are today. What you will certainly hear is that so and so's burial is tomorrow". In the KNCHR's Cry of Blood – Report on Extra-Judicial Killings and Disappearances published in September 2008, the KNCHR reported these in their key finding "e)", stating that the forced disappearances and extrajudicial killings appeared to be official policy.

In The Cry of Blood report, the KNCHR's first key finding "a)" was that "the evidence gathered by the KNCHR establishes patterns of conduct by the Kenya Police that may constitute crimes against humanity.

On 5 March 2009, two of the human rights investigators involved in the investigations documented in the report, Oscar Kamau Kingara and John Paul Oulu, were assassinated. Their assassinations were attributed by non-governmental organisations to the security forces.

In 2009 and 2010, Samburu people suffered severe human rights violations.

The following chart shows Kenya's ratings since 1972 in the Freedom in the World reports, published annually by Freedom House.

Historic ratings

A rating of 1 is "free"; 7, "not free".^{1}

Year	Political Rights	Civil Liberties	Status	President^{2}
1972	5	4	Partly Free	Jomo Kenyatta
1973	5	4	Partly Free	Jomo Kenyatta
1974	5	4	Partly Free	Jomo Kenyatta
1975	5	5	Partly Free	Jomo Kenyatta
1976	5	5	Partly Free	Jomo Kenyatta
1977	5	5	Partly Free	Jomo Kenyatta
1978	5	4	Partly Free	Daniel arap Moi
1979	5	4	Partly Free	Daniel arap Moi
1980	5	4	Partly Free	Daniel arap Moi
1981	5	5	Partly Free	Daniel arap Moi
1982^{3}	5	5	Partly Free	Daniel arap Moi
1983	5	5	Partly Free	Daniel arap Moi
1984	6	5	Partly Free	Daniel arap Moi
1985	6	5	Partly Free	Daniel arap Moi
1986	6	5	Partly Free	Daniel arap Moi
1987	6	6	Not Free	Daniel arap Moi
1988	6	6	Not Free	Daniel arap Moi
1989	6	6	Not Free	Daniel arap Moi
1990	6	6	Not Free	Daniel arap Moi
1991	6	6	Not Free	Daniel arap Moi
1992	4	5	Partly Free	Daniel arap Moi
1993	5	6	Not Free	Daniel arap Moi
1994	6	6	Not Free	Daniel arap Moi
1995	7	6	Not Free	Daniel arap Moi
1996	7	6	Not Free	Daniel arap Moi
1997	6	6	Not Free	Daniel arap Moi
1998	6	5	Not Free	Daniel arap Moi
1999	6	5	Not Free	Daniel arap Moi
2000	6	5	Not Free	Daniel arap Moi
2001	6	5	Not Free	Daniel arap Moi
2002	4	4	Partly Free	Mwai Kibaki
2003	3	3	Partly Free	Mwai Kibaki
2004	3	3	Partly Free	Mwai Kibaki
2005	3	3	Partly Free	Mwai Kibaki
2006	3	3	Partly Free	Mwai Kibaki
2007	4	3	Partly Free	Mwai Kibaki
2008	4	3	Partly Free	Mwai Kibaki
2009	4	4	Partly Free	Mwai Kibaki
2010	4	3	Partly Free	Mwai Kibaki
2011	4	3	Partly Free	Mwai Kibaki
2012	4	4	Partly Free	Mwai Kibaki
2013	4	4	Partly Free	Uhuru Kenyatta
2014	4	4	Partly Free	Uhuru Kenyatta
2015	4	4	Partly Free	Uhuru Kenyatta
2016	4	4	Partly Free	Uhuru Kenyatta
2017	4	4	Partly Free	Uhuru Kenyatta
2018	4	4	Partly Free	Uhuru Kenyatta
2019	4	4	Partly Free	Uhuru Kenyatta
2020	4	4	Partly Free	Uhuru Kenyatta
2021	4	4	Partly Free	Uhuru Kenyatta
2022	4	4	Partly Free	William Ruto
2023	4	4	Partly Free	William Ruto

== International treaties ==
Kenya's stances on international human rights treaties are as follows:

International treaties
Treaty	Organization	Introduced	Signed	Ratified
Convention on the Prevention and Punishment of the Crime of Genocide	United Nations	1948	—	—
International Convention on the Elimination of All Forms of Racial Discrimination	United Nations	1966	—	2001
International Covenant on Economic, Social and Cultural Rights	United Nations	1966	—	1972
International Covenant on Civil and Political Rights	United Nations	1966	—	1972
First Optional Protocol to the International Covenant on Civil and Political Rights	United Nations	1966	—	—
Convention on the Non-Applicability of Statutory Limitations to War Crimes and Crimes Against Humanity	United Nations	1968	—	1972
International Convention on the Suppression and Punishment of the Crime of Apartheid	United Nations	1973	1974	—
Convention on the Elimination of All Forms of Discrimination against Women	United Nations	1979	—	1984
Convention against Torture and Other Cruel, Inhuman or Degrading Treatment or Punishment	United Nations	1984	—	1997
Convention on the Rights of the Child	United Nations	1989	1990	1990
Second Optional Protocol to the International Covenant on Civil and Political Rights, aiming at the abolition of the death penalty	United Nations	1989	—	—
International Convention on the Protection of the Rights of All Migrant Workers and Members of Their Families	United Nations	1990	—	—
Optional Protocol to the Convention on the Elimination of All Forms of Discrimination against Women	United Nations	1999	—	—
Optional Protocol to the Convention on the Rights of the Child on the Involvement of Children in Armed Conflict	United Nations	2000	2000	2002
Optional Protocol to the Convention on the Rights of the Child on the Sale of Children, Child Prostitution and Child Pornography	United Nations	2000	2000	—
Convention on the Rights of Persons with Disabilities	United Nations	2006	2007	2008
Optional Protocol to the Convention on the Rights of Persons with Disabilities	United Nations	2006		—
International Convention for the Protection of All Persons from Enforced Disappearance	United Nations	2006	2007	—
Optional Protocol to the International Covenant on Economic, Social and Cultural Rights	United Nations	2008	—	—
Optional Protocol to the Convention on the Rights of the Child on a Communications Procedure	United Nations	2011	—	—

== Press freedom ==
=== Under British rule ===
The seeds of the press, and media in general, were planted by English missionaries colonizing Kenya. The basic function of the publications, such as The Taveta Chronicle, Leader, and Uganda Mail was to disseminate British news and create a sense of legitimacy for the English missionaries. These practices continued with the introduction of the radio in 1928. However, press rights for native Kenyans were severely limited. Any opportunities for native Kenyans to access the press were used to make pleas for their freedom from colonial rule.

=== After independence ===
Individual press freedoms for the citizens of Kenya were still rather limited after they gained Independence. The new Kenyan government took control of most forms of the media in order to spread their vision of Kenyan ideals. However, at this time privately owned newspapers, such as the Standard emerged, although these private entities were still subject to governmental control and censorship.

=== 2010 Constitution ===
The newest Constitution of the Kenyan government for the first time fully enumerated some individual rights to expression and information. However, there is a lack of unilateral freedom of expression for Kenyan citizens. Amongst the most notable omissions from the enumerated rights is the right to express propaganda for war or an incitement of violence. Moreover, the Kenyan government still retains some control over the spread of dissenting ideas during wartime. In the realm of media specifically, the Constitution prohibits the government from interfering with the spread of truthful information or with any individual's right to access to that information. The government nonetheless sets standards for media content and regulates the enforcement of those rules.

=== Present-day press rights ===
The Kenyan government, however, did not intend to staunchly adhere to these new mandates of the constitution. As recently as 2013, Kenyan policymakers amended previous laws to limit certain media coverage of terrorist attacks and attempted to suppress the reporting of the deteriorating safety in Kenya. The amendment to the Kenya Information and Communication Act works to stifle efforts of publications that put forth critical perspectives of the Kenyan government. Although there have been some governmental efforts to enhance the press freedoms of Kenyan citizens, such as The Media Council Bill of 2013 which created a governmental body that would promote and protect the freedom of the media, the enforcement of the act did more harm than good in promoting press freedoms. According to an independent study conducted by Freedom House, Kenya's press rights are considered to be somewhat comprehensive. The press is only considered "partly free" largely because of the governmental efforts to enact laws that grant more control over media and publications. Moreover, previous laws, such as the Preservation of Public Security Act, which give the government the right to declare any information to be a security threat and censor that information, are still in effect and have yet to be repealed or amended.

== Women's Issues ==
=== Forced marriages ===
In Kenya, climate change and recurring droughts have exacerbated poverty and gender inequality, contributing to a rise in forced and child marriages, particularly in arid regions like Marsabit County. Since at least 2022, prolonged dry spells have led to the loss of livestock and food insecurity, prompting some families to marry off daughters in exchange for resources such as camels and goats. Girls as young as 15 have been married to older men, often without consent, as a survival strategy amid worsening environmental conditions. Local organizations, such as the Indigenous Resource Management Organization (IREMO), report that these practices are accompanied by increased vulnerability to sexual violence, as girls and women are forced to travel longer distances for water or grazing, often alone. Spousal rape is also not explicitly criminalized.

=== Violence Against Women ===
Domestic violence and rape continue to be issues, particularly in rural areas, where resources are more scarce. Domestic abuse is cited by authorities as being the most common preventable, non-accidental death for women, and police are often reluctant or unwilling to intervene because it is viewed as a private family matter. Women working on tea and flower farms are often subject to coerced sexual activity in exchange for employment opportunities.

== See also ==
- Kenya Human Rights Commission
- Kenya National Commission on Human Rights
- Centre for Minority Rights Development (Cemiride), an NGO advocacy group that works on behalf of minority and indigenous communities in Kenya and East Africa.
- Internet censorship and surveillance in Kenya
- LGBT rights in Kenya
- Prizm Project, a human rights education program for young women in Kenya and South Africa.

== Notes ==
1.Note that the "Year" signifies the "Year covered". Therefore the information for the year marked 2008 is from the report published in 2009, and so on.
2.As of 1 January.
3.The 1982 report covers the year 1981 and the first half of 1982, and the following 1984 report covers the second half of 1982 and the whole of 1983. In the interest of simplicity, these two aberrant "year and a half" reports have been split into three-year-long reports through interpolation.
