= 2006 in Kenya =

- Decades: 1980s; 1990s; 2000s; 2010s; 2020s
- See also: Other events of 2006; Timeline of Kenyan history

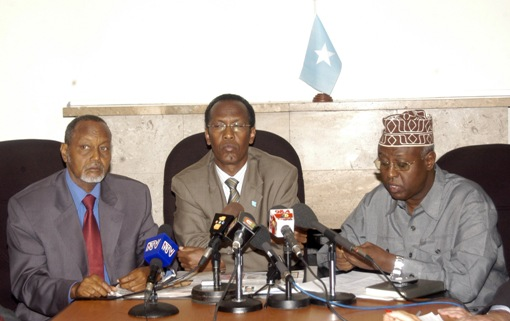
Somali Prime minister Mohamed Ali Ghedi (centre) in Kenya, 2006.

The following lists events that happened during 2006 in Kenya.

== Incumbents ==
- President: Mwai Kibaki
- Vice-President: Moody Awori
- Chief Justice: Johnson Gicheru

== Events ==
=== January ===
- January 15 - President Mwai Kibaki has declared the ongoing drought a national disaster and appeal for US$150 million to feed the hungry. The lack of rains over the last three years has left 2.5 million people close to starvation.
- January 23 - A five-story building in Nairobi collapses and kills at least eight people, burying dozens more. Rescuers use their bare hands to dig through the rubble.

=== February ===
- February 13 - In a televised address to the nation, Kenyan President Mwai Kibaki announces the resignations of two government ministers in connection with two separate corruption scandals, the "Goldenberg" and "Anglo Leasing" affairs. Energy minister Kiraitu Murungi and education minister George Saitoti both deny any wrongdoing.
- February 14 - Kenyan police instruct 20 leading figures not to leave the country as investigations into two corruption scandals, the Goldenberg and Anglo Leasing scandals continue. Among the people told to hand in their passports is George Saitoti whose resignation as education minister was announced by President Mwai Kibaki yesterday. Meanwhile, 80 Members of Parliament have demanded the resignation of Deputy President Moody Awori, who is accused of involvement in the Anglo-Leasing scandal.
- February 16 - Oxfam reports hundreds of thousands are affected by severe water shortages in Kenya and Somalia.

=== March ===
- March 3 - Kenya and Sudan, completing trade talks that have gone on since 2001, announce plans to sign a landmark trade agreement. Kenya, which is currently in a drought, is in desperate need of food to feed 3.5 million Kenyans by the end of March, despite the presence of the U.N. food agency. Sudan has had a huge surplus this season.
- March 17 - Six people have been charged in connection with Kenya's biggest fraud, which cost the government about $600m.

=== April ===
- April 10 - 2006 Kenya plane crash, 14 people and a number of politicians are killed in a plane crash near Marsabit.

=== June ===
- June 16 - Evangelist Gilbert Deya is arrested by police at Edinburgh Sheriff Court in relation to allegations by Kenyan police of involvement in child trafficking.

=== October ===
- October 10 - A couple is caught having sex in a mosque during Ramadan in Gilgil and are sentenced to 18 months in prison.
