= Wazi =

Wazi may refer to:

- Wazi campaign, nationwide public awareness campaign that used 3-D animation to convey messages of peace and good governance in Kenya
- Wazi Abdul Hamid (born 1971), Malaysian motorcycle cub prix rider
- Camp Waziyatah, summer camp in Waterford, 50 miles from Portland, Maine, United States
