= 2007 in Africa =

== Incumbents ==
- Algeria
  - President – Abdelaziz Bouteflika, President of Algeria (1999–2019)
  - Prime Minister – Abdelaziz Belkhadem, Prime Minister of Algeria (2006–2008)
- Angola
  - President – José Eduardo dos Santos, President of Angola (1979–2017)
  - Prime Minister – Fernando da Piedade Dias dos Santos, Prime Minister of Angola (2002–2008)
- Benin
  - President – Thomas Boni Yayi, President of Benin (2006–2016)
- Botswana
  - President – Festus Mogae, President of Botswana (1998–2008)
- Burundi
  - President – Pierre Nkurunziza, President of Burundi (2005–2020)
- Cameroon
  - President – Paul Biya, President of Cameroon (1982–present)
  - Prime Minister Ephraïm Inoni, Prime Minister of Cameroon (2004–2009)
- Cape Verde
  - President – Pedro Pires, President of Cape Verde (2001–2011)
  - Prime Minister – José Maria Neves, Prime Minister of Cape Verde (2001–2016)
- Central African Republic
  - President – François Bozizé, President of Central African Republic (2003–2013)
  - Prime Minister – Élie Doté, Prime Minister of Central African Republic (2005–2008)
- Chad
  - President – Idriss Déby, President of Chad (1990–2021)
  - Prime Minister –
    1. Pascal Yoadimnadji, Prime Minister of Chad (2005–2007)
    2. Adoum Younousmi, Prime Minister of Chad (acting) (2007)
    3. Delwa Kassiré Koumakoye, Prime Minister of Chad (acting) (2007–2008)
- Comoros
  - President – Ahmed Abdallah Mohamed Sambi, President of Comoros (2006–2011)
- Republic of the Congo
  - President – Denis Sassou Nguesso, President of the Republic of the Congo (1997–present)
  - Prime Minister – Isidore Mvouba, Prime Minister of the Republic of the Congo (2005–2009)
- Côte d'Ivoire
  - President – Laurent Gbagbo, President of Côte d'Ivoire (2000–2011)
  - Prime Minister –
    1. Charles Konan Banny, Prime Minister of Côte d'Ivoire (2005–2007)
    2. Guillaume Soro, Prime Minister of Côte d'Ivoire (2007–2012)
- Democratic Republic of the Congo
  - President – Joseph Kabila, President of the Democratic Republic of the Congo (2001–2019)
  - Prime Minister – Antoine Gizenga, Prime Minister of the Democratic Republic of the Congo (2006–2008)
- Djibouti
  - President – Ismaïl Omar Guelleh, President of Djibouti (1999–present)
  - Prime Minister – Dileita Mohamed Dileita, Prime Minister of Djibouti (2001–2013)
- Egypt
  - President – Hosni Mubarak, President of Egypt (1981–2011)
  - Prime Minister – Ahmed Nazif, Prime Minister of Egypt (2004–2011)
- Equatorial Guinea
  - President – Teodoro Obiang Nguema Mbasogo, President of Equatorial Guinea (1982–present)
  - Prime Minister – Ricardo Mangue Obama Nfubea, Prime Minister of Equatorial Guinea (2006–2008)
- Eritrea
  - President – Isaias Afwerki, President of Eritrea (1993–present)
- Ethiopia
  - President – Girma Wolde-Giorgis, President of Ethiopia (2001-2013)
  - Prime Minister – Meles Zenawi, Prime Minister of Ethiopia (1995-2012)
- Gabon
  - President – Omar Bongo, President of Gabon (1967–2009)
  - Prime Minister –
    1. Jean-François Ntoutoume Emane, Prime Minister of Gabon (1999-2006)
    2. Jean Eyeghé Ndong, Prime Minister of Gabon (2006-2009)
- Gambia
  - President – Yahya Jammeh, President of Gambia (1996-2017)
- Ghana
  - President – John Kufuor, President of Ghana (2001-2009)
- Guinea
  - President – Lansana Conté, President of Guinea (1984-2008)
- Guinea-Bissau
  - President – João Bernardo Vieira, President of Guinea-Bissau (2005–2009)
  - Prime Minister –
    1. Aristides Gomes, Prime Minister of Guinea-Bissau (2005–2007)
    2. Martinho Ndafa Kabi, Prime Minister of Guinea-Bissau (2007–2008)
- Kenya
  - President – Mwai Kibaki, President of Kenya (2002–2013)
- Lesotho
  - Monarch – Letsie III, Monarch of Lesotho (1996–present)
  - Prime Minister – Pakalitha Mosisili, Prime Minister of Lesotho (1998–2012)
- Liberia
  - President – Ellen Sirleaf Johnson, President of Liberia (2006–2018)
- Libya
  - President – Muhammad az-Zanati, Chairman of the Presidential Council (1992–2008)
  - Prime Minister – Baghdadi Mahmudi, Prime Minister of Libya (2006–2011)
- Malawi
  - President – Bingu wa Mutharika, President of Malawi (2004–2012)
- Mali
  - President – Amadou Toumani Touré, President of Mali (2002–2012)
  - Prime Minister –
    1. Ousmane Issoufi Maïga, Prime Minister of Mali (2004–2007)
    2. Modibo Sidibé, Prime Minister of Mali (2007–2011)
- Mauritania
  - President –
    1. Ely Ould Mohamed Vall, President of Mauritania (2005–2007)
    2. Sidi Ould Cheikh Abdallahi, President of Mauritania (2007–2008)
  - Prime Minister –
    1. Sidi Mohamed Ould Boubacar, Prime Minister of Mauritania (2005–2007)
    2. Zeine Ould Zeidane, Prime Minister of Mauritania (2007–2008)
- Mauritius
  - President – Sir Anerood Jugnauth, President of Mauritius (2003–2012)
  - Prime Minister – Dr. Navin Ramgoolam, Prime Minister of Mauritius (2005–2014)
- Morocco
  - King – Mohammed VI, King of Morocco (1999–present)
  - Prime Minister –
    1. Driss Jettou, Prime Minister of Morocco (2002–2007)
    2. Abbas El Fassi, Prime Minister of Morocco (2007–2011)
- Mozambique
  - President – Armando Guebuza, President of Mozambique (2005–2015)
  - Prime Minister – Luísa Diogo, Prime Minister of Mozambique (2004–2010)
- Namibia
  - President – Hifikepunye Pohamba, President of Namibia (2005–2015)
  - Prime Minister – Nahas Angula, Prime Minister of Namibia (2005-2012)
- Niger
  - President – Mamadou Tandja, President of Niger (1999–2010)
  - Prime Minister –
    1. Hama Amadou, Prime Minister of Niger (2000–2007)
    2. Seyni Oumarou, Prime Minister of Niger (2007–2009)
- Nigeria
  - President –
    1. Olusegun Obasanjo, President of Nigeria (1999–2007)
    2. Umaru Musa Yar'Adua, President of Nigeria (2007–2010)
- Rwanda
  - President – Paul Kagame, President of Rwanda (2000–present)
  - Prime Minister – Bernard Makuza, Prime Minister of Rwanda (2000–2011)
- Sao Tome and Principe
  - President – Fradique de Menezes, President of Sao Tome and Principe (2003–2011)
  - Prime Minister – Tomé Vera Cruz, Prime Minister of Sao Tome and Principe (2006–2008)
- Senegal
  - President – Abdoulaye Wade, President of Senegal (2000–2012)
  - Prime Minister –
    1. Macky Sall, Prime Minister of Senegal (2004–2007)
    2. Cheikh Hadjibou Soumaré, Prime Minister of Senegal (2007–2009)
- Seychelles
  - President – James Michel, President of Seychelles (2004–2016)
- Sierra Leone
  - President –
    1. Ahmad Tejan Kabbah, President of Sierra Leone (1998–2007)
    2. Ernest Bai Koroma, President of Sierra Leone (2007–2018)
- Somalia
  - President – Abdullahi Yusuf Ahmed, President of Somalia (2004–2008)
  - Prime Minister –
    1. Ali Mohammed Ghedi, Prime Minister of Somalia (2004–2007)
    2. Salim Aliyow Ibrow, Prime Minister of Somalia (acting) (2007)
    3. Nur Hassan Hussein, Prime Minister of Somalia (2007–2009)
- South Africa
  - President – Thabo Mbeki, President of South Africa (1999–2008)
- Sudan
  - President – Omar al-Bashir, President of Sudan (1989–2019)
- Tanzania
  - President – Jakaya Kikwete, President of Tanzania (2005–2015)
  - Prime Minister – Edward Lowassa, Prime Minister of Tanzania (2005–2008)
- Togo
  - President – Faure Gnassingbé, President of Togo (2005–present)
  - Prime Minister –
    1. Yawovi Agboyibo, Prime Minister of Togo (2006–2007)
    2. Komlan Mally, Prime Minister of Togo (2007–2008)
- Tunisia
  - President – Zine El Abidine Ben Ali, President of Tunisia (1987–2011)
  - Prime Minister – Mohamed Ghannouchi, Prime Minister of Tunisia (1999–2011)
- Uganda
  - President – Yoweri Museveni, President of Uganda (1986–present)
  - Prime Minister – Apolo Nsibambi, Prime Minister of Uganda (1999–2011)
- Zambia
  - President – Levy Mwanawasa, President of Zambia (2002–2008)
- Zimbabwe
  - President – Robert Mugabe, President of Zimbabwe (1987–2017)

== International organisations ==
=== Other organizations ===
- ACP — European Union: The 14th ACP-EU Joint Parliamentary Assembly was held in Kigali, Rwanda in November. Resolutions on electoral processes in ACP and EU countries, healthcare and medicine, natural disasters and the situation in the Democratic Republic of Congo were adopted. In addition the Kigali Declaration for development-friendly Economic Partnership Agreements (EPA)s was voted for.

== Health ==
=== Basketball ===
- Basketball at the 2007 All-Africa Games

== See also ==
- 2007 in Kenya
- 2007 in Sierra Leone
- 2007 in South Africa
- 2007 in Zimbabwe
- List of state leaders in 2007 § Africa

== Notes ==
This text is being translated from the original French-language article.
