= 2007–2008 Kenyan crisis =

Inter-ethnic violence in Kenya after disputed presidential election

- Part of the aftermath of the 2007 Kenyan presidential election
- Date: December 27, 2007 – February 28, 2008 (2 months and 1 day)
- Location: Kenya
- Caused by: 2007 Kenyan presidential election
- Result: Creation of coalition government

Parties
Party of National Unity	Orange Democratic Movement

Lead figures
Mwai Kibaki	Raila Odinga

Casualties and losses
- 800–1,500 killed 180,000–600,000–700,000 displaced

The 2007–2008 Kenyan crisis was a violent political, economic, and humanitarian crisis in Kenya. The crisis erupted after incumbent President Mwai Kibaki was declared the winner of the 2007 presidential election. Supporters of Kibaki's main opponent in that election, Raila Odinga of the Orange Democratic Movement, alleged electoral manipulation. This position was widely confirmed by international observers, as being perpetrated by both parties in the election. Even the head of the electoral commission himself confirmed that he did not know who had won the elections despite announcing the incumbent as president.

In part due to the ethnic and geographic diversity of Kenyan politics, no singular narrative can explain the reaction of opposition supporters to the announcement of Kibaki's swearing-in, which was done on December 30, 2007, at night. The opposition announced a mass protest against the official results, and the violence was largely stoked by the police. Raila Odinga encouraged supporters to engage in mass protests which he announced on local television and radio stations, most noticeably in Mombasa, Eldoret, Kericho, Kisumu, Nakuru and parts of Nairobi. Police shot hundreds of violent demonstrators, including a few in front of TV news cameras, causing more violence to erupt.

Targeted ethnic violence (as opposed to violent protests) escalated and at first was directed mainly against Kikuyu people—the community of which Kibaki is a member—living outside their traditional settlement areas, especially in the Rift Valley Province. The violence started with the murder of over 50 unarmed women and children, some as young as a month old, by locking them in a church and burning them alive in Kiambaa village in the outskirts of Eldoret Town, on New Year's Day. Tribal tensions in the Rift Valley region had resulted in violence in several previous Kenyan elections, most notably in the 1992 Kenyan Elections. This issue prompted Kikuyu Politicians and Businessmen to mobilise their youth popularly known as Mungiki to start killing Luos.

In Mombasa, the Kenyan coastal residents took to the streets to protest the electoral manipulations and support their preferred candidate. Tensions rose as the landless indigenous Coastal communities felt this was a time to avenge the grabbing of their land by mainly up-country Kikuyu. Looters also struck a number of stores in Mombasa. The slums of Nairobi saw some of the worst violence, some of it ethnically motivated, some expression of outrage at extreme poverty, and some the actions of criminal gangs. The violence continued sporadically for several months, particularly in the Rift Valley.

Former UN Secretary General Kofi Annan arrived in the country about a month after the election and successfully brought the two sides to the negotiating table. On February 28, 2008, Kibaki and Odinga signed a power-sharing agreement called the National Accord and Reconciliation Act 2008, which established the office of the Prime Minister and created a coalition government. The power-sharing Cabinet, headed by Odinga as Prime Minister, was eventually named on April 13, after lengthy negotiations over its composition; it was sworn in on April 17.

== Background ==
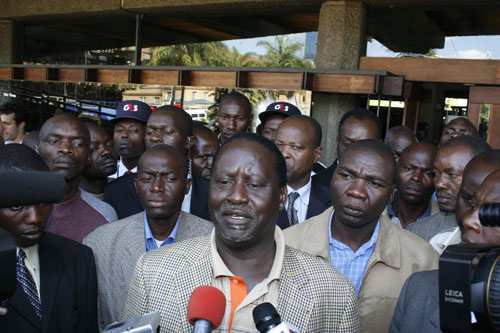
Orange Democratic Movement leader Raila Odinga speaks with Kenyan media

The post-election demonstration and violence stemmed from a mixture of motives. Some included:

- Voting in elections has widely been along ethnic lines in many Kenyan communities
- Widespread perception that the count of the presidential election was modified in favour of Kibaki
- During colonial times Kikuyu people were displaced from their fertile highlands and after independence they were settled outside their traditional areas especially in the Rift Valley, where the ethnic Maasai people had populated originally before Kenya's colonization by the British.
- A belief among members of several other tribes that the Kikuyu community in Kenya has dominated the country's political leadership since independence

Reports by international observers about manipulations and admissions by members of the Electoral Commission of Kenya that their staff provided them with incorrect figures have further fuelled this anger. The violence was directed mainly against Kikuyus, belonging to the same ethnic group as Kibaki.

The violence against Kikuyus occurred all over the country but was higher in areas like the Nairobi slums, Nyanza Province, the Rift Valley, and the Coast, where opposition against Kibaki was particularly strong. The ethnically diverse Nairobi slums have also seen violence by Kikuyu-dominated groups—amongst them the infamous Mungiki—against neighbours hailing from western parts of Kenya.

== Timeline ==
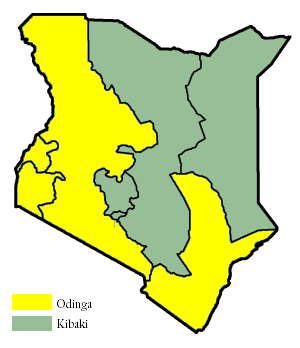
Map of Kenya, indicating majority per province for the two leading presidential candidates according to disputed official figures. Please note that the area size on the map does not indicate population density: the provinces to the East and North East are generally low population density provinces.

A BBC reporter saw 40 bodies with gunshot wounds in a mortuary in Kisumu, which was the opposition's main base. A witness also told them that armed police shot protesters at a rally. There were running battles in the Nairobi slums. The local KTN television station said that 124 people died nationwide in the first two days of unrest.

On December 31, 2007, police reported that 40 people were killed in Nairobi and 53 in Kisumu, a major support base for Odinga. Four bodies were discovered in Mathare, in Nairobi, seven people were killed in Nakuru, and four people found dead in a village near Kapsabet.

=== Disputed results ===
Early results tallied indicated that Odinga held a strong lead on December 28, the day after the election, and the ODM declared victory for Odinga on December 29; however, as more results were announced on the same day, the gap between the two candidates narrowed, and with almost 90% of the votes counted (180 out of 210 constituencies), Odinga's lead shrank to only 38,000 votes. At a press conference on the morning of December 30, Raila Amolo Odinga accused the government of fraud, urged Emilio Mwai Kibaki to concede defeat, and called for a recount. He said that the Orange Democratic Party would not take the matter to the courts claiming that the courts were controlled by Emilio Mwai Kibaki. The Electoral Commission declared Kibaki the winner on December 30, placing him ahead of Odinga by about 232,000 votes. According to Odinga, as many as 300,000 votes for Kibaki were falsely included in his total. The Chairman of the Electoral Commission, Samuel Kivuitu, said that while irregularities affecting the entire exercise did occur, they were a matter for the courts, not the Electoral Commission. Supporters of Kibaki, meanwhile, said that discrepancies had actually worked in Odinga's favor, arguing that discrepancies between polling station tallies and Electoral Commission results meant that Odinga had gained 53,000 votes while Kibaki had lost 106,000. Following the commission's declaration of his victory, Kibaki was promptly sworn in for his second term late in the evening on the same day, calling for the "verdict of the people" to be respected and for "healing and reconciliation" to begin.

Kivuitu said that there were some problems in the vote counting, noting that in one constituency the reported turnout rate was 115%. According to the European Union's head observer in the election, Alexander Graf Lambsdorff, the election was "flawed" and the Electoral Commission failed to establish "the credibility of the tallying process to the satisfaction of all parties and candidates"; he said that in some places EU observers were not allowed to see vote tallies until the Electoral Commission announced them: "the whole point...is to verify that the results are the same". The United Kingdom's Foreign Secretary, David Miliband, said that his country had "real concerns" about the election. While the United States initially congratulated Kibaki and called for the results to be respected, it also expressed concern, and on January 2, 2008, a spokesman for the U.S. State Department declined to confirm U.S. recognition of Kibaki's victory. In a telex from then US Embassy in Nairobi to the State Department in Washington DC [released in July 2012], US Ambassador Michael Ranneberger set out five scenarios as to who really won the election. He wrote, 'In all cases the margin of victory for either side is slim and ultimately unknowable'. The telex also noted that there was 'evidence of rigging on both sides' and Kivuitu said on January 2, that he had been pressured by PNU and ODM-K (Kibaki's and Kalonzo Musyoka's parties) into announcing the results without delay, and he claimed that he did not personally know who really won.

Within minutes of the commission's declaration of Kibaki as victor, tribe-based rioting and violence, primarily directed against Kikuyus, broke out across Kenya, and the government suspended live television coverage for some days. Odinga alleged that "a clique of people around Kibaki" sought to rig the election, but said that democracy "is unstoppable like the flow of the Nile". The ODM announced its intention to hold a ceremony on December 31, in which Odinga would be declared the "people's president", but police said that this could incite violence and that Odinga could be arrested if the ceremony occurred. Odinga then delayed this, but called for a million-strong rally on January 3, 2008 and for his supporters to wear black armbands as a show of mourning.

Odinga said that the ODM would not negotiate with Kibaki unless he resigned, because to do so would, according to Odinga, mean acknowledging Kibaki's legitimacy; he also said that, unless stopped, the "ruling clique" could rig the next election in five years as well, and that he was not afraid of being arrested, having been jailed many times in the past. For his part, Kibaki emphasized the importance of peace, stability, and tolerance in his 2008 New Year's message, speaking of the election as a concluded event and warning that law-breakers would be punished.

=== Rallies ===
Odinga said that the million-strong rally in his support planned for January 3 would take place in spite of a government ban, and he accused the government of being directly responsible for "genocide". Electoral Commission Chairman Kivuitu said on January 1, that he had been pressured by the PNU and ODM-Kenya to announce results immediately, despite the urgings of Western ambassadors to delay the results so that concerns about irregularities could be addressed.

On January 3, opposition supporters attempted to gather for the planned rally in Uhuru Park, but police fought them off with tear gas and water cannons. Another attempt to hold the rally was planned for January 4. Also on January 3, Kibaki said that he was willing to engage in dialogue "once the country is calm", and he described the continuing violence as "senseless", while Attorney General Amos Wako called for a recount, an investigation into the election, and the formation of a national unity government, saying that the situation was "quickly degenerating into a catastrophe of unimaginable proportions". Finance Minister Amos Kimunya said that if the ODM did not allege fraud, that would make it easier for the two sides to talk; Kimunya also said that the government wanted to mediate through Kenyan elders and did not want international mediation involving the African Union. KANU's Uhuru Kenyatta said that it might be possible for the two sides to work together, but that the ODM's position that Kibaki should resign before any talks took place was unacceptable, because then there would be "no government".

On January 4, ODM Secretary-General Anyang Nyongo called for a new presidential election to be held, without the involvement of the Electoral Commission. Government spokesman Alfred Mutua said that this would be possible only if it was decided by the courts.

After meeting U.S. Assistant Secretary of State Jendayi Frazer, Kibaki said on January 5, that he was willing to form a national unity government, but Odinga, who also met with Frazer, rejected this, saying that Kibaki "should not come to the negotiating table as the president" and calling for the creation of a transitional government leading to a new election in three to six months. However, after Odinga met with Frazer for a second time shortly afterward, Odinga's spokesman said that the ODM would not demand that Kibaki resign or admit defeat if he accepted an international mediator. At about the same time, while violence continued, it was reported to be decreasing in Nairobi.

=== Kufuor mediation ===
On January 6, Odinga called for rallies to be held on January 8, despite the government's insistence that the rallies would be illegal. Odinga's spokesman said that while the ODM ruled out a government of national unity, it could discuss "a coalition government with genuine power sharing" (which it said would leave less power for Kibaki than would be the case in a national unity government) or establishing an interim government to hold a new election. Odinga subsequently cancelled the rallies planned for January 8, saying that the mediation process, facilitated by Ghanaian President and African Union Chairman John Kufuor, was about to begin, with Kibaki having officially invited Kufuor, and that negotiations needed to take place in a peaceful atmosphere. Odinga said that he anticipated direct talks involving both himself and Kibaki, with Kufuor's participation. Foreign Minister Raphael Tuju said that by calling off the rallies, Odinga opened the way for negotiation and reconciliation.

There exist doubts that Kibaki really invited Kufuor (as opposed to him having come as a result of international concern for the worsening situation in Kenya). PNU members of parliament, newly appointed cabinet ministers and even the government spokesman, Dr Alfred Mutua, are known to have said Kufuor "was coming to take tea", and not to "negotiate with the warring factions regarding the elections"; this was captured both on TV and print media. In addition, the PNU side was actively downplaying the seriousness of the post-election crisis, saying that this was a local problem that would be dealt with locally. It even urged the displaced people at various police stations and camps to 'return home' and generally tried to dissuade international attention to the crisis. It is also worth noting that there were conflicting reports from Ghanaian weblogs about President Kufuor's visit. Some weblogs said he was not going to travel to Kenya, since the government did not view him as a welcome visitor, others saying he was required by his official responsibility as AU chairman to try to resolve the crisis in Kenya. Just before Kufuor's travel to Kenya, Moses Wetang'ula, the new Minister for Foreign Affairs travelled to Ghana to 'brief Mr. Kufuor' on the situation in Kenya, ahead of his trip to Kenya. These actions were perceived to be an indication of bad faith on the part of Kibaki and his team, and they preempted their bias against the talks between President Kibaki (and his PNU side) and Raila (and his ODM side). There were also indications that PNU did not want the discussion to be mediated by an outsider.

Odinga refused to accept Kibaki's offer to hold talks unless they took place as part of international mediation, saying that without having Kufuor present to mediate the talks would be a "sideshow" and a "public relations gimmick", and he claimed that Kibaki was using the offer of talks between himself and Odinga to divert attention from Kufuor. Meanwhile, Frazer said on January 7, that there had been rigging in the election, but she said that both sides could have engaged in rigging. She also previously said that Kenyans had "been cheated by their political leadership and their institutions".

Kibaki appointed 17 ministers as part of a new Cabinet on January 8, saying that the rest of the Cabinet would be appointed later. The Cabinet included the ODM-K's Kalonzo Musyoka as vice-president and Minister of Home Affairs and KANU's Uhuru Kenyatta as Minister of Local Government. Announcing these appointments, Kibaki said: "I have considered the importance of keeping the country united, peaceful and prosperous and a strong broad-based leadership." The ODM's Nyongo said that this Cabinet, in which the ODM was not included, was illegitimate because Kibaki did not win the election. Renewed outbreaks of violence were reported following Kibaki's announcement. With almost half of the Cabinet yet to be named, it was suggested that Kibaki intended to leave the remaining ministries open so that they would be available for the ODM following the negotiations; however, it was also noted that the most important ministries were already filled. Musalia Mudavadi, a leading figure in the ODM, denounced Kibaki's announcement as being intended only to sabotage mediation with Kufuor. The Daily Nation said that Kibaki's move would "be seen as a sign of bad faith" and that it could "poison the atmosphere". U.S. State Department spokesman Sean McCormack said that it appeared Kibaki was setting up a fait accompli, that the U.S. was "disappointed" by the move, and that it had "expressed its displeasure".

=== Annan mediation ===
On January 9, Kufuor met separately with Kibaki and Odinga. Government statements on that day emphasized Kibaki's commitment to dialogue and said that he had "already initiated a process of dialogue with other Kenyan leaders". Kibaki also gave a speech in which he said that the vote was concluded, that it was impossible to change the outcome, and that any complaints should be handled through the courts. The two sides agreed to "an immediate cessation of violence as well as any acts which may be detrimental to finding a peaceful solution to the ongoing crisis", but the talks otherwise failed when, according to Nyongo, Kibaki refused to sign an agreement (which was already signed by ODM representatives) presented to him by Kufuor that would have provided for an interim coalition government and an inquiry into the Electoral Commission; the government, however, blamed Odinga for the failure of the talks, saying that he was not responsive to Kibaki's offer of dialogue. Kufuor left Kenya on January 10, saying that both parties had agreed to continue talks together with former United Nations Secretary-General Kofi Annan and "a panel of eminent African personalities"; Annan's office subsequently said that he would lead future talks but that he was not likely to go to Kenya before January 15,. Kibaki's new Cabinet ministers were sworn in on January 10,.

On January 11, the ODM called for mass rallies to be held in about 30 places in the following week; the police said that the rallies were banned. Nyongo also called for international sanctions against Kibaki's government. On January 12, the EU said that there could not be "business as usual in Kenya" without a compromise and a solution to the dispute, and Frazer also said that the US could not conduct "business as usual in Kenya" under the circumstances, saying that Kibaki and Odinga should meet in person, "without preconditions", and that both sides "should acknowledge serious irregularities in the vote tallying which made it impossible to determine with certainty the final result". In addition, she called for the lifting of the bans on live television coverage and rallies.

Roads and Public Works Minister John Michuki said on January 14, that Annan was not coming at the government's invitation and reiterated the claim that Kibaki won the election. EU Development Commissioner Louis Michel said on the same day that EU aid to Kenya could be reduced as a result of the election. Parliament opened on January 15, and Annan was expected to arrive on the same day. ODM Members of Parliament said that they intended to sit on the government side in Parliament, asserting their claim to have won the election. They took the opposition side, however, with Odinga taking the Leader of the Opposition's seat. Although the ODM wanted an open ballot instead of a secret one in the election for the Speaker of Parliament, the government side opposed this and the vote was conducted through secret ballot. In the first round of voting, the ODM's candidate for Speaker, Kenneth Marende, received 104 votes and the government's candidate, Francis ole Kaparo, received 99 votes; in the second round Marende received 104 votes and Kaparo received 102. Although a two-thirds majority was required in the first two rounds, subsequently only a simple majority was required, and Marende was elected in the third round with 105 votes against 101 for Kaparo. Meanwhile, it was announced that Annan's visit would be delayed for a few days because he had fallen ill with the flu. In Nairobi threats and killings were carried out against the Asian and white Kenyan minorities by the banned ethnic sect Mungiki, which prompted a temporary exodus of the minority groups, until their protection was guaranteed by the government, prompting further economic hardship in the country.

The ODM's planned protests, intended to last for three days, began on January 16,. Police met the protests with force and prevented them from reaching Uhuru Park in Nairobi; protests also took place in other parts of the country, including Kisumu and Eldoret. At least two people were reported killed in Kisumu as police used live ammunition against the protesters, along with tear gas. Odinga, in an interview with BBC's HARDtalk, responded to Justice Minister Martha Karua's earlier claim that the ODM had planned "ethnic cleansing" by saying that her accusation was "outrageous" and that the violence perpetrated by his supporters was a reaction to the actions of the police, who he said had been ordered to shoot "members of certain ethnic communities". The protests continued on January 17, with police continuing to use force against them. Government spokesman Alfred Mutua said that the government would not be swayed by the threats of development partners to withdraw aid. A train was looted in Kibera by residents due to shortages caused by the crisis. Odinga alleged that police killed seven people in Nairobi, while the police spokesman, Eric Kiraithe, said that the police were acting lawfully and were showing restraint because the protesters were being "used by politicians". The ODM said that after the last day of protest on January 18, it would focus on boycotting companies controlled by Kibaki's allies. By January 18, at least 22 people were reported to have been killed in the three-day protests, with the last day seeing the most deaths. The protests were considered to be substantially diminished in strength compared to those in late December. On January 19, despite the ODM's earlier announcement that it would cease protests, it said that protests would resume on January 24.

=== Boycott and further violence ===
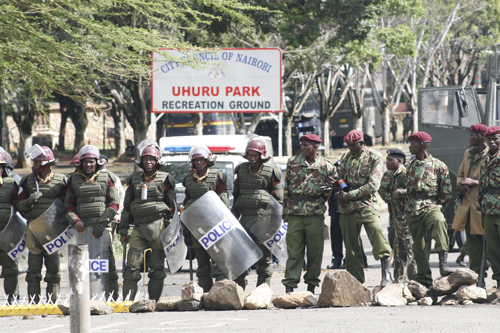
Police cordon off Uhuru Park to bar opposition from holding a mass protest rally

Further violence in Nairobi and the Rift Valley followed the protests. On January 21, Minister of State for Internal Security George Saitoti warned against further protests, saying that they would only be "an opportunity for criminals to loot and commit other crimes" and that "illegal acts will be dealt with accordingly". The government also said in reference to the opposition's planned boycott that it was illegal to "sabotage" businesses. The businesses targeted for the boycott included Equity Bank, Brookside Dairies, CityHoppa, and Kenya Bus; it was speculated that the boycott would not have a substantial impact and that many Kenyans would find it too impractical to observe. Foreign Minister Moses Wetangula, in reaction to criticism from the United Kingdom, summoned the UK's High Commissioner to complain, and he said that "our elections don't need a stamp of authority from the House of Commons". Annan arrived in Kenya on January 22.

On January 23, the ODM held a memorial service in Nairobi for victims of the violence, at which Odinga said that tribes should not fight because "this is a war between the people of Kenya and a very small bloodthirsty clique clinging to power". Meanwhile, police fired tear gas at some of his supporters outside; some tear gas affected the mourning service, dispersing it. The state-owned telecommunications building was attacked and set on fire. On the same day, Kibaki and Odinga met separately with Ugandan President Yoweri Museveni, and according to Museveni's press secretary an agreement was reached in principle to establish a judicial commission that would investigate the accusations of vote rigging; however, the two sides disagreed as to whether the government alone should appoint the members of the commission. Museveni was also said to have proposed a power-sharing deal, which was rejected by the government on the grounds that it was unwilling to share power with the ODM due to the latter's alleged responsibility for the killing of innocent people. Annan also met with Odinga, and the latter agreed to cancel the protests that were to have been held the next day.

=== Beginning of talks, killing of MPs ===
Kibaki and Odinga met for the first time since the crisis began on January 24, together with Annan. Annan called the meeting "very encouraging", saying that it represented "the first steps towards a peaceful solution of the problem". Kibaki and Odinga both said after the meeting that they were working towards a solution and urged the people to be peaceful. On January 25, Odinga said in an interview that a power-sharing deal was out of the question, and that the only possibilities acceptable to him were that Kibaki resign or that a new election be held. Responding to a claim by Human Rights Watch that ODM leaders were orchestrating violence, he said that the people were reacting spontaneously. As violence continued in the Rift Valley, Annan asked both sides to designate negotiators by January 29.

Meanwhile, serious violence broke out in Nakuru on January 24–25, apparently as a reaction to Kibaki describing himself as the "duly elected president" after meeting in person with Odinga. Kikuyus were attacked and a number of buildings were set on fire, along with Nakuru's only fire engine; at least 12 deaths were reported. Another town, Total Station, was half-destroyed in violence between Kikuyus and Kalenjin, with at least two deaths reported, and as many as 50,000 people fled from violence near Molo. By January 27, at least 55 people had been killed in Nakuru, along with at least five in Kaptembwa and Sewage, two slums near Nakuru, while at least nine deaths were reported in Naivasha, where Kikuyus set Luo homes on fire. By January 28, at least 64 people had been killed in Nakuru and at least 22 in Naivasha; 19 of the deaths in Naivasha occurred when Kikuyus set fire to a place where Luos had fled for safety. ODM chairperson Henry Kosgei accused the government of facilitating the killing in Nakuru by imposing a curfew, which he said was used "to keep some groups indoors to be killed", on January 28.

Mugabe Were, an ODM Member of Parliament, was shot and killed early on January 29, 2008. Renewed protests and violence followed his death. Addressing the National Assembly before beginning talks, Annan called for an end to the "downward spiral into chaos that is threatening this beautiful country." The talks then began, although they were delayed by 90 minutes due to disputed seating arrangements. Annan said that resolution of short-term issues might occur in four weeks, although he thought deeper talks might continue for a year.

Another ODM MP, David Kimutai Too, was shot and killed by a policeman in Eldoret on January 31, 2008. Police said the killing was related to a love triangle involving him, the officer who shot him, and a female officer, but the ODM called it an assassination, accusing the government of seeking to reduce the number of ODM Members of Parliament, and protests and violence broke out. The talks were postponed until the next day due to the killing.

=== Continued negotiations, signing of power-sharing agreement ===
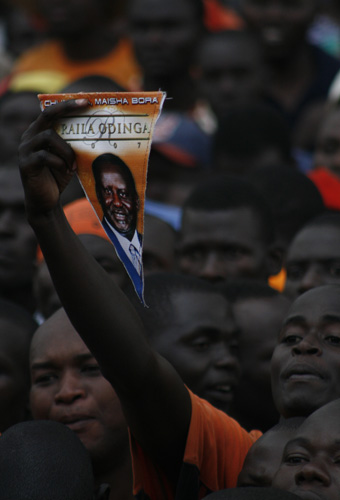
ODM supporters at a political rally during the crisis

UN Secretary-General Ban Ki-moon arrived in Kenya for a visit to assist the talks on February 1. During the same day, Annan announced that the two rival leaders had agreed on an agenda for peace talks, which included both short-term and long-term goals. The talks would last a month and would include the topics of ending the violence, the humanitarian situation, resolving the political crisis, and land and historical injustices. Annan said that he believed the first three of these four points could be resolved within seven to 15 days, and he said that an agreement had been reached on 18 measures to end the violence, including the demobilization of gangs and ceasing speeches and text messages that incite hatred and violence. Violence nevertheless continued; on the next day at least 20 people were reported to have been killed since the agreement. On February 3, Odinga called for African Union peacekeepers to be sent to Kenya.

South Africa's Cyril Ramaphosa was unanimously chosen by Annan's team as chief mediator to lead long-term talks, but the government had concerns about Ramaphosa's involvement, saying that he and Odinga had business links. Ramaphosa consequently withdrew from the talks and Annan accepted his withdrawal on February 4,. Odinga said on the same day that the ODM would withdraw from the talks if a deal was not reached, and he said that his party wanted a new presidential election to be held within three months, with a new electoral commission and the same voter register. The alternative possibility of a transitional coalition government, in which a new position of Prime Minister would be created for Odinga and Kibaki's power would be reduced, was something Odinga said he could consider, although it was not the option he preferred.

Opposing plans for a meeting of foreign ministers from the countries of the East African Intergovernmental Authority on Development (IGAD) in Kenya, Nyongo said that the ODM would hold protests if the meeting went ahead, believing that the meeting would be a means to legitimize Kibaki's government. Annan was critical of this threat, saying that "provocative statements outside negotiations" were supposed to be avoided. The government subsequently said that the meeting would not officially be considered an IGAD meeting, and the ODM called off the protests on February 6.

On February 7, the two sides remained deeply divided in talks, although they agreed that there should not be a recount of votes. Annan said that he was "totally opposed to a re-election in this climate", referring to the persistent violence. Meanwhile, the United Nations Security Council called for peaceful resolution of the dispute through negotiations, the United States imposed a travel ban on ten unnamed Kenyans (a move that was praised by Kibaki's government), and a policeman, Edward Kirui, was arrested for allegedly shooting two protesters to death in Kisumu on January 16.

Progress in the talks was reported on February 8, with Annan saying that both sides had agreed on the need for a political settlement and that he hoped talks on point three (the resolution of the political crisis) could be concluded early in the next week. The ODM's William Ruto said that although there was progress, a solution had still not been reached, and he denied that a national unity government had been agreed upon; Mutula Kilonzo, a negotiator for the government, reported "excellent" progress. Saitoti, the Internal Security Minister, announced the end of the ban on rallies on the same day due to improved security, but said that rallies must be held only for peaceful purposes.

Despite the reported progress and his earlier adoption of a more conciliatory tone, Odinga returned to a hard-line stance on February 9, repeating his earlier demand that Kibaki should either resign or a new election should be held, and he said that he would not compromise on that point. Speaking before the National Assembly on February 12, Annan said that both sides in the talks had agreed to set up "an independent review committee that will be mandated to investigate all aspects of the 2007 presidential election". He also said that both sides in the National Assembly would have to work together to pass legislation needed to resolve the crisis. On the same day, as talks approached a potential agreement, talks were moved to a secret location, with Annan requesting a "complete news blackout" and asking participants in the talks to not disclose what was under discussion. Ruto said that the ODM had proposed forming a government in which the two sides would share power for two years before a new election. Although Annan suggested that the two sides had agreed to a two-year power-sharing transitional government, the government objected, with the Justice Minister, Martha Karua, saying that this suggestion had misrepresented and undermined the government's position. On February 13, the mediators said in a statement that Annan had only expressed his own perspective and that he had not meant to suggest that the two sides had formally agreed on the proposal.

As talks adjourned on February 14, scheduled to resume the following week, government negotiator Kilonzo said that an agreement had been reached to restart the process of writing a new constitution after it had stalled following the failure of the 2005 constitutional referendum. On February 15, Annan said that the two sides had agreed to a range of reforms, including the improvement of electoral laws and human rights, as well as a review of the constitution, although they had yet to agree upon the composition of a power-sharing government. It was reported that the government side wanted Kibaki to retain strong executive powers, while the opposition wanted Odinga to have extensive powers in a new position of Prime Minister. According to Annan, they were about to take "the last difficult and frightening step" to conclude a deal, and he said that he intended to remain in Kenya until a new government was in place, by which time he thought the process would be "irreversible". The commission charged with reviewing the election was to be established by March 15, with a report to follow within three to six months.

U.S. Secretary of State Condoleezza Rice arrived in Kenya to support the talks on February 18. Meanwhile, Foreign Minister Wetangula said that help was welcome but he stressed that ultimately the problem had to be solved by Kenyans and that no one should make the "mistake of putting a gun to anybody's head and saying 'either/or'" in an attempt to force a solution. Rice met with Kibaki, Odinga, and Annan, and she emphasized the importance of reaching a settlement, saying that one should have already been in place; however, she also said that the U.S. was not trying to "dictate a solution to Kenyans".

On February 19, Kibaki said that, while he was willing to share power in the government, an agreement should be made in the context of the existing constitution. Nyongo then called for the National Assembly to be summoned within a week "to enact the necessary changes in the constitution to implement these mediation proposals", warning that the ODM would otherwise resume protests. On February 21, Mutula Kilonzo said that the government side had accepted "the creation of the post of a non-executive prime minister with substantial responsibilities", but the opposition wanted the prime minister to be a head of government with executive powers. Nyongo said that he thought an agreement would be reached by the next day.

On February 21, East African Community Secretary-General Juma Mwapachu said that the crisis was having a negative effect on the regional economy. Speaking in Nairobi on February 22, newly elected Chairman of the African Union Commission Jean Ping said it was hoped that an agreement would be reached by the next week.

An impasse was reached on February 25, 2008. While both parties agreed to the creation of the post of prime minister, they disagreed about the powers the newly created post should have, over government posts and over a possible election in case the coalition should split. Annan declared the talks suspended on February 26, saying that they had "not broken down" but that the leaders needed to "become directly engaged in these talks". Mutula Kilonzo said that media reports of supposed deals had caused problems and complained of unfair pressure. The ODM's Mudavadi expressed frustration at the situation.

Jakaya Kikwete, the President of Tanzania and Chairman of the African Union, arrived in Kenya on February 27, to assist in the talks. On the same day, Odinga said that the ODM had decided not to resume protests as planned on February 28, expressing continued commitment to the talks.

On February 28, Kibaki and Odinga signed the agreement meant to end the crisis at a ceremony in Nairobi; Annan said that the agreement was to be known as the National Accord and Reconciliation Act. The two leaders agreed to form a coalition government, with Odinga set to receive the new position of Prime Minister, in which capacity he was to "coordinate and supervise government affairs"; it remained unclear whether, as Prime Minister, he could still be overruled by Kibaki. According to the agreement, the Prime Minister must be an elected member of the National Assembly as well as the parliamentary leader of the party or coalition holding a majority of seats in the National Assembly. The agreement also provided for two Deputy Prime Ministers, one for each of the two parties, while the allotment of Cabinet portfolios was to reflect the relative strength of the respective parties in the National Assembly. The Prime Minister and the Deputy Prime Ministers can only be removed from their positions if they lose a no-confidence vote in the National Assembly. Kibaki said that he would reconvene the National Assembly on March 6, so that it could make the constitutional changes needed in order to implement the agreement.

=== Implementation of the agreement ===
Annan left Kenya on March 2, leaving Oluyemi Adeniji, a former Nigerian Foreign Minister, to lead talks on remaining issues, such as land, political reforms, and the uneven distribution of wealth between various ethnic groups. On 3, March 13, people were killed in an attack near Mount Elgon that was attributed by police to the Sabaot Land Defence Force. Kibaki and Odinga met again on March 4, as part of the follow-up negotiations. Odinga said that this meeting was "very productive". On March 6, rights groups including Reporters Without Borders stated that the Kenyan media played a positive role during the violence despite being inexperienced with such situations.

Speaking in the National Assembly when it convened on March 6, Kibaki urged it to quickly pass the legislation required to implement the power-sharing agreement; he said that the people were watching and that they wanted to see "pragmatic solutions, not ideological posturing". He named four bills that the National Assembly needed to pass: the National Accord and Reconciliation Bill, a bill amending the constitution, a bill establishing the truth, justice and reconciliation commission, and a bill dealing with ethnic issues.

On March 9–10, the army attacked the Sabaot Land Defence Force near Mount Elgon; this attack included aerial bombardment. 30,000 people were reported to have fled from the army's attack, although this number was disputed and the army said that it was "not intimidating or harassing residents".

On March 10, Francis Muthaura, the head of the public service, stirred controversy by saying that Kibaki would remain both head of state and head of government and that Odinga would only rank third in the government, after Kibaki and Vice-president Musyoka. Government negotiator Kilonzo and Foreign Minister Wetangula backed this interpretation of the agreement, with the latter saying that "we are not setting up a government within a government". The ODM, however, angrily rejected Muthaura's interpretation. William Ruto said that "Kenyans should treat Mr Muthaura's statement with the contempt it deserves" and that it was "uncalled for, unnecessary and contemptuous of the agreement". ODM spokesman Salim Lome said that it was unacceptable to have Odinga ranking third, as "a minor hanger-on", and that the ODM would never have agreed to such an arrangement.

On March 11, a parliamentary committee made a request for the bills implementing the agreement to be fast-tracked, which would provide for them to be considered within five days, rather than two weeks. The National Assembly passed two bills implementing the agreement on March 18,. The first of these was the Constitution of Kenya (Amendment) Bill, which passed unanimously with 200 votes in favor; this constitutionally established the posts of Prime Minister and Deputy Prime Minister. The amendment was followed by a law providing for those posts in a new government and detailing the terms of the power-sharing arrangement. Kibaki signed the bills into law a few hours later. He said that he was "now confident a permanent solution to the crisis will be achieved" and called for the drafting of a new constitution; meanwhile, Odinga called for a "national ethnic conference where we will have representatives from all the 42 tribes in the country come together to discuss openly how we want to lead this country".

As part of consultations on the composition of the new Cabinet, the ODM proposed a Cabinet with 34 members (twice the number in the partial Cabinet named by Kibaki in January), while the government proposed a Cabinet with 44 members. On April 1, a protest of about 100 people was held in Nairobi against these proposals on the grounds that it was unaffordable to have so many ministers and that having them would not serve a constructive purpose; the protesters demanded that the Cabinet be limited to no more than 24 members. This protest was broken up by police with tear gas. In a statement on April 2, Annan expressed concerns about the length of time that it was taking to name a new Cabinet. He urged Kibaki and Odinga to put the national interest first, conclude consultations, and name a Cabinet with an equal division of power in line with the agreement.

On April 3, the two sides announced that they had reached an agreement on the size and composition of the Cabinet. According to a statement from Kibaki's office, the new Cabinet would have 40 ministers, would be announced on April 6, and would be sworn in on April 12. This Cabinet would be the largest in Kenya's history, and the announcement of its size was greeted with substantial dissatisfaction among the people, with many believing a 40-member Cabinet to be wasteful, unnecessary, and intended merely to provide additional jobs with which to reward politicians. The government argued that the large size of the Cabinet was needed in order for it to be properly inclusive. Alfred Mutua, the government spokesman, said that "there is no price that is too high for our country to ensure peace, harmony and reconciliation, healing and stability that will spur and grow the economy and create even more wealth", and he suggested that the cost would not be as great as anticipated because "most of the new ministries are subdivided from formerly existing ministries and therefore the budget and members of staff for those new ministries already exist."

On April 5, the day before the Cabinet was to be announced, the ODM said that the announcement had been delayed because there was still disagreement on the allotment of ministerial portfolios. The disagreement reportedly hinged on the particularly important portfolios of finance, local government, energy, and internal security. According to the government, the finance, defence, foreign affairs, and justice portfolios were to go to Kibaki's party, the PNU, while the ODM was to receive the roads, public works, tourism, and agriculture portfolios. Mutua said that Odinga had not submitted his list of proposed ministers to Kibaki, and he said that Kibaki had invited Odinga for talks on the morning of April 6,. Kibaki and Odinga accordingly met, and afterwards they said in a joint statement that they had made "substantial progress" and that they expected an agreement to be reached in further talks on April 7. However, on April 8, the talks were suspended due to the continued disagreement; according to Nyongo, they were suspended "until [the PNU] fully recognises the 50/50 power-sharing arrangement and the principle of portfolio balance". Odinga said that he had received a letter from the PNU, which asserted that "the constitution grants the president exclusive executive powers to run his country on his own and ... his powers supersede the provisions of the accord". Meanwhile, a protest in Kibera was broken up by police with tear gas; this was the largest protest to occur since the agreement was signed.

It was reported on April 12, that Kibaki and Odinga had reached an agreement on the Cabinet and that it would be announced on the next day. Accordingly, the Cabinet, with 40 ministers and 50 assistant ministers, was named on April 13; there were 20 ministers each for PNU and the ODM. The PNU was considered to have kept most of the main portfolios despite the dispute that led to the delay, and some in the ODM complained that because of this there was not a true balance in portfolios. The PNU took portfolios such as foreign affairs, finance, internal security, defence, and energy, while the ODM took portfolios such as local government, agriculture, immigration, roads, and public works. Odinga was named Prime Minister, Uhuru Kenyatta was named as the PNU's Deputy Prime Minister (as well as Minister of Trade), and Musalia Mudavadi was named as the ODM's Deputy Prime Minister (as well as Minister of Local Government). Kibaki challenged politicians to put politics aside and "get to work".

Odinga and the Cabinet were sworn in on April 17, 2008, at State House. Annan travelled to Kenya again for the occasion; he called on Kenyans to support the new Cabinet and, noting that there was "still a long way to go", said that the next task would be to "mould the cabinet as a cohesive, effective and productive thing that will help steer this nation right".

=== After the formation of the unity government ===
In the absence of an opposition due to the formation of the coalition government, more than 70 backbencher MPs supported the creation of a coalition opposition, feeling that it was important to have an opposition for the sake of democratic governance. However, on May 22, 2008, the Cabinet decided to oppose the creation of such an opposition, saying that it would be unconstitutional and would violate the spirit of the coalition. On the same day, the Cabinet decided to fast-track the commission of inquiry that was intended to investigate the causes of the violence. A proposed bill that would allow the backbenchers to create an official opposition (the National Assembly (Parliamentary Opposition) Bill 2008) was published in August 2008 and was passed a few months later.

In addition to the two vacancies in Parliament created by the killing of ODM MPs Mugabe Were and David Too, results were never announced in two parliamentary constituencies due to violence, and another vacancy was produced by the election of Kenneth Marende as Speaker of Parliament. The five by-elections to fill these seats were to be held on June 11, 2008. During the campaigning for the by-elections, which concluded on June 9, the politics of ethnicity was again evident, causing anxiety among some observers; increased tension was also evident between the PNU and the ODM. The ODM alleged that some PNU ministers were guilty of "openly bribing voters, intimidating ODM supporters and misusing state resources", and ODM minister William Ole Ntimama said that his party "watched with dismay as our coalition partners sink to new lows without any regard for the consequences which may flow". The issue of a possible amnesty for those arrested in connection with the violence also proved to be controversial. Vice-president Musyoka downplayed the tension, saying that campaigning had "not interfered in any way with the smooth operations of the coalition".

On June 10, 2008, two ministers—Minister of Roads Kipkalya Kones and Assistant Minister of Home Affairs Lorna Laboso—were killed in a plane crash, leaving another two seats vacant.

== Casualties and displacement ==
By January 28, the death toll from the violence was at around 1,300. Up to 600,000 people have been displaced. The largest single loss of life was when a church providing shelter from the violence to 200 people was set on fire by rioters, killing 35 people. The people who were sheltering were members of President Kibaki's tribe, the Kikuyu.

Former Olympic athlete Lucas Sang died under unknown circumstances in a riot at Eldoret on January 1. Politician G. G. Njuguna Ngengi was hacked to death in Kuresoi, near Molo, on January 2. Marathon runner Wesley Ngetich Kimutai died after he was shot with an arrow on January 19, in the Trans Mara District, becoming the second international athlete to lose his life. On January 20, Donald Odanga, former basketball international was fatally wounded by a stray police bullet. On January 29, opposition MP Mugabe Were was shot to death on his driveway, and on January 31, another opposition MP, David Kimutai Too, was shot by a policeman in disputed circumstances.

On January 13, Human Rights Watch accused the police of having a "shoot to kill" policy, using live ammunition against protesters and looters. According to the police, they have shot looters but not protesters. On January 18, police spokesman Eric Kiraithe said that 510 people had been killed in the violence and that 82 of them were killed by police. According to Kiraithe, the police were acting lawfully and were showing restraint because the protesters were being "used by politicians."

Later in January, Human Rights Watch accused "ODM politicians and local leaders" of organizing, instigating and facilitating violence against Kikuyus. The BBC reported on March 5, that government officials had met with members of the Mungiki militia, which is banned, at State House to arrange for the militia to protect Kikuyus. The government denied this.

== Aftermath ==
=== Regional implications ===
The violence in Kenya has had serious economic ramifications throughout East Africa, particularly for the landlocked countries of the Great Lakes region (Uganda, Rwanda, Burundi, and eastern parts of the Democratic Republic of Congo). These countries depend upon Kenyan infrastructure links (particularly the port at Mombasa) for important imports as well as export routes. Significant shortages of gasoline were reported in Uganda as well as Zanzibar following the elections. The East African Community, despite having election observers in Kenya, did not issue a statement.

=== Reactions ===
A government spokesman claimed that Odinga's supporters were "engaging in ethnic cleansing". Odinga countered that Kibaki's camp was "guilty, directly, of genocide" as he called for international mediation.

=== Possible continuation ===
The UN had warned that a repeat of the problems could occur after the next election unless Kenya strengthens its institutions and the perpetrators of the 2007 violence are punished. A BBC report in 2009 found that rival groups in Rift Valley Province, such as the Kalenjin and Kikuyu, were purchasing firearms such as AK-47 and G3 rifles, in readiness for anticipated violence at the 2013 poll. There is, however, concerted efforts from the civil society to help avert such an eventuality. There is even a campaign dubbed The Wazi campaign, that aims to prevent the recurrence of the violence through the use of animated cartoon PSAs that preach peace. Despite these concerns, Kenya had a peaceful election in 2013 with a record 85.91% voter turnout. However, during the 2017 general elections there was an annulment of the results when the opposition leader pulled out.

== See also ==
- Ushahidi
- Mount Elgon insurgency
- Waki Commission
- Kriegler Commission
- 2009 Kenya sex strike
