= Mathira massacre =

Stonings and hackings of people in Kenya

Mathira Massacre
- Karatina (Kenya)
- Location: Karatina, Kenya
- Attack type: Stonings and hackings
- Weapons: Axes, clubs, machetes
- Deaths: At least 29
- Injuries: At least 3
- Perpetrator: Mungiki

The Mathira massacre was a sequence of unanticipated stonings and hackings which occurred in Karatina, Nyeri District, Central Province in Kenya on 21 April 2009. At least twenty-nine people are known to have died and three others were injured after fighting was reported between residents of the town and alleged members of the illegal Mungiki sect, described as Kenya's version of tribal sects. Police said the majority of the victims were of Mungiki affiliation.

== Background ==
The violence had been limited to the Kirinyaga District for one week but suddenly spread when the Mungiki launched an attack on a minibus (matatus), at a road block which had been set up in the Kagio area. They were seeking revenge for the deaths of fellow sect members in Kirinyaga, an act which had initiated the violence in the first place. The minibus was owned by a local operator and because he was targeted, some people went to Karatina to confront his suspected assailants.

The sect had been continually acquiring money which belonged to the town's populace and the residents resisted when they grew weary of it. Under threat of expulsion from the town by the Mungiki, they began to attack suspected members of the sect. The Mungiki resisted this attempt at vengeance by retaliating and engaging in open combat in local villages.

It is claimed that the massacre was planned and carried out in less than twelve hours. The attackers claim to have attended a burial in Mûragara village and upon encountering local hostility were provoked into defending themselves. Members of the sect crawled one by one through nearby tea bushes while some were housed by a member (Gakono) to hide in the forest before leaping out to attack. They claim to have had help from allies.

== Arrests ==
Police made attempts to calm the growing tensions. Thirty-seven people were taken into custody as a search got underway for others believed to have involved themselves in the incident. Items such as machetes were acquired by the police. Axes and clubs were also used. The streets were said to have been left covered in blood following the incident.
