= 2009 Kenya sex strike =

A sex strike, a form of nonviolent protest, was held by Kenyan female activists in 2009 to end the deteriorating relationship between the country's President, Mwai Kibaki, and Prime Minister, Raila Odinga, who agreed to share leadership powers in Kenya. There was a seven-day sex strike, which involved thousands of women and the wives of both the Prime Minister and President, who vowed to withhold sex from their partner. This sex strike was aimed at forcing the leaders to reconcile as they had different views on how Kenya should be run as well as issued conflicting policies that did not focus on urgent issues that mattered in Kenya such as dealing with corruption and poverty.

The goal of the strike was to revive Kenya and fix the bickering leadership. The women had a set of demands they wanted to be fulfilled which involved principles such as respect and good faith from the leaders. The strike lasted seven days, after which it ended with a joint prayer session where the conflicting leaders finally agreed to talk.

== Tribal violence ==
In 2009, Kenya was experiencing an enormous amount of post-election violence once the President and Prime Minister were appointed as leaders. This resulted in communal violence between tribes. Kenya had a disputed election that led to tribal conflict, which killed more than a thousand people and left more than six hundred thousand people homeless.

== Movement ==
The sex strike was enforced by a women's group called Women's Development Organization, a group in Kenya that is a prominent women's rights group. The Women's Development Organization group has been around for the longest in Kenya as a form of women's rights movements. Eleven other women's groups also joined the strike, eventually involving thousands of women. The movement was significant and caused a major challenge because many men in Kenya are polygamous, as it is allowed by law. The sex strike lasted a full week, from May 1, 2009, until May 7. The nonviolent action was the omission of sex by women from men and their husbands. The strike symbolized more than just a hope for cooperation between political leaders, but it also represented the radical progress for women's rights in that the women had the power to decide to withhold sex. Kenya is also very conservative so the fact that women could use sex in their strike and talk about it in public proves the changes and the extent that Kenyan women will go. The women's rights movement is still in its grassroots, but this strike did provide an increase in awareness for the movement.

The act of resisting sex was enough for the government to reconsider the leadership and how Kenya was being run.
