= John Paul Oulu =

Kenyan activist

George Paul Oulu also known as Oulu GPO (died March 5, 2009) was a Kenyan human rights activist and a former Vice Chairman of the Students Organization of Nairobi University (SONU); the representative student body at the University of Nairobi. His 2009 assassination is widely attributed to his work in documenting police killings.

== Human rights work ==
Oulu was credited with an important role in investigative work behind police killings in Kenya, including The Cry of Blood — Report on Extra-Judicial Killings and Disappearances, which was widely publicised by WikiLeaks.

== Assassination ==
At approximately 6:00 pm Oulu was shot and killed while sitting in rush hour traffic in Nairobi on March 5, 2009, along with lawyer and founder of the Oscar Foundation, Oscar Kamau Kingara. They were on their way to a meeting with Kamanda Mucheke, a senior human rights officer of the Kenya National Commission on Human Rights when they were shot at point-blank range in their white Mercedes Benz E200 car (KAJ 179Z).

Witness accounts from the nearby University of Nairobi stated that a Mitsubishi Pajero was seen blocking a Mercedes Benz, after which gunshots were fired at the Mercedes by individuals in similar clothing who emerged from a minivan positioned a few cars behind. The incident resulted in the fatal shooting of the two occupants.

Earlier on in the same day, the government through its spokesperson, Alfred Mutua, had accused the Oscar Foundation of sponsoring Mungiki led protests.

The assassination sparked protests by students from the nearby University of Nairobi that were marked with destruction and looting of property. Godwin Ogato, a second year university student at University of Nairobi was shot dead in the fracas that ensued between students and police.

Following the assassination, WikiLeaks called for witness reports and described Kingara and Oulu as "Wikileaks-related senior human rights activists". As per the leaks, it was alleged that they were executed by government undercover security officers.

== See also ==
- Human rights in Kenya
