= Prizm Project =

Human rights program

PRIZM project is a human rights education programme for young women. Four foundational pillars are used in teaching human rights to engaged young women: civic engagement, social justice, inner peace, and critical thinking. PRIZM runs Human Rights Retreats to give young women the necessary tools to become active in their communities to create positive social change. It also provides a toolkit for field organizers to use in running a retreat in their own area. The project is associated with the Global Literacy Project, and has worked with schools in the United States to collect books and other literacy materials to send to third-world schools.

== Activities ==
The Prizm Project organisation is active in South Africa and Kenya, as well as holding an annual retreat on the grounds of Douglass College at Rutgers University. The organisation celebrated its launch with a retreat attended by over a hundred young women in Kenya. Other education programmes are in place in Southeast Asia and in Bulgaria.
