= Charles Lugano =

Kenyan politician

Charles Lilechi Lugano (1950–2009) was a Kenyan politician. He belonged to the Orange Democratic Movement (ODM) and was elected to represent the Shinyalu Constituency in the National Assembly of Kenya since the 2007 Kenyan parliamentary election.

Lugano was educated at Matioli Primary School and later Lirhanda Mixed Primary School. He later joined Lodwar High school for O levels. After high school he moved to Kitale and worked for National Cereals and Produce Board and Kenya Seed Company. He also got a degree in accounting, after which he worked for Turkana Fisheries Co-operative Society, ending up as a general manager. Later he went to work for Kenya Red Cross Society. Lugano had two wives and several children. He died on 4 May 2009 at Nairobi Hospital after what was termed a short illness. Following his death, a by-election was held in August 2009, which was won by Justus Kizito of ODM, thus Lugano's party retained the seat.

He was widely known to help people not just in Shinyalu but the entire Kakamega area in charity ranging from transportation of the dead, school fees payment in high school, university and colleges and helping youth get employed. Lugano, popularly known as Mundu wa Bandu (A Man Of The People), won the Shinyalu parliamentary seat with the highest number of votes in the history of Shinyalu constituency since its inception from Ikolomani in 1988, trouncing MP Daniel Lyula Khamasi by over 20,000 votes.
