= Mighty King Kong =

- Birth name: Paul Otieno Imbaya
- Born: September 26, 1973; Siaya District, Kenya
- Died: December 25, 2007 (aged 34); Nairobi, Kenya
- Genres: Reggae; Rocksteady & Ska
- Occupation: Reggae Musician
- Instrument: Vocals
- Years active: 1999–2007
- Labels: Next Level Studios

Paul Otieno Imbaya (26 September 1973 – 25 December 2007), better known for his stage name Mighty King Kong, was a reggae musician from Kenya. He was born in Ugenya, Siaya District.

As a child he suffered severe polio attack and was disabled from the waist down. He went to Ambira Primary School, but dropped out at Standard Six following the death of his father. He moved to Kisumu city where he became a street kid and beggar.

In 1993 he moved to Nairobi. With the assistance of DJ Stone, a local deejay whom he had met in Kisumu, he was able to perform at Nairobi clubs on a weekly basis.

Few years later he moved to Mombasa and performed with bands like Them Mushrooms and Pressmen. Later on, he moved to Kampala, Uganda to perform with the popular Simba Ngoma band. In Kampala he earned enough money to record his first album. He went back to Nairobi where his album, titled Ladies Choice, was produced by Maurice Oyando, father of RV and radio host Tallia Oyando, of the Next Level studios. It was released in June 1999. His second album, Cinderella was released in 2001, again by Next Level studios.

His third album, Return of the King, was released in 2004. However, Mighty King Kong publicly blamed its contract of being exploitative. In 2007, he released a compilation album "The Best of King Kong".

Outside Kenya, he performed in Germany, Netherlands and South Africa.

Above all, he was a die-hard supporter of Raila Odinga's ODM political movement which had promised to nominate him to the next parliament to represent the disabled persons of Kenya. He was seen dressed in orange colours as a sign of firm commitment to the party in his last days.

== Discography ==
Album "The Best of the Mighty King Kong"

- R U ready?
- Cinderella Mama
- Right Direction
- African Leaders
- Give Me Your Love
- Man and Woman
- Stop Violence
- Wan Wadhi
- Life
- Ladies' Choice
- Mo' Rounds
- Oringo
- Celebration
- Cassanova Gal
- African Story

== Death ==
He died on Christmas Day, 2007 at the age of 34, after being poisoned (as attributed in the local newspapers). He was transported to Kenyatta National Hospital in Nairobi, where he died as he was being treated. He was survived by his widow, Jackline Ouma, and a child.
