= Shinyalu Constituency =

Electoral constituency of Kenya

Shinyalu Constituency is an electoral constituency in Kenya. It is one of twelve constituencies in Kakamega County. The constituency was established for the 1988 elections having been incepted from the larger Ikolomani constituency by then.

== Members of Parliament ==
Elections	MP	Party	Notes
1988	Japheth Livasia Lijoodi	KANU	One-party system.
1992	Japheth G. Shamalla	KANU	
1997	Daniel Lyula Khamasi	Ford-K	
2002	Daniel Lyula Khamasi	NARC	
2007	Charles Lugano	ODM	Lugano died in 2009.
2009	Justus Kizito	ODM	By-election.
2013	Silverse Anami Lisamula	ODM	General Elections
2017	Justus Kizito	ODM	General Election
2022	Fredrick Lusuli Ikana	ANC	General Election

== Wards ==
The constituency has six wards, all electing MCAs for the Kakamega County Assembly.

Wards
Ward	Registered Voters
Isukha West	10,181
Isukha East	9,724
Isukha North	21,965
Isukha South	16,003
Murhanda	12,994
Isukha Central	16,111
Total	76,978
*September 2022.
