= Bantu Mwaura =

- Died: 2009 (aged 39–40); Lang'ata, Nairobi
- Burial place: Lang'ata Cemetery, Nairobi
- Education: Kenyatta University- BA; University of Leeds- MA; Ohio State University- MA; New York University- PhD
- Occupations: Playwright; Poet; Lecturer; Thespian; Human rights activist
- Known for: Poetry
- Spouse: Susan Kagwiria Bantu
- Children: 2
- Website: jahazi.co.ke/about-jahazi/

Dr. Bantu Mwaura was a Kenyan performing artist, director, playwright, storyteller, poet and university lecturer. He was also a political and human rights activist and a cultural theorist who has worked mostly with civil society using theatre and performance in human rights and developmental work.

Bantu was also the founding editor and editor-in chief of Jahazi, a journal on the arts, culture and performance.

== Education ==
Bantu began his arts journey as a high school student at Aquinas High School in Nairobi, where he was the school Drama Club. He later on went to Egoji Teachers College and trained as a primary school teacher. His academic journey later on continued with a Bachelor's degree from Kenyatta University. Bantu also undertook his PhD in Performance Studies at the New York University and had a Master's degree in Theatre Studies from Leeds University (UK) and another Master's in African-American and African Studies from the Ohio State University (US).

His research was largely focused on examining how performance theory interfaces with theatre practice in Africa, how culture impacts and has been impacted upon by real politics, and on the politics of performance space.

== Work ==
=== Poetry ===
Bantu's poetry has been published in several journals and anthologies in English, Swahili and Gikuyu. He has been commissioned by organisations such as the World Council of Churches and the World Social Forum to write and perform poetry in international fora, performing poetry and spoken word in Europe, the United States and several countries in Africa. In Kenya, Bantu appeared in the monthly poetry slams organised by Kwani?, the leading East-African based literary magazine.

Bantu was part of the Poetry Africa programme at the World Social Forum in Nairobi in January 2007.

Bantu's poetry focused mainly on social and political issues, examining how society is ordered and how socio-economic and political issues impact on the advancement of society at large. In doing so his poetry was principally concerned with examining the African continent, its politics, its history and its place in the international arena. He has taught poetry, storytelling and playwriting in different universities in Kenya and the United States and his plays have been performed in Kenya, Zimbabwe, the US and the UK.

Some of his notable poems include The Politician and Cactus.

=== Activism ===
In the 90s Bantu Mwaura was an active member of the Release Political Prisoners (RPP) Group. Through this movement, they advocated against police brutality and for the release of people who were wrongly imprisoned, under the rule of the then president Daniel Toroitich Arap Moi. He worked alongside Njeri Kabeberi, among others.

=== Drama therapy ===
Bantu Mwaura was involved in the application of drama therapy in Kenya. In 2005, he directed a project at Lang’ata Women’s Prison through the Institute of Performing Artists Limited. The program engaged inmates nearing the end of their sentences, using performance-based methods intended to encourage reflection, reconciliation, and preparation for reintegration into society.

== Death ==
After being reported missing by his family, Bantu Mwaura's body was discovered days later, on April 27, 2009 outside the gate of his residence in Lang’ata, Nairobi. According to police reports, the body was found beside a bottle suspected to contain poison. Investigators also recovered a note from his house which, as described by those who read it, indicated in part that he "was gone forever."

As per the findings of a post-mortem examination, the cause of death for Bantu Mwaura was determined to be chemical poisoning.

Bantu Mwaura died one week after appearing on national television, where he discussed the rights of Mau Mau freedom fighters and expressed criticism of the post-colonial government’s treatment of its citizens.

Following his passing, many individuals shared moving tributes in his honor. Among those who paid tribute were:

- Shailja Patel
- Mbugua wa Mungai
- John Kamau

A four hour memorial performance honoring Bantu's life took place at the Kenya National Theatre on May 1, 2009. He was buried on Saturday May 2, 2009 at the Langata Cemetery in Nairobi.

Another memorial was held months later, on July 31, 2009 at Goethe Institut, Nairobi, in partnership with Twaweza Communications, the History Department University of Nairobi and the School of Journalism.

He and his wife Susan had two daughters, Mekatilili and Makeba.

== Select publications ==
- Mwaura, Bantu (2009-04-09), "Political Ridicule: Medialized Notions of 'Transparent Concealment'", Media and Identity in Africa, Edinburgh University Press, pp. 218–225.
- Mwaura, Bantu. "Kenyan Youth and the Entropic Destruction of a Hopeful Social Order." Cultural Production and Social Change in Kenya: Building Bridges, edited by Kimani Njogu and G. Oluoch-Olunya. Twaweza Communications, 2007, pp. 63–74.
- Mwaura, Bantu. "Song as Political Action in the Performance of the Mau Mau Songs." Songs and Politics in Eastern Africa (2007): 201.
- Mwaura, B. (2007). Orature of combat: Cultural aesthetics of song as political action in the performance of the mau mau songs. In K. Njogu and Hervé Maupeu (Eds.), Songs and Politics in Eastern Africa (pp. 201–224). Dar es Salaam, Tanzania: Mkuki Na Nyota Publishers
- Mwaura, Bantu. "Manufacturing Belief, Performing Life." Jahazi, vol. 1, 2006.
- Orature of combat: Cultural aesthetics of song as political action in the performance of the Mau Mau songs / Bantu Mwaura
- Bantu’s essay on the aid industry in Africa, Dancing to the Donor's Tune, in Missionaries, Mercenaries and Misfits (ed. Rasna Warah, 2008)
