= Gilbert Deya =

Kenyan evangelist (1952–2025)

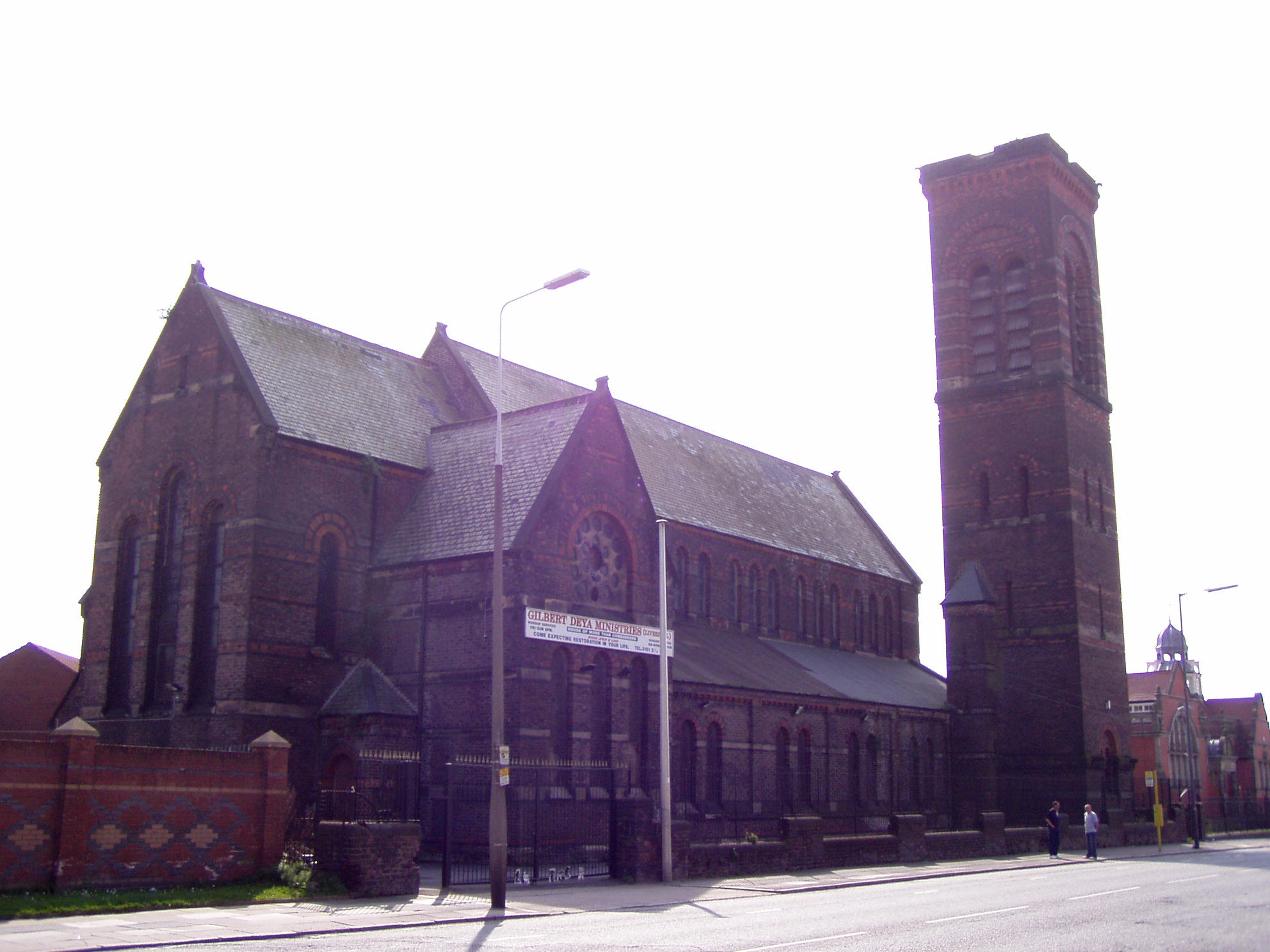
Church in Liverpool

Gilbert Juma Deya (/ˈdeɪə/) (2 February 1952 – 17 June 2025) was a Kenyan stonemason turned evangelist who lived in Britain from the mid-1990s until 2017, when he was extradited to Kenya to face charges of stealing five children between 1999 and 2004. He was acquitted of the charges in 2023.

His organization, Gilbert Deya Ministries, that Deya was able to help infertile women to conceive through the power of prayer.

== Background ==
Deya was born in the morning of 2 February 1952 in Juja, Kiambu County, outside of Nairobi, as the eleventh child in a family of 15 children. He belonged to Luo tribe, and his name "Juma" means Sunday, which was the day he was born. His father, Samuel Oyanda Deya was a sisal plantations worker from Bondo working in Juja. His parents were never meant to be a couple because his mother, Monica Nono Deya, declined the arranged marriage with his father.

He attended primary school but the school preacher dropped out because of bullying and poverty. He started preaching Jinja, Kampala, in Uganda, where he beat up a woman for hitting the children of his sister and worked there as a porter.

Deya married his 14-year-old wife, Mary Anyango, when he was 21. They gave birth to fifteen children in total. He started the "Salvation of Jesus Christ Church" in 1976.

He was ordained by the United Evangelical Church of Kenya and styled himself "Archbishop". He was an evangelist in Kenya in the late 1980s to early 1990s, but moved to the UK, establishing Gilbert Deya Ministries in 1997. The ministry at its peak activity had church services at rented and owned buildings in Liverpool, London, Birmingham, Nottingham, Luton, Reading, Manchester and Sheffield. In 2006 it acquired a building and planning permission in Leeds. The church claimed to be "the fastest growing Ministry in the UK and worldwide".

In 2013 Deya was arrested in the UK and charged with raping and attempting to rape a woman and sexually assaulting a teenage girl. He was found not guilty on all counts in 2014.

The church was placed under its formal investigations by the Charity Commission in 2004 and again in 2016, and the commission appointed Interim Managers in March 2021 to manage the affairs of the charity.

== 'Miracle Babies' and child trafficking ==
The Gilbert Deya Ministries claimed that Deya's powers allowed him to be able to cause infertile women to become pregnant. Deya claimed that "through the power of prayer and the Lord Jesus" he helped sterile women give birth. In the UK, one woman was claimed to have had three children in less than a year. The women travelled to Kenya in order to "give birth". On her return a suspicious GP alerted the local social services department, leading to court proceedings to protect the babies.

Deya's wife, Eddah (also known as Mary Deya), was arrested during November 2004 in Nairobi and charged with stealing children. Ten children, none of whom had any genetic connection to the Deya family, were found at Deya's House. Twenty babies were placed in foster care in Kenya after DNA tests showed they had no connection to their alleged mothers. Rose Atieno Kiserem, a former pastor with Deya's ministry was jailed along with Mrs. Deya. Upon her release from jail, Kiserem confessed that the 'miracle babies' were "a hoax created by the Deyas and their accomplices to deceive me and other God-fearing people."

Deya had a warrant out for his arrest in Kenya for the trafficking of babies out of the country. The Kenyan police alleged that the ministry was a baby-snatching ring, and they petitioned for his extradition from the UK. Deya sought political asylum from his base in Glasgow. He was arrested by police at Edinburgh Sheriff Court in 2006.

In November 2004 the High Court in the UK ruled that a 'miracle baby' in London was the victim of child trafficking, and that the supposed miracle displayed was a ruse in order to generate funds from a "deceived congregation". Justice Ryder ruled that in order to maintain the illusion of a genuine birth, the child's 'mother' was seriously assaulted "and a live child who had been born to another family was presented to her as her child." He also ruled that "[the baby's] birth as described was a falsehood not a miracle."

On 13 December 2006, Deya was arrested in London by the Metropolitan Police. A police spokesman said Gilbert Deya was detained under an arrest warrant issued by Kenyan authorities, who had charged him with child abduction and trafficking. He was ordered by a court on 8 November 2007, to be extradited from the UK to Kenya to face five counts of child stealing.

Deya appealed against extradition on the grounds that he might face torture in Kenya, but in late 2008 his case was rejected by the High Court and leave to appeal to the House of Lords was refused. It was reported in April 2010 that Deya was still in England and David Lammy, Deya's MP, enquired of the government why he had not yet been extradited. Lammy was concerned that justice was being denied to several of his constituents who were victims of the trafficked babies fraud. The Home Office responded that it was still considering representations from Deya's solicitors that sending him to Kenya would breach his human rights.

In January 2011, a court in Kenya convicted Mary Deya of stealing a baby from Kenyatta National Hospital in 2005 and making a false statement that she had given birth to the baby in question. She was later acquitted on separate charges of obtaining registration for five children irregularly.

In September 2011, news reports indicated that all avenues of appeal had been exhausted and Deya would soon be extradited to Kenya.

The London Evening Standard reported on 21 October 2016 that Deya had applied for a judicial review of the decision to extradite him.

On 12 July 2017, Premier Christian Media reported that the High Court had refused Deya's application for a judicial review and that he would be extradited.

On 3 August 2017, Deya was extradited from the UK to Kenya to face child trafficking charges. He was immediately arraigned in court for child trafficking offences. He subsequently divorced his wife, supposedly because her involvement in baby theft had tarnished his reputation.

In April 2020, Deya's hearing was delayed because of COVID-19. However, the case resumed in early 2021. Deya's legal team launched a bid to block prosecutors from calling several witnesses from abroad whose testimonies had been halted because of COVID-19. However, Chief Magistrate Francis Andayi denied the motion. In May 2023, Deya gave testimony in which he denied the charges against him.

Local press reported that judgment was passed by the court in Nairobi on 29 June 2023. Deya was acquitted on all charges based on a lack of evidence. Magistrate Robison Ondieki ruled that the prosecution had "failed to establish circumstantial evidence". Following the verdict, Deya suggested that he would seek to return to the UK.

== Death ==
Deya died on June 17, 2025, in a traffic collision after his vehicle collided with a university bus and another vehicle near the city of Kisumu in western Kenya. He was 72.
