= Kenya Communications (Amendment) Act, 2008 =

Kenyan Parliament
- Passed by: 10th Parliament of Kenya
- Passed: January 2, 2009
- Enacted: January 2, 2009
- Status: Current legislation

The Kenya Communications (Amendment) Act, 2008 is a Kenyan Act of Parliament that was passed by the 10th Parliament of Kenya and signed into law by President Mwai Kibaki on 2 January 2009. It is a controversial amendment of the Kenya Communications Act of 1998, which authorizes the state to raid media houses and control the distribution of content. It also gives the government the right to:

- penalise media infractions with heavy fines and prison terms
- sole discretion in granting broadcast licences
- control of programme content and broadcasts.

The bill was opposed by the ODM of Prime Minister Raila Odinga, and the Kenyan Union of Journalists.

Due to protests by Kenyan journalists, Kibaki ordered the attorney general and information minister to review the Act and suggest any possible amendments; possible amendments could address such contentious areas as Section 88 - 92.
