= Wazi campaign =

Public awareness campaign

The Wazi Campaign
- Founded: 2010
- Founder: Lara Mastropasqua
- Type: Public Awareness & Advocacy
- Purpose: National Cohesion, Corruption, Leadership, Peaceful Elections and Peaceful Voting, National Cohesion, Devolution
- Location: Nairobi, Kenya
- Region served: Kenya
- Key people: Lara Mastropasqua, Mugure Warobi
- Employees: 5
- Website: www.wazicampaign.org

The Wazi Campaign was a nationwide public awareness campaign that used 3-D animation to convey messages of peace and good governance in Kenya. This initiative was as a result of the bloody Post Elections Violence that rocked Kenya in 2007–08 Kenyan crisis.

The Wazi Campaign was officially launched in Nairobi on 6 December 2012 by the former Permanent Secretary for Information and Communications, Dr. Bitange Ndemo and the Wazi Campaign Founder and Director, Lara Mastropasqua and Kenya's satire cartoonist Godfrey Mwampembwa (popularly known as Gado) who is also the Executive Chairman of Buni Media.

== Babu ==
The main character in the Wazi Campaign Public Service Announcements was called Babu. He is an old man who is adorned in clothes that depict the Kenyan national flag colors. His voice in the PSAs is one that gives a fatherly and comforting advise to the young ones in the society.

== The Wazi Campaign Objective ==
The Wazi Campaign's objective was to inspire Kenyans to embrace peaceful elections in 2013 and to promote good governance principles.

== The Wazi Campaign Pillars ==
The Wazi Campaign was running a total of 6 PSAs (Public Service Announcements) covering the following topics:

1. National Cohesion (aired between August 2012 to 01 Dec 2012)
2. Corruption (airs between 01 Dec 2012 to 01 Feb 2013)
3. Leadership (airs between 01 Feb to 1 April 2013)
4. Peaceful Elections/peaceful voting (airs between 15 Feb and 14 March 2013)
5. National Cohesion (airs between 1 April to 1 June)
6. Devolution (airs between 1 June to 1 August 2013)

The Wazi Campaign Public Service Announcements were aired on Citizen TV, KBC, Kiss TV, NTV, QTV and KTN who all gave free airtime to the campaign. Fox Theaters were also showing it in their movie theatres after the national anthem.
