= Oscar Kamau Kingara =

Kenyan lawyer and activist (1971–2009)

The Oscar Foundation

Personal details
- Born: 14 June 1971 Kiambu, Kenya
- Died: Friday, March 5, 2009 (aged 38) State House Road, Nairobi
- Spouse: Nancy Wangeci Munene (m. 1997)
- Children: Natalie, Naima
- Occupation: Lawyer, politician, human rights activist
- Website: oscarfound.org

Oscar Kamau Kingara (July 14, 1971 - March 5, 2009) was a Kenyan lawyer and human rights activist. Kingara was the founder and director of the Oscar Foundation Free Legal Aid Clinic, a human rights organization based in Nairobi. His 2009 assassination is widely attributed to his work in documenting police killings.

== Early life ==
Kingara grew up in both Kiambu and Nairobi in modest circumstances. After graduating and acquiring a law degree, he opted to venture into the family business that involved manufacturing industries, meat and fish processing, real estate, import/export and dealership of building materials in Kenya.

== Human rights work ==
Kingara was director of Kenya's Oscar Legal Aid Foundation. He was credited with an important role in investigative work behind police killings in Kenya. In 2008, he released a report accusing Kenyan police of killing or torturing more than 8,000 people as part of a crackdown on the Mungiki criminal organization. Another report to which Kingara made major contributions, The Cry of Blood — Report on Extra-Judicial Killings and Disappearances, was widely publicised by WikiLeaks.

== Assassination ==
On March 5, 2009, Kingara and his assistant, John Paul Oulu, were ambushed and shot as they sat in rush hour traffic in a white Mercedes outside of the University of Nairobi dormitories. Kingara, who was 38 years old, was killed instantly while Oulu died soon after. The three gunmen, who were dressed in dark suits, escaped in two cars. Critics quickly pointed to elements within the Kenyan security forces and police as responsible for the assassinations. Following the assassination, WikiLeaks called for witness reports and described Kingara and Oulu as "Wikileaks-related senior human rights activists". Kenyan Prime Minister Raila Odinga condemned the killings, saying, "We are hurtling towards failure as a state."

The United Nations Special Rapporteur on extrajudicial killings, Professor Philip Alston, has urged the Kenyan government to establish independent investigations into the killing of the two activists. Alston said that the way the two men were killed was likely to cast suspicions on police.
