= G. G. Njuguna Ngengi =

Kenyan politician

G. G. Njūgūna Ngengi
- Born: Molo, Kenya
- Died: 2 January 2008; Kuresoi, Kenya
- Occupations: Politician, Former Army Captain
- Known for: Political activism, Councillor in Molo
- Criminal charge: Violent robbery (1993)
- Criminal penalty: Sentenced to prison (1995), released (1997)
- Relatives: Josephine Nyawira Ngengi (sister)

G. G. Njuguna Ngengi (died January 2, 2008) was a Kenyan politician native to Molo, Kenya.

He came into international attention in 1993 when he and an assistant, Mr. Koigi wa Wamwere, were charged with violent robbery after they allegedly stormed the Bahati Police Station. They were sentenced to prison following a controversial trial in 1995, a move that was condemned by the European Union and Amnesty International among others. Ngengi was released in 1997.

Ngengi was a councillor in Molo before his sentence. He is also a former army captain.

His sister Josephine Nyawira Ngengi was arrested and charged in 1994 for allegedly robbing a supermarket.

== Death ==
Ngengi was killed on January 2, 2008, in Kuresoi during a meeting he was addressing in a bid to broker peace between the warring local communities following the controversial 2007 Kenyan presidential election. Several armed youth came in and shot Ngengi with a bow before they hacked him to death. According to Litabalia Achesa security was increased in the area following his death.
