= Kenya National Commission on Human Rights =

The Kenya National Commission on Human Rights (KNCHR) is an autonomous national human rights institution, established by the Kenya National Commission on Human Rights Act, 2011. It is a successor to the body of the same name established by an earlier Act of Parliament in 2002. The original KNCHR became operational in July 2003, and following the promulgation of the Constitution of Kenya in August 2010, was legally reconstituted as the Kenya National Human Rights and Equality Commission (under Article 59 of the Constitution). The 2011 legislation restructured the body, assigning the equality function to a new National Gender and Equality Commission and reestablishing the name of the KNCHR.

The main mission of the KNCHR, in its successive legal embodiments, has been to investigate and provide redress for human rights violations in Kenya, to research and monitor the compliance of human rights norms and standards, human rights education and training and campaigns, advocate, and collaborate with other stakeholders in Kenya. The KNCHR has six programmes to implement its strategic goals.

The KNCHR is led by a Chairperson and four other Commissioners appointed by the President of Kenya after nomination by a selection panel consisting of governmental and non-governmental interests. The current Acting Chairperson is Dr Samuel Kipng'etich arap Tororei who took over from Florence Simbiri-Jaoko whose term of office expired on January 9, 2012. Under the earlier legislation the KNCHR had nine Commissioners, four of whom also left the Commission on January 9, 2012, at the expiry of their terms of office. A new substantive Chairperson is expected to be appointed in November 2012.

A Secretariat headed by the Commission Secretary runs the KNCHR's programmatic areas. The mandate of the KNCHR is to enhance the promotion and protection of human rights in Kenya. Although established by the Government, the KNCHR is independent.

The KNCHR is a watchdog body. It monitors Government institutions, carries out investigations on alleged human rights violations, and in appropriate cases provides redress to those whose rights have been violated. KNCHR is also an advisory body. The Commission gives advice to the Kenyan Government on how to enhance the promotion and protection of human rights. It also monitors the enactment of legislation in Kenya and recommends existing legislation for review to ensure they comply with human rights standards.

The KNCHR's main office is at CVS Plaza, Kasuku/Lenana Road in Nairobi with two regional offices, one in Wajir in the North Eastern province and another in Kitale in the Rift Valley Province launched in September 2007.

From 1999 to 2007, Alice Wairimu Nderitu headed the human rights education department (the Human Rights Education and Capacity-Building Programme) of the Commission.

== International status ==
The KNCHR aims to comply with the United Nations-approved Paris Principles on the establishment and functioning of independent national human rights institutions. The Commission has been accredited as an 'A status' institution by the International Co-ordinating Committee of National Human Rights Institutions (ICC), which is based in Geneva and is supported by the Office of the High Commissioner for Human Rights. This means that the Commission has been evaluated by its peers as generally in compliance with the Principles. The KNCHR is a member of the Network of African National Human Rights Institutions (NANHRI), the ICC's regional grouping for Africa.

== See also ==
- Human rights in Kenya
- The Truth, Justice and Reconciliation Commission of Kenya
