= Donald Odanga =

Kenyan basketball player

Donald Odanga (died 20 January 2008) was a Kenyan Basketball International.

Odanga played for the Kenya national basketball team, Kenya Railways and defunct Premiership side Post Bank. Odanga played for Railways from early 1980s before moving to defunct premier league side Post Bank in 1990. He was a member of the national team between 1989 and 1994.

== Death ==
Odanga was hit by a stray bullet while standing about 200m away from a scene where policemen were trying to disperse a rowdy mob in Mathare on 20 January 2008. "It is unfortunate that Odanga who was one of the best players of his generation had to die this way," Nairobi Province Basketball Association chairman Ronny Owino said in Nairobi on Thursday.
