= Johnson Gicheru =

12th Chief Justice of the Republic of Kenya (died 2020)

Johnson Evan Gicheru (died 25 December 2020) was a Kenyan lawyer and the Chief Justice of Kenya. He was appointed by President Mwai Kibaki upon his election in 2003. He was the 12th Chief Justice of the Republic of Kenya and served the longest term by any African Chief Justice in Kenya's history, from 2003 and finally retiring on 27 February 2011. He died on 25 December 2020.

== Early career ==
Early in his career, he worked as a Senior State Counsel in the Office of the Attorney General and as an administrative officer in the Office of the President. Justice Gicheru was appointed a Judge of the High Court in 1982 and on 8 June 1988, he was appointed to the Court of Appeal. During this time, he was appointed chairperson of a judicial inquiry into the death of Foreign Affairs Minister Robert Ouko. The commission was disbanded before publishing its findings. His tenure as Chief Justice began on February 21, 2003.

== Personal life ==
Mr. Justice Gicheru was married to Mrs. Margaret Gicheru and they had 7 children.

== See also ==
- Chief Justice of Kenya
- Court of Appeal of Kenya
- High Court of Kenya
