= Mungiki =

Banned ethnic organization in Kenya

- Mũngĩkĩ
- Founded: 1989
- Founders: Unknown (rumored Kikuyu youth militants)
- Legal status: Banned
- Headquarters: Nairobi, Kenya
- Region served: Kenya

Mungiki is a banned ethnic organisation in Kenya. The name (mũngĩkĩ, [mo.ᵑɡe.ke]) means "a united people" or "multitude" in the Kikuyu language. The organization, which apparently originated in the late 1980s, is secretive and bears some similarity to mystery religions. Specifics of their origin and doctrines are unclear. However, the supposed doctrine of Mungiki incorporates elements of traditional Kikuyu customs and values, promoting a return to African spirituality, communal living, and resistance against post-colonial influences.

They reject Westernisation and all things that they believe to be trappings of colonialism, including Christianity. The ideology of the group is characterised by revolutionary rhetoric, Kikuyu traditions, and a disdain for Kenyan modernisation, which is seen as moral corruption. They have been newsworthy for associations with ethnic violence and anti-government resistance.

== History ==
According to one of Mungiki's founders, the group began in the late 1980s as a local militia in the highlands to protect Kikuyu farmers in disputes over land with Maasai and with forces loyal to the government, which was dominated by the Kalenjin tribe at the time. Mungiki arguably has its roots in discontent arising from severe unemployment and landlessness arising from Kenya's rapid population growth, with many disaffected unemployed youth attracted to an organisation giving them a sense of purpose and cultural and political identity, as well as income.

The founders supposedly modelled Mungiki on the Mau Mau fighters who fought British colonial rule. During the 1990s, the group had migrated into Nairobi with the acceptance of the government under Daniel arap Moi and began to dominate the matatu (private minibus taxi) industry. With the move to Nairobi came the development of a cell structure within the group. Each cell contains 50 members and each cell is then divided into 5 platoons.

Using the matatus as a springboard, the group moved into other areas of commerce, such as rubbish collection, construction, and even protection racketeering. Inevitably, the group's actions led to involvement with politicians eager for more support. In 2002, Mungiki backed losing candidates in elections and felt the wrath of the government. The group's activities became less visible although it still received revenue from protection taxes, electricity taxes and water taxes. There have been unconfirmed allegations that Mungiki has links to both the old KANU government and some MPs in the current government. In fact, because of the organization's extreme secrecy, little is known about its membership or hierarchy.

Many members state that at the height of its influence, the group could claim as many as 500,000 members and received substantial sums of money. Many Kenyans debate whether the group's influence in Nairobi is waning or is on the rise.

On 12 July 2007 Kenyan authorities reported that Mungiki decapitated and mutilated the body of a two-year-old boy, possibly as part of a ritual.

It is alleged that Mungiki members participated in targeted violence against ethnic Luos around the time of the disputed December 2007 presidential elections.

== Police response ==
In November 2007, a human-rights group called the Oscar Foundation Free Legal Aid Clinic-Kenya reported that in the five years up to August 2007, Kenyan police had killed over 8,000 people in crackdowns against the Mungiki sect, with further 4,000 people still missing. These allegations were based on interviews, autopsies, and police reports, and were widely circulated both in Kenya and through an appeal to the International Criminal Court.

Meanwhile, the Kenya National Commission on Human Rights linked the police to the execution of 500 Mungiki over the previous five months. The police described these reports as fictitious. On 5 March 2009, Oscar Foundation Director Oscar Kamau Kingara and Programme Coordinator John Paul Oulo were shot and killed while en route to a meeting at the offices of the Kenya National Commission on Human Rights in Nairobi. Earlier that day, a government spokesman, Alfred Mutua, had publicly accused their organisation of being a fundraising front for Mungiki.

Mungiki chairman Maina Njenga was acquitted on October 27, 2009 as murder charges on him were withdrawn for lack of evidence. About a week later Mungiki spokesman David Gitau Njuguna was shot dead in Nairobi by unknown assailants.

== The Waki Report ==
A commission set up to investigate the 2008 post-election violence reported that Mungiki members were suspected of perpetrating the violence. The Waki Report states that a meeting was held in Statehouse to coordinate revenge on Luos and Kalenjins.

The report also recommends that people cited, including minister Uhuru Kenyatta, and Muthaura should face a local judiciary or the International Criminal Court(ICC).

== Exile ==
Many former Mungiki members are believed to have fled the country seeking asylum, as the sect does not allow defection; all initiates have to swear a standard oath ending with the words "May I die if I desert or reveal our secrets."

== See also ==
- Ethnic conflicts in Kenya
- Crime in Kenya
