= International Criminal Court investigations =

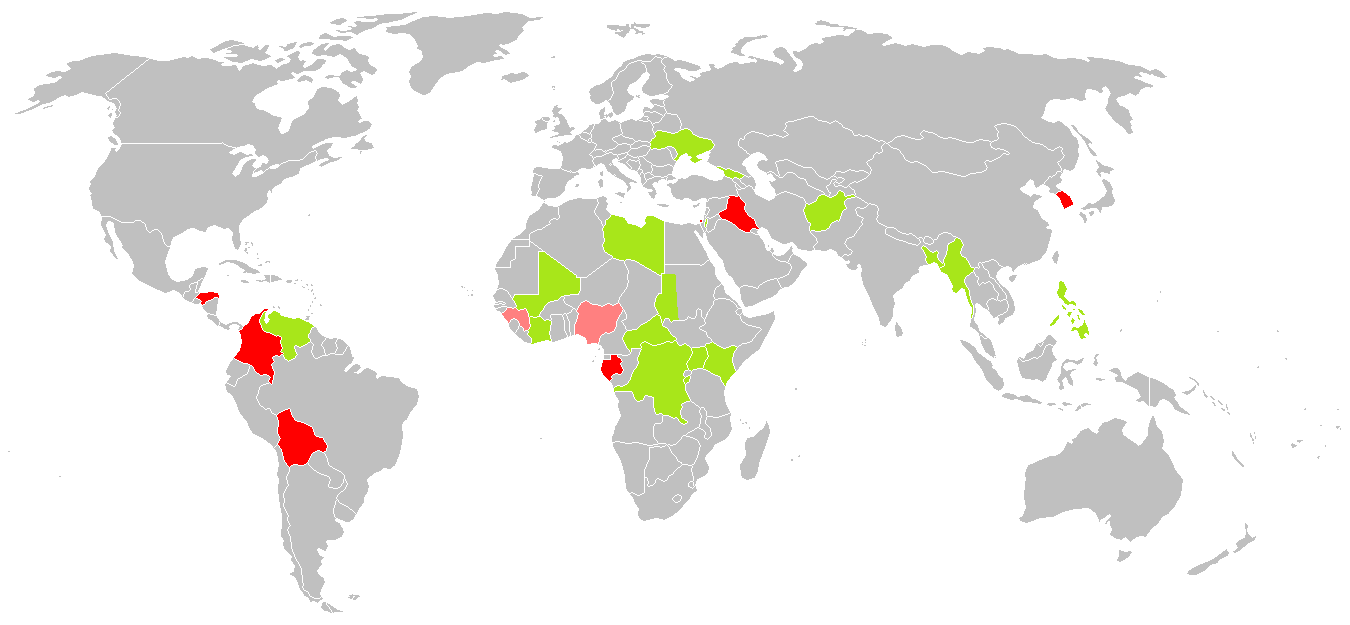
ICC investigations and examinations, as of March 2022 Green: Official investigations (Uganda, DR Congo, Central African Republic I + II, Darfur (Sudan), Kenya, Libya, Côte d'Ivoire, Mali, Georgia, Burundi, Afghanistan, Palestine, Venezuela I, Bangladesh/Myanmar, Philippines, Ukraine, Lithuania/Belarus) Light red: Ongoing preliminary examinations (Nigeria) Dark red: Closed preliminary examinations that have not resulted in an investigation (Colombia, Iraq, Honduras, South Korea, Comoros (registered vessels), Gabon, Bolivia, Guinea)

The International Criminal Court has opened investigations in Afghanistan, Bangladesh/Myanmar, Burundi, the Central African Republic (twice), Côte d'Ivoire, Darfur in Sudan, the Democratic Republic of the Congo, Georgia, Kenya, Libya, Lithuania/Belarus, Mali, Palestine, the Philippines, Uganda, Ukraine, and Venezuela I. The Office of the Prosecutor carried out and closed preliminary investigations in Bolivia; Colombia; Congo II; Gabon; Guinea; Honduras; Iraq/the United Kingdom; registered vessels of Comoros, Greece, and Cambodia; South Korea; and Venezuela II. An ongoing preliminary examination is being carried out in the situation in Nigeria.

The Court's Pre-Trial Chambers publicly indicted 76 people. Proceedings against 40 are ongoing: 34 are at large as fugitives, two cases are in the pre-trial stage, one person is on trial, and three cases are in the appeals stage. Proceedings against 36 have been completed: three are serving sentences, seven have finished sentences, four have been acquitted, eight have had the charges against them dismissed, five have had the charges against them withdrawn, and nine have died before the conclusion of the proceedings against them.

As of September 2010, the Office of the Prosecutor had received 8,874 communications about alleged crimes. After initial review, 4,002 of these communications were dismissed as "manifestly outside the jurisdiction of the Court".

== Overview ==
Detailed summary of investigations (Note: A situation is listed here if the Prosecutor of the Court has opened an investigation.) and prosecutions by the International Criminal Court
Situation	Individuals indicted (Note: Obviously, only persons who are publicly indicted are listed. The Court can issue an indictment under seal.)	Indicted (Note: If not otherwise noted, the indicted is wanted by warrant of arrest.)					Transfer to ICC; Initial appearance (Note: If there was a warrant of arrest, the dates of transfer to the International Criminal Court (in italics) and of the initial appearance are given. In case of a summons to appear, only the date of the initial appearance is given.)	Confirmation of charges hearing Result	Trial; Result	Appeal hearings Result	Current status	Ref.
Situation	Individuals indicted	Date	G	CAH	WC	OAJ	Transfer to ICC; Initial appearance	Confirmation of charges hearing Result	Trial; Result	Appeal hearings Result	Current status	Ref.
Democratic Republic of the Congo; Investigation article	Thomas Lubanga Dyilo	10 February 2006	—	—	3	—	17 March 2006; 20 March 2006	9-28 November 2006 confirmed 29 January 2007	26 January 2009 – 26 August 2011 convicted 14 March 2012 sentenced 10 July 2012	19–20 May 2014 verdict and sentence confirmed 1 December 2014	Convicted and sentenced to 14 years imprisonment; decision final; reparations regime established; ICC-related sentence served (after 14 years)	
Democratic Republic of the Congo; Investigation article	Bosco Ntaganda	22 August 2006; 13 July 2012	—	3	7	—	22 March 2013; 26 March 2013	10-14 February 2014 confirmed 9 June 2014	2 September 2015 - 30 August 2018 convicted 8 July 2019 sentenced 7 November 2019	12–14 October 2020; Verdict and sentence confirmed 30 March 2021	Convicted and sentenced to 30 years imprisonment; decision final; in custody of Belgian authorities; release between 2033 and 2043	(Note: Article 110 (3) of the Rome Statute of the International Court states that "[w]hen the person has served two thirds of the sentence, or 25 years in the case of life imprisonment, the Court shall review the sentence to determine whether it should be reduced. Such a review shall not be conducted before that time." Article 78 (3) of the Rome Statute specifies that "[i]n imposing a sentence of imprisonment, the Court shall deduct the time, if any, previously spent in detention in accordance with an order of the Court. The Court may deduct any time otherwise spent in detention in connection with conduct underlying the crime." The Court's Trial Chamber VI determined in its sentencing decision that the time since 22 March 2013 is to be deducted from the sentence. Thus, Bosco Ntaganda is to be released on or before 22 March 2043. Starting from 22 March 2013, two-thirds of thirty years (twenty years) will elapse on 22 March 2033.)
Democratic Republic of the Congo; Investigation article	Germain Katanga	2 July 2007	—	3	6	—	17 October 2007; 22 October 2007	27 June–18 July 2008 confirmed 26 September 2008	24 November 2009 – 23 May 2012 convicted 7 March 2014 sentenced 23 May 2014	Appeals by Prosecution and Defence discontinued	Convicted and sentenced to 12 years imprisonment; decision final; reparations regime established; ICC-related sentence served (after 8 years, 4 months); remained in custody of DRC authorities due to other charges	
Democratic Republic of the Congo; Investigation article	Mathieu Ngudjolo Chui	6 July 2007	—	3	6	—	6 February 2008; 11 February 2008	27 June–18 July 2008 confirmed 26 September 2008	24 November 2009 – 23 May 2012 acquitted 18 December 2012	21 October 2014 acquittal confirmed 27 February 2015	Acquitted; decision final	
Democratic Republic of the Congo; Investigation article	Callixte Mbarushimana	28 September 2010	—	5	6	—	25 January 2011; 28 January 2011	16-21 September 2011 dismissed 16 December 2011			Proceedings finished with charges dismissed, released (Note: According to Article 61 (8) of the Rome Statute, "where the Pre-Trial Chamber declines to confirm a charge, the Prosecutor shall not be precluded from subsequently requesting its confirmation if the request is supported by additional evidence.")	
Democratic Republic of the Congo; Investigation article	Sylvestre Mudacumura	13 July 2012	—	—	9	—					Not in ICC custody; reportedly died on 17/18 September 2019	
Uganda; Investigation article	Joseph Kony	8 July 2005	—	12	21	—					Not in ICC custody	
Uganda; Investigation article	Okot Odhiambo	8 July 2005	—	3	7	—					Proceedings finished due to death	
Uganda; Investigation article	Raska Lukwiya	8 July 2005	—	1	3	—					Proceedings finished due to death	
Uganda; Investigation article	Vincent Otti	8 July 2005	—	11	21	—					Proceedings finished due to death	
Uganda; Investigation article	Dominic Ongwen	8 July 2005	—	3	4	—	21 January 2015; 26 January 2015	21–27 January 2016 confirmed 23 March 2016	6 December 2016 – 12 March 2020 convicted 4 February 2021 sentenced 6 May 2021	14-18 February 2022 verdict and sentence confirmed 15 December 2022	Convicted and sentenced to 25 years of imprisonment; decision final; in custody of Norwegian authorities, release between 2031 and 2040	(Note: Article 110 (3) of the Rome Statute of the International Court states that "[w]hen the person has served two thirds of the sentence, or 25 years in the case of life imprisonment, the Court shall review the sentence to determine whether it should be reduced. Such a review shall not be conducted before that time." Article 78 (3) of the Rome Statute specifies that "[i]n imposing a sentence of imprisonment, the Court shall deduct the time, if any, previously spent in detention in accordance with an order of the Court. The Court may deduct any time otherwise spent in detention in connection with conduct underlying the crime." The Court's Trial Chamber IX determined in its sentencing decision that the time since 4 January 2015 is to be deducted from the sentence. Thus, Dominic Ongwen is to be released on or before 4 January 2040. Starting from 4 January 2015, two-thirds of twenty-five years (sixteen years, eight months) will elapse on 4 September 2031.)
Central African Republic	Jean-Pierre Bemba	23 May 2008; 10 June 2008	—	3	5	—	3 July 2008; 4 July 2008	12-15 January 2009 confirmed 15 June 2009	22 November 2010 – 13 November 2014 convicted 21 March 2016 sentenced 21 June 2016	9-16 January 2018 acquitted 8 June 2018	Acquitted; decision final	
Central African Republic	Jean-Pierre Bemba	20 November 2013	—	—	—	2	23 November 2013; 27 November 2013	in writing confirmed 11 November 2014	29 September 2015 – 2 June 2016 convicted 19 October 2016 sentenced 22 March 2017 partially re-sentenced upon appeal 17 September 2018	Verdicts modified and re-sentencing partially remanded to Trial Chamber; 8 March 2018 re-sentencing confirmed 27 November 2019	Convicted and sentenced to one year of imprisonment and a fine of 300,000 USD; decision final; sentence served	
Central African Republic	Aimé Kilolo Musamba	20 November 2013	—	—	—	2	25 November 2013; 27 November 2013	in writing confirmed 11 November 2014	29 September 2015 – 2 June 2016 convicted 19 October 2016 sentenced 22 March 2017 partially re-sentenced upon appeal 17 September 2018	Verdicts modified and re-sentencing partially remanded to Trial Chamber; 8 March 2018 re-sentencing confirmed 27 November 2019	Convicted and sentenced to a fine of 30,000 USD; decision final	
Central African Republic	Fidèle Babala Wandu	20 November 2013	—	—	—	2	25 November 2013; 27 November 2013	in writing confirmed 11 November 2014	29 September 2015 – 2 June 2016 convicted 19 October 2016 sentenced 22 March 2017 partially re-sentenced upon appeal 17 September 2018	Verdicts modified and re-sentencing partially remanded to Trial Chamber; 8 March 2018 re-sentencing confirmed 27 November 2019	Convicted and sentenced to six months of imprisonment; decision final; sentence served	
Central African Republic	Jean-Jacques Mangenda Kabongo	20 November 2013	—	—	—	2	4 December 2013; 5 December 2013	in writing confirmed 11 November 2014	29 September 2015 – 2 June 2016 convicted 19 October 2016 sentenced 22 March 2017 partially re-sentenced upon appeal 17 September 2018	Verdicts modified and re-sentencing partially remanded to Trial Chamber; 8 March 2018 re-sentencing confirmed 27 November 2019	Convicted and sentenced to eleven months of imprisonment; decision final; sentence served	
Central African Republic	Narcisse Arido	20 November 2013	—	—	—	2	18 March 2014; 20 March 2014	in writing confirmed 11 November 2014	29 September 2015 – 2 June 2016 convicted 19 October 2016 sentenced 22 March 2017 partially re-sentenced upon appeal 17 September 2018	Verdicts modified and re-sentencing partially remanded to Trial Chamber; 8 March 2018 re-sentencing confirmed 27 November 2019	Convicted and sentenced to eleven months of imprisonment; decision final; sentence served	
Darfur, Sudan; Investigation article	Ahmed Haroun	27 April 2007	—	20	22	—					Not in ICC custody	
Darfur, Sudan; Investigation article	Ali Muhammad Ali Abd-Al-Rahman	27 April 2007	—	22	28	—	9 June 2020; 15 June 2020	24-26 May 2021 confirmed 9 July 2021	5 April 2022 –13 December 2024 convicted 6 October 2025 sentenced 9 December 2025		In ICC custody, convicted and sentenced to 20 years imprisonment, appeals possible; if conviction and sentence stand, to be released between 2033 and 2040	(Note: Article 110 (3) of the Rome Statute of the International Court states that "[w]hen the person has served two thirds of the sentence, or 25 years in the case of life imprisonment, the Court shall review the sentence to determine whether it should be reduced. Such a review shall not be conducted before that time." Article 78 (3) of the Rome Statute specifies that "[i]n imposing a sentence of imprisonment, the Court shall deduct the time, if any, previously spent in detention in accordance with an order of the Court. The Court may deduct any time otherwise spent in detention in connection with conduct underlying the crime." The Court's Trial Chamber I determined in its sentencing decision that the time since 9 June 2020 is to be deducted from the sentence. Thus, if conviction and sentence stand, Ali Muhammad Ali Abd-Al-Rahman is to be released on or before 9 June 2040. Starting from 9 June 2020, two-thirds of twenty years (13 years and four months) will elapse on 9 October 2033.)
Darfur, Sudan; Investigation article	Omar al-Bashir	4 March 2009; 12 July 2010	3	5	2	—					Not in ICC custody	
Darfur, Sudan; Investigation article	Bahr Idriss Abu Garda	7 May 2009 (summons)	—	—	3	—	18 May 2009	19-29 October 2009 dismissed 8 February 2010			Proceedings finished with charges dismissed	
Darfur, Sudan; Investigation article	Abdallah Banda	27 August 2009 (summons); 11 September 2014 (warrant of arrest)	—	—	3	—	17 June 2010	8 December 2010 confirmed 7 March 2011			Proceedings finished with confirmed charges withdrawn before trial	
Darfur, Sudan; Investigation article	Saleh Jerbo	27 August 2009 (summons)	—	—	3	—	17 June 2010	8 December 2010 confirmed 7 March 2011			Proceedings finished due to death	
Darfur, Sudan; Investigation article	Abdel Raheem Muhammad Hussein	1 March 2012	—	7	6	—					Not in ICC custody	
Kenya; Investigation article	William Ruto	8 March 2011 (summons)	—	4	—	—	7 April 2011	1-8 September 2011 confirmed 23 January 2012	10 September 2013 – 5 April 2016 (terminated)		Proceedings terminated without prejudice to re-prosecution	
Kenya; Investigation article	Joshua Sang	8 March 2011 (summons)	—	4	—	—	7 April 2011	1-8 September 2011 confirmed 23 January 2012	10 September 2013 – 5 April 2016 (terminated)		Proceedings terminated without prejudice to re-prosecution	
Kenya; Investigation article	Henry Kosgey	8 March 2011 (summons)	—	4	—	—	7 April 2011	1-8 September 2011 dismissed 23 January 2012			Proceedings finished with charges dismissed	
Kenya; Investigation article	Francis Muthaura	8 March 2011 (summons)	—	5	—	—	8 April 2011	21 September – 5 October 2011 confirmed 23 January 2012			Proceedings finished with confirmed charges withdrawn before trial	
Kenya; Investigation article	Uhuru Kenyatta	8 March 2011 (summons)	—	5	—	—	8 April 2011	21 September – 5 October 2011 confirmed 23 January 2012			Proceedings finished with confirmed charges withdrawn before trial	
Kenya; Investigation article	Mohammed Hussein Ali	8 March 2011 (summons)	—	5	—	—	8 April 2011	21 September – 5 October 2011 dismissed 23 January 2012			Proceedings finished with charges dismissed	
Kenya; Investigation article	Walter Barasa	2 August 2013	—	—	—	3					Not in ICC custody	
Kenya; Investigation article	Paul Gicheru	10 March 2015	—	—	—	6	3 November 2020; 6 November 2020	confirmed 15 July 2021	15 February 2022 – 27 June 2022		Proceedings finished due to death	
Kenya; Investigation article	Philip Kipkoech Bett	10 March 2015	—	—	—	4					Not in ICC custody	
Libya; Investigation article	Muammar Gaddafi	27 June 2011	—	2	—	—					Proceedings finished due to death	
Libya; Investigation article	Saif al-Islam Gaddafi	27 June 2011	—	2	—	—					Not in ICC custody	
Libya; Investigation article	Abdullah Senussi	27 June 2011	—	2	—	—					Proceedings finished with case held inadmissible	
Libya; Investigation article	Al-Tuhamy Mohamed Khaled	18 April 2013	—	4	3	—					Proceedings finished due to death	
Libya; Investigation article	Mahmoud al-Werfalli	15 August 2017; 4 July 2018	—	—	7	—					Proceedings finished due to death	
Libya; Investigation article	Saif Suleiman Sneidel	10 November 2020	—	—	3	—					Not in ICC custody	
Libya; Investigation article	Abdulrahem Al Kani	6 April 2023	—	—	4	—					Not in ICC custody	
Libya; Investigation article	Makhlouf Douma	6 April 2023	—	—	4	—					Not in ICC custody	
Libya; Investigation article	Nasser Al Lahsa	6 April 2023	—	—	4	—					Not in ICC custody	
Libya; Investigation article	Mohamed Salheen	6 April 2023	—	—	6	—					Not in ICC custody	
Libya; Investigation article	Abdelbari Al Shaqaqi	18 July 2023	—	—	4	—					Not in ICC custody	
Libya; Investigation article	Fathi Al Zinkal	18 July 2023	—	—	6	—					Not in ICC custody	
Libya; Investigation article	Osama Elmasry Njeem	18 January 2025	—	6	6	—					Not in ICC custody	
Libya; Investigation article	Khaled Mohamed Ali El Hishri	10 July 2025	—	11	6	—	1 December 2025; 3 December 2025	19–21 May 2026 confirmed 16 July 2026	scheduled to begin 4 May 2027		In ICC custody, charges confirmed	
Ivory Coast	Laurent Gbagbo	23 November 2011	—	4	—	—	30 November 2011; 5 December 2011	19–28 February 2013 confirmed 12 June 2014	28 January 2016 – 15 January 2019 acquitted 15 January 2019	22–24 June 2020; Acquittal confirmed 31 March 2021	Acquitted; decision final	
Ivory Coast	Charles Blé Goudé	21 December 2011	—	4	—	—	22–23 March 2014; 27 March 2014	29 September – 2 October 2014 confirmed 11 December 2014	28 January 2016 – 15 January 2019 acquitted 15 January 2019	22–24 June 2020; Acquittal confirmed 31 March 2021	Acquitted; decision final	
Ivory Coast	Simone Gbagbo	29 February 2012	—	4	—	—					Proceedings finished with charges withdrawn	
Mali; Investigation article	Ahmad al-Faqi al-Mahdi	18 September 2015	—	—	1	—	26 September 2015; 30 September 2015	1 March 2016 confirmed 24 March 2016	22–24 August 2016 convicted and sentenced 27 September 2016		Convicted and sentenced to nine years imprisonment; decision final; reparations regime established; ICC-related sentence served (after seven years)	
Mali; Investigation article	Iyad Ag Ghaly	18 July 2017	—	6	4	—					Not in ICC custody	
Mali; Investigation article	Al Hassan Ag Abdoul Aziz	27 March 2018	—	4	4	—	31 March 2018; 4 April 2018	8–17 July 2019 confirmed 30 September 2019	14 July 2020 – 25 May 2023 convicted 26 June 2024 sentenced 20 November 2024	Appeals by Prosecution and Defence discontinued	Convicted and sentenced to 10 years of imprisonment; decision final; set to be released in 2027	(Note: Article 110 (3) of the Rome Statute of the International Court states that "[w]hen the person has served two thirds of the sentence, or 25 years in the case of life imprisonment, the Court shall review the sentence to determine whether it should be reduced. Such a review shall not be conducted before that time." Article 78 (3) of the Rome Statute specifies that "[i]n imposing a sentence of imprisonment, the Court shall deduct the time, if any, previously spent in detention in accordance with an order of the Court. The Court may deduct any time otherwise spent in detention in connection with conduct underlying the crime." The Court's Trial Chamber X determined in its sentencing decision that the time since 28 March 2018 is to be deducted from the sentence. Thus, Al Hassan Ag Abdoul Aziz is to be released on or before 28 March 2028. Starting from 28 March 2018, two-thirds of ten years (six years, eight months) elapsed on 28 November 2024. On 23 July 2025, a panel of the Appeals Chamber decided that the sentence is set to be completed on 28 March 2027.)
Central African Republic II	Alfred Yekatom	11 November 2018	—	6	7	—	17 November 2018; 23 November 2018	19 September 2019 – 11 October 2019 confirmed 11 December 2019	16 February 2021 – 12 December 2024 convicted and sentenced 24 July 2025		In ICC custody, convicted and sentenced to 15 years imprisonment, appeals possible; if conviction and sentence stand, to be released between 2028 and 2033	(Note: Article 110 (3) of the Rome Statute of the International Court states that "[w]hen the person has served two thirds of the sentence, or 25 years in the case of life imprisonment, the Court shall review the sentence to determine whether it should be reduced. Such a review shall not be conducted before that time." Article 78 (3) of the Rome Statute specifies that "[i]n imposing a sentence of imprisonment, the Court shall deduct the time, if any, previously spent in detention in accordance with an order of the Court. The Court may deduct any time otherwise spent in detention in connection with conduct underlying the crime." The Court's Trial Chamber V determined in its sentencing decision that the time since 17 November 2018 is to be deducted from the sentence. Thus, if conviction and sentence stand, Alfred Yekatom is to be released on or before 17 November 2033. Starting from 17 November 2018, two-thirds of fifteen years (ten years) will elapse on 17 November 2028.) (Note: Article 110 (3) of the Rome Statute of the International Court states that "[w]hen the person has served two thirds of the sentence, or 25 years in the case of life imprisonment, the Court shall review the sentence to determine whether it should be reduced. Such a review shall not be conducted before that time." Article 78 (3) of the Rome Statute specifies that "[i]n imposing a sentence of imprisonment, the Court shall deduct the time, if any, previously spent in detention in accordance with an order of the Court. The Court may deduct any time otherwise spent in detention in connection with conduct underlying the crime." The Court's Trial Chamber V determined in its sentencing decision that the time since 12 December 2018 is to be deducted from the sentence. Thus, if conviction and sentence stand, Patrice-Edouard Ngaïssona is to be released on or before 12 December 2030. Starting from 12 December 2018, two-thirds of twelve years (eight years) will elapse on 12 December 2026.)
Central African Republic II	Patrice-Edouard Ngaïssona	7 December 2018	—	7	9	—	23 January 2019; 25 January 2019	19 September 2019 – 11 October 2019 confirmed 11 December 2019	16 February 2021 – 12 December 2024 convicted and sentenced 24 July 2025		In ICC custody, convicted and sentenced to 12 years imprisonment, appeals possible; if conviction and sentence stand, to be released between 2026 and 2030	
Central African Republic II	Edmond Beina	7 December 2018	—	4	6	—					Proceedings finished with case held inadmissible, appeal possible	
Central African Republic II	Maxime Mokom	10 December 2018	—	9	13	—	14 March 2022; 22 March 2022	22–24 August 2023			Proceedings finished with charges withdrawn	
Central African Republic II	Mahamat Said Abdel Kani	7 January 2019	—	8	6	—	24 January 2021; 28–29 January 2021	12–14 October 2021 confirmed 9 December 2021	26 September 2022 – 26 November 2025 convicted 23 September 2026		In ICC custody, convicted, sentencing pending	
Central African Republic II	Noureddine Adam	7 January 2019	—	5	1	—					Not in ICC custody	
Georgia; Investigation article	Mikhail Mindzaev	24 June 2022	—	—	5	—					Not in ICC custody	
Georgia; Investigation article	Gamlet Guchmazov	24 June 2022	—	—	5	—					Not in ICC custody	
Georgia; Investigation article	David Sanakoev	24 June 2022	—	—	2	—					Not in ICC custody	
Burundi											Investigation initiated	
Bangladesh/Myanmar; Investigation article											Investigation initiated	
Afghanistan; Investigation article	Haibatullah Akhundzada	8 July 2025	—	1	—	—					Not in ICC custody	
Afghanistan; Investigation article	Abdul Hakim Haqqani	8 July 2025	—	1	—	—					Not in ICC custody	
Afghanistan; Investigation article	Habibullah Agha	9 September 2025	—	1	—	—					Not in ICC custody	
Afghanistan; Investigation article	Neda Mohammad Nadeem	9 September 2025	—	1	—	—					Not in ICC custody	
Palestine; Investigation article Arrest warrants article	Mohammed Deif	21 November 2024	—	5	3	—					Proceedings finished due to death	
Palestine; Investigation article Arrest warrants article	Yoav Gallant	21 November 2024	—	3	4	—					Not in ICC custody	
Palestine; Investigation article Arrest warrants article	Benjamin Netanyahu	21 November 2024	—	3	4	—					Not in ICC custody	
Philippines; Investigation article	Rodrigo Duterte	7 March 2025	—	3	—	—	12 March 2025; 14 March 2025	23–27 February 2026 confirmed 23 April 2026	scheduled to begin 30 November 2026		In ICC custody, charges confirmed	
Philippines; Investigation article	Ronald dela Rosa	6 November 2025	—	1	—	—					Not in ICC custody	
Venezuela I Investigation article											Investigation initiated	
Ukraine; Investigation article Arrest warrants article	Vladimir Putin	17 March 2023	—	—	2	—					Not in ICC custody	
Ukraine; Investigation article Arrest warrants article	Maria Lvova-Belova	17 March 2023	—	—	2	—					Not in ICC custody	
Ukraine; Investigation article Arrest warrants article	Viktor Sokolov	5 March 2024	—	1	2	—					Not in ICC custody	
Ukraine; Investigation article Arrest warrants article	Sergey Kobylash	5 March 2024	—	1	2	—					Not in ICC custody	
Ukraine; Investigation article Arrest warrants article	Sergei Shoigu	24 June 2024	—	1	2	—					Not in ICC custody	
Ukraine; Investigation article Arrest warrants article	Valery Gerasimov	24 June 2024	—	1	2	—					Not in ICC custody	
Lithuania/Belarus											Investigation initiated	

== Opening investigation ==
The Prosecutor may open an investigation under three circumstances:

- when a situation is referred to by a state party;
- when a situation is referred by the United Nations Security Council, acting to address a threat to international peace and security; or
- when authorised by the Pre-Trial Chamber to open an investigation on the basis of information received from other sources, such as individuals or non-governmental organisations.

Of the nine cases that the Prosecutor had started investigating, five had been referred by states parties, two had been referred by the Security Council, and two had been authorised by the Pre-Trial Chamber to open an investigation, based on information received from other sources.

Summary of referrals of situation by the United Nations Security Council
Situation	Date of referral	UNSC Res.	Votes	For	Against	Abstained
Darfur, Sudan	31 March 2005	1593	11-0-4	(Argentina) (Benin) (Denmark) (France) (Greece) (Japan) (Philippines) (Romania) (Russia) (Tanzania) (United Kingdom)		(Algeria) (Brazil) (China) (United States)
Libya	26 February 2011	1970	15-0-0	(Bosnia and Herzegovina) (Brazil) (China) (Colombia) (France) (Gabon) (Germany) (India) (Lebanon) (Nigeria) (Portugal) (Russia) (South Africa) (United Kingdom) (United States)		

== Active investigations ==
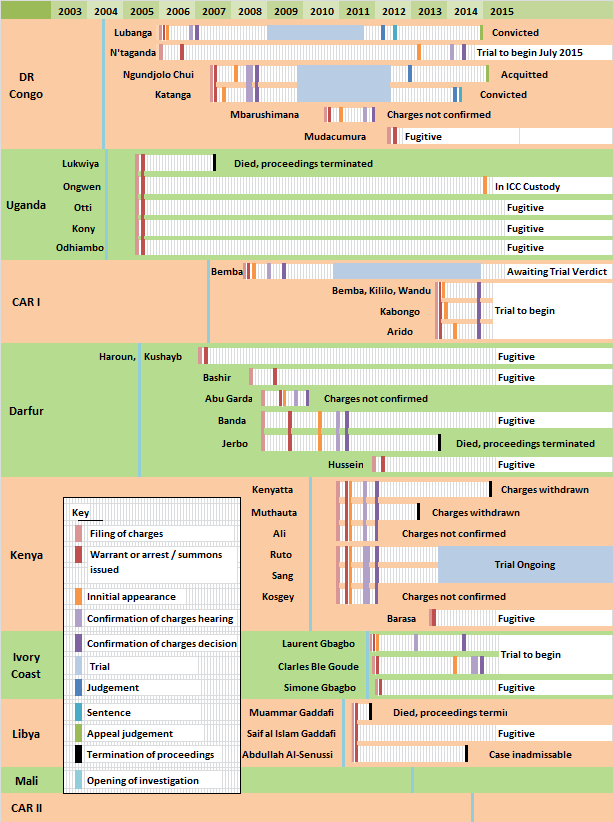
Timeline of ICC situations and cases

=== Uganda ===
In December 2003, the government of Uganda, a state party, referred to the Prosecutor the situation concerning the Lord's Resistance Army in Northern Uganda. The Prosecutor decided to open an investigation into the matter on 29 July 2004, and on 5 July, it was assigned to Pre-Trial Chamber II.

On 8 July 2005, the Court issued its first public arrest warrants for five senior leaders of the LRA alleging:

- Leader Joseph Kony committed the crimes against humanity of murder, enslavement, sexual enslavement, rape and serious bodily injury and the war crimes of murder, cruel treatment of civilians, attacking civilians, pillage, inducing rape and enlisting child soldiers
- Kony's deputy, Vincent Otti, committed the crimes against humanity of murder, sexual enslavement and serious bodily injury and the war crimes of inducing rape, attacking civilians, enlisting child soldiers, cruel treatment of civilians, pillage and murder
- Army Commander of the LRA Okot Odiambo committed the crime against humanity of enslavement and war crimes of attacking civilians, pillage and enlisting child soldiers; he reportedly led an attack on Barlonyo refugee camp (Aromo sub-county, Erute north constituency, Lira District) in February 2004 in which more than 300 people were massacred.
- LRA commander Raska Lukwiya committed the crime against humanity of enslavement and the war crimes of cruel treatment of civilians, attacking civilians and pillage
- LRA commander Dominic Ongwen committed the crimes against humanity of murder, enslavement and serious bodily injury and the war crimes of murder, cruel treatment of civilians, attacking civilians and pillage

Initially, none of the indictees was arrested, but Lukwiya was killed in fighting on 12 August 2006, Otti is said to have been killed in 2007, apparently by Kony. The three other suspects are believed to be either in Southern Sudan or the northwestern Ituri Province of the Democratic Republic of the Congo.

The government of Uganda is currently in peace talks with the LRA. The LRA's leaders have repeatedly demanded immunity from ICC prosecution in return for an end to the insurgency. The government says it is considering establishing a national tribunal that meets international standards, thereby allowing the ICC warrants to be set aside.

On 4 February 2021, Dominic Ongwen was found guilty of 61 crimes by Trial Chamber IX of ICC, comprising crimes against humanity and war crimes, committed in Northern Uganda between 1 July 2002 and 31 December 2005. He was sentenced to 25 years of imprisonment. He has appealed against both conviction and sentence, and that appeal is currently being decided.

=== Democratic Republic of the Congo ===
In March 2004, the government of the Democratic Republic of the Congo, referred to the Prosecutor "the situation of crimes within the jurisdiction of the Court allegedly committed anywhere in the territory of the DRC since the entry into force of the Rome Statute, on 1 July 2002." On 23 June, the Prosecutor decided to open an investigation into the matter, and on 4 July, the case was allocated to Pre-Trial Chamber I. In February 2008, at the time of the arrest of the third suspect, the Prosecutor announced that the arrest had closed the ICC investigations in Ituri.

==== Thomas Lubanga ====
On 17 March 2006, Thomas Lubanga, former leader of the Union of Congolese Patriots militia in Ituri, became the first person to be arrested under a warrant issued by the court and the first suspect to face trial at the ICC. A sealed (secret) warrant had been issued for his arrest on 10 February 2006 for the war crimes of using child soldiers. He was flown to the court the same day in a French military aircraft. The prosecutor has stated that his trial will be only on the allegation of using child soldiers, and other allegations will be followed up in a subsequent prosecution.

Originally, Lubanga's trial was to begin on 23 June 2008, but it was halted on 13 June when the Court ruled that the Prosecutor's refusal to disclose potentially exculpatory material had breached Lubanga's right to a fair trial. The Prosecutor had obtained the evidence from the United Nations and other sources on condition of confidentiality, but judges ruled that the Prosecutor had incorrectly applied the relevant provision of the Rome Statute and so "the trial process has been ruptured to such a degree that it is now impossible to piece together the constituent elements of a fair trial". The Court lifted the suspension on 18 November 2008; Lubanga's trial began on 26 January 2009.

On 14 March 2012, the Court, by unanimous verdict of the Trial Chamber, found Lubanga guilty as a co-perpetrator in the use of child soldiers. Lubanga was sentenced to 14 years of imprisonment and was released on 15 March 2020.

==== Germain Katanga and Mathieu Ngudjolo Chui ====
Two more participants in the Ituri conflict, Germain Katanga and Mathieu Ngudjolo Chui, were also surrendered to the Court by the Congolese authorities. Both men are charged with six counts of war crimes and three counts of crimes against humanity, relating to an attack on the village of Bogoro on 24 February 2003 in which at least 200 civilians were killed, survivors were imprisoned in a room filled with corpses, and women and girls were sexually enslaved. The charges against both men include murder, sexual slavery and using children under 15 years to participate actively in hostilities.

Katanga, the former leader of the Ngiti-majority Front for Patriotic Resistance of Ituri militia, was transferred to the Court on 17 October 2007; Ngudjolo, former leader of the National Integrationist Front, was transferred to the Court on 6 February 2008. The hearing to confirm the charges against them began on 27 June 2008. The trial against the two men started on 24 November 2009.

On 7 March 2014, Katanga was found guilty as an accessory of one count of crime against humanity and four counts of war crimes, committed on 24 February 2003, during an attack on the village of Bogoro, in Congo. He was sentenced to 12 years' imprisonment on 23 May 2014.

Mathieu Ngudjolo Chui was acquitted, on 18 December 2012, of the charges of crimes against humanity and war crimes, and was ordered for immediate release. This verdict was upheld by the Appeals Chamber on 27 February 2015.

==== Callixte Mbarushimana ====
On 20 August 2010, the Prosecutor requested Pre-Trial Chamber I to issue a warrant of arrest against Callixte Mbarushimana. He is alleged to have been the Executive Secretary of the Forces démocratiques de libération du Rwanda – Forces Combattantes Abacunguzi (FDLR-FCA, FDLR). On 28 September 2010, the Pre-Trial Chamber complied with the request and issued a sealed warrant of arrest which was unsealed on 11 October 2010, the day that French authorities arrested Mbarushimana. The suspect was transferred to the ICC on 25 January 2011. His confirmation of charges hearing was held from 16 to 21 September 2011. By a 2–1 majority, Pre-Trial Chamber I ruled on 16 December 2011 that the confirmation was declined. After the Prosecutor's appeal against the decision was rejected, Mbarushimana was released on 23 December 2011.

=== Central African Republic ===
In December 2004, the government of the Central African Republic, a state party, referred to the Prosecutor "the situation of crimes within the jurisdiction of the Court committed anywhere on the territory of the Central African Republic since 1 July 2002, the date of entry into force of the Rome Statute".

On 13 April 2006, the Court of Cassation of the Central African Republic investigating charges or murder and rape committed by former President Ange-Felix Patasse and Congolese Vice-President Jean-Pierre Bemba said that they could not secure the arrest of the suspects despite international arrest warrants, and they requested the ICC to take responsibility. The allegations against Bemba date to when his Movement for the Liberation of Congo rebel army was invited by Patasse into the capital, Bangui, to fight rebels who were fighting against Patasse. Also referred to the court were the cases of a French policeman and two aides of Patasse who were all involved in the alleged crimes, which human rights groups allege had about 400 victims.

Local activists from the Union of Central African Journalists (UJCA) have also accused the President, François Bozizé, of committing genocide against the inhabitants of the north Central African Republic, who supported the former regime, after seizing power in 2003, and he asked the court to prosecute Bozizé.

In November 2005, the Office of the Prosecutor held meetings with the government, judiciary authorities, civil society and international community representatives in CAR to gather additional information for the preliminary analysis.

In September 2006, the government filed a complaint with the court that claimed the Prosecutor had failed to decide within a reasonable time whether or not to investigate. In response the pre-trial chamber ordered the prosecutor to submit a report by 15 December 2006 as to the current status of the investigation and an estimate of when a decision on whether to investigate will be made.

On 22 May 2007, the Prosecutor announced his decision to open an investigation, focusing on allegations of killing and rape in 2002 and 2003, a period of intense fighting between government and rebel forces. The case has been allocated to Pre-Trial Chamber III.

On 24 May 2008, former Vice-President Jean-Pierre Bemba was arrested during a visit to Belgium under a sealed warrant under accusations of war crimes and crimes against humanity committed in CAR He was transferred to the ICC on 3 July 2008. His confirmation of charges hearing, taking place from 12 to 15 January 2009, resulted in the charges being confirmed on 15 June 2009. His trial began on 22 November 2010. He was acquitted from the charges of war crimes and crimes against humanity by the Appeals Chamber on 8 June 2018.

On 16 December 2022, the Prosecutor announced the conclusion of investigations in the situation of Central African Republic.

=== Darfur, Sudan ===
On 31 March 2005, the United Nations Security Council passed Resolution 1593, referring "the situation prevailing in Darfur since 1 July 2002" to the Prosecutor. The Prosecutor opened an investigation into the situation on 6 June, and the case was allocated to Pre-Trial Chamber I.

==== Ahmed Haroun and Ali Muhammad Ali Abd-Al-Rahman ====
In February 2007 the Prosecutor announced that two men (Sudanese humanitarian affairs minister Ahmad Muhammad Harun and Janjaweed militia leader Abd-Al-Rahman) had been identified as key suspects, accused of war crimes and crimes against humanity. On 2 May 2007, the Court issued arrest warrants for the two men. However, Sudan claims the Court has no jurisdiction over this matter and refuses to hand over the suspects. Mr Abd-Al-Rahman was transferred to the ICC's custody on 9 June 2020, after surrendering himself voluntarily in the Central African Republic. His initial appearance before the ICC took place on 15 June 2020. He is charged with 31 counts of war crimes and crimes against humanity allegedly committed in Darfur, Sudan, between August 2003 and at least April 2004. The trial for these charges began on 5 April 2022.

==== Omar al-Bashir ====
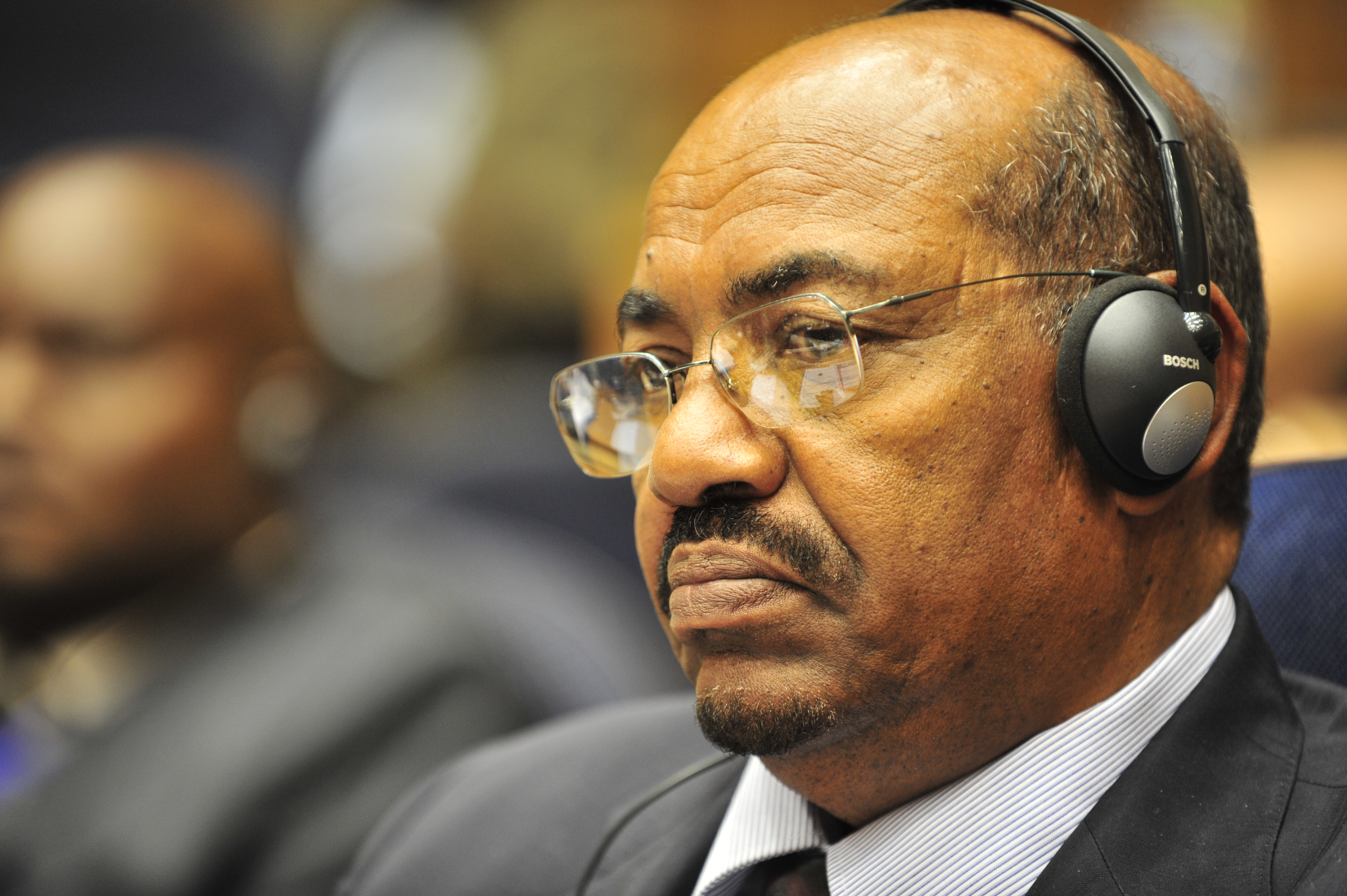
Sudanese President Omar al-Bashir, wanted by the ICC for war crimes and crimes against humanity

On 14 July 2008, the Prosecutor accused Sudanese President Omar al-Bashir of genocide, crimes against humanity and war crimes. In July 2008, the Chief Prosecutor applied to the Court for an arrest warrant for President of Sudan Omar al-Bashir on ten counts of genocide, crimes against humanity and war crimes. In October, the Court asked the Prosecutor for more information to support the charges.

The court issued an arrest warrant for al-Bashir on 4 March 2009 for war crimes and crimes against humanity but ruled that there was insufficient evidence to prosecute him for genocide. Al-Bashir was the first sitting head of state indicted by the ICC. Al-Bashir denies all the charges by describing them as "not worth the ink they are written in". In July 2009, the member states of the African Union agreed not to co-operate in his arrest. Nevertheless, several African Union members who are also parties of the ICC, including South Africa and Uganda, let it be known that al-Bashir might be arrested if he entered their territory. However, in July and August 2010 al-Bashir traveled to Chad and Kenya, neither of which turned him over to the ICC despite being parties; the ICC has reported both member states to the UN Security Council and the ICC Assembly of States Parties.

On 3 February 2010, the Appeals Chamber of the ICC reversed the Pre-Trial Chamber's rejection of the genocide charge by ruling that the PTC had applied a too stringent standard of proof. Subsequently, the First Pre-Trial Chamber issued a second warrant of arrest against al-Bashir on 12 July 2010 in which he was charged with genocide against three ethnic groups in Darfur.

Omar Al Bashir is still at large, and is not within ICC custody.

==== Bahr Idriss Abu Garda ====
On 17 May 2009, it was the first time that a suspect appeared voluntarily before the Court. Bahr Idriss Abu Garda, commander of the United Resistance Front, a Darfuri rebel group, was accused of responsibility for the attack on the African Union's peace mission in Haskanita (North-Darfur) on 29 September 2007. In the attack, 12 soldiers were allegedly killed and eight injured. Abu Garda denies the charge but reported voluntarily by stating that "every leader should co-operate with justice and observe the law". A summons was issued against Abu Garda, but no warrant of arrest. He was allowed to await the further proceedings while in liberty.

On 8 February 2010, Pre-Trial Chamber I of the Court ruled that there was insufficient evidence to proceed to trial on charges against Abu Garda. On 23 April 2010, the Chamber also declined the Prosecutor's application to appeal the decision. Under the Rome Statute, such a move to the Appeals Chamber can only be made once leave of the Pre-Trial Chamber has been granted. Both decisions do not preclude the prosecution from subsequently requesting the confirmation of the charges against Abu Garda if such a request is supported by additional evidence.

==== Abdallah Banda and Saleh Jerbo ====
On 16 June 2010, two other rebel leaders came voluntarily to the Court. Abdallah Banda Abakaer Nourain (Banda) and Saleh Mohammed Jerbo Jamus (Jerbo), leaders of small Darfuri rebel groups, are also charged with war crimes for their alleged roles in the attack in Haskanita described above.

Prosecutor Moreno Ocampo stated that their voluntary appearance was the culmination of months of efforts to secure their co-operation. On 17 June 2010, they faced Pre-Trial Chamber I, which ruled that there are reasonable grounds for their prosecution. Just as in the case against Abu Garda, the Prosecutor has not made a request for warrants of arrest against them.

Abdallah Banda Abakaer Nourain and Saleh Mohammed Jerbo Jamus appeared voluntarily before the court on 17 June 2010. On 7 March 2011, Pre-Trial Chamber I confirmed the charges against the two and committed them to trial.

The proceedings against Saleh Mohammed Jerbo Jamus terminated on 4 October 2013 due to his passing.

On 11 September 2014, the Trial Chamber judges issued an arrest warrant to ensure Banda's presence at trial. Banda is still at large, and trial will commence pending his arrest or voluntary appearance.

=== Kenya ===
On 31 March 2010, a Pre-Trial Chamber of the International Criminal Court authorized the Prosecutor to investigate the 2007–2008 Kenyan crisis. It was the first time the Prosecutor had requested such an authorization; all other investigations have been triggered by either the corresponding government or the United Nations Security Council.

On 15 December 2010, the Prosecutor applied for summonses to appear for six alleged perpetrators: In the first case, William Ruto, Henry Kiprono Kosgey and Joshua Arap Sang are to stand trial for crimes against PNU supporters whereas, in the second case, Francis Muthaura, Uhuru Muigai Kenyatta and Mohamed Hussein Ali are to stand trial for crimes against ODM supporters. On 8 March 2011, the Pre-Trial Chamber issued summonses for all six alleged perpetrators to appear before the Court on 7 and 8 April 2011 respectively.

=== Libya ===
As a consequence of the 2011 Libyan civil war and its brutal suppression, the UN Security Council voted unanimously, on 26 February 2011 in Resolution 1970, to refer the situation in Libya to the ICC. Other than the referral of the situation in Darfur, Sudan, to the ICC in March 2005, it was only the second time that the Security Council has referred a situation to the ICC and the first time that it has done so unanimously. China and the United States had abstained in 2005, but this time, they voted in favor of referral to the ICC.

On 3 March 2011, just five days after the referral of the situation, the Prosecutor opened an investigation. On 16 May 2011, the Prosecutor requested a Pre-Trial Chamber of the Court to issue warrants of arrest against Muammar Gaddafi; his son, Saif al-Islam; and the head of Libya's intelligence, Abdullah Senussi, for allegedly committed crimes against humanity. The request was granted on 27 June 2011, resulting in the second ICC warrant of arrest against an incumbent head of state, the other being Sudan's Omar al-Bashir.

=== Côte d'Ivoire ===
On 19 May 2011, the Prosecutor informed the Presidency of the Court of his intention to request the authorization to open a formal investigation into the situation in Côte d'Ivoire since 28 November 2010. A day later, the Presidency issued an order, assigning the situation to Pre-Trial Chamber II, which was modified on 22 June 2011 by establishing a Pre-Trial Chamber III and assigning the situation in Côte d'Ivoire to it.

On 23 June 2011, the Prosecutor formally requested the authorization from a Pre-Trial Chamber to begin an investigation into crimes allegedly committed in Côte d'Ivoire.

While Côte d'Ivoire was then not a state party to the Rome Statute, it had repeatedly, by different administrations, accepted the ICC's jurisdiction. It became a state party in February 2013.

On 3 October 2011, Pre-Trial Chamber III allowed an investigation to be conducted by the Prosecutor.

On 27 May 2015, the ICC ruled that it can prosecute Simone Gbagbo on charges including murder and rape linked to violence that left 3000 people dead in the aftermath of the country's disputed 2010 presidential election.

=== Mali ===
On 18 July 2012, the government of Mali had referred the situation there to the Prosecutor of the International Criminal Court. On 16 January 2013, the Prosecutor determined that there is a reasonable basis to believe that war crimes have been committed in the conflict so the Prosecutor opened an investigation.

=== Central African Republic II ===
On 12 June 2014, the government of the Central African Republic had referred the second situation there to the Prosecutor of the International Criminal Court. On 24 September 2014, the Prosecutor determined that there is a reasonable basis to believe that war crimes have been committed in the conflict so the Prosecutor opened an investigation.

=== Georgia ===
On 27 January 2016, the court opened an investigation into alleged war crimes and crimes against humanity committed during the Russo-Georgian War, from 1 July to 10 October 2008. The investigation focused on allegations of criminality in South Ossetia, a partially recognised state claimed by Georgia and occupied by the Russian military during the war. On 24 June 2022, the court issued arrest warrants for three South Ossetian officials, Mikhail Mindzaev, Hamlet Guchmazov and David Sanakoev, on suspicion of war crimes. These individuals are alleged to have orchestrated the illegal detention and torture of ethnic Georgian civilians residing in South Ossetia, before using them as hostages to compel Georgian authorities to agree to a prisoner exchange; as a result, Georgian hostages were expelled from South Ossetia. These individuals remain at large. On 16 December 2022, Prosecutor Karim Khan announced that the investigation had concluded.

=== State of Palestine ===
On 3 March 2021 prosecutor Fatou Bensouda announced the opening of an investigation respecting the situation in the State of Palestine. It considers alleged war crimes under the jurisdiction of the court that have been committed since 13 June 2014. After having requested a pre-trial jurisdictional ruling to first conform the territory within which the investigations may be conducted, the court found that the territorial scope of this jurisdiction extends to Gaza and the West Bank, including East Jerusalem.

=== Venezuela ===
On 4 November 2021 prosecutor Karim Khan announced the opening of an investigation regarding the situation in Venezuela.

== Preliminary examinations ==
In addition to the situations in which the Prosecutor has opened formal investigations, several other situations under "preliminary examination" have been closed out without resulting in a full investigation. As of March 2026, only the situation in Nigeria remains under preliminary examination.

Preliminary examinations into situations in Korea, Comoros (regarding the Israeli attack on three vessels involved in the Gaza flotilla raid), Honduras and Gabon were among those closed. In these cases, the Prosecutor concluded that no investigation would be initiated because the necessary requirements had not been met. With regard to the Israeli attack on the vessels of the Gaza flotilla raid, the Comoros appealed from the Prosecutor's decision. On 30 November 2017, this appeal was finally dismissed.

Preliminary examinations regarding Iraq and Venezuela were at some point closed but later on reopened. With regard to the 2003 invasion of Iraq, the Prosecutor published a letter responding to complaints he had received. He noted that "the International Criminal Court has a mandate to examine the conduct during the conflict, but not whether the decision to engage in armed conflict was legal", and that the court's jurisdiction is limited to the actions of nationals of states parties. He concluded that there was a reasonable basis to believe that a limited number of war crimes had been committed in Iraq, but that the crimes allegedly committed by nationals of states parties did not appear to meet the required gravity threshold for an ICC investigation. However, on 13 May 2014, the Prosecutor announced that preliminary examinations regarding the situation in Iraq are re-opened, due to communication received by the European Center for Constitutional and Human Rights regarding alleged war crimes by United Kingdom officials between 2003 and 2008.

== Other complaints received ==
As of end September 2010, the Office of the Prosecutor had received 8874 communications about alleged crimes. After initial review, 4002 of the communications were dismissed as "manifestly outside the jurisdiction of the Court".

== National proceedings under complementarity ==
The Court is designed to complement existing national judicial systems. It can exercise its jurisdiction only if national courts are unwilling or unable to investigate or prosecute. State parties are expected to implement national legislation to provide for the investigation and prosecution of crimes that fall under the jurisdiction of the Court.

=== Democratic Republic of the Congo ===
In February 2008, a military tribunal in Mbandaka sentenced Botuli Itofo, a policeman, to twenty years' imprisonment after his conviction under ICC implementing legislation for the crime against humanity of mass rape and other "serious human rights violations". Over 50 women and girls had expressed that they had been raped as a part of a "punitive operation" by police sent to the area to restore order in March 2006.

=== Germany ===
Under the German complementary law, crimes against humanity as defined in the Rome Statute can be prosecuted by German courts even if they are outside the jurisdiction of the court because they occur in a country that has not ratified the statute. That is under the principle of universal jurisdiction.

In December 2005, activists from Uzbekistan submitted a complaint against Uzbek Interior Minister Zokirjon Almatov in connection with the Andijan massacre. Almatov was visiting Germany at the time for hospital treatment. The prosecutor declined to act by saying chances of a successful prosecution were "non-existent" as the government of Uzbekistan would not co-operate in the gathering of evidence.

In May 2011, a trial against two alleged members of the FDLR began in Stuttgart, Germany. Ignace Murwanashyaka and Straton Musoni, both Rwandan citizens, are accused of 26 counts of crimes against humanity and 39 counts of war crimes, allegedly committed in the Democratic Republic of the Congo. It is the first trial in Germany under the Völkerstrafgesetzbuch in force since 2002.
