= Darfur genocide (2003–2005) =

Systematic murder of Darfuris in Sudan

- Part of the War in Darfur
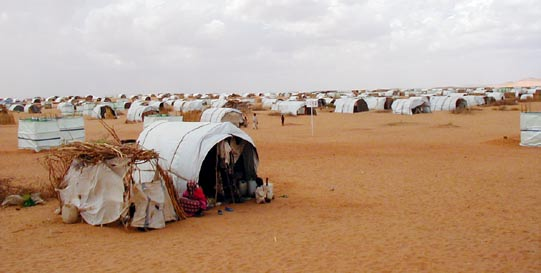
- Tent city of Darfuri refugees outside of El Fasher, 2004
- Location: Darfur, Sudan
- Date: 23 February 2003–2005
- Target: Darfuri from the Fur, Masalit and Zaghawa ethnic groups
- Attack type: Genocide, mass murder, genocidal rape, scorched earth, ethnic cleansing
- Deaths: 200,000 (2003–2005) 200,000–300,000 (2003–2008)
- Injuries: Unknown
- Victims: At least 9,300 women and men raped Over 3 million Darfuri people of various ethnicities affected in various ways
- Perpetrators: Sudan: Al-Bashir regime; Sudanese Armed Forces; Janjaweed; Muraheleen
- Motive: Anti-black racism, Arab supremacy

The Darfur genocide was the systematic killing of ethnic Darfuri people during the War in Darfur. The genocide, which was carried out against the Fur, Masalit and Zaghawa ethnic groups, led the International Criminal Court (ICC) to indict several people for crimes against humanity, rape, forced transfer and torture. An estimated 200,000 people were killed between 2003 and 2005. Other sources estimate that between 2003 and 2008, the conflict resulted in about 300,000 civilian deaths and about 2.7 million displaced civilians.

== Origins ==
=== Historical relations between ethnic groups ===
Throughout the history of the Darfur region, a combination of environmental, economic, and social factors contributed to the escalating tension that eventually resulted in the 2003 genocide. The region, home to six million people and numerous ethnic groups, historically contained two main communities with differing lifestyles and territorial claims. One group identified as Black Africans and primarily practiced sedentary agriculture, while the other identified as Arabs and tended to lead semi-nomadic, livestock-based livelihoods. Both categories include numerous sub-groups and have interacted for centuries through trade and shared governance structures.

Environmental changes in Darfur during the 1970s led to periods of severe drought and desertification. Many scholars consider the violence in Darfur to be the result of the region being one of the first "climate change conflicts" given the rising tensions over land and water resources between ethnic groups. As fertile land became scarcer, disputes between the herding and farming communities increased. These tensions often resulted in conflict, especially when traditional systems for managing land access and migration routes became strained.

In addition to environmental pressures, racial and cultural differences drove a divide between the groups. After Sudan gained independence from the United Kingdom in 1956, various conflicts broke out across the country, including the First Sudanese Civil War between the Arab-dominated northern government and the predominantly Black and Christian populations in the south. The 11-year conflict displaced more than a million people, many of whom fled to other parts of Sudan or neighboring countries, such as Chad. The majority of the displaced population consisted of Black individuals, whereas the Arabs received more support from the government. These conflicts, combined with limited state investment in western regions such as Darfur, increased the feelings of marginalization within some local communities. Over time, differences in language, identity, and access to state resources contributed to the politicization of ethnic identities within the region.

=== Rise in Arab nationalism ===
The independence of most African states in the mid-20th century led to a rise of Arab nationalism in various African countries, which had significant effects on Sudan and the Darfur region. In neighboring Libya, Muammar Gaddafi promoted Arab nationalist ideology and supported efforts to increase Arab political and cultural unity. Some of these ideas extended into Sudan, where various political and religious movements began to incorporate elements of Arab nationalism and Islamic governance into their ideology.

In Sudan, these developments coincided with the emergence of Islamist political parties and figures who gained prominence in the 1980s and 1990s. Gaddafi supported the Sudanese Muslim Brothers, a radical Islamist group that intended to establish an Arab Belt across the Sahel region. One of its leading figures, Hassan al-Turabi, became a key figure in Sudanese politics by promoting the integration of Islamic principles into state institutions and governance under Presidents Gaafar Nimeiry and Omar al-Bashir. Under Bashir's leadership, the government adopted policies that emphasized religious and cultural conservatism and intended to integrate Islamic law (Sharia) into the national legal system.

Some scholars and observers have argued that the increasing influence of Arab nationalism and radical Islamist ideologies contributed to the changing power dynamics in Sudan. In Darfur, the government created land policies and security strategies that provided more support and military assistance to Arab-identified militias, including the Janjaweed. The reasons for the government's support, and the extent to which racial and ideological factors contributed to the violence have been heavily debated among scholars and the international community.

The International Commission of Inquiry on Darfur, a report ordered by United Nations Secretary General Kofi Anan, investigated the causes and actions taken during the conflict. The 2004 report stated that the ethnic groups involved in the conflict were not significantly distinguishable from one another due to their shared religion and language, which many organizations and scholars contested. Regardless, the violence perpetrated by the Janjaweed represented both political and economic struggles and the tension between the cultural and ethnic identities in the Darfur region.

== Outbreak of conflict ==
By early 2003, the long-standing tensions in Darfur escalated into a civil war. Two rebels groups, the Justice and Equality Movement (JEM) and the Sudan Liberation Movement/Army (SLM/A), launched attacks against the Sudanese government forces in February 2003.

The Sudanese government responded to the attacks by organizing a counterinsurgency campaign. In addition to formal military operations, the government armed and supported local Arab militias, such as the Janjaweed. The militias carried out attacks across the region against members of the rebel groups and civilians who were seen as sympathetic to the rebel cause.

International organization and human rights groups raised concerns about the scale and nature of the violence, which disproportionately affected non-Arab communities in Darfur. While the Sudanese government stated that its actions intended to restore order and combat armed rebellion, several governments and international organizations later described the conflict as an act of genocide. By the end of 2005, thousands of people had been killed or displaced, and the situation in Darfur had attracted significant international attention and humanitarian intervention.

In 2013, the United Nations estimated that up to 300,000 people had been killed during the genocide; in response, the Sudanese government claimed that the number of deaths was "grossly inflated". By 2015, it was estimated that the death toll stood between 100,000 and 400,000.

The violence continued into 2016 when the government allegedly used chemical weapons against the local population in Darfur. This led to millions being displaced due to the hostile environment. Over three million lives have been heavily impacted by the conflict.

=== Ethnic violence and genocide ===
Numerous reports documented large-scale attacks on civilian populations, specifically in rural areas largely inhabited by non-Arab ethnic groups, such as the Fur, Masalit, and Zaghawa. The violence resulted in the burning of villages, forced displacement of populations, and the reporting of human rights abuses, including killings, sexual violence, and destruction of property. Am Boru was one of many villages destroyed during the conflict. The village previously resided in North Darfur as the main home of the Zaghawa community. However, the Janjaweed militias and Sudanese army destroyed the village, causing the population that survived to flee to refugee camps across the border into Chad.

== Major actors ==
=== Sudanese government ===
The central government in Khartoum, led by President Omar al-Bashir during the conflict, played a key role in directing the national response to the rebellion in Darfur. The Sudanese government denied organizing or coordinating specific attack on the non-Arab population and argued that it was conducting legitimate counterinsurgency operations against the JEM and SLM/A. However, various international reports accused the government of coordinating with militias involved in attacks on civilian populations.

=== Janjaweed militias ===
The term "Janjaweed" largely refers to Arab tribal militias accused of committing many of the human rights abuses during the conflict. Several reports stated that the militias received arms, logistical support, and other weaponry from the Sudanese military. Human rights organization and international observers attributed much of the violence to both the government forces and militia groups, especially the Janjaweed. The Janjaweed's actions and their relations with the Sudanese government faced international criticism and legal scrutiny related to the conflict.

=== Rebel groups ===
Two primary rebel groups emerged in the early 2000s: the Sudan Liberation Movement/Army and the Justice and Equality Movement. Both groups accused the central government in Khartoum of political and economic marginalization of Darfur's Black African communities. The groups rebelled for increased autonomy and development in Darfur. Internal divisions within the rebel movements eventually emerged, which led to fragmentation and the formation of splinter groups over time.

=== International organizations ===
Several international actors became involved in responding to the conflict, including the African Union, the United Nations (UN), and various humanitarian organizations. The international organization created peacekeeping missions, such as the African Union Mission in Sudan and eventually the joint United Nations-African Union Mission in Darfur, to monitor the conflict and provide protection for civilians. These missions and broader international aid faced many challenges due to a lack of resources and security risks.

== War crimes ==
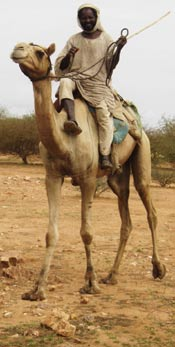
Arab Janjaweed militias have been a major player in the conflict.

The BBC first reported on the issue of ethnic cleansing in November 2003, and earlier that year in March. An administrator from the United States Agency for International Development giving testimony to congress mentioned ethnic cleansing and the "population clearance" which was occurring in Darfur.

In April 2004, Human Rights Watch (HRW) released Darfur Destroyed: Ethnic Cleansing by Government and Militia Forces in Western Sudan, a 77-page report compiled by HRW following 25 days spent in the region. The executive director of the African branch of HRW, Peter Takirambudde, stated: "There can be no doubt about the Sudanese government's culpability in crimes against humanity in Darfur".

=== Rape during the Darfur genocide ===
The use of rape as a tool of genocide has been noted. This crime has been carried out by Sudanese government forces and the Janjaweed ("evil men on horseback") paramilitary groups. The actions of the Janjaweed have been described as genocidal rape, with not just women, but children as well. The rapes reported have mostly occurred in non-Arab villages by the Janjaweed with the assistance of the Sudanese military.There were also reports of infants being bludgeoned to death, and reports of the sexual mutilation of victims.

The settings in which these attacks occurred:

1. The Janjaweed forces surrounded the village and then attacked girls and women who left the village to gather firewood or water.
2. The Janjaweed forces either went house to house, killing the boys and men while raping the girls and women or rounded up everyone, bringing them to a central location, where the forces then killed the boys and men then raped the girls and women.
3. The Janjaweed forces went to nearby villages or towns, internally displaced person (IDP) camps, or across the border into Chad to rape women and children.

According to Tara Gingerich and Jennifer Leaning, the rape attacks were often carried out in front of others "including husbands, fathers, mothers, and children of the victims, who were forced to watch and were prevented from intervening". This genocidal rape has been committed upon a wide age range, that includes women of 70 years or older, girls under 10, and pregnant women.

The missing women and girls have possibly been released but may have heretofore been unable to reunite with their families. In a statement to the UN, former secretary-general Kofi Annan said "In Darfur, we see whole populations displaced, and their homes destroyed, while rape is used as a deliberate strategy."

== International intervention ==
=== United Nations – African Union Hybrid Operation in Darfur (UNAMID) ===
The United Nations issued a hybrid United Nations-African Union mission (UNAMID) to maintain peace in Darfur. It was established on 31 July 2007 with the adoption of Security Council resolution 1769. However, it formally took over on 31 December 2007. The Mission's headquarters is in El Fasher, North Darfur. It has sector headquarters in El Geneina (West Darfur), Nyala (South Darfur), Zalingei (Central Darfur) and Ed Daein (East Darfur). The Mission has 35 deployment locations throughout the five Darfur states.

The African Union and the United Nations (UN) produced a framework document for intensive diplomatic and political peacekeeping efforts. Sudan's acceptance of the African Union Hybrid Operation in Darfur derived from intensive negotiations by Secretary-General of the United Nations Ban Ki-moon and several actors in the international community. According to the UNAMID website, "the mandate is renewed yearly, and the adoption of Security Council Resolution 2296 extended it until 30 June 2017."

The peacekeeping mission is confronted with several challenges from security to logistical constraints. The troops that have been deployed operate in unforgiving, complex, and often hostile political environments. Also, the missions are faced with many shortages in equipment, infrastructure, transportation, and aviation assets. As the budget of UNAMID is $1,039,573.2 for the fiscal year 2016–2017.

Yet, with the limited resources and hostile environment, the troops still manage to provide protection to the locals in Darfur and assist the progress of the humanitarian aid operation. UNAMID contributes to promote peace, address the critical roots of the conflict and help end the violence considering "the mission carries out more than 100 patrols daily".

The peacekeepers facilitate cooperation and maintain peace by:

- Protecting civilians without prejudice to the responsibility of the Government of Sudan.
- Delivering humanitarian assistance by UN agencies and other aid actors and the safety and security of humanitarian personnel.
- Intervening between the Government of Sudan and non-signatory movements.
- Resolving community conflict through measures of addressing its root causes.

The mission had an authorized strength of 25,987 uniformed peacekeepers on 31 July 2007. The operation included 19,555 troops, 360 military observers and liaison officers, 3,772 police advisers and 2,660 formed police units (FPU).

In mid-2011, UNAMID stood at 90 percent of its full authorized strength, making it one of the largest UN peacekeeping operations.

=== 2018 ===
Although violence is still occurring in Darfur, it is at a low level and the region is increasingly stable. The UNAMID forces are exiting as there had been a reduction to the number of troops deployed to Darfur.

The Deputy Secretary-General of the United Nations Amina Mohammed states:

"We have invested $16 billion in peacekeeping alone over the past ten years, in addition to humanitarian funding and bilateral aid to alleviate the suffering of the population. As the region recovers from war, now is the time to consolidate gains," she said, adding that it was time to "step up and make sure Darfur moves towards peace and prosperity."

== Reactions ==
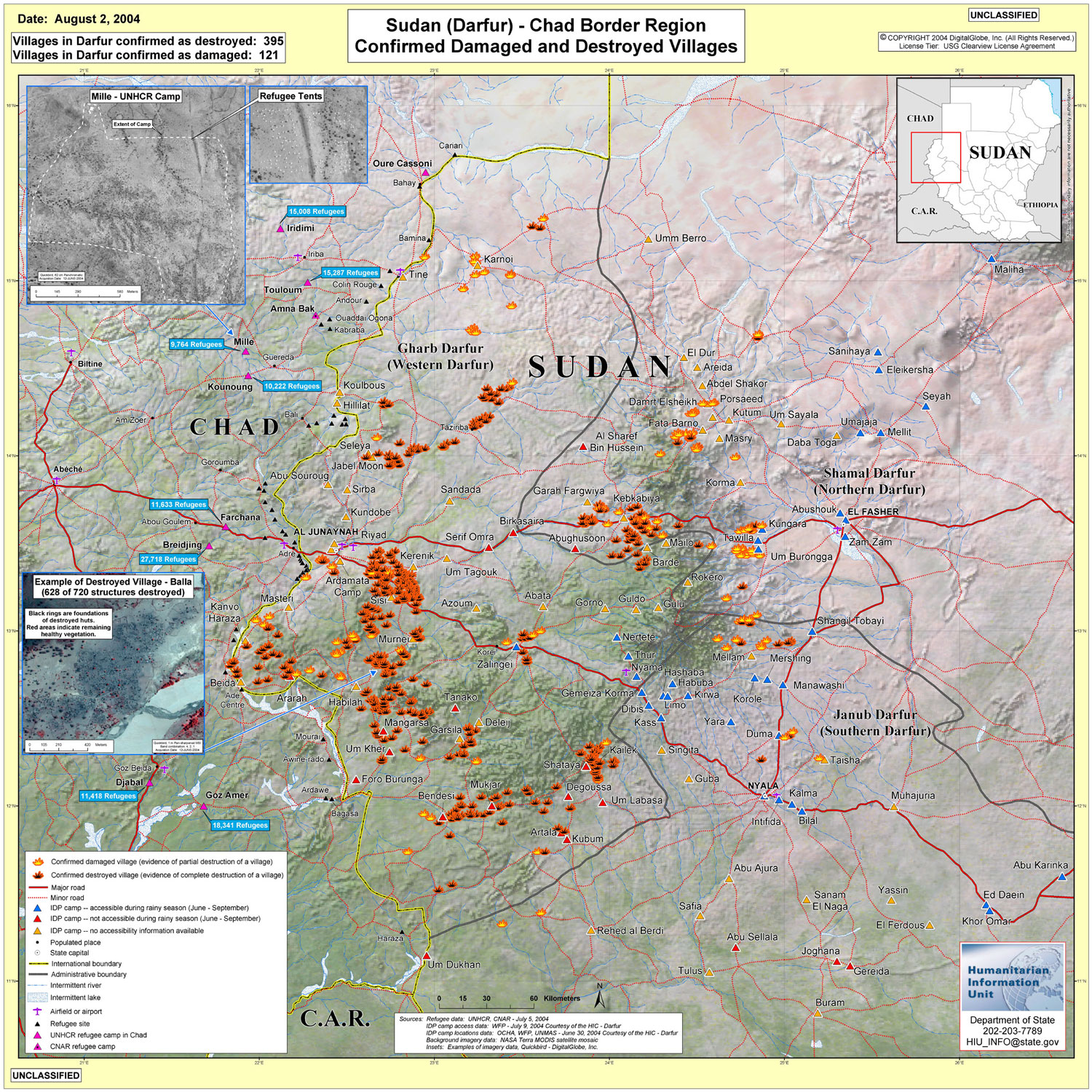
Destroyed villages (August 2004)

In 2007, a former employee of Google, Andria Ruben McCool, conceived the idea of using the high resolution imagery from Google Earth to map what was occurring in Darfur. The project was titled Crisis in Darfur and is run by the United States Holocaust Memorial Museum in partnership with Google Earth. The software allows users to zoom in on the region, and users were able to see over 1600 destroyed and damaged villages. Mark Tarn writing in the Guardian describes the images as "dramatic" as the area is marked by red and yellow icons which he says "graphically conveys the mayhem that has been inflicted on the people of the region."

In 2004, Colin Powell told the state committee on foreign affairs that genocide had been carried out in Darfur, that the Sudanese government and the Janjaweed were responsible, and that the genocide may still be ongoing. Powell stated that having reviewed the evidence which had been compiled by the State Department and having compared it to information that was freely available throughout the international community he came to the conclusion that genocide had been carried out in Darfur.

On September 21, 2004, during the Senate Foreign Relations convention, Powell said:

"In July, we launched a limited investigation by sending a team to visit the refugee camps in Chad to talk to refugees and displaced persons. The team … were able to interview 1136 of the 2.2 million people the UN estimates have been affected by this horrible situation."

"Those interviews indicated: … a consistent and widespread pattern of atrocities: Killings, rapes, burning of villages committed by jingaweit and government forces against non-Arab villagers; three-fourths of those interviewed reported that the Sudanese military forces were involved in the attacks; … [villages] often experienced multiple attacks over a prolonged period before they were destroyed by burning, shelling or bombing, making it impossible for the villagers to return to their villages. This was a coordinated effort, not just random violence."

"When we reviewed the evidence compiled by our team, and then put it beside other information available to the State Department and widely known throughout the international community, widely reported upon by the media and by others, we concluded, I concluded, that genocide has been committed in Darfur and that the Government of Sudan and the Jingaweit bear responsibility-and that genocide may still be occurring."

Powell concluded by announcing that at the next UN Security Council Resolution an investigation on all violations of international humanitarian law and human rights will occur in Darfur, Sudan with a view to ensuring accountability.

In a speech delivered on May 29, 2007, U.S. President George W. Bush confirmed that the situation in Darfur was a genocide. Citing Sudanese President Omar al-Bashir's failure to cooperate, he announced tightened economic sanctions on Sudan and that he would pursue a United Nations Security Council resolution to impose additional sanctions, including prohibiting the Sudanese government from conducting military flights over Darfur. He urged the United Nations, the African Union, and other members of the international community to not obstruct the steps being taken to restore peace to Darfur and called upon President Bashir to cooperate with peacekeeping forces and stop the killings of innocent people in Darfur.

According to Rebecca Joyce Frey, the international community has taken the same stance with regards to Darfur as it did with the Rwandan genocide, that of an "outside observer" or "bystander." Joyce Frey also argues that Bashir, as well as other leaders, have realized that the lack of intervention in Rwanda from the international community gives them free rein to continue the genocide without them having any serious concerns over international intervention.

Nicholas Kristof, writing in the New York Times, has claimed China "is financing, diplomatically protecting and supplying the arms for the first genocide of the 21st century" in Darfur. (Note: The Bambuti genocide predates the Darfur genocide.)

China was seen as an enabler for President Bashir's resistance to UN deployment and international attention. China did press Sudan to accept the UN deployments in Darfur; however, China had also supplied Khartoum with weapons and had the power to single-handedly veto resolutions of the United Nations Security Council. China's primary goal is not achieving better human rights practices in the abstract but satisfying Darfur's basic needs for food, shelter, and security.

In a 176-page report carried out by the International Commission of Inquiry on Darfur to the United Nations Secretary-General, the Commission determined that the Government of Sudan did not intentionally pursue policies that would lead to genocide. The Commission "found that government forces and militias conducted indiscriminate attacks, including killing of civilians, torture, enforced disappearances, destruction of villages, rape and other forms of sexual violence, pillaging and forced displacement, throughout Darfur." The Commission concluded, however, that "[t]he crucial element of genocidal intent appears to be missing, at least as far as the central government authorities are concerned." The Commission goes on to say that the war crimes and crimes against humanity that occurred in Darfur are just as important as if the situation were determined to be a genocide.

The Save Darfur Coalition, as David Lanz discusses in his article, "Save Darfur: A Movement and Its Discontents", was one of the biggest international social movements and had significant impacts on how the world reacted to Darfur. Some of the achievements that Lanz attributes to the Save Darfur Coalition, that became extremely popular in the United States, was the change in rhetoric from the government. Lanz attributes Colin Powell's consideration of the Darfur Crisis as a genocide as one of the movement's biggest achievements. One other accomplishment that Save Darfur claims responsibility for was their vital role in lobbying the UN Security Council for their referral of Darfur to the ICC.

In the United States, the Save Darfur movement got the attention of many celebrities, most notably Angelina Jolie, Brad Pitt, George Clooney, Mia Farrow and Richard Branson. In 2007, actors Angelina Jolie and Brad Pitt made a US$1M donation through their Jolie-Pitt Foundation to three agencies—the UN refugee agency; the International Rescue Committee, and SOS Children's Villages—working with displaced people and refugees from Darfur. According to The Guardian, actor George Clooney has been credited with using his celebrity to help bring the Darfur Crisis onto the world stage. In 2009, both the actress Mia Farrow and the British billionaire Richard Branson also went on hunger strikes in solidarity with the people in Darfur. Farrow has repeatedly travelled to the region, both to the Darfur region as well as to Eastern Chad where many of the refugees from Western Sudan have fled. From 2003 to 2011, Farrow filmed 35 hours of songs, dances, stories, and other elements of Darfuri culture so that it may be preserved; she donated the videos to the University of Connecticut's Dodd Center for Human Rights in 2011.

== Proceedings of the ICC ==
Initially the ICC refused to add the charge of genocide to the indictment for the President of Sudan, Omar Bashir; however, following an appeal this decision was overturned. The trial chamber found that there were "reasonable grounds to believe him responsible for three counts of genocide".

On 14 July 2009, the ICC issued an indictment for Omar Bashir for crimes against humanity and for having facilitated and ordered the genocide in Darfur. On 12 July 2010 the ICC issued a second indictment for the arrest of al-Bashir for genocide, this was the first instance of the ICC issuing an arrest warrant for the crime of genocide. As well as Bashir, another six suspects have been indicted by the court, Ahmed Haroun, Ali Kushayb, Bahar Abu Garda, Abdallah Banda, Saleh Jerbo, Abdel Rahim Mohammed Hussein. On June 9, 2020, Kushayb was taken into custody by the International Criminal Court in The Hague. His trial began on April 5, 2022.

Luis Moreno-Ocampo, prosecutor for the ICC having filed charges for crimes against humanity, is also pursuing in his application the charge of genocidal rape as such actions can be tried before the ICC as stand-alone crimes.

On February 11, 2020, the government of Sudan agreed that former president Omar al-Bashir will face war crime charges before the ICC. The commitment came during peace talks with rebel groups.

ICC prosecutor Karim Ahmad Khan confirmed that both Sudan's regular army and the paramilitary Rapid Support Forces (RSF) committed war crimes in Darfur, with a focus on past atrocities in El Geneina. A U.N. report estimated 10,000–15,000 deaths, and the U.S. formally declared war crimes and humanitarian crises, resulting in millions being displaced.

== Darfur refugee camps ==
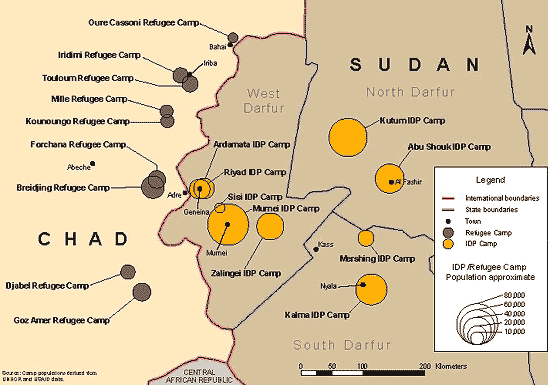
Darfur refugee camps

The citizens in Darfur who have fled the genocide in Sudan—and continue to flee today—settle in one of the 13 refugee camps in Eastern Chad. About 360,000 Darfuris suffer in those camps: "The 10+ years they have lived in the camps have been marked by tight resources, threats from inside and outside the camps, and more, but life is getting even harder for the refugees."

UNHCR proposed to the UN Secretary-General to "take responsibility for the protection and voluntary return of IDPs to their villages of origin in West Darfur in partnership with other agencies…". The UN approved of their proposal to govern and create a protective environment in camps, host communities and settlements for the displaced people to a within Darfur.

There have been funding shortfalls which impacted the increase in the refugees and internally displaced persons. The environment and lack of exceptional living conditions is not able to accommodate the refugee community.

As of 2018, a group of refugees that have been in Chad since 2003–2004 are returning to North Darfur. They are the first of thousands who are expected to return voluntarily to Darfur in the coming months. The refugees are provided with transport and packages which include three months of food rations, provided by the World Food Programme (WFP). As the peace and security situation is maintained in Darfur, more refugees will want to return to Sudan.

== Media and popular culture ==
=== Films ===
The documentary The Devil Came on Horseback (2007), focuses on the violence and tragedy of the genocide happening in Darfur. The story is seen through the eyes of an American who returns home to make the story public using the images and stories of lives systematically destroyed.

In 2009, Uwe Boll, a director and producer, released a movie named Attack on Darfur. The story centers on American journalists visiting Sudan to interview the locals about the ongoing conflict. They are confronted with the atrocities the Janjaweed caused in which they try their best to stop the killings and help the villagers faced with genocide.

Filmmaker Ted Braun examines the genocide in Darfur, Sudan. Alongside Hotel Rwanda star Don Cheadle, the film Darfur Now (2007) is a call to action for people all over the world to help the ongoing crisis in Darfur.

Sand And Sorrow: A New Documentary about Darfur (2007) is a documentary film about the ongoing Darfur conflict. Interviews and footage of human right activist John Prendergast, Harvard professor Samantha Power and New York Times columnist Nicholas Kristof are shown to depict the origins and the aftermath of the conflict between the Arab and non-Arab tribes in the Darfur region.

== See also ==
- Dar Erenga
- Darfur genocide (2023–present)
- El Fasher massacre – Massacre of civilians in Sudan since 2025
- Human rights in Sudan
- List of massacres in Sudan
- Masalit massacres – Ongoing genocide in West Darfur, Sudan
- Politics of Sudan
- War crimes during the Sudanese civil war (2023–present)

== Works cited ==
- "UN: 460,000 displaced in Darfur this year". Al Jazeera. 14 November 2013. Archived from the original on 13 June 2024.
- "Darfur warrant for Sudan's Bashir: ICC adds genocide". BBC News. 12 July 2010. Archived from the original on 20 November 2023.
- Daly, M. W. (2010). Darfur's Sorrow: The Forgotten History of a Humanitarian Disaster (2nd ed.). Cambridge University Press. ISBN 978-0-521-83833-7.
- Hagan, John; Rymond-Richmond, Wenona; Parker, Patricia (2005). "The Criminology of Genocide: The Death and Rape of Darfur" (PDF). Criminology. 43 (3): 525–562. doi:10.1111/j.0011-1348.2005.00016.x.
- Hashim, Nadra O. (2009). Language and Collective Mobilization: The Story of Zanzibar. Lexington Books. ISBN 978-0-7391-2211-2.
- Hirsch, Michele Lent (8 February 2012). "Darfur-Sudan". Women Under Siege.
- Human Rights Watch (7 May 2004). "Sudan: Government Commits 'Ethnic Cleansing' in Darfur". Human Rights Watch. Archived from the original on 4 March 2024.
- Human Rights Watch (13 July 2010). "Sudan: ICC Warrant for Al-Bashir on Genocide". Human Rights Watch. Archived from the original on 22 May 2024.
- Joyce Frey, Rebecca (2009). Genocide and International Justice. Facts On File. ISBN 978-0-8160-7310-8.
- January, Brendan (2007). Genocide: Modern Crimes Against Humanity. Twenty-First Century Books. ISBN 978-0-7613-3421-7.
- Kelly, Michael J.; Moreno-Ocampo, Luis (2016). Prosecuting Corporations for Genocide. Oxford University Press. ISBN 978-0-19-023889-6.
- Lefkow, Leslie (6 May 2004). Darfur Destroyed: Ethnic Cleansing by Government and Militia Forces in Western Sudan (Report). Vol. 16. Human Rights Watch. Archived from the original on 3 February 2025.
- Markusen, Eric (2009). "Three Empirical Investigations of Alleged Genocide in Darfur". In Grzyb, Amanda (ed.). The World and Darfur, Response to Crimes Against Humanity in Western Sudan. McGill-Queen's University Press. p. 99. ISBN 978-0-7735-3535-0.
- Phares, Walid (2010). The Coming Revolution: Struggle for Freedom in the Middle East. Simon & Schuster. ISBN 978-1-4391-7837-9.
- Rothe, Dawn (2009). State Criminality: The Crime of All Crimes. Lexington Books. ISBN 978-0-7391-2672-1.
- Prunier, Gérard (2006). "The Politics of Death in Darfur". Current History. 105 (691): 195–202. ISSN 0011-3530. JSTOR 45318776.
- Straus, Scott (2005). "Darfur and the Genocide Debate". Foreign Affairs. 84 (1): 123–133. doi:10.2307/20034212. JSTOR 20034212.
- Straus, Scott (2015). Making and Unmaking Nations: War, Leadership, and Genocide in Modern Africa. Cornell University Press. p. 233. ISBN 978-0-8014-7968-7.
- Scheffer, David (3 November 2008). "Rape as genocide". The New York Times.
- Totten, Samuel (2008). "The Darfur Genocide". In Totten, Samuel; Parsons, William S. (eds.). Century of Genocide: Critical Essays and Eyewitness Accounts (3rd ed.). New York: Routledge. doi:10.4324/9780203890431. ISBN 978-0-203-89043-1.
- Tran, Mark (2007-04-11). "Mapping the Darfur conflict". The Guardian.
