= International Criminal Court investigation in Darfur =

Situation in Darfur
- The seal of the International Criminal Court
- File no.: 02/05
- Referred by: UN Security Council
- Date referred: 31 March 2005
- Date opened: 6 June 2005
- Incident(s): War in Darfur (Raids on Haskanita); Sudanese civil war (2023–present)
- Crimes: Genocide: · Causing serious bodily or mental harm · Deliberately inflicting conditions calculated to destroy · Killing members of the group Crimes against humanity: · Extermination · Forcible transfer · Inhumane acts · Imprisonment · Murder · Persecution · Rape · Torture; War crimes: · Attacks against civilians · Destruction of property · Murder · Outrage upon dignity · Pillaging · Rape

Status of suspects
- Ahmed Haroun: Fugitive
- Ali Kushayb: Found guilty of war crimes and crimes against humanity on 6 October 2025
- Omar al-Bashir: Fugitive
- Bahar Abu Garda: Charges not confirmed
- Abdallah Banda: Charges withdrawn
- Saleh Jerbo: Case dropped due to death
- Abdel Rahim Mohammed Hussein: Fugitive

The International Criminal Court investigation in Darfur or the situation in Darfur is an ongoing investigation by the International Criminal Court (ICC) into criminal acts committed during the War in Darfur. Although Sudan is not a state party to the Rome Statute, the treaty which created the ICC, the situation in Darfur was referred to the ICC's Prosecutor by the United Nations Security Council in 2005. As of June 2019, five suspects remained under indictment by the court: Ahmed Haroun, Ali Kushayb, Omar al-Bashir, Abdallah Banda and Abdel Rahim Mohammed Hussein. Charges against Bahar Abu Garda were dropped on the basis of insufficient evidence in 2010 and those against Saleh Jerbo were dropped following his death in 2013. In mid-April 2019, Haroun, al-Bashir and Hussein were imprisoned in Sudan as a result of the 2019 Sudanese coup d'état. In early November 2019, the Forces of Freedom and Change (FFC) and Sudanese Prime Minister Abdalla Hamdok stated that al-Bashir would be transferred to the ICC. One of the demands of the displaced people of Darfur visited by Hamdok prior to Hamdok's statement was that "Omar Al Bashir and the other wanted persons" had to be surrendered to the ICC.

== Background ==
The Darfur conflict was a guerrilla conflict that took place in the Darfur region of Sudan from 2003 until 2009–2010. The conflict began when the Sudan Liberation Army and the Justice and Equality Movement began attacking the Sudanese government in response to perceived oppression of black Sudanese by the majority Arab government. During the conflict government forces and Janjaweed militia have attacked black Sudanese in the Darfur region. These actions have been described as genocide by a number of governments and human rights groups. Omar al-Bashir, Sudan's president at the time, denied that his government had links to Janjaweed.

== Referral ==
The International Criminal Court only has jurisdiction to investigate alleged crimes which have taken place in states or by the nationals of states that are party to the Rome Statute or that have accepted the Court's jurisdiction. Additionally, a situation can be referred to the ICC's Chief Prosecutor by the UN Security Council. In the case of Darfur, the Security Council referred the situation on 31 March 2005 after the passage of Resolution 1593. The resolution was passed by a vote of 11 in favor and zero against, with four abstentions. Argentina, Benin, Denmark, France, Greece, Japan, the Philippines, Romania, Russia, Tanzania, and the United Kingdom voted in favor and Algeria, Brazil, China, and the United States abstained.

The Prosecutor, Luis Moreno Ocampo, formally opened an investigation on 6 June 2005.

== Charges ==
As of June 2019, five people remained under ICC indictment for genocide, crimes against humanity and war crimes. Among these, Haroun, al-Bashir, and Hussein were held in detention by Sudanese authorities, with an international legal obligation of either being transferred to the ICC or of being prosecuted for the same charges in Sudan under appropriate legal procedures.

=== Closed cases ===
Charges against Bahr Idriss Abu Garda were dropped in late 2009 and the Prosecutor's appeal against this was rejected on 23 April 2010. Evidence for Saleh Jerbo having died on 19 April 2013 was accepted by the court and the case against him was closed without prejudice.

=== Ahmed Haroun and Ali Kushayb ===
Ahmed Haroun was formerly Minister of State for the Interior in the Government of Sudan and later the Minister of State for Humanitarian Affairs. He is alleged to have commanded the "Darfur security desk" which coordinated the counterinsurgency in Darfur and provided arms to the Janjaweed. Ali Muhammad Ali Abd-Al-Rahman, or Ali Kushayb, was allegedly the leader of the Janjaweed. Haroun and Kushayb were charged with the total of 51 counts of war crimes and crimes against humanity against the Fur people.

The first nine counts concern attacks in and around the Kodoom villages from or around 15 August 2003 to or around 31 August 2003. Counts 10 to 20 concern attacks in and around the town of Bindisi from or around 15 August 2003 to or around 31 August 2003. Counts 21 to 37 concern attacks in and around the town of Mukjar in or around August 2003, September 2003, October 2003, December 2003, and March 2004. Counts 38 to 51 concern attacks in and around the town of Arawala in or around December 2003. Haroun is charged with 20 counts of crimes against humanity and 22 counts of war crimes while Kushayb is charged with 22 counts of crimes against humanity and 28 counts of war crimes. War crimes are listed below WC and crimes against humanity as CAH. The statute column contains the reference to the crime in the articles of the Rome Statute.

Count	CAH	WC	Crime	Statute	Haroun	Kushayb
1	✓	✗	Persecution	Article 7(1)(h)	✓	✓
2	✓	✗	Murder	Article 7(1)(a)	✓	✓
3	✗	✓	Murder	Article 8(2)(c)(i)	✓	✓
4	✓	✗	Murder	Article 7(1)(a)	✓	✓
5	✗	✓	Murder	Article 8(2)(c)(i)	✓	✓
6	✗	✓	Attack against a civilian population	Article 8(2)(e)(i)	✓	✓
7	✗	✓	Attack against a civilian population	Article 8(2)(e)(i)	✗	✓
8	✗	✓	Destruction of property	Article 8(2)(e)(xii)	✓	✓
9	✓	✗	Forcible transfer of a population	Article 7(1)(d)	✓	✓
10	✓	✗	Persecution	Article 7(1)(h)	✓	✓
11	✓	✗	Murder	Article 7(1)(a)	✓	✓
12	✗	✓	Murder	Article 8(2)(c)(i)	✓	✓
13	✓	✗	Rape	Article 7(1)(g)	✓	✓
14	✗	✓	Rape	Article 8(2)(e)(vi)	✓	✓
15	✗	✓	Attack against a civilian population	Article 8(2)(e)(i)	✓	✓
16	✗	✓	Attack against a civilian population	Article 8(2)(e)(i)	✗	✓
17	✓	✗	Inhumane acts	Article 7(1)(k)	✓	✓
18	✗	✓	Pillaging	Article 8(2)(e)(v)	✓	✓
19	✗	✓	Destruction of property	Article 8(2)(e)(xii)	✓	✓
20	✓	✗	Forcible transfer of a population	Article 7(1)(d)	✓	✓
21	✓	✗	Persecution	Article 7(1)(h)	✓	✓
22	✓	✗	Murder	Article 7(1)(a)	✓	✓
23	✗	✓	Murder	Article 8(2)(c)(i)	✓	✓
24	✓	✗	Murder	Article 7(1)(a)	✓	✓
25	✓	✗	Murder	Article 7(1)(a)	✗	✓
26	✗	✓	Murder	Article 8(2)(c)(i)	✓	✓
27	✗	✓	Murder	Article 8(2)(c)(i)	✗	✓
28	✓	✗	Murder	Article 7(1)(a)	✓	✓
29	✓	✗	Murder	Article 7(1)(a)	✗	✓
30	✗	✓	Murder	Article 8(2)(c)(i)	✓	✓
31	✗	✓	Murder	Article 8(2)(c)(i)	✗	✓
32	✗	✓	Attack against a civilian population	Article 8(2)(e)(i)	✓	✓
33	✗	✓	Attack against a civilian population	Article 8(2)(e)(i)	✗	✓
34	✓	✗	Imprisonment or severe deprivation of liberty	Article 7(1)(e)	✓	✓
35	✓	✗	Torture	Article 7(1)(f)	✓	✓
36	✗	✓	Pillaging	Article 8(2)(e)(v)	✓	✓
37	✗	✓	Destruction of property	Article 8(2)(e)(xii)	✓	✗
38	✓	✗	Persecution	Article 7(1)(h)	✓	✓
39	✓	✗	Murder	Article 7(1)(a)	✓	✓
40	✗	✓	Murder	Article 8(2)(c)(i)	✓	✓
41	✓	✗	Rape	Article 7(1)(g)	✓	✓
42	✗	✓	Rape	Article 8(2)(e)(vi)	✓	✓
43	✗	✓	Attack against a civilian population	Article 8(2)(e)(i)	✓	✓
44	✗	✓	Attack against a civilian population	Article 8(2)(e)(i)	✓	✓
45	✗	✓	Outrage upon personal dignity	Article 8(2)(c)(ii)	✗	✓
46	✗	✓	Outrage upon personal dignity	Article 8(2)(c)(ii)	✓	✓
47	✗	✓	Outrage upon personal dignity	Article 8(2)(c)(ii)	✗	✓
48	✓	✗	Inhumane acts	Article 7(1)(k)	✓	✓
49	✗	✓	Pillaging	Article 8(2)(e)(v)	✓	✓
50	✗	✓	Destruction of property	Article 8(2)(e)(xii)	✓	✓
51	✓	✗	Forcible transfer of a population	Article 7(1)(d)	✓	✓

As of June 2019, Haroun was held in detention by Sudanese authorities. Kushayb was located in Rahad el-Berdi in South Darfur in December 2017, where he was accused by Salamat tribe leaders of an attempted murder. On 9 June 2020, Kushayb was taken into custody by the International Criminal Court in The Hague. His trial began on 5 April 2022.

On 6 October 2025, in the first conviction of the Darfur investigation, Kushayb was found guilty of 27 of the charges. The convictions included responsibility for gender-based crimes, including rape as a war crime and a crime against humanity.

=== Omar al-Bashir ===
Omar al-Bashir was President of Sudan from 30 June 1989 to 11 April 2019. He was indicted on 4 March 2009 with five counts of crimes against humanity and two counts of war crimes:

1. Attack against a civilian population, constituting a war crime in violation of article 8(2)(e)(i) of the Rome Statute;
2. Pillaging, constituting a war crime in violation of article 8(2)(e)(v) of the Rome Statute;
3. Murder, constituting a crime against humanity in violation of article 7(1)(a) of the Rome Statute;
4. Extermination, constituting a crime against humanity in violation of article 7(1)(b) of the Rome Statute;
5. Forcible transfer of a population, constituting a crime against humanity in violation of article 7(1)(d) of the Rome Statute;
6. Torture, constituting a crime against humanity in violation of article 7(1)(f) of the Rome Statute;
7. Rape, constituting a crime against humanity in violation of article 7(1)(g) of the Rome Statute.

On 12 July 2010 he was additionally charged with three counts of genocide:

1. Killing, constituting a crime of genocide in violation of article 6(a) of the Rome Statute;
2. Causing serious bodily of mental harm, constituting a crime of genocide in violation of article 6(b) of the Rome Statute;
3. Deliberately inflicting conditions of life calculated to bring about physical destitution, constituting a crime of genocide in violation of article 6(c) of the Rome Statute.

As of June 2019, al-Bashir was held in detention by Sudanese authorities on corruption charges. In August 2020, Prime Minister Abdalla Hamdok stated that the government was willing to cooperate with the ICC in the trial of al-Bashir. As of May 2022, al-Bashir was still at large, and not within ICC custody.

=== Abdallah Banda ===
As of June 2019, Abdallah Banda, Commander-in-Chief of the Justice and Equality Movement (JEM), remained a fugitive, indicted by the ICC. In July 2026, the Prosecution withdrew all charges and the case against Banda was closed.

=== Abdel Rahim Mohammed Hussein ===
Abdel Rahim Mohammed Hussein, former Governor of Khartoum State, indicted by the ICC, was imprisoned in Sudan in late April 2019 following the 2019 Sudanese coup d'état.

== Sudanese court ==
On 21 January 2020, in the Darfur track of the 2019–2020 component of Sudanese peace process negotiations, the Sudan Revolutionary Front (SRF) and Sovereignty Council representatives agreed on the creation in the Sudanese legal system of a Darfur war crimes court to be created in the Sudanese legal system for trying Darfur war crimes and crimes against humanity suspects. The SRF and the Sovereignty Council agreed to create a commission that would establish the court.
