= Wadi Salih =

Wadi Salih is a province of Central Darfur state of Sudan. It is South of Zalingei. It is between Mukjar and Habillah regions.

Traditionally in the homeland of the Fur tribe, Wadi Salih is predominantly Furawi with estimates up to 90% with the other 10% being some other tribes such as the Dajo tribe in the east of Wadi Salih.

Garsila is the biggest town in Wadi Salih with it housing up to as high as 7,000 people until the early 2000s, which was during the time the Darfur Genocide took place which caused people to flee.

On March 5, 2004, at least 145 people were killed by Janjaweed forces.

In late 2025, satellite imagery showed that many of the town’s markets and most of its homes were empty, with little sign of human activity.
