= Ahmed Haroun =

Sudanese politician (born 1964)

Governor Ahmed Haroun
- أحمد هارون

Governor of North Kordofan
- In office 14 July 2013 – 23 February 2019
- Preceded by: Muatassim Mirghani Hussein Zaki al-Din

Governor of South Kordofan
- In office May 2009 – 12 July 2013
- Preceded by: Omar Silaman
- Succeeded by: Adam al-Faki Mohamed al-Tayeb

Minister of State for Humanitarian Affairs
- In office 2006–2009
- Succeeded by: Mutrif Siddiq

Minister of State for the Interior
- In office April 2003 – September 2005
- Succeeded by: Alio Abini Alio

Personal details
- Born: 1964 (age 61–62) North Kurdufan, Republic of Sudan
- Party: National Congress
- Occupation: Politician
- Known for: wanted by ICC for war crimes

Military service
- Allegiance: Sudan
- Battles/wars: Second Sudanese Civil War; War in Darfur; Heglig Crisis

Ahmed Mohammed Haroun also spelled Ahmad Harun, (Arabic: أحمد محمد هارون; born 1964) is a Sudanese politician and one of five Sudanese men wanted by the International Criminal Court (ICC) for war crimes and crimes against humanity in Darfur. Despite international pressure on the government of Sudan to surrender him to the ICC, Haroun served as Sudan's Minister of State for Humanitarian Affairs until May 2009, when he was appointed to the governorship of South Kordofan. In September 2007, he was appointed to lead an investigation into human rights violations in Darfur. In July 2013 he resigned as Governor of South Kordofan, and was reappointed by Omar al-Bashir as Governor of North Kordofan. On 1 March 2019, President Omar al-Bashir handed over the running of the country's leading political party, the National Congress, to him. He was arrested in April 2019 by local authorities in Sudan following a coup which overthrew al-Bashir.

== Early life and education ==
Born in 1964, Haroun is from the state of North Kordofan. He comes from the Bargo tribe in western Sudan. He was trained as a lawyer.

== Career and allegations ==
At one time Haroun was Sudan's youngest minister of state. He is also accused of participating in mobilizing and training tribal militias to attack civilians during the counterinsurgency in South Sudan. He also participated in the mobilization of the Murahileen militia and the conduct of military operations in Kordofan during the 1990s.

During the time Haroun served as the minister of state for interior affairs, from April 2003 to September 2005, he also managed the Darfur Security Desk, which coordinated different government bodies involved in the counterinsurgency campaign in Darfur, such as the police, the Janjaweed, the Armed Forces, and the Intelligence Service. This department also managed access of NGOs and the media to Darfur. From 2006 to 2009, he was the minister of state for humanitarian affairs.

== Alleged criminal activity in Darfur ==
Haroun allegedly recruited, funded and armed the Janjaweed militia, and incited numerous attacks against civilian populations.

Forces under his command have been accused on targeting the towns of Kodoom, Bindisi, Mukjar, Arawala and surrounding areas during 2003 and 2004, even though these towns were apparently devoid of rebel presence and the civilian population was not taking part in hostilities. According to BBC News, Haroun ordered the militia to kill, rape, and torture civilians. Haroun has denied the accusations, and was quoted as saying the violence "never happened in the first place." Haroun was reported as having said that since the "children of the Fur had become rebels, 'all the Fur' had become 'booty' for the Janjaweed." After his speech, the Janjaweed militia, under the command of Ali Kushayb, looted the towns between Bindisi and Mukjar, and terrorized civilians.

Haroun supposedly declared in one of his meetings that as the head of security he had the authority to eliminate or pardon anyone in order to maintain peace and safety.

In August 2003, Haroun was further accused of the forcible transfer of about 20,000 civilians, primarily Fur people, from the Kodoom villages and surrounding areas. News reports also allege that Haroun and fellow Janjaweed militia leader Ali Kushayb forced the displacement of 34,000 civilians in March 2008 from their homes. Haroun was also accused of pressuring displaced persons to leave displacement camps, and in doing so placed women and children at risk of attacks and malnutrition.

== The ICC warrants and their aftermath ==
On 27 April 2007, the International Criminal Court issued an arrest warrant for Ahmad Muhammad Haroun, charging him with 20 counts of crimes against humanity and 22 counts of war crimes. He is accused of recruiting, funding and arming the Janjaweed militia. The Janjaweed attacked civilians and pillaged towns and villages during counterinsurgency attacks.

From April 2003 until September 2005, Haroun was Minister of State as well as head of the "Darfur Security Desk," and from 2006 to 2009, he served as the Minister of State for Humanitarian Affairs. Currently, he is the governor of South Kordofan, which borders South Sudan, where a brutal counterinsurgency campaign is raging, most severely in the Nuba mountains.

Despite international calls for his arrest, Haroun continued to serve as minister of state for humanitarian affairs (which is a post below the full ministerial level). In this role, Haroun oversaw Darfur's two million internally displaced persons. Aid agencies have accused him of hindering their efforts to bring relief to the displaced.

In September 2007, the Sudanese government announced that Haroun would lead an investigation into human rights abuses in Darfur. It also appointed Haroun to be a member of its committee overseeing the United Nations African Union Mission in Darfur (UNAMID), thus influencing the deployment of peacekeepers in Darfur.

As a result of the escalating crisis in the state of Abyei in the first week of 2011, the UN decided to fly Haroun to the province. He was seen as the only suitable mediator at the time. The ICC is not a part of the UN, but the UN promised to cooperate with the ICC, and the action chosen by the UN – although pragmatic – proved controversial.

== Governor of South and North Kordofan ==
In June 2011, Haroun defeated Abdelaziz al-Hilu of the SPLA to become the governor of South Kordofan in an election rejected by the SPLA as rigged.

On 12 July 2013 Haroun, along with the Governor of North Kordofan, resigned. In a presidential decree Omar al-Bashir reappointed Haroun as Governor of North Kordofan until 23 February 2019.

== 2019 arrest ==
In April 2019, Haroun was arrested by local authorities in Sudan following the 2019 Sudanese coup d'état, which overthrew Omar al-Bashir. On 5 May 2020, he tested positive for COVID-19 and was subsequently placed in quarantine.

He escaped from Kobar Prison during the chaos of the civil war, and voiced support for the Sudanese Armed Forces.

In January 2024, the United States offered a $5 million reward for information leading to the capture of Ahmed Haroun. Haroun is portrayed by the US State Department as having recruited, financed and armed the sinister Janjaweed militia who participated in atrocities including murder, rape, torture, forced deportations and other inhumane treatment in Darfur in the 2000s.

In November 2026, Haroun was detained by the Sudanese Armed Forces.

== See also ==
- Darfur conflict
- International criminal law
- Cases before the International Criminal Court#Darfur, Sudan
