= Ali Kushayb =

Sudanese militia commander (born 1949)

- Born: Ali Muhammad Ali Abd-Al-Rahman; 1949 (age 76–77); South Darfur, Anglo-Egyptian Sudan
- Convictions: 27 counts of crimes against humanity, and war crimes (2025)
- Penalty: 20 years imprisonment
- Military career
- Allegiance: Sudan
- Branch: Janjaweed; Popular Defence Forces (2003−2004)
- Commands: Central Reserve Forces (Abu Tira) in Rahad el-Berdi (2013)
- Conflicts: War in Darfur

Ali Muhammad Ali Abd-Al-Rahman (Arabic: علي محمد علي عبد الرحمن), commonly known as Ali Kushayb (Arabic: علي كوشيب) (also: Koship, Kosheib, Kouchib, Kosheb, Koshib), is a senior Janjaweed commander who supported the Sudanese government against Darfur rebel groups during the Omar al-Bashir presidency. He was indicted by the International Criminal Court (ICC) for war crimes. He was known as aqid al oqada ("colonel of colonels") and was active in Wadi Salih, West Darfur.

On 27 February 2007, Prosecutor Luis Moreno Ocampo charged Kushayb with crimes against civilians in Darfur during 2003 and 2004, accusing him of ordering killings, rapes, and looting. An ICC arrest warrant was issued for him and Ahmed Haroun, his co-defendant, on 27 April 2007. In April 2008, he was released from Sudanese custody. Sudanese authorities re-arrested Kushayb in October 2008. In early 2013, Kushayb was commander of the Central Reserve Forces (Abu Tira) in Rahad el-Berdi in South Darfur. Reports on his activities continued sporadically from 2013 to 2017. He was taken into custody by the International Criminal Court in June 2020, and in October 2025 was convicted on 27 counts of murder, crimes against humanity, and war crimes.

== Background ==
Ali Kushayb's father was a member of the Ta’isha tribe while his mother was from the Dangaoni tribe from the southern part of Sudan.

Ali Kushayb was an aqid al-ogada, a colonel of colonels, for the Wadi Salih area in Darfur. He was one of the senior leaders of the tribal hierarchy in the Wadi Salih locality, and was a member of the Popular Defence Forces (PDF), as well as a commander of a government backed militia in Darfur from August 2003 until March 2004. He served as a liaison between the government and the Janjaweed, while simultaneously participating in attacks against targeted groups.

== Criminal activity in Darfur ==
The ICC charged Kushayb with 504 counts of murder, 20 rapes, and the forced displacement of 41,000 people. In one of the various attacks by Ali Kushayb and the militia under his command, a survivor reported that 150 people were murdered, in which 30 children were killed, all in 90 minutes. Similarly, a woman who survived the pillaging of her village, Galania, and arrived to a refugee camp in Chad, related how one day the Janjaweed militia arrived at her town to kill civilians. Her husband was the first to be killed, and while she tried to run away she was caught by militia soldiers, and, at the command of Kushayb, was forced at knifepoint to confess she was "tora-bora," or a rebel. After she arrived in Chad, other victims told similar stories of the horrors they underwent by the militia under the command of Kushayb: sixteen women were raped and murdered, from which six were elderly women, children were thrown into a fire, houses were burned, countless were tortured and wounded, a dozen others were killed.

Kushayb has been accused of personally participating in attacks against civilians in the towns of Kodoom, Bindisi, Mukjar and Arawala and surrounding areas between August 2003 and March 2004. Kushayb was reported to be working for Ahmed Haroun. Eyewitnesses have reported meetings between Kushayb and Haroun. In one instance in August 2003, for example, Kushayb and Haroun supposedly met in the town of Mukluk, where Haroun provided money and arms to Kushayb for the militia. After their meeting Kushayb led the militia in an attack on the town of Bindisi. The attack lasted five days, during which more than 100 people were killed including 30 children.

In December 2003 in the town of Arawala, a witness reported Kushayb inspecting her and other women who had been tied to a tree naked to be raped repeatedly by Janjaweed militia soldiers. According to the ICC, Kushayb directly participated in the murder of 32 men in the town of Mukjar. Fifteen minutes after Kushayb and his soldiers took the men from the village, gunshots were heard and 32 dead bodies were found the next day. In another attack led by Kushayb near Mukjar, a man was arrested and told what he witnessed:

"[The] men were restrained in different ways. Some of them … had been tied and suspended in the air… His arms were held wide apart and tied to a plank of wood on the ceiling, while his legs were also held wide apart and tied to objects on either side … a stove was left burning between his legs…. All the men had whip marks on their bodies and their clothes were torn and blood-stained… He had been repeatedly beaten, called "Tora Bora" and deprived of food…. Two other men … had been badly beaten and their fingernails and toenails had been forcibly removed."

== Other activity ==
In April 2013, Kushayb, as commander of the Central Reserve Forces (Abu Tira) in Rahad el-Berdi in South Darfur, carried out a military attack with support from military intelligence forces after a peace treaty between the Salamat and al-Taaysha tribes had been signed. On 7 July 2013, Kushayb, his bodyguards, and a tea-seller standing nearby were injured by a gunman in Nyala. Kushayb was bleeding from his shoulders and admitted to the Nyala Police Hospital with two bullet wounds in his shoulder. One of the bodyguards died. Kushayb was transferred to a hospital in Khartoum. In December 2017, Kushayb was accused by leaders of the Salamat tribe of trying to kill Ali Osman Obeid, a cattle merchant, in Rahad el-Berdi. As of June 2019, Kushayb remained a fugitive.

== International Criminal Court case ==
On 27 February 2007, Prosecutor Luis Moreno Ocampo charged Kushayb with crimes against civilians in Darfur during 2003 and 2004, accusing him of ordering killings, rapes, and looting. An ICC arrest warrant was issued for him and Ahmed Haroun, his co-defendant, on 27 April 2007. In April 2008, he was released from Sudanese custody. In October 2008, the Sudanese authorities re-arrested Kushayb.

According to local media, Kushayb had moved from Sudan to the Central African Republic in February 2020, being worried about arrest by Sudanese authorities during the 2019 Sudanese transition to democracy. Kushayb surrendered himself for arrest in June 2020, appearing before the International Criminal Court on 15 June 2020.

In July 2021, the judges of the International Criminal Court (ICC) confirmed the indictment of Ali Kushayb, the first stemming from a UN Security Council referral. His trial started in April 2022. The defense argued that Abd-al-Rahman was a separate person from Kushayb, that the Sudanese government never provided the defense with civil status documents, military and criminal records, and that the defendant made a mistake in claiming to be Kushayb.

On 12 December 2024, during closing arguments, the prosecutor of the ICC asked the judges to find Kushayb guilty on 31 counts, while the defense argued for acquittal on all counts. The trial concluded on 13 December.

On 6 October 2025, the court found Kushayb guilty on 27 counts of murder, crimes against humanity, and war crimes. The case marked the first occasion that gender-based persecution was successfully prosecuted as a crime against humanity. On 9 December 2025, he was sentenced to 20 years' imprisonment. On January 8 and 9, 2026, the defense and prosecution, respectively, filed appeals against the sentence.

== See also ==
- International Criminal Court investigation in Darfur
