= Justice and Equality Movement =

Sudanese opposition group

- حركة العدل والمساواة
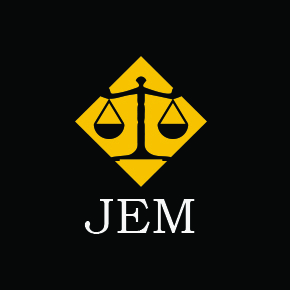
- Leaders: Khalil Ibrahim † (2000–2011); Gibril Ibrahim (2012–present)
- Dates active: 2000–present
- Active regions: Darfur & Kordofan, Sudan; Libya
- Ideology: Islamic democracy Populism; Federalism
- Size: 35,000 (claim)
- Part of: Sudan Revolutionary Front
- Wars: the War in Darfur, the conflict in South Kordofan and Blue Nile and the Second Libyan Civil War

The Justice and Equality Movement (JEM; Arabic: حركة العدل والمساواة, Ḥarakat al-ʿAdl wal-musāwāh) is an opposition group in Sudan founded by Khalil Ibrahim. Gibril Ibrahim has led the group since January 2012 after the death of Khalil, his brother, in December 2011. The JEM supported the removal of President of Sudan, Omar al-Bashir and nation-wide government reform.

== Formation and organization ==
The Justice and Equality Movement trace their origin to the writers of The Black Book: Imbalance of Power and Wealth in the Sudan, a manuscript published in 2000 that details what it views as the structural inequality in the country; the JEM's founder, Khalil Ibrahim, was one of the authors.

The JEM claims to number around 35,000 with an ethnically diverse membership. According to critics it is not the "rainbow of tribes" it claims to be, as most JEM members, including its leader, are from the Zaghawa tribe. The JEM is part of the Sudan Revolutionary Front (SRF), an alliance of groups opposed to the Government of Sudan.

== History of attacks ==
=== Raids on Haskanita ===
In the September and October 2007 raids on Haskanita JEM units attacked the African Union Mission in Sudan. Three JEM leaders, Bahr Idriss Abu Garda, Abdallah Banda Abakaer Nourain and Saleh Mohammed Jerbo Jamus, were charged by the International Criminal Court (ICC) of war crimes. The case against Garda was dropped due to lack of evidence and the case against Jerbo was dropped after his presumed death on 19 April 2013. As of June 2019, Banda was considered a fugitive by the ICC.

=== Oilfield attacks and anti-government operations ===
In October 2007, the JEM attacked the Defra oilfield in the Kordofan region of Sudan. The Greater Nile Petroleum Operating Company, a Chinese-led consortium, controls the field. The next month, a group of 135 Chinese engineers arrived in Darfur to work on the Defra field. Ibrahim told reporters, "We oppose them coming because the Chinese are not interested in human rights. [They are] just interested in Sudan's resources." The JEM claims that the revenue from oil sold to China funds the Sudanese government and the Janjaweed militia.

On the morning of December 11, 2007, Khalil Ibrahim claimed that JEM forces fought and defeated Sudanese government troops guarding a Chinese-run oilfield in the Kordofan region. Khartoum officials, however, denied that any oil fields had come under attack. Ibrahim said that the attack was part of a JEM campaign to rid Sudan of Chinese-run oilfields and stated that "[The JEM] want all Chinese companies to leave. They have been warned many times. They should not be there."

=== 2008–2013 Khartoum attack and continued battles ===
In May 2008, JEM engaged in its most famous operation against the Sudanese government when it attacked the Sudanese capital of Khartoum. JEM's advance recorded many impressive gains which included temporarily controlling the city of Omdurman, the airport at the Wadi Sayedna military base, 10 miles (16 km) north of Khartoum, and three bridges leading into the capital. The operation ended with heavy battles in the western part of the Sudanese capital that included the government's use of army helicopters to repel the JEM advance. Following this battle, Eltahir Elfaki, the General Secretary of JEM's legislative council, vowed that the war would henceforth be fought across the country, saying that "We haven't changed our tactics. From the beginning, Jem is a national movement and it has a national agenda." Khalil Ibrahim declared that "This is just the start of a process and the end is the termination of this regime".

In April 2013, JEM and its allies in the Sudan Revolutionary Front engaged in many successful attacks against Sudanese government forces. In a raid coordinated between all the parties of the SRF that included the use of 20 vehicles, the opposition forces briefly held the strategic city of Um Rawaba in North Kordofan, located 300 miles (480 km) south of Khartoum. As part of the offensive, JEM and the SRF also gained control of Abu Korshola, a strategic town of 40,000 in South Kordofan. In its bid to retake control, the Sudanese Armed Forces engaged in indiscriminate air raid campaigns. On May 27, the opposition forces withdrew in order to allow humanitarian aid to be delivered to the area's residents. During 2013, opposition forces continued to engage in offensive operations, leading to dozens of casualties for Sudanese forces around Abu Korshola.

== August 2020 peace agreement ==
The Justice and Equality Movement signed a peace agreement with the Transitional Government of Sudan on 31 August 2020 and will now participate in the transition to democracy in Sudan through peaceful means. Under the terms of the agreement, the factions that signed will be entitled to three seats on the sovereignty council, a total of five ministers in the transitional cabinet and a quarter of seats in the transitional legislature. At a regional level, signatories will be entitled between 30 and 40% of the seats on transitional legislatures of their home states or regions.

== Splinter Groups ==
- National Movement for Reform and Development Split in April 2004, led by Jibril Abdul Karim a former member of Idriss Debys presidential guard.
- The Field Revolutionary Command Split from JEM in early 2005 and led by Mohamed Saleh. Merged with National Movement for Reform and Development in late 2005.
- JEM Peace Wing Split after the Abuja Peace Agreement.
- National Redemption Front led by Khalil Ibrahim together with SLM commanders. Had a military alliance with SLM-Unity.
