= Raids on Haskanita =

Raids during the Darfur conflict

The raids on Haskanita were a series of attacks on African Union peacekeepers by rebel groups during the Darfur conflict. The attacks took place on 30 September and early October 2007 near the town of Haskanita in South Darfur. Three rebel commanders were arrested for the attacks on warrants issued by the International Criminal Court.

== Background ==
The Darfur conflict started in 2003 when two rebels groups took up arms against the Sudanese government. The Justice and Equality Movement (JEM) and Sudan Liberation Army (SLA) claimed that the government discriminated against black Africans in favor of Arabs. Local Arab Janjaweed militias intervened on the side of the government. Following an initial ceasefire in 2004, African Union peacekeepers were deployed as the African Union Mission in Sudan. (AMIS) AMIS established a base in Haskanita, in Um Kadada District, North Darfur province and 100 km northeast of Ed Daein.

In November 2006 the area around Haskanita was taken over from the SLA by the National Redemption Front - a splinter group from the JEM. Aid agencies suspended their operations in the neighbouring districts of Ed Daein and Adila.

== First raid ==
On 30 September 2007 approximately 1,000 rebels attacked an AMIS base, killing 10 peacekeepers, including seven from Nigeria and one each from Mali, Senegal and Botswana, and wounded many more. A further 50 personnel were initially unaccounted for, but later found. The attack occurred just after sunset, and came amid increasing tensions and violence between the separatist rebels and AMIS peacekeepers, who the rebels accused of bias towards the central government. Survivors said the rebels used heavy weaponry to attack the AMIS base, including rocket-propelled grenades and armored vehicles. Sudan's army and Darfur rebel movements initially blamed each other for the attack.

== Second raid ==
The town of Haskanita was attacked again in early October, and most of it was set on fire. Following the attack, the town's mosque and school were some of the few buildings remaining intact. The ruins still act as a base for African Union forces, headquartering a full 800-strong battalion. Although it has yet to be confirmed, unnamed sources in Khartoum claimed the fires were set by AU forces and Janjaweed militia in retaliation for the attacks in late September.

== International Criminal Court investigation ==
The Darfur conflict had been referred by the UN Security Council in 2005 to the International Criminal Court and the Chief Prosecutor had opened an investigation into crimes related to the conflict.

In July 2008, the Chief Prosecutor said he knew who were the perpetrators of the Haskanita raids, and he was committed to prosecuting them. In November 2008, he requested arrest warrants for three rebel commanders from the Justice and Equality Movement for these attacks. One of these — Bahr Idriss Abu Garda — voluntarily surrendered to the court in May 2009. However, charges were dropped in February 2010 when judges ruled the prosecutor could not prove he had planned the attack. The other two commanders - Abdallah Banda Abakaer Nourain and Saleh Mohammed Jerbo Jamus - surrendered to the court in June 2010 and were charged with three counts of war crimes:

- murder
- pillage
- Attacking peacekeepers

Banda led a splinter group from the Justice and Equality Movement and Jerbo led the Sudanese Liberation Army - Unity faction. Abu Garda led the United Resistance Front, another splinter group from the JEM.
