= Abdel Rahim Mohammed Hussein =

Sudanese politician (born 1949)

- عبد الرحيم محمد حسين
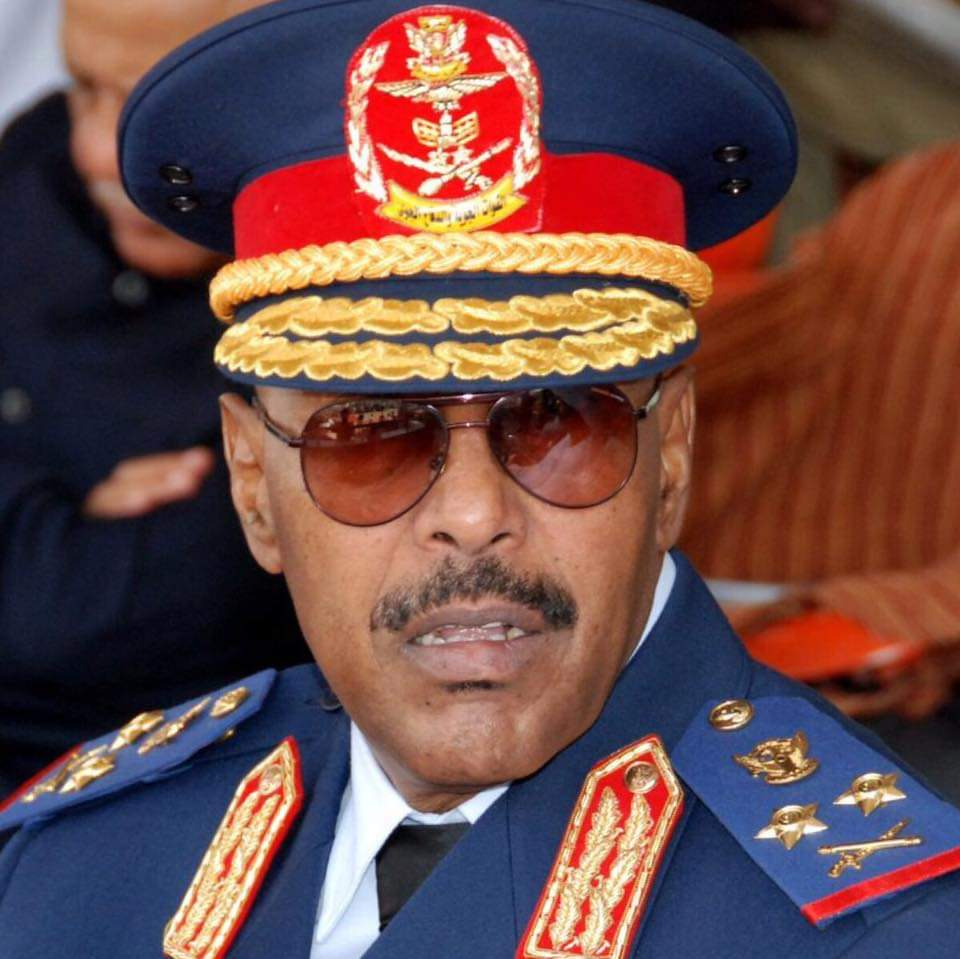
- Abdel Rahim Hussein in July 2011.

Governor of Khartoum State
- In office 6 June 2015 – 11 April 2019
- President: Omar al-Bashir

Minister of National Defense
- In office 22 September 2005 – 6 June 2015
- President: Omar al-Bashir
- Preceded by: Bakri Hassan Saleh
- Succeeded by: Mustafa Osman Obeid Salim

Minister of Interior Affairs
- In office 18 January 1993 – 13 July 2005
- President: Omar al-Bashir
- Succeeded by: Ibrahim Mahmoud Hamad

Secretary-General of the Revolutionary Command Council for National Salvation
- In office 30 June 1989 – 16 October 1993
- President: Omar al-Bashir
- Preceded by: Post established
- Succeeded by: Post abolished

Personal details
- Born: 1949 (age 76–77) Dongola, Northern State, Sudan
- Party: National Congress Party

Military service
- Allegiance: Sudan
- Branch/service: Sudanese Air Force
- Years of service: 1960's – 1989
- Rank: General

Abdel Rahim Mohammed Hussein (Arabic: عبد الرحيم محمد حسين; born 1949) is a Sudanese politician and the former Governor of Khartoum State. Hussein served as the longstanding Minister of National Defense of the Republic of Sudan. Hussein also served for a period as the Minister of Interior Affairs. During his term as Minister of Interior Affairs, he opened the Rabat University. Hussein was arrested in early April 2019 following a coup on 11 April which overthrew longtime president Omar al-Bashir.

== Early life ==
Hussein was born in 1949 Kerma, part of Northern State. In 1964 he began his secondary education in Khartoum. It was here that he became an Islamist and also where he met and became close friends with Omar al-Bashir.

== Military career ==
He joined the Sudanese Air Force in the 1960s, and became a leading member of the Muslim Brotherhoods military cell from the 1970s onwards. Hussein graduated from the prestigious Cranfield University in the United Kingdom with a master's degree in aeronautical engineering in 1982. He played a major role in the 1989 Sudanese coup d'état, and afterwards in 1990 became Secretary-General of the Revolutionary Command Council for National Salvation; the ruling authority of Sudan between 1989 and 1993.

== Politics ==
=== Interior Minister ===
Following the dissolution of the Revolutionary Command Council for National Salvation he was appointed Minister of Interior Affairs by President Bashir, a position through which he dominated Sudan's internal security services. Whilst Interior Minister he was alleged to have worked directly with al-Qaeda during Osama bin Ladens time in Sudan from 1992 to 1996, and was alleged to have even provided al-Qaeda with sophisticated communications equipment.

Despite being a strong Islamist, Hussein remained a loyal Bashir supporter following Bashir's rift with Hassan al-Turabi; the leader of the National Islamic Front, and quite possibly the most influential Sudanese Islamist, who had supported Bashir in his 1989 coup attempt.

Hussein has recognised the major role Turabi played in the formation of the ideology that led the 1989 coup attempt, and spoke in 2002 about how although disliked the rift with Turabi due to the intellectual and political debt they owed him, Turabi's imprisonment was in fact necessary to protect the state that Turabi had advocated for.

In 2004 President Bashir appointed Hussein as his special representative for Darfur. He held this position until 2005. He lost his job as Interior Minister in 2005 after the National Assembly demanded his resignation following a scandal caused by the collapse of a police hospital he owned.

=== Minister of Defence ===
He became the Minister of National Defense in 2005, although has faced problems in this position, such as in May 2008 when he faced calls for his resignation due to security failures resulting in the 2008 attack on Omdurman and Khartoum.

He has also faced problems as Defence Minister from senior army officers demanding greater independence for the Sudanese Armed Forces from the National Congress Party. He has also been unsympathetic to rapprochement with the West, and even consoled the family of one of the killers of the US Diplomat John Granville following the death of the young militant in Somalia.

In a cabinet reshuffle after the 2015 Sudanese general election Hussein lost his position as Minister of Defence on 6 June 2015. He was succeeded by Mustafa Osman Obeid Salim. It became the first time since 1989 that Hussein was not part of the government.

== Governor of Khartoum State ==
Immediately after losing his position as Minister of Defence Hussein was named governor of Khartoum State. Within several days of his appointment he sacked the director general of the Khartoum State Water Corporation after protests occurred in response to water cuts. In 2017 he ordered the deportation of illegal foreigners in Khartoum, citing security concerns.

== 2019 arrest ==
On 11 April 2019, al-Bashir was overthrown in a coup and Hussein was soon afterwards arrested. On 27 May 2020, Sudan’s public prosecution service announced that Hussein had tested positive for COVID-19 and was subsequently placed in quarantine.

On 15 April 2023, Hussein together with al-Bashir and at least three other allies, were moved from Kobar Prison to a military hospital. On 26 April, he and his allies were reported to have escaped from prison amid the breakout of the civil war.

== War crimes allegations ==
On 2 December 2011, the Prosecutor of the International Criminal Court of the investigating the situation in Darfur, Luis Moreno Ocampo, requested a Pre-Trial Chamber of the Court to issue an arrest warrant against Abdel Rahim Mohammed Hussein for war crimes and crimes against humanity.

On 1 March 2012, the ICC issued an arrest warrant for Hussein, charging with 20 counts of crimes against humanity and 21 counts of war crimes. As one of Bashir's closest allies, Hussein is accused of recruiting, arming and funding police forces and the Janjaweed militia in Darfur and also reported to be leading a campaign against rebels in the south.

In 2013 Human Rights Watch called upon Chad to arrest Hussein who was in the country for a conference.
