= Arawala =

Arawala أروالا
- Location of Arawala
- Coordinates: 12°22′57″N 23°17′41″E
- Country: Sudan
- State: West Darfur
- Time zone: UTC+2 (CAT)

Arawala (Arabic: أروالا) was a village in West Darfur, Sudan. It used to have a population of 7000 inhabitants; however, this changed after the village was attacked by Janjaweed militia.
