= Bahr Idriss Abu Garda =

Sudanese rebel leader (born 1963)

Bahr Idriss Abu Gard

Minister of Health
- In office 2011–2019
- Preceded by: Shakir al-Siraj
- Succeeded by: Akram Al-Toumi

Personal details
- Born: 1 January 1963 (age 63) Nana, North Darfur, Sudan
- Education: Economy

Bahr Idriss Abu Garda (born 1 January 1963) is the leader of the United Resistance Front, a rebel group fighting against the Sudanese government in Darfur. He is a former commander of the Justice and Equality Movement.

Abu Garda was summonsed to appear before the International Criminal Court for alleged war crimes relating to a 2007 attack in which twelve African Union peacekeepers were killed. He is the first person to appear voluntarily before the ICC, and the first person to appear before the court in connection with the war in Darfur. He denied the allegations against him: "I am looking forward to clear my name from this case because I am sure ... that absolutely I am not guilty". The hearing to confirm the charges against him was held from 19 to 29 October 2009, ending in a decision by the judges not to confirm the charges and a rejection 23 April 2010 of an appeal by the Prosecutor.

== Childhood ==
Abu Garda was born in Nana, North Darfur, Sudan, and is a member of the Zaghawa tribe.

== Career in armed groups ==
From January 2005 to September 2007, he was vice-president of the Justice and Equality Movement (JEM), an armed Islamist group which fought against the Sudanese government and pro-government militia groups in Darfur. He split with the JEM and on 4 October 2007 he participated in the formation of a new armed group called the JEM Collective Leadership.

As of May 2009, he is the leader of the United Resistance Front, another rebel group.

== International Criminal Court prosecution ==
On 20 November 2008, the prosecutor of the International Criminal Court, Luis Moreno-Ocampo, presented evidence alleging that Abu Garda and two other rebel commanders were guilty of war crimes in relation to a 2007 operation in which about a thousand rebels surrounded and attacked a camp of African Union peacekeepers in Haskanita, Darfur, killing twelve.

On 7 May 2009, a Pre-Trial Chamber found that there were grounds to believe that Abu Garda was responsible on three counts of war crimes: murder, pillaging, and intentionally directing attacks against personnel, installations, material, units or vehicles involved in a peacekeeping mission. The prosecutor submitted that an arrest warrant was unnecessary since Abu Garda had expressed his willingness to appear before the court, so the court issued a summons ordering him to appear before the court on 18 May 2009. Abu Garda flew to The Hague by commercial airliner on 17 May and became the first person to appear voluntarily before the ICC.

Abu Garda denied all the charges against him and claimed to be the victim of a dispute between the URF and the JEM, which has said it helped to collect evidence against him. He said "I am looking forward to clear my name from this case because I am sure ... that absolutely I am not guilty".

After his initial appearance before the court on 18 May 2009, he left the Netherlands to return to his soldiers. The hearing to confirm the charges against him took place from 19 to 29 October 2009, and ended on 8 February and 23 April 2010 with the charges being dropped and the Prosecutor's appeal against this being rejected.
