= Saleh Jerbo =

Sudanese rebel leader

Saleh Mohammed Jerbo Jamus, commonly referred to as Saleh Jerbo (1 January 1977 – 19 April 2013), was the Chief-of-Staff of the SLA-Unity. He was indicted by the International Criminal Court to be tried, together with Abdallah Banda, for three counts of war crimes allegedly committed during the Raids on Haskanita against African Union peacekeepers within the context of the Darfur conflict in Sudan. The case against him was dropped without prejudice after his apparent death on 19 April 2013.

== Birth and ethnicity ==
According to information from the International Criminal Court, Saleh Jerbo was born on 1 January 1977 in Shagag Karo, North Darfur. He was a member of the Zaghawa tribe.

== Haskanita raids ==
On the evening of 29 September 2007, groups led by Banda and Jerbo are alleged to have attacked African Union Mission in Sudan (AMIS) soldiers at the Haskanita Military Group Site in Umm Kadada in North Darfur. A total of 12 AMIS peace keepers were killed.

== ICC proceedings ==
After the Darfur situation was referred to the ICC by the United Nations Security Council through its Resolution 1593 on 31 March 2005 the Darfur conflict has been under the jurisdiction of the ICC. The Prosecutor of the Court opened an investigation on 6 June 2005.

On 27 August 2009, summonses to appear were issued against Banda and Jerbo under seal. They were unsealed on 15 June 2010, immediately before the two suspects' voluntary initial appearance before the Court. They were charged with three counts of war crimes: violence to life, pillaging and attacking peacekeepers.

After the confirmation of charges hearing on 8 December 2010, the charges were confirmed and the suspects committed to trial on 7 March 2011.

== Report of death ==
On 22 April 2013, Radio Dabanga reported that Jerbo was killed in a battle on 19 April. The battle involved fighting between the Justice and Equality Movement (JEM) and the Justice and Equality Movement–Bashar (JEM–Bashar), the splinter group in which Jerbo held the position of deputy general commander. A spokesperson from JEM–Bashar confirmed the death, but one from JEM declined to do so. The ICC dropped the charges against him as a result of his apparent death, without prejudice, so that the case against him would reopen if he were found to still be alive.
