= Abdallah Banda =

Sudanese rebel leader

Abdallah Banda Abakaer Nourain (Arabic: عبد الله باندا أباكر نورين; born c. 1963), commonly referred to as Abdallah Banda (عبد الله باندا), is a Sudanese militant who was the Commander-in-Chief of the Justice and Equality Movement (JEM) Collective-Leadership, one of the components of the United Resistance Front. He was wanted for trial before the International Criminal Court for three counts of war crimes allegedly committed during the Haskanita raids against African Union peacekeepers within the context of the Darfur conflict in Sudan. The war crimes charges were dropped in July 2026 due to insufficient evidence.

== Birth and ethnicity ==
According to information from the International Criminal Court, Abdallah Banda was born in or around 1963 in Wai, Dar Kobe, North Darfur. He is a member of the Zaghawa tribe.

== Haskanita raids ==
On the evening of 29 September 2007, groups led by Banda and Jerbo are alleged to have attacked African Union Mission in Sudan (AMIS) soldiers at the Haskanita Military Group Site in Umm Kadada in North Darfur. A total of 12 AMIS peace keepers were killed.

== ICC proceedings ==
After the Darfur situation was referred to the ICC by the United Nations Security Council through its Resolution 1593 on 31 March 2005 the Darfur conflict has been under the jurisdiction of the ICC. The Prosecutor of the Court opened an investigation on 6 June 2005.

On 27 August 2009, summons to appear were issued against Banda and Jerbo under seal. They were unsealed on 15 June 2010, immediately before the two suspects' voluntary initial appearance before the Court. They were charged with three counts of war crimes: violence to life, pillaging and attacking peacekeepers.

After the confirmation of charges hearing on 8 December 2010, the charges were confirmed and the suspects committed to trial on 7 March 2011.

The ICC issued an arrest warrant in September 2014. His trial was indefinitely postponed while waiting for his arrest. As of June 2019, Banda remained at large.

In July 2026, the ICC dropped its war crimes proceedings against Banda after prosecutors determined that "[t]here are no longer substantial grounds to believe that Mr Banda is responsible for the charged crimes" and withdrew the charges.
