= United Nations Security Council Resolution 1593 =

UN Security Council Resolution 1593
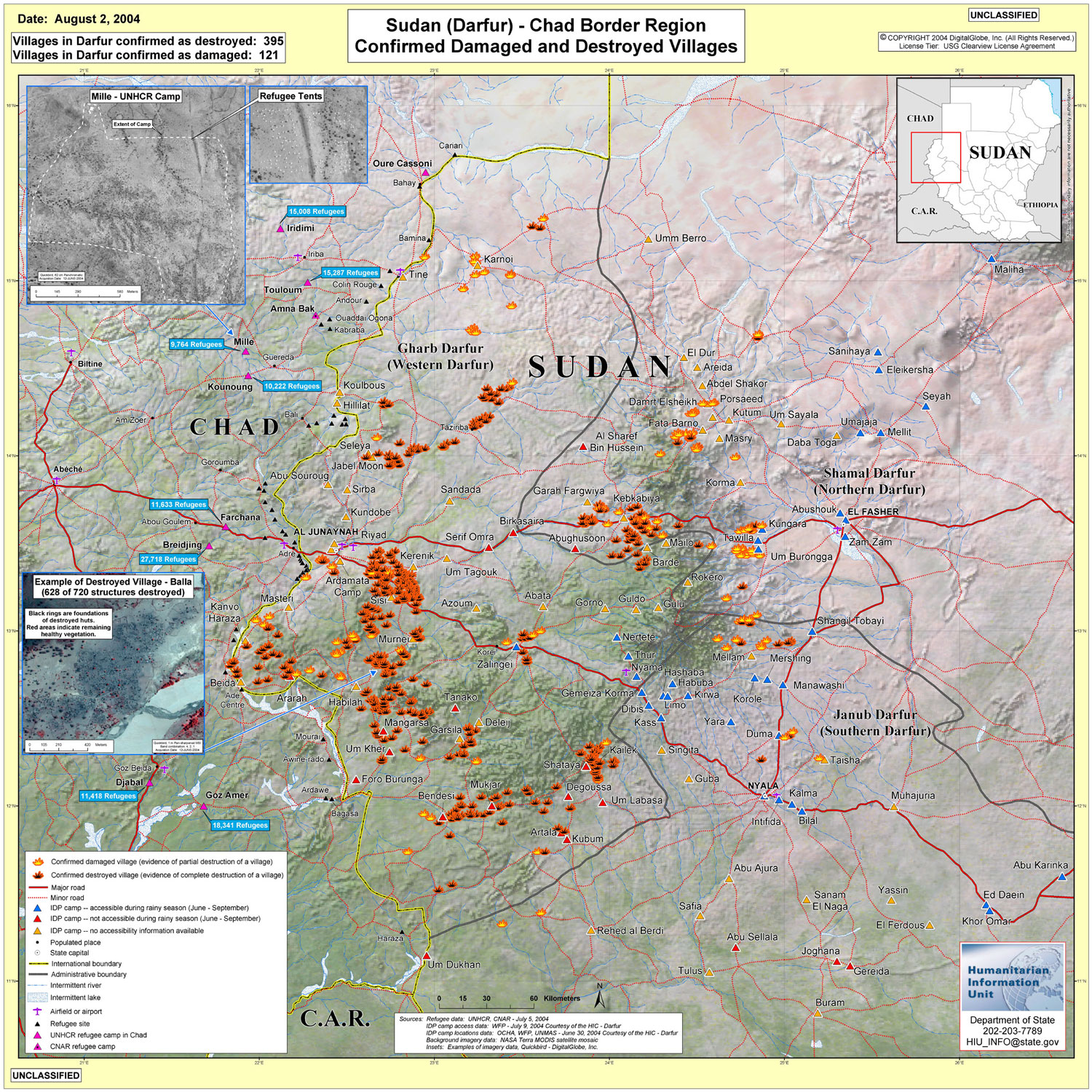
- Map of Darfurian villages destroyed in the Darfur conflict (2004)
- Date: 31 March 2005
- Meeting no.: 5,158
- Code: S/RES/1593 (Document)
- Subject: The situation concerning Sudan
- Voting summary: 11 voted for; None voted against; 4 abstained
- Result: Adopted

Security Council composition
- Permanent members: China; France; Russia; United Kingdom; United States
- Non-permanent members: Algeria; Argentina; Benin; Brazil; Denmark; Greece; Japan; Philippines; Romania; Tanzania

United Nations Security Council Resolution 1593, adopted on 31 March 2005, after receiving a report by the International Commission of Inquiry on Darfur, the Council referred the situation in the Darfur region of Sudan to the International Criminal Court (ICC) and required Sudan to co-operate fully. It marked the first time the council had referred a situation to the court, and also compelled a country to co-operate with it.

Sudan, which is not a permanent member of the ICC under the Rome Statute, refuses to recognise the court's jurisdiction, stated that "the International Criminal Court has no place in this crisis at all."

== Adoption ==
The resolution was adopted by 11 votes to none against and four abstentions from Algeria, Brazil, China and the United States. The Algerian representative preferred an African Union-devised solution to the problem, Brazil agreed with the resolution but objected to the U.S. view on selective jurisdiction of the court, the Chinese representative disagreed with some elements of the ICC Statute and argued for the perpetrators to be tried in Sudanese courts, and the United States objected to some provisions of the court but overall supported humanitarian interests and the fight against impunity.

== Resolution ==
Acting under Chapter VII of the United Nations Charter, the council referred the situation since 1 July 2002 to the ICC and urged all states to co-operate with the Court, whether or not it was party to the Rome Statute. The ICC and African Union were invited to discuss the practicalities of proceedings relating to the conflict, while the ICC was encouraged to promote the rule of law, human rights and combat impunity in Darfur.

The resolution also emphasised the importance of reconciliation, through the creation of truth commissions for example. Nationals from a state other than Sudan which did not recognise the jurisdiction of the Court would instead be subject to the jurisdiction of that state for acts related to Sudan.

== See also ==
- African Union Mission in Sudan
- African Union – United Nations Hybrid Operation in Darfur
- International response to the War in Darfur
- List of United Nations Security Council Resolutions 1501 to 1600 (2003–2005)
- Timeline of the War in Darfur
- United Nations Mission in Sudan
- War in Darfur
