= Janjaweed =

Arab militia of western Sudan and eastern Chad

Janjaweed جنجويد
- Leaders: Multiple leaders, including Musa Hilal, Ali Kushayb and Hemedti
- Dates active: 1987–present
- Active regions: Sudan; Chad; Yemen; Libya
- Ideology: Tribalism
- Status: Active
- Part of: Sudanese Armed Forces; Rapid Support Forces (majority, since 2013)

The Janjaweed (Arabic: جنجويد, romanized: Janjawīd) are a Sudanese Arab Baggara nomad militia group operating in the Sahel region, specifically in Sudan, particularly in Darfur and eastern Chad. They have also been speculated to be active in Yemen. According to the United Nations definition, Janjaweed membership consists of Arab nomad tribes from the Sahel, the core of whom are Abbala Arabs, traditionally employed in camel herding, with significant recruitment from the Baggara.

Janjaweed nomads were initially at odds with Darfur's sedentary population due to competition over grazing grounds and farmland, a conflict exacerbated by drought. The Janjaweed were a major player in the Darfur conflict between 2003 and 2020, in opposition to the Sudan Liberation Movement/Army and the Justice and Equality Movement rebels. In 2013, the Rapid Support Forces grew out of the Janjaweed.

== Etymology ==
The origin of the word Janjaweed is unclear. It may derive from the Arabic words jinn (Arabic: جِنّ, lit. 'hidden, i.e. genie, demon or insane') and ʾajāwīd (Arabic: أَجاويد, lit. 'horses, horsemen'), and thus has been translated into English by some sources as "devils on horseback". Other sources suggest it may derive from the Persian word jangjavi (Persian: جنگجوی, lit. 'warriors'), or a portmanteau of three words: جَن (jan) from English "gun"; jinn; and ʾajāwīd. The word "Janjaweed" was used by François Tombalbaye, the Christian President of Chad, to marginalize his Muslim political opponents.

== History ==
In Darfur, a western state in Sudan, Libyan leader Muammar Gaddafi supported the creation of the Tajammu al-Arabi (Arab Gathering) militia, which was described by Gérard Prunier as "a militantly racist and pan-Arabist organization which stressed the 'Arab' character of the province". The Arab Gathering shared members and a source of support with the Islamic Legion, and the distinction between the two is often ambiguous.

The nearly continuous cross-border raids contributed to a separate ethnic conflict within Darfur that killed about 9,000 people between 1985 and 1988. The Janjaweed leadership has some background in Gaddafi's mercenary forces.

The Janjaweed first appeared in 1988 after Chadian president Hissène Habré, backed by France and the United States, defeated the Libyan army. Gaddafi's Chadian protégé, Acheikh Ibn-Oumar, retreated with his partisan forces to Darfur, where they were hosted by Sheikh Musa Hilal, the newly elevated chief of the Rizeigat Arab tribes of north Darfur. Hilal's tribesmen had earlier smuggled Libyan weapons to Ibn-Oumar's forces. A French-Chadian incursion destroyed Ibn-Oumar's camp, but his weapons remained with his Mahamid hosts.

Throughout the 1990s, the Janjaweed were Arab partisans who pursued a local agenda of controlling land, and were tolerated by the Sudan Government. The majority of Darfur's Arabs, the Baggara, became involved in the war over grazing territory. In 1999–2000, faced with threats of insurgency in Western and Northern Darfur, Khartoum's security armed the Janjaweed forces.

As the insurgency escalated in February 2003, spearheaded by the Sudan Liberation Movement/Army and the Justice and Equality Movement, the Sudanese government responded by using the Janjaweed as its main counter-insurgency force. Janjaweed forces were ordered to attack and recover the rebel-held areas of Darfur, conducting a campaign against rebels in Darfur. In 2004, the U.S. State Department and others named leading Janjaweed commanders, including Musa Hilal, as genocide suspects. By early 2006, many Janjaweed had been absorbed into the Sudan Armed Forces including the Popular Defense Forces and Border Guards. Meanwhile, the Janjaweed expanded to include some Arab tribes in eastern Darfur who were not historically associated with the original Janjaweed. A political base was also reestablished in Chad as part of the United Front for Democratic Change (FUC) coalition.

By October 2007, only the United States government had declared the Janjaweed killings in Darfur to be genocide, since they had killed an estimated 200,000–400,000 civilians over the previous three years. The UN Security Council called for the Janjaweed to be disarmed, a call separately echoed by Secretary General Ban Ki-Moon in the same year. On 14 July 2008, the prosecutor of the International Criminal Court filed genocide charges against Sudanese president Omar al-Bashir, accusing him of masterminding attempts to wipe out African tribes in Darfur with a campaign of murder, rape and deportation.

In 2013, the Rapid Support Forces (RSF) were formed from the Janjaweed to fight against rebel groups in Darfur, South Kordofan, and Blue Nile.

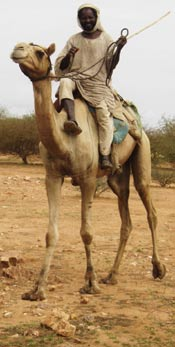
Janjaweed in marketplaces and within walking distance of refugee camps.

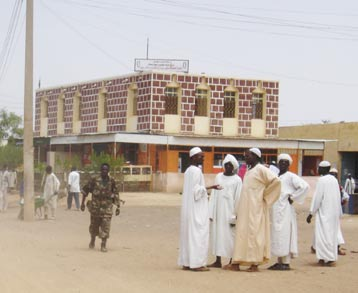
Armed Janjaweed walk through the marketplace in Geneina

=== Civil war ===
In 2023, international diplomats insisted that the RSF merge into the Sudanese Army as part of the Sudanese transition to democracy. By April 2023, power struggles developed between Sudan's de facto national leader, army commander Abdel Fattah al-Burhan, and the leader of the RSF, Hemedti. On 15 April 2023, clashes between RSF and army forces erupted across the country.

By the second day of the conflict, 78 people had been reported killed. Among the dead were three World Food Programme (WFP) workers, triggering the organization to suspend its work in Sudan, where it had been a principal force in alleviating hunger. United Nations Secretary-General António Guterres demanded immediate justice for the killings and called for an end to the conflict.

Diplomats from the African Union and Saudi Arabia mediated a three-hour humanitarian ceasefire on that same day to permit the evacuation of the injured. Despite this, the battles continued, as both sides claimed to have seized control of key sites in and around the capital city.As the civil war drags on, the Janjaweed still supports the Rapid Support Forces in their efforts to overthrow Al-Burhan’s government, and continues the alleged genocide in Darfur. A notable incident occurred during the siege of El-Fashir, when the Janjaweed and RSF killed over 14,000 civilians, with 1,500 more being killed after the RSF captured the city in late 2025.
