= Encyclopedia of Genocide and Crimes Against Humanity =

2005 encyclopedia

- Editor: Dinah Shelton
- Publisher: Macmillan Reference
- Publication date: 2005

Encyclopedia of Genocide and Crimes Against Humanity is a three-volume reference work about genocide and other atrocities throughout world history. Edited by Dinah Shelton, it was published in 2005 by Macmillan Reference.

== Contents ==
Published in 2005 by Macmillan Reference and aimed at those with a high school or college level education, the Encyclopedia of Genocide and Crimes against Humanity was comprises three illustrated volumes spanning approximately 1500 pages and with 354 entries, each between 500 and 5000 words long. The main body of the work is organized by alphabetically by topic. It covers various genocides and atrocities throughout human history, biographies of influential figures, and also advertising, art, comics, dance, fiction, film, music, the photography of victims, poetry, and satire and humor as they relate to genocide, especially when used as propaganda. Most topics dealt with are from the 19th and 20th centuries. In the final volume is a filmography and selection of significant legal documents related to international law, including the Ad hoc international criminal tribunals, the Apartheid Convention, selections from the Geneva Conventions, the Genocide Convention, the Rome Statute, the United Nations Convention Against Torture, and United States v. The Amistad.

== Reception ==
Reviewers compared the Encyclopedia favorably to Israel Charny's Encyclopedia of Genocide, and the Reference and User Services Quarterly described it as "far more comprehensive" than Encyclopedia of Modern Ethnic Conflicts, edited by Joseph R. Rudolph. Steven K. Baum described it as "the most comprehensive and simple-to-use encyclopedia" on the topic, though felt that it was focused on the legal aspects of genocide, lacking in discussion on hate crimes and hate studies, and should have cited more experts in the field of Holocaust and genocide studies. He found the inclusion of topics such as the banality of evil, Infanticide, and Irving v Penguin Books Ltd "unexpected" Adam Jones described it as an ""indespensible reference work" that "miss[ed] nothing of note", though was critical of the lack of coverage of Colombia, and editor's choice to include biographies on figures such as Alija Izetbegović, Mustafa Kemal Atatürk, and Nelson Mandela while omitting standalone biographies of people like Idi Amin, Lothar von Trotha, Kim Il Sung, and Suha. He also felt that that book lacked analysis on the relationship between various as aspects of economics, such as capitalism, communism, sanctions, and blockades, and genocide.

The choice of contributors earnt the book praise from several reviewers; Baum described it as reading a "Who's who of genocide scholarship". The book's editing in particular was praised by Zev Garber, though Garber felt that it had not drawn a clear enough distinction between "active form[s] of prejudice" and "natural bias".

Jones and Baum found some typographical and minor factual errors, though Baum noted that such errors were to be expected given the book's size and breadth of coverage.

== Authors ==
The editor in chief was Dinah Shelton, and the associate editors were Howard Adelman, Frank Chalk, Alexandre Kiss, and William A. Schabas. The volumes were written by over three hundred contributors:

- Heribert Adam
- Howard Adelman
- Reza Afshari
- Xabier Agirre Aranburu
- Payam Akhavan
- Diane Marie Amann
- Peter Amato
- Kai Ambos
- Joyce A. Apsel
- Cynthia J. Arnson
- Edwin Bacon
- Peter Balakian
- Patrick Ball
- Rebecca L. Barbisch
- Dan Bar-On
- M. Cherif Bassiouni
- Craig Baxter
- Chris Bennett
- Michael Berenbaum
- Karel C. Berkhoff
- Robert B. Bernheim
- Louis Bickford
- Kit Bigelow
- Leora Bilsky
- Rudolph Binion
- Laura E. Bishop
- Matthias Bjørnlund
- Karin Solveig Bjornson
- Allida M. Black
- Carolyn Patty Blum
- Marc Bossuyt
- A. B. Bosworth
- Wayne H. Bowen
- Paul S. Boyer
- James Brennan
- Arthur D. Brenner
- Jason Bricker
- Roy L. Brooks
- Bruce Broomhall
- George C. Browder
- Stephen Brown
- Randall L. Bytwerk
- Horace Campbell
- Arturo Carrillo
- Joshua Castellino
- Kathleen Cavanaugh
- John Cerone
- Roger S. Clark
- Sarah Cline
- Robert O. Collins
- Daniele Conversi
- Noble David Cook
- James Crawford
- François Crépeau
- Robert Cribb
- John R. Crook
- Robert Cryer
- Vahakn N. Dadrian
- Erica-Irene A. Daes
- Yael Danieli
- Jamie S. Davidson
- Alfred de Zayas
- Emmanuel Decaux
- Dennis Deletant
- Anna M. Dempsey
- Mercedes Doretti
- Mark A. Drumbl
- James Dunn
- Daniel Elwood Dunn
- Atom Egoyan
- Asbjørn Eide
- Asghar Ali Engineer
- Geraldine D. Enjelvin
- Craig Etcheson
- Lynne Fallwell
- Anat Feinberg
- Stephen C. Feinstein
- Hector Feliciano
- Benjamin B. Ferencz
- Alexander J. Field
- Maribel Fierro
- Robert Fine
- Paul Finkelman
- Michael R. Fischbach
- Conan Fischer
- Luis Fondebrider
- David P. Forsythe
- Michael Freeman
- Michael P. Fronda
- Kelly Helen Fry
- James T. Fussell
- Mercedes García-Arenal
- William Gay
- Christian Gerlach
- Jan-Bart Gewald
- Geoff Gilbert
- James M. Glass
- Leslie C. Griffin
- Alexandra Guerson de Oliveira
- T. Jeremy Gunn
- Vineeta Gupta
- William D. Haglund
- J. Michael Hagopian
- Bernard F. Hamilton
- Ian Hancock
- Hurst Hannum
- John W. Harbeson
- Sidney L. Harring
- Aaron Hass
- Amir Hassanpour
- Robert M. Hayden
- Dawn Marie Hayes
- Priscilla B. Hayner
- Pierre Hazan
- Steve Heder
- Géza Herczegh
- Viktoria Hertling
- Alex Hinton
- Adam Hochschild
- Stan Hoig
- Jan Willem Honig
- Wolfgang K. Hunig
- Martin Imbleau
- Naomi Jackson
- Joshua Jacobson
- Vinodh Jaichand
- Mora Johnson
- Maxine D. Jones
- Christopher C. Joyner
- Karen Jungblut
- Bruce Kapferer
- A. B. Kasozi
- Beverly Mayne Kienzle
- Ben Kiernan
- Linda Kimball
- Christine E. King
- David King
- Alexandre Kiss
- Edward Kissi
- Stephanie Kleine-Ahlbrandt
- John Klier
- Ian Knight
- Geert Jan Alexander Knoops
- Arieh J. Kochavi
- Peter Kornbluh
- Joel Kotek
- Peter Kovacs
- Tania Kramer
- Hans Christian Kruger
- George Lane
- Caroline Lantero
- Bejamin Lawrance
- Azzedine Layachi
- Lawrence J. LeBlanc
- Amy W. Leith
- Rene Lemarchand
- Paul Lemmens
- Xiaorong Li
- Timothy Longman
- Janet E. Lord
- Mark D. Ludwig
- Reneo Lukic
- Lorenz M. Luthi
- Michelle Lyon
- Catharine A. MacKinnon
- Elaine Mackinnon
- Paul Robert Magocsi
- Michael R. Mahoney
- Patrick Manning
- Jean-Bernard Marie
- Stephen P. Marks
- Eric Markusen
- Michael R. Marrus
- Stacie E. Martin
- Jonathan McCollum
- Kevin McDermott
- Avril McDonald
- Russell McGregor
- Fiona McKay
- John McManus
- Matthew McManus
- Geoffrey P. Megargee
- Allan Megill
- Garth Meintjes
- Robert Melson
- Linda Melvern
- Juan E. Mendez
- Raymond A. Mentzer
- Guenael Mettraux
- Wolfgang Mey
- John Michalczyk
- Manus I. Midlarsky
- David Miller
- Virginia P. Miller
- Mark C. Molesky
- Kristen Renwick Monroe
- Brian K. Morgan
- Daryl Mundis
- Ray Murphy
- Sean D. Murphy
- Daniel L. Nadel
- Norman M. Naimark
- Delphine Nakache
- Linda A. Newson
- Francis R. Nicosia
- Daniel Nsereko
- Sharon O'Brien
- Carol Off
- Kolawole Olaniyan
- Clementine Olivier
- Simon Olleson
- Shane P. O'Rourke
- Jeffrey Ostler
- Dennis R. Papazian
- Aloka Parasher Sen
- Gunnar S. Paulsson
- Meg Penrose
- Richard Pilkington
- Douglas V. Porpora
- Jack Nusan Porter
- Greg Poulgrain
- Jerry K. Prince
- R. John Pritchard
- Lyndel V. Prott
- John Quigley
- Renee C. Redman
- Luc Reydams
- Paul Richards
- Andrew Rigby
- Geoffrey Roberts
- Richard Roberts
- Chris A. Robinson
- Nigel S. Rodley
- Naomi Roht-Arriaza
- Peter Ronayne
- Mark Roseman
- John K. Roth
- Daniel Rothenberg
- Paulina Rudnicka
- Leila Sadat
- Jaspreet K. Saini
- Jose M. Sanchez
- Pietro Sardaro
- William F. Sater
- William A. Schabas
- Michael P. Scharf
- David J. Scheffer
- Christian P. Scherrer
- Donald G. Schilling
- Jennifer Schirmer
- Markus Schmidt
- Frederick M. Schweitzer
- John F. Sears
- Paul Seils
- Patricia Viseur Sellers
- Jacques Sémelin
- Harriet F. Senie
- Franziska Seraphim
- Roman Serbyn
- Dinah L. Shelton
- Marlene Shelton
- Franziska E. Shlosser
- Alex Shoumatoff
- Josef Silverstein
- Christopher Simpson
- Tove Skutnabb-Kangas
- Roger W. Smith
- Itai Nartzizenfield Sneh
- Alessia Sonaglioni
- Stefan Sottiaux
- Gregory H. Stanton
- Beth Stephens
- David Stoll
- Christopher Swift
- Nechama Tec
- Rita Thalmann
- Robert A. F. Thurman
- Jiří Toman
- Samuel Totten
- Yvonne S. Unnold
- Stef Vandeginste
- Johan D. van der Vyver
- Robert Jan van Pelt
- Teun Voeten
- Nevena Vuckovic Sahovic
- Natalie Wagner
- Eric D. Weitz
- Mark Weitzman
- Bret Werb
- Dana Wessell
- Stephen J. Whitfield
- Marieke Wierda
- Siegfried Wiessner
- Robert Wokler
- Riidiger Wolfrum
- Linda M. Woolf
- Kathleen Z. Young
- Eyal Zisser
