= November 2009 International Criminal Court judges election =

Special election

- 18 November 2009

2 of 18 seats on the International Criminal Court
- Outgoing judges (Japan) Fumiko Saiga (Guyana) Mohamed Shahabuddeen Elected judges (Japan) Kuniko Ozaki (Argentina) Silvia Fernández de Gurmendi

A special election for two judges of the International Criminal Court was held during the 8th session of the Assembly of States Parties to the Rome Statute of the International Criminal Court in The Hague on 18 November 2009.

The election had become necessary after two judges elected in the January election were unavailable: Mohamed Shahabuddeen of Guyana had resigned before taking office while Fumiko Saiga of Japan had died on 24 April 2009.

== Background ==
The judges elected in this election were chosen to complete the terms, until 10 March 2018, of the judges they replaced.

The election was governed by the Rome Statute of the International Criminal Court. Its article 36(8)(a) states that "[t]he States Parties shall, in the selection of judges, take into account the need, within the membership of the Court, for:

- (i) The representation of the principal legal systems of the world;
- (ii) Equitable geographical representation; and
- (iii) A fair representation of female and male judges."

Furthermore, article 36(3)(b) and 36(5) provide for two lists:

- List A contains those judges that "[h]ave established competence in criminal law and procedure, and the necessary relevant experience, whether as judge, prosecutor, advocate or in other similar capacity, in criminal proceedings";
- List B contains those who "[h]ave established competence in relevant areas of international law such as international humanitarian law and the law of human rights, and extensive experience in a professional legal capacity which is of relevance to the judicial work of the Court".

Each candidate must belong to exactly one list.

Further rules of election were adopted by a resolution of the Assembly of States Parties in 2004.

== Judges remaining in office ==
The following judges were scheduled to remain in office after the election:

Judge	Nationality	List A or B		Regional criteria					Gender	
Judge	Nationality	List A	List B	African	Asian	E. European	GRULAC	WEOG	Female	Male
Bruno Cotte	France	X						X		X
Adrian Fulford	United Kingdom	X						X		X
Hans-Peter Kaul	Germany		X					X		X
Erkki Kourula	Finland		X					X		X
Cuno Tarfusser	Italy	X						X		X
Christine van den Wyngaert	Belgium	X						X	X	
Joyce Aluoch	Kenya	X		X					X	
Fatoumata Dembélé Diarra	Mali	X		X					X	
Akua Kuenyehia	Ghana		X	X					X	
Sanji Mmasenono Monageng	Botswana		X	X					X	
Daniel David Ntanda Nsereko	Uganda	X		X						X
Elizabeth Odio Benito	Costa Rica	X					X		X	
Sylvia Helena de Figueiredo Steiner	Brazil	X					X		X	
Sang-hyun Song	South Korea	X			X					X
Ekaterina Trendafilova	Bulgaria	X				X			X	
Anita Ušacka	Latvia		X			X			X	
		11	5	5	1	2	2	6	9	7

== Nomination process ==
The nomination process for the November 2009 special election began on 13 May 2009 with the announcement of the nomination period from 5 August to 16 September 2009 and of the preliminary minimum voting requirements. On 21 July 2009, the Czech Republic deposited its instrument of ratification of the Rome Statute, and the statute entered into force for it on 1 October 2009, before the election. This made it the 17th State Party from the Group of Eastern European States, triggering an increase in the minimum voting and nomination requirements for that group pursuant to paragraph 20(b) of the 2004 resolution. On 9 September 2009, Estonia, on behalf of the group, sought acknowledgement of its consequent right to nominate candidates, but announced that, "in the spirit of cooperation", the group would refrain from doing so. Since only two vacancies were being filled, this election could not have resolved all three regional underrepresentations at once; a successful Eastern European candidacy would have prevented the two outgoing judges from being replaced by judges from the same groups.

The nomination period was extended three times, to 30 September, 14 October and 28 October 2009, because the minimum nomination requirements of two candidates each from the Asian and Eastern European States were not met: only one Asian candidate and no Eastern European candidate had been nominated. The following persons were nominated:

Candidate	Nationality	List A or B		Regional criteria					Gender	
Candidate	Nationality	List A	List B	African	Asian	E. European	GRULAC	WEOG	Female	Male
Silvia Fernández de Gurmendi	Argentina	X					X		X	
Cecilia Medina Quiroga	Chile		X				X		X	
Marco Gerardo Monroy Cabra	Colombia		X				X			X
Kuniko Ozaki	Japan		X		X				X	
Duke E. E. Pollard	Guyana		X				X			X
		1	4	0	1	0	4	0	3	2

== Minimum voting requirements ==
Minimum voting requirements governed part of the election. This was to ensure that article 36(8)(a) cited above was fulfilled. For this election, the following initial minimum voting requirements applied.

Regarding the List A or B requirement, there was no minimum voting requirement.

Regarding the regional criteria, the original announcement specified voting requirements for one judge from the Asian States and one judge from the Latin American and Caribbean States.

The original calculations were based on 16 Eastern European States Parties and two judges from that region remaining in office, resulting in no Eastern European voting requirement. The Czech Republic's ratification increased the number of States Parties from the region to 17 before the election. Under paragraph 20(b) of the 2004 resolution, this increased the target for representation from the Eastern European States from two judges to three, creating a minimum voting requirement for one judge from that region. The extension notices anticipated this election-day composition.

Regarding the gender criteria, there was no minimum voting requirement.

The regional and gender criteria are adjusted even before the election depending on the number of candidates. Paragraph 20(b) of the 2004 resolution states that if there are less than double the number of candidates required for each region, the minimum voting requirement shall be a (rounded-up) half of the number of candidates; except when there is only one candidate, which results in no voting requirement. Furthermore, if the number of candidates of one gender is less than ten, then the minimum voting requirement shall not exceed a certain number depending on the number of candidates.

The regional and gender criteria are dropped either if they can no longer be (jointly) fulfilled, or if after four ballots not all seats are filled.

The initial voting requirements were as follows:

Criterion	Number of judges required	Number of judges remaining in office	Ex ante voting requirement	Candidates	Adjusted voting requirement	Adjusted requirement equals ex ante?
Lists A or B
List A	9	11	0	1	0	Yes
List B	5	5	0	4	0	Yes
Regional criteria
African states	3	5	0	0	0	Yes
Asian states	2	1	1	1	0	No
Eastern European states	3	2	1	0	0	No
Latin American and Caribbean States	3	2	1	4	1	Yes
Western European and other States	3	6	0	0	0	Yes
Gender criteria
Female	6	9	0	3	0	Yes
Male	6	7	0	2	0	Yes

Because there was only one Asian candidate and no Eastern European candidate, the corresponding requirements were adjusted to zero. Consequently, while three regions were underrepresented before the election, only the requirement to vote for one candidate from the Latin American and Caribbean States remained.

== Ballots ==
All ballots took place on 18 November 2009. The voting totals were as follows:

Name	Nationality	List A or B	Region	Gender	1st round	2nd round	3rd round	4th round	5th round	6th round
Number of States Parties voting					92	89	91	91	89	88
Two-thirds majority					62	60	61	61	60	59
Kuniko Ozaki	Japan	List B	Asian States	Female	79	elected				
Silvia Fernández de Gurmendi	Argentina	List A	Latin American and Caribbean States	Female	36	35	42	49	58	62
Duke E. E. Pollard	Guyana	List B	Latin American and Caribbean States	Male	26	27	32	33	31	26
Cecilia Medina Quiroga	Chile	List B	Latin American and Caribbean States	Female	23	20	17	9	withdrawn	
Marco Gerardo Monroy Cabra	Colombia	List B	Latin American and Caribbean States	Male	13	7	withdrawn			

The minimum voting requirements are imposed on the ballots cast, not on the results. Thus, there is no guarantee that a corresponding number of judges is elected. However, in this election this was the case.

Note that the only minimum voting requirement that initially applied, for one candidate from the Latin American and Caribbean States, was dropped after the 4th ballot and was thus no longer being imposed when a Latin American and Caribbean judge was elected in the sixth ballot; however, at this point only candidates from that group remained.

The two judges elected came from the two regions in which the vacancies had arisen; the new Eastern European underrepresentation remained.
