= Kuniko Ozaki =

Japanese lawyer and judge

Kuniko Ozaki 尾崎久仁子

Second Vice-President of the International Criminal Court
- In office 11 March 2015 – 10 March 2018
- Appointed by: Judges of the ICC
- Preceded by: Cuno Tarfusser
- Succeeded by: Marc Perrin de Brichambaut

Judge of the International Criminal Court
- In office 18 November 2009 – 10 March 2018
- Nominated by: Japan
- Appointed by: Assembly of States Parties

Personal details
- Born: 20 February 1956 (age 70) Hiroshima, Japan

Kuniko Ozaki (尾崎久仁子, Ozaki Kuniko), (born 1956) is a Japanese lawyer who served as judge of the International Criminal Court and the Presiding Judge of Trial Chamber V, constituted to try the cases against four Kenyan nationals. Specially-appointed professor of International Human Right Law at Chuo University Faculty of Law (2021-).

== Early life and career ==
Ozaki graduated from University of Tokyo in 1978 and, in 1982, was awarded an M.Phil. in International Relations at Oxford University.

Afterwards, Ozaki worked in several positions for the Japanese Foreign Ministry. From 2006 to 2009, she worked for the United Nations Office on Drugs and Crime (UNODC) where she was a Director for Treaty Affairs. In addition to her role in the diplomatic service, she has worked as a professor of international law at Tohoku University and at other universities. She also has written on international criminal law and other fields of law.

== Judge of the International Criminal Court, 2010-2018 ==
On 20 January 2010, Ozaki assumed her position as a judge in the Trial Division of the International Criminal Court. While she is no qualified lawyer, she had stressed her experience in lecturing in international law and her time at Japan's Ministry of Justice in responses to a CICC questionnaire at the time of her election on 18 November 2009. She was elected for a term that lasted until 11 March 2018.

Ozaki was assigned to Trial Chamber V which is to try four Kenyan nationals for crimes against humanity. She was elected Presiding Judge. Until 2016, she also served as member of Trial Chamber III for the case of Jean-Pierre Bemba, the first case in which the ICC has found a high official directly responsible for the crimes of his subordinates, as well as the first to focus primarily on crimes of sexual violence committed in war.

In October 2013, Ozaki notably gave a dissenting opinion on the court's majority ruling that conditionally excused President Uhuru Kenyatta of Kenya from attending all the sittings of his trial in The Hague, criticizing the decision of going against the provisions of the Rome Statute. In a September 2014 ruling, the Chamber presided by Ozaki ordered that Kenyatta should physically appear before the court, making him the first head of state to do so.

== Later career ==
In February, 2019, Ozaki was appointed Japan's Ambassador to Estonia and accordingly requested a transfer to part-time status with the ICC. Her decision to continue hearing cases while serving ambassador was criticized as a violation of the ICC's code of ethics, which states that "[j]udges shall not exercise any political function." On 18 April 2019 she resigned as ambassador before taking office and continued being judge in The Hague.

She is a member of the Crimes Against Humanity Initiative Advisory Council, a project of the Whitney R. Harris World Law Institute at Washington University School of Law in St. Louis to establish the world's first treaty on the prevention and punishment of crimes against humanity.
