= Hans Corell =

Swedish lawyer and diplomat

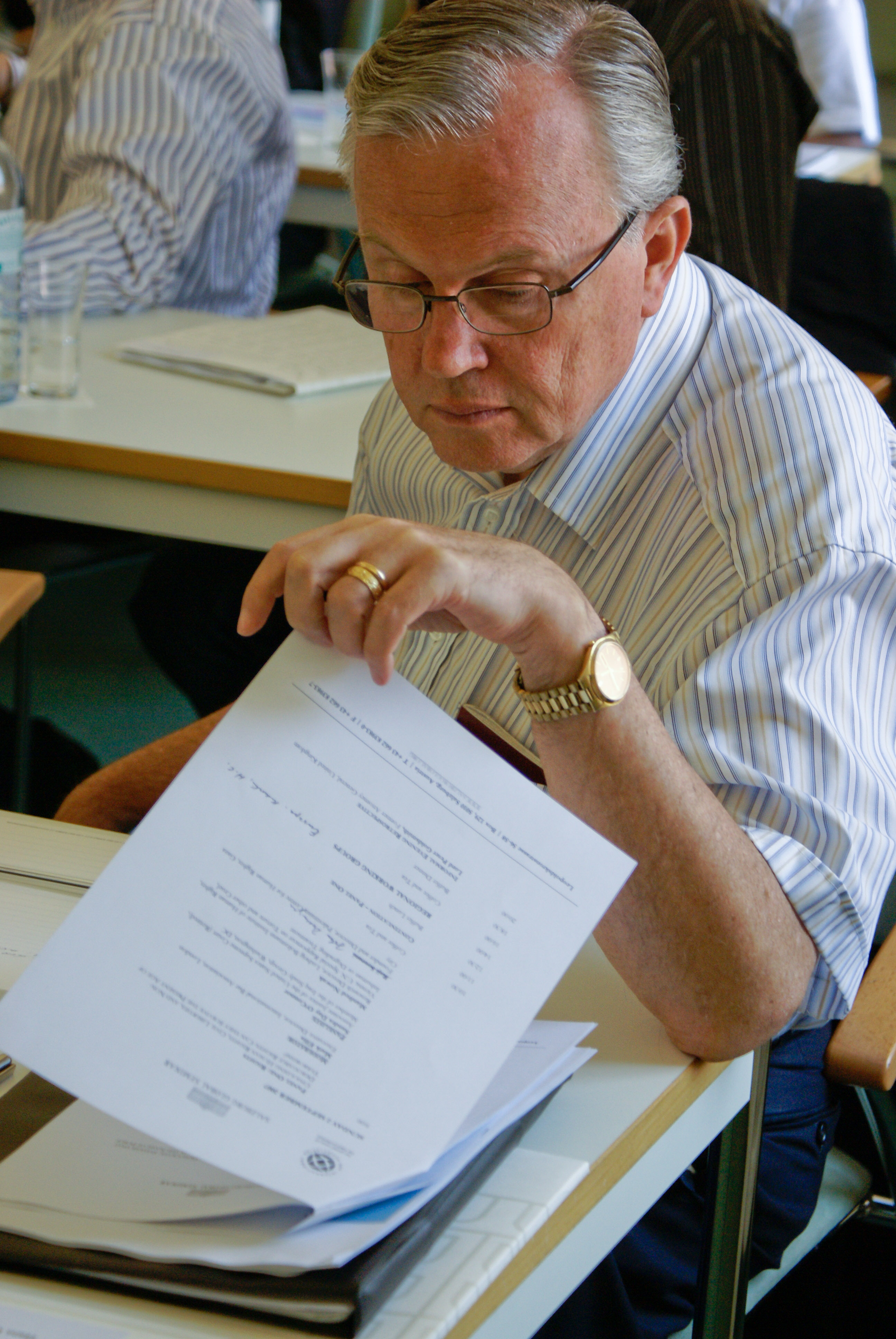
Corell at Salzburg Global Seminar in 2007

Hans Axel Valdemar Corell (born July 7, 1939) is a Swedish lawyer and diplomat. Between March 1994 and March 2004 he was Under-Secretary-General for Legal Affairs and the Legal Counsel of the United Nations. In this capacity, he was head of the Office of Legal Affairs in the United Nations Secretariat.

Before joining the United Nations in 1994, Corell was an Ambassador and Under-Secretary for Legal and Consular Affairs in the Swedish Ministry for Foreign Affairs. Hans Corell graduated with a Master of Laws at Uppsala University. He currently sits on the advisory board of The International Center for Ethics, Justice and Public Life at Brandeis University and on the boards of the Human Rights Institute of the International Bar Association and the International Science Programme. He was chairman of the board of trustees of the Raoul Wallenberg Institute of Human Rights and Humanitarian Law at Lund University from 2006 to 2012.

== The Crimes Against Humanity Initiative ==
Corell is on the Steering Committee of The Crimes Against Humanity Initiative, launched in 2008 by the Whitney R. Harris World Law Institute to study the need for a comprehensive convention on the prevention and punishment of crimes against humanity, analyze the necessary elements of such a convention, and draft a proposed treaty. The proposed treaty is now being debated before the UN International Law Commission.

== World Justice Project ==
Hans Corell serves as an Honorary Co-Chair for the World Justice Project. The World Justice Project works to lead a global, multidisciplinary effort to strengthen the Rule of Law for the development of communities of opportunity and equity.

== Lectures ==
The Role of a Legal Adviser of an International Organization in the Lecture Series of the United Nations Audiovisual Library of International Law

== Awards ==
- Grand Decoration of Honour in Gold with Star for Services to the Republic of Austria (2004)

== See also ==
- Hans Blix
