= Whitaker Report =

The Whitaker Report can refer to:

- Whitaker Report (United Nations). A report into genocide by special rapporteur Benjamin Whitaker, for the Sub-Commission on Prevention of Discrimination and Protection of Minorities, UN Document E/CN.4/Sub.2/ 1985/6, July 2, 1985.
- Whitaker Report (Ireland, 1958) A report into economic development, by the Department of Finance.
- Whitaker Report (Ireland, 1985) A report into the prison system within the Republic of Ireland, published in 1985.
