= Howard Adelman =

Canadian philosopher (1938–2023)

Howard Adelman CM
- Born: January 7, 1938; Toronto, Ontario, Canada
- Died: July 23, 2023 (aged 85)

Philosophical work
- Era: 21st-century philosophers
- Region: Global philosophy
- School: Humanism
- Main interests: Refugees, genocide, immigration
- Notable ideas: Refugees matter

Howard Adelman CM (January 7, 1938 – July 23, 2023) was a Canadian philosopher and university professor. He retired as a professor emeritus of philosophy at York University in 2003. Adelman was one of the founders of Rochdale College, as well as the founder and director of York's Centre for Refugee Studies. He was editor of the journal Refuge for ten years, and since his retirement he has received several honorary university and governmental appointments in Canada and abroad. Adelman was the recipient of numerous awards and grants, and presented the inaugural lecture in a series named in his honor at York University in 2008.

== Biography ==
=== Early life and career ===
Howard Adelman was born January 7, 1938, in Toronto, Ontario. He earned a B.A. (1960), M.A. (1963), and Ph.D. (1971) in philosophy from the University of Toronto, and was a member of the faculty at York University in Toronto from 1966 until his retirement in 2003. As a nineteen-year-old philosophy student, Adelman was hired in 1958 by the Campus Co-operative to meet a growing need for student housing at the University of Toronto. With Adelman's advice, Campus Co-op acquired additional properties and formed Co-operative College Residences Inc., a non-profit offshoot. Later, while a lecturer in philosophy at the University of Toronto (1963–1964) and assistant professor at York University (1966–1970), Adelman was one of the principal founders of Rochdale College, an experimental "free university" organized on the cooperative principle of its British namesake. After obtaining federal mortgages at well below market rates, Campus Co-op incorporated Rochdale College in 1964. An energetic and entrepreneurial spirit with boundless imagination and a playful sense of humor, at that time Adelman was prone to saying he "teaches at the University of Toronto and studies at Rochdale."

Adelman was the founder and director of York's Centre for Refugee Studies (1988–1993) and for ten years he was editor of Canada's periodical on refugees, Refuge until 1993.

=== Service and recognition ===
Adelman served in many university positions at York University, including acting dean of Atkinson College, two terms as director of the graduate program in philosophy, and chair of the Department of Philosophy at York University. He served as Vice-Chair, York University Senate (1980–81), and as its Chair (1981–82). Adelman served as National Chair of Canadian Professors for Peace in the Middle East (1983–84), and Director of the Refugee Documentation Project (1982–86).

In 2008 Adelman was honored as the keynote speaker at the First Annual Howard Adelman Lecture in celebration of the Centre for Refugee Studies’ 20th anniversary. Held during Refugee Rights Week in Toronto, Adelman reviewed recent research on refugees, suggesting it is probably more beneficial than detrimental to assist refugees.

=== Post-retirement ===
After retiring in 2003, Adelman was appointed visiting professor at the Woodrow Wilson School at Princeton University in 2004. In 2008, Adelman became a senior research fellow at the Key Centre for Ethics, Law, Justice and Governance at Griffith University in Brisbane, Australia. He served as the deputy convener of GovNet, a consortium of researchers on governance issues in Australia, and as research director of the International Consortium of Research on Governance of the Health Workforce. He was producer and host of a weekly television program, Israel Today, broadcast in Canada and parts of the United States.

In December 2016, Adelman was named a Member of the Order of Canada.

Howard Adelman died on July 23, 2023, at the age of 85.

== Scholarship ==
The author, coauthor or editor of 23 scholarly books and over 100 articles and book chapters, in addition to numerous other papers, addresses, and professional reports, Adelman has written extensively on the Middle East, humanitarian intervention, membership rights, ethics, early warning and conflict management, refugee repatriation, policy and resettlement, including his contribution in 2000 to the Institutional Component of the Early Warning and Conflict Management System set up by IGAD (Intergovernmental Authority on Development) for the Horn of Africa.

Perhaps best known for his work in applied philosophy concerning refugees, immigration policy and genocide, Adelman published a major study entitled Early Warning and Conflict Management: Joint Evaluation of Emergency Assistance to Rwanda (1996) as part of the 5 volume study International Response to Conflict and Genocide: Lessons from the Rwanda Experience. In 1999, he co-edited The Path of a Genocide: The Rwanda Crisis from Uganda to Zaire, already regarded a classic on the subject. Adelman served as an associate editor for the Macmillan three-volume Encyclopedia of Genocide and Crimes Against Humanity (2005). These efforts earned international acclaim.

His earlier works included publications on social criticism and reform of universities, including The University Game, co-edited with Dennis Lee (1968), The Beds of Academe (1970), and The Holiversity (1973).

=== Selected publications ===
- Military Intervention and Non-Intervention in the Twenty-First Century: An Australian Perspective, with Charles Sampford. 2009. New York: Routledge.
- Rites of Return, with Elazar Barkan. 2009. Princeton, NJ: Princeton University Press.
- Protracted Displacement in Asia: No Place to Call Home. Aldershot, England; Burlington, VT: Ashgate, 2008. ISBN 978-0-7546-7238-8
- "Blaming the United Nations." 2008. Journal of International Political Theory. 4 (April): 9–33
- Encyclopedia of Genocide and Crimes Against Humanity. 3 vols. Edited with Dinah Shelton. Detroit: Thomson/Gale, 2005. ISBN 0-02-865992-9
- War and Peace in Zaire-Congo: Analyzing and Evaluating Intervention, 1996–1997. With Govind C. Rao. Trenton, NJ: Africa World Press, 2004. ISBN 1-59221-130-5
- "From Refugees to Forced Migration: The UNHCR and Human Security. 2001. International Migration Review 35 (Spring 2001): 7–32.
- "Rwanda Revisited: In Search for Lessons." 2000. Journal of Genocide Research 2: 431–444.
- "Preventing Genocide: The Case of Rwanda," In Genocide: Essays Toward Understanding Early-Warning and Prevention, Roger W. Smith, ed. Williamsburg: Virginia: Association of Genocide Scholars, 1999.
- The Path of a Genocide: The Rwanda Crisis from Uganda to Zaire. Edited with Astri Suhrke. New Brunswick, NJ: Transaction Publishers, 1999.
- "The Ethics of Intervention – Rwanda." In Dilemmas of Intervention: Sovereignty vs. Responsibility. Richard H. Ulman and Michael Keren, eds. London: Frank Cass Publications, 1999.
- "Control and Prevention: Canadian Refugee Policy: The Case of Rwanda." In Immigration and Refugee Policy: Canada and Europe. Howard Adelman, ed. Toronto: University of Toronto Press, 1998.
- "Difficulties in Early Warning: Networking and Conflict Management." In Early Warning and Conflict Prevention: Limitations and Opportunities. Alfred van Staden and Klaas van Walraven, eds. The Hague: Kluwer Law International, 1998.
- Early Warning: Theory and Practice. Edited with Susan Schmeidl. New York: Columbia University Press On Line, 1998.
- "Early Warning and Prevention: The Case of Rwanda," In Refugee Rights and Realities: Evolving International Concepts and Regimes. Frances Nicholson, ed. Cambridge: Cambridge University Press, 1998.
- "Lamentations: The Death and Rebirth of the Civil Society or The Wisdom of the Alien Other in a Global Civilization." In Devolution and Post-Multiculturalism, Michael Lanphier, ed. Toronto: Artemis, 1998.
- Membership and Dismemberment: The Body Politic and Genocide in Rwanda. New York: Columbia University Press, Columbia International Affairs Online, 1998.
- "Modernity, Globalization, Refugees and Displacement." In Refugees, Contemporary Perspectives on the Experience of Forced Migration, Alastair Ager, ed. New York: Cassell Publishers, 1998.
- "State Crime and Migration" In Migration and Crime, Alex P. Schmid, ed. Milan: ISPAC, 1998.
- "Why Refugee Warriors Are Threats." 1998. Journal of Conflict Studies 18 (Spring): 49–69.
- "The Failure to Prevent Genocide: The Case of Rwanda." 1997. Mediterranean Social Sciences Review 2 (Winter): 41–65.
- "Of Human Bondage: Labour, Bondage and Freedom in the Phenomenology." In Essays on Hegel's Phenomenology of Spirit, Jon Stewart, ed. Albany: SUNY Press, 1997.
- "Preventing Massacre: The Case of Kibeho." In The Rwanda Crisis: Healing and Protection Strategies, Sally Gacharuzi, ed. Kensington, MD: Overview Press, 1997.
- Early Warning and Conflict Management, Volume 2 of The International Response to Conflict and Genocide: Lessons from the Rwanda Experience, edited with Astri Suhrke. Copenhagen: DANIDA, 1996.
- "Early Warning and Response: Why the International Community Failed to Prevent the Genocide," with Astri Suhrke. 1996. Disasters: The Journal of Disaster Studies and Management 20 (December).
- "Indifference versus Sentiment." 1996. New Routes: A Journal of Peace Research and Action 1: 11–30.
- Multiculturalism, Jews, and Identities in Canada. With John H. Simpson. Jerusalem: Magnes Press, 1996. ISBN 965-223-920-8
- "The Right of Repatriation - Canadian Refugee Policy: The Case of Rwanda." 1996. International Migration Review 30(Spring), 289–309.
- "Canada, Quebec and Refugee Claimants." In Is Quebec Nationalism Just: Perspectives from Anglophone Canada. Joseph Carens, ed. McGill-Queens University Press, 1995.
- Legitimate and Illegitimate Discrimination: New Issues in Migration. Geneva: UNESCO; York Lanes Press, 1995.
- African Refugees: Development Aid and Repatriation. Edited with John Sorenson. Boulder: Westview Press, 1994. ISBN 0-8133-8460-5
- Canadian Immigration and Refugee Policy and Practice. Berlin: Edition Parabolis, 1994. ISBN 3-88402-170-2
- The Genesis of a Domestic Regime: The Case of Hungary. With Endre Sik and Geza Tessenyi. Toronto: York Lanes Press, 1994. ISBN 1-55014-237-2
- "Immigrants and Refugees: Between the Pre-Modern and the Post-Modern World." 1994. Jahrbuch für Vergeichende Sozialforschung. Berlin: Edition Parabolis, 133–156.
- Immigration and Refugee Policy: Australia and Canada Compared. 2 vols. Toronto: University of Toronto Press, 1994. ISBN 0-8020-7608-4 (v. 1) 0802076092 (v. 2)
- "Refugees: A Conceptual View of Current Research and Towards a Research Framework for the 1990s." In Crossing Borders: Transmigration in Asia Pacific. Ong Jin Hui, Chan Kwok Bun and Chew Soon Beng, eds. Singapore: Prentice Hall; Simon & Schuster, 1994.
- "What Can Europe Learn from Canada?" 1994. Migration: A European Journal of International Migration and Ethnic Relations 1–2: 5–14.
- "The Ethics of Humanitarian Intervention: The Case of the Kurdish Refugees." 1992. Public Affairs Quarterly 6: 61–88.
- "Humanitarian Intervention: The Case of the Kurds," 1992. International Journal of Refugee Law 4: 4–38.
- Refugee Policy: Canada and the United States. Toronto: York University, Centre for Refugee Studies; Staten Island, NY: Center for Migration Studies of New York, 1991. ISBN 0-934733-63-5
- Refuge or Asylum? A Choice for Canada. With C. Michael Lanphier. Toronto: York Lanes Press, 1990. ISBN 1-55014-114-7
- The Indochinese Refugee Movement: The Canadian Experience. Toronto: Operation Lifeline, 1980. ISBN 0-9690599-0-6
- "The physiology of the university." Higher Education 7(February): 87–93, 1978.
- The Holiversity. Toronto: New Press, 1973. ISBN 0-88770-694-0
- Rational Explanation in History. Ph.D. Thesis, University of Toronto. Ottawa: National Library of Canada. Canadian Theses on Microfilm, #11528. Public Archives of Canada, Central Microfilm Unit, 1972.
- The Beds of Academe. Toronto: Praxis Press, 1969.
- The University Game, co-edited with Dennis Lee. Toronto: House of Anansi Press, 1968.
