= 2007 International Criminal Court judges election =

- 30 November and 3 December 2007

3 of 18 seats on the International Criminal Court
- Outgoing judges (France) Claude Jorda (Republic of Ireland) Maureen Harding Clark (Trinidad and Tobago) Karl T. Hudson-Phillips Elected judges (Japan) Fumiko Saiga (France) Bruno Cotte (Uganda) Daniel Nsereko

A special election for three judges of the International Criminal Court was held during the 6th session of the Assembly of States Parties to the Rome Statute of the International Criminal Court in New York on 30 November and 3 December 2007.

The election was to replace three judges who had resigned during 2006 and 2007.

== Background ==
The judges elected at this election took office on the date of their elections. Two were to remain in office until 10 March 2012, one judge (to be chosen by drawing of lots) until 10 March 2009.

The election was governed by the Rome Statute of the International Criminal Court. Its article 36(8)(a) states that "[t]he States Parties shall, in the selection of judges, take into account the need, within the membership of the Court, for:

- (i) The representation of the principal legal systems of the world;
- (ii) Equitable geographical representation; and
- (iii) A fair representation of female and male judges."

Furthermore, article 36(3)(b) and 36(5) provide for two lists:

- List A contains those judges that "[h]ave established competence in criminal law and procedure, and the necessary relevant experience, whether as judge, prosecutor, advocate or in other similar capacity, in criminal proceedings";
- List B contains those who "[h]ave established competence in relevant areas of international law such as international humanitarian law and the law of human rights, and extensive experience in a professional legal capacity which is of relevance to the judicial work of the Court".

Each candidate must belong to exactly one list.

Further rules of election were adopted by a resolution of the Assembly of States Parties in 2004.

== Judges remaining in office ==
The following judges were to remain in office after the election:

Judge	Nationality	List A or B		Regional criteria					Gender	
Judge	Nationality	List A	List B	African	Asian	E. European	GRULAC	WEOG	Female	Male
Adrian Fulford	United Kingdom	X						X		X
Hans-Peter Kaul	Germany		X					X		X
Philippe Kirsch	Canada		X					X		X
Erkki Kourula	Finland		X					X		X
Mauro Politi	Italy		X					X		X
Fatoumata Dembélé Diarra	Mali	X		X					X	
Akua Kuenyehia	Ghana		X	X					X	
Navanethem Pillay	South Africa		X	X					X	
René Blattmann	Bolivia		X				X			X
Elizabeth Odio Benito	Costa Rica	X					X		X	
Sylvia Helena de Figueiredo Steiner	Brazil	X					X		X	
Georghios M. Pikis	Cyprus	X			X					X
Sang-hyun Song	South Korea	X			X					X
Ekaterina Trendafilova	Bulgaria	X				X			X	
Anita Ušacka	Latvia		X			X			X	
Totals		7	8	3	2	2	3	5	7	8

== Nomination process ==
The nomination period of judges for the 2007 election lasted from 1 June to 24 August 2007. The following persons were nominated:

Name	Nationality	List A or B		Regional criteria					Gender	
Name	Nationality	List A	List B	African	Asian	E. European	GRULAC	WEOG	Female	Male
Bruno Cotte	France	X						X		X
Graciela Dixon	Panama	X					X		X	
Daniel Nsereko	Uganda	X		X						X
Jean Angela Permanand	Trinidad and Tobago	X					X		X	
Fumiko Saiga	Japan		X		X				X	
		4	1	1	1	0	2	1	3	2

The candidature of Sunday Akinola Akintan of Nigeria was withdrawn on 20 September 2007.

== Minimum voting requirements ==
Minimum voting requirements governed part of the election. This was to ensure that article 36(8)(a) cited above is fulfilled. For this election, the following minimum voting requirements applied initially.

Regarding the List A or B requirement, there was a minimum voting requirement of two judges from List A.

Regarding the regional criteria, there was no minimum voting requirement.

Regarding the gender criteria, there was no minimum voting requirement.

The regional and gender requirements could have been adjusted before the election depending on the number of candidates, pursuant to paragraphs 20 (b) and (c) of the 2004 resolution.

The minimum voting requirements are updated after each ballot to account for the judges already elected. The regional and gender requirements are dropped either if they can no longer be (jointly) fulfilled, or if after four ballots not all seats are filled. The List A or B requirement remains active until a sufficient number of judges has been elected from each list.

The voting requirements were as follows:

Criterion	Number of judges required	Number of judges remaining in office	Ex ante voting requirement	Number of candidates	Adjusted voting requirement	Adjusted requirement equals ex ante?
Lists A or B
List A	9	7	2	4	2	Yes
List B	5	8	0	1	0	Yes
Regional criteria
African states	3	3	0	1	0	Yes
Asian states	2	2	0	1	0	Yes
Eastern European states	2	2	0	0	0	Yes
Latin American and Caribbean States	3	3	0	2	0	Yes
Western European and other States	3	5	0	1	0	Yes
Gender criteria
Female	6	7	0	3	0	Yes
Male	6	8	0	2	0	Yes

== Ballots ==
The first two ballots took place on 30 November 2007. The other two ballots took place on 3 December 2007.

The ballot results were as follows:

Name	Nationality	List A or B	Region	Gender	1st round	2nd round	3rd round	4th round
Number of States Parties voting					105	104	102	102
Two-thirds majority					70	69	68	68
Fumiko Saiga	Japan	List B	Asian States	Female	82	elected		
Bruno Cotte	France	List A	Western European and Other States	Male	79	elected		
Daniel Nsereko	Uganda	List A	African States	Male	54	53	60	74
Graciela Dixon	Panama	List A	Latin American and Caribbean States	Female	45	25	21	28
Jean Angela Permanand	Trinidad and Tobago	List A	Latin American and Caribbean States	Female	50	26	21	withdrawn

The minimum voting requirements are imposed on the ballots cast, not on the results. Thus, there is no guarantee that a corresponding number of judges is elected. However, in this election this was the case, as two List A judges were elected.

The drawing of lots on 3 December had Saiga serve until 10 March 2009 and Cotte and Nsereko until 10 March 2012.
