= Noble David Cook =

Historian (1941–2024)

Noble David Cook (1941 - April 8, 2024) was a historian and author who studied the history of colonial Peru. He taught at the Florida International University from 1992, and was made a professor emeritus there in 2017.

== Career ==
Cook earnt a master's degree from University of Florida, then moved to study at the University of Texas at Austin for a PhD in history under Nicolás Sánchez-Albornoz. He graduated in 1972. In 1981, Cook published Demographic Collapse: Indian Peru, 1520–1620, in which he modelled population decline in and analyzed the demographics of Peru during Spanish colonialism. He largely wrote the book based on research he conducted in Peru during the 1970s.

He taught at University of Bridgeport in Connecticut. While there, he received a Guggenheim Fellowship in 1991 for his work on Iberian and Latin American History. Cook transferred to Florida International University in 1992. In 2005, he wrote about the Taíno for volume three of the Encyclopedia of Genocide and Crimes Against Humanity. In 2007 he was made a professor emeritus at FIU and, in 2008, was made an honorary professor of the humanities at Pontifical Catholic University of Peru.

== Personal life ==
Cook was born in 1941. He was married to Alexandra Parma Cook, and the couple had one child. He died on April 8, 2024. A year before his death, he had been diagnosed with cancer.

He and his family were close friends with Peruvian historians Franklin Pease García-Yrigoyen and Mariana Mould de Pease.

== Bibliography ==
=== Authored ===
- ————— (1981). Demographic Collapse: Indian Peru, 1520–1620. Cambridge University Press.
- ————— (1982). The People Of The Colca Valley: A Population Study. Westview Press.
- ————— (1998). Born to Die: Disease and New World Conquest, 1492-1650. Cambridge University Press.
- —————; Cook, Alexandra Parma (1991). Good Faith and Truthful Ignorance: A Case of Transatlantic Bigamy. Duke University Press. ISBN 978-0-8223-1222-2.
- ————— (2005). "Taino (Arawak) Indians". In Shelton, Dinah (ed.). Encyclopedia of Genocide and Crimes Against Humanity. Vol. 3. Louisiana State University Press.
- —————; Cook, Alexandra Parma (2009). The Plague Files: Crisis Management in Sixteenth-Century Seville. Louisiana State University Press.
- —————; Cook, Alexandra Parma (2007). People of the Volcano: Andean Counterpoint in the Colca Valley of Peru. Duke University Press.
- —————; Cook, Alexandra Parma (2023). Luis Gerónimo de Oré: The World of an Andean Franciscan from the Frontiers to the Centers of Power. Louisiana State University Press.

=== Edited ===
- —————; Johnson, Lyman L., eds. (1990). Essays on the Price History of Eighteenth-Century Latin America. University of New Mexico Press.
