= Sub-Commission on the Promotion and Protection of Human Rights =

The Sub-Commission on the Promotion and Protection of Human Rights (before 1999, known as the Sub-Commission on Prevention of Discrimination and Protection of Minorities) was a subsidiary agency of the United Nations Commission on Human Rights established in 1947. Its mandate was directed towards the prevention of discrimination and the protection of racial, national, religious and linguistic minorities. It was wound up in late August 2006.

With the dissolution of the Commission on Human Rights and its replacement by the Human Rights Council in 2006, responsibility for the Sub-Commission passed from the former to the latter. On 30 June 2006 the Council resolved to extend the Sub-Commission's mandate on an exceptional one-year basis and subject to the Council's subsequent review. The Sub-Commission met for the final time in August 2006; among the recommendations it adopted at that session was one for the creation of a human rights consultative committee as a standing body to assist the Human Rights Council.

== Organisation ==
The Sub-Commission was first formed in 1947, under the auspices of the Economic and Social Council (ECOSOC). Its primary mandate is described as "to undertake studies, particularly in the light of the Universal Declaration of Human Rights, and to make recommendations to the Commission concerning the prevention of discrimination of any kind relating to human rights and fundamental freedoms and the protection of racial, national, religious and linguistic minorities".

Other functions and tasks could also be assigned to it by ECOSOC or the Commission on Human Rights.

It was composed of 26 human rights experts, each with an alternate and each elected for a term of four years, with half of the posts up for election every two years. Membership was selected from amongst the eligible candidates from United Nations member states in such a way as to result in roughly equal and proportional representation from each of the continents.

As of 2004, the breakdown of membership was:

- 7 from African States,
- 5 from Asian States,
- 5 from Latin American States,
- 3 from Eastern European States,
- 6 from Western European and other States.

The Sub-Commission had eight working groups to conduct studies on discriminatory practices and make recommendations to ensure that racial, national, religious and linguistic minorities were protected by law.

- Working Group on Administration of Justice
- Working Group on Communication
- Working Group on Contemporary Forms of Slavery
- Working Group on Indigenous Populations
- Working Group on Minorities
- Working Group on Social Forum
- Working Group on Transnational Corporations
- Working Group on Terrorism

== Genocide ==
By the middle of the 1970s the Genocide Convention had not been ratified by all of the members of the security council and appeared to be moribund after 20 years of inaction. Members of the Sub-Commission on Prevention of Discrimination and Protection of Minorities decided to investigate the subject and over the next decade launched a number of initiatives. which included publication of the Ruhashyankiko report in 1978 and the Whitaker report in 1985.

=== Ruhashyankiko Report ===
Nicodème Ruhashyankiko was appointed as a special Rapporteur in 1973 and produced a report The Study on the Question of the Prevention and Punishment of the Crime of Genocide, that was approved by the Sub-Commission at its thirty first session (E/CN.4/Sub.2/416, 4 July 1979. The report was forwarded to the United Nations Commission on Human Rights (UNCHR) with a recommendation that it be given the widest possible distribution, and the UNCHR made a decision to do so.

Much of Ruhashyankiko's report was not found by the sub-committee to be controversial, for example his suggestion that the crime of genocide, like the crime of piracy, should be covered by universal jurisdiction, and that an international criminal court be set up to try those accused of genocide.

However, as his review of historical genocide ignited a political debate, Ruhashyankiko took the conservative line that it was impossible to draw up an exhaustive list and that attempting to do so could reignite old quarrels and be unacceptable to all of the member states of the United Nations. This drew the criticism of one member of the Sub-Commission who complained that "genocide of the Palestinians" had been omitted. But most of the criticism concerned a change which Ruhashyankiko made between the first draft and the final version of the report. The first draft had cited the Armenian genocide, but that reference was deleted from the final version due to pressure from Turkey, an omission that was supported by only one member. Ruhashyankiko justified his omission of the Armenian genocide and the inclusion of the Jewish genocide by explaining that the Holocaust was universally recognised while the Armenian genocide was not. In the end the Sub-Commission sent the report with some amendments resulting from the debate within the Sub-Commission to the (UNCHR) with a recommendation that it should be widely distributed. Although the UNCHR accepted the recommendation and passed the resolution to enable its distribution, the foreseen distribution never took place, leaving copies of the report to be found only in the research libraries of some major universities

Mitsue Inazumi draws the conclusion from the political debate that the Ruhashyankiko report started, that it was evocative of how divisive the dispute over historical genocides and alleged historical genocides is, while William Schabas draws the conclusion that Ruhashyankiko backed down in naming the Armenian massacres as a genocide under the pressure from the Turkish state, and that "Ruhashyankiko's unpardonable wavering on the Armenian genocide cast a shadow over what was otherwise an extremely helpful and well-researched report".

=== Whitaker Report ===
By 1982, persisting hostility to Ruhashyankiko's handling of the Armenian issue led the Sub-Commission to consider a new report on genocide. In 1983, it requested that the Commission On Human Rights ask the Economic and Social Council [ECOSOC] to appoint a new Special Rapporteur to undertake the task. Sub-Commission member Ben Whitaker of the United Kingdom was appointed to the position and mandated to write a revised, updated study. His study, Revised and Updated Report on the Question of the Prevention and Punishment of the Crime of Genocide, was received and noted by a resolution at the thirty-eighth session of the Sub-Commission in 1985. (E/CN.4/Sub.2/1985/6, 2 July 1985).

The report consisted of a Forward, an Introduction, an Appendix, and four principal parts: Part I, Historical Survey; Part II, The Convention On The Prevention and Punishment of The Crime of Genocide; Part III, Future progress: The Possible Ways Forward; Part IV, List of Recommendations. It made a number of controversial proposals including recommendations that the Genocide Convention should be altered to include protection of groups based on politics and sexual orientation. Also "advertent omission" should become a crime and the defence of obeying superior orders should be removed. The report also suggested that consideration should be given to ecocide, ethnocide, and cultural genocide.

The report created further controversy, because in paragraph 24 it stated that

The Nazi aberration has unfortunately not been the only case of genocide in the twentieth century. Among other examples which can be cited as qualifying are the German massacre of Hereros in 1904, the Ottoman massacre of Armenians in 1915–1916, the Ukrainian pogrom of Jews in 1919, the Tutsi massacre of Hutu in Burundi in 1965 and 1972, the Paraguayan massacre of Ache Indians prior to 1974, the Khmer Rouge massacre in Kampuchea between 1975 and 1978, and the contemporary [1985] Iranian killings of Baha'is.

— Whitaker Report, (paragraph 24).

In the debates over whether to accept the report the Sub-Commission's final report stated:

According to various speakers, the Special Rapporteur had correctly interpreted his mandate in referring, for instance in paragraph 24 of his report, to specific cases of allegations of genocide in past. The lessons of history were indispensable to keep the conscience of the world alive, and prevent the recurrence of that odious crime. Other participants felt that the Special Rapporteur should have dealt exclusively with the problem of preventing future genocides, without referring to past events which were difficult or impossible to investigate. Turning specifically to the question of the massacre of the Armenians, the view was expressed by various speakers that such massacres indeed constituted genocide, as was well documented by the Ottoman military trials of 1919, eyewitness reports and official archives. Objecting to such a view, various participants argued that the Armenian massacre was not adequately documented and that certain evidence had been forged.

— Sub-Commissions final report, paragraphs 41,42.

That opinions of the Sub-Commission were split came to the fore over the wording of the resolution to accept the report. In the end the second and weaker of two proposed resolutions was adopted, one that took note of the study and thanked Whitaker for his efforts and also noted "that divergent opinions have been expressed about the content and proposals of the report". Schabas states that "An attempt to strengthen the resolution by expressing the Sub-Commissions's thanks and congratulations for 'some' of the proposals in the report was resoundingly defeated". (Note: The sources are somewhat split on this interpretation of the Sub-Commission's response to the Whitaker Report with some stating that the report was endorsed: The report was adopted by a 15–4 majority of the panel of experts in the Sub-Commission, thereby recognizing the massacres of Armenians in 1915–16 as genocide. [38 U.N. ESCOR Commission On Human Rights, Sub-Commission. on Prevention of Discrimination and Protection of Minorities, (Agenda Item 4), 8–9, U.N. Doc. E/CN.4/Sub.2/1985/6 (1985)]. — (Genocide Education Project p. 1 footnote 1) and others stating it was not: The Turkish government intervened to advocate deletion of the mention of genocide. These debates resulted in a resolution that simply took note of Whitaker's report, but stopped short of endorsing it. — Stephanie Kleine-Ahlbrandt. (Kleine-Ahlbrandt 2006))

=== 1990s ===
The Sub-Commission revisited genocide in 1993 and in 1994 recommended that an international court statute be prepared to facilitate the prosecution of genocide. It also recommended that an international committee be created to examine reports by States into their undertakings under Article 5 of the Genocide Convention. The committee also followed up on one of the Ruhashyankiko Reports ideas and suggested that the convention be improved by including a clause enabling the crime of genocide to be tried under universal jurisdiction.

In a resolution dated 3 August 1995 the Sub-Commission concluded "that a veritable genocide is being committed massively and in a systematic manner against the civilian population in Bosnia and Herzegovina, often in the presence of United Nations forces".

Later the same month on 18 August, the Sub-Commission passed another resolution explicitly mentioning Radio Démocratie-La Voix du Peuple, which had been stirring up genocidal hatred in Burundi.

== Human rights and weapons of mass destruction ==
The Sub-Commission passed two motions, the first in 1996 and the second in 1997. They listed weapons of mass destruction, or weapons with indiscriminate effect, or of a nature to cause superfluous injury or unnecessary suffering and urged all states to curb the production and the spread of such weapons. The committee authorized a working paper, in the context of human rights and humanitarian norms, of the weapons. The requested UN working paper was delivered in 2002 by Y.K.J. Yeung Sik Yuen in accordance with Sub-Commission's resolution 2001/36.

== Bibliography ==
- Fournet, Caroline (2007). The crime of destruction and the law of genocide: their impact on collective memory, Ashgate Publishing, Ltd., ISBN 0-7546-7001-5, ISBN 978-0-7546-7001-8.
- Inazumi, Mitsue (2005). Universal jurisdiction in modern international law: expansion of national jurisdiction for prosecuting serious crimes under international law, Intersentia nv, ISBN 90-5095-366-2, ISBN 978-90-5095-366-5
- Kleine-Ahlbrandt, Stephanie (2006) [2005]. "United Nations Sub-Commission on Human Rights". In Shelton, Dinah L (ed.). Encyclopedia of Genocide and Crimes Against Humanity. eNotes.com. Archived from the original on 17 May 2008.
- Schabas, William (2000). Genocide in international law: the crimes of crimes, Cambridge University Press, ISBN 0-521-78790-4, ISBN 978-0-521-78790-1
- Thornberry, Patrick. International Law and the Rights of Minorities, Oxford University Press, 1993 ISBN 0-19-825829-1, ISBN 978-0-19-825829-2
- Toriguian, Shavarsh. The Armenian question and international law, ULV Press, 1988.
- Whitaker, Benjamin (1985). Whitaker Report, Prevent Genocide International
