= Nigel Rodley =

British lawyer and professor

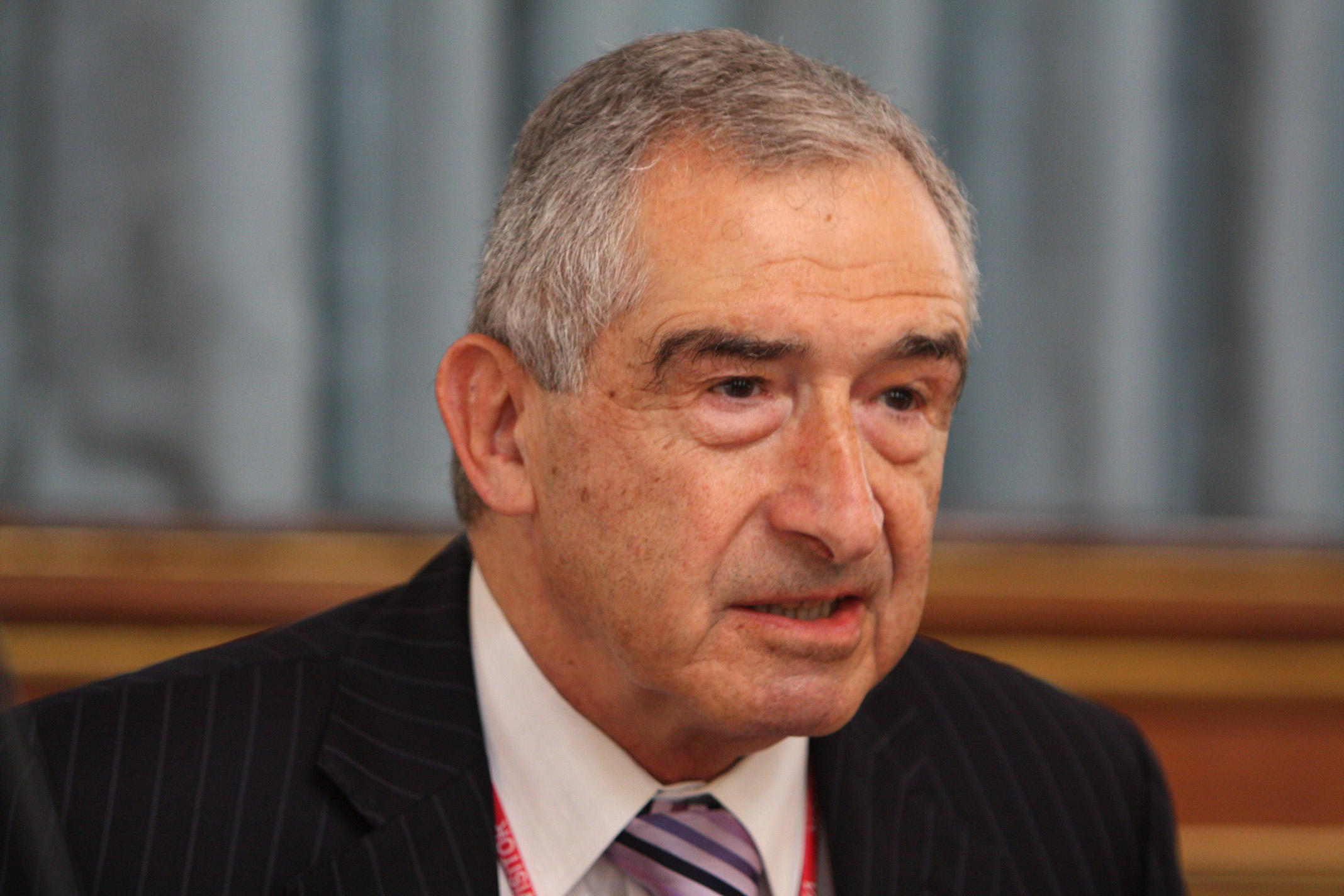
Sir Nigel S. Rodley in 2015

Sir Nigel Simon Rodley KBE (born Rosenfeld; 1 December 1941 – 25 January 2017) was an international lawyer and professor.

== Personal life ==
Rodley was born in the West Riding of Yorkshire on 1 December 1941 to Hans Israel Rosenfeld and Rachel (née Kantorowitz). His parents later changed their name to Rodley. His father, who served in the British Army under the name John Peter Rodley, was killed in action in the Netherlands in September 1944 (at Stationsweg 8 in Arnhem, buried at Airborne War Cemetery in Oosterbeek). He was educated at Clifton College, where he was a member of Polack's, the Jewish boarding house. He was of Jewish descent.

As well as his native English, he spoke French, German, and Spanish.

Rodley married Lynette Bates in Leeds in 1967. He died aged 75 on 25 January 2017.

== Professional positions ==
Rodley was:

- a member of the UN Human Rights Committee, a body of 18 human rights experts that monitors UN member states' compliance with the International Covenant on Civil and Political Rights(between 2001 and 2016), and
- a Commissioner of the International Commission of Jurists,
- a founding member and former Executive Committee Vice-chairman of INTERIGHTS: International Centre for the Legal Protection of Human Rights.
- a member of the executive committee of the David Davies Memorial Institute of International Studies.
- a trustee of Freedom from Torture.
- a member of the International Independent Group of Eminent Persons, (IIGEP), a group of experts invited by the President of Sri Lanka Mahinda Rajapaksa to observe the workings of a Presidential Commission of Inquiry into serious Human Rights violations in Sri Lanka,
- a member of the Crimes Against Humanity Initiative Advisory Council, a project of the Whitney R. Harris World Law Institute at Washington University School of Law in St. Louis to establish the world's first treaty on the prevention and punishment of crimes against humanity.

== Education ==
Rodley had degrees from:

- LLD – Dalhousie University, 2000 (honorary)
- PhD – University of Essex, 1992
- LLM – New York University, 1970
- LLM – Columbia University, 1965
- LLB – University of Leeds, 1963

== Academic posts ==
Most recently, he was:

- Professor of Law and Chair of the Human Rights Centre, University of Essex, having taught there since 1990.

He had formerly taught at:

- Dalhousie University,
- the Graduate Faculty of the New School for Social Research (New York), and
- the London School of Economics.

== Former positions ==
He was formerly:

- UN Special Rapporteur on torture, serving in this capacity from 1993 to 2001,
- working at UN Headquarters in New York City,
- for Amnesty International, Legal Advisor and Head of the Legal and Intergovernmental Organisations Office (1973–1990),

== Publications ==
Published works include:

- (with Matt Pollard) The Treatment of Prisoners under International Law (3rd edition, 2009);
- (with Matt Pollard) "Criminalisation of Torture: State Obligations under the United Nations Convention against Torture and Other Cruel, Inhuman or Degrading Treatment or Punishment" 2006[2] European Human Rights Law Review 115 (2006);
- The UN Human Rights Machinery and International Criminal Law, in Lattimer and Sands (eds.), Justice for Crimes against Humanity (2003, Hart Publishing);
- "The Definition(s) of Torture in International Law" in Current Legal Problems. p467 (2002)
- The Treatment of Prisoners under International Law (1st edition 1987, 2nd edition 1999);
- Impunity of Human Rights (1998);
- (co-ed with Y Danieli and L Weisaeth) International Responses to Traumatic Stress (1995);
- (ed) To Loose the Bands of Wickedness – International Intervention in Defence of Human Rights (1992);
- (with J I Domniguez, B Wood and R A Falk) Enhancing Global Human Rights (1979);
- (co-ed with C N Ronning) International Law in the Western Hemisphere (1974);

In 2010, Routledge published The Delivery of Human Rights: Essays in Honour of Professor Sir Nigel Rodley, edited by his colleagues Geoff Gilbert, Francoise Hampson, and Clara Sandoval.

== Lectures ==
- United Nations Treaty and Charter-based Human Rights Bodies: Competitive or Complementary? in the Lecture Series of the United Nations Audiovisual Library of International Law

== Awards ==
- Recipient of the American Society of International Law's 2005 Goler T. Butcher Medal for distinguished work in human rights.
- A KBE in recognition of his services to human rights and international law (1998).
