= International Independent Group of Eminent Persons =

Former Sri Lankan entity

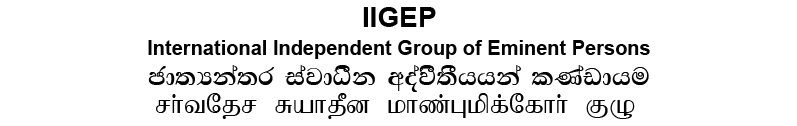

The International Independent Group of Eminent Persons, abbreviated to IIGEP, was a group of individuals nominated by international donor countries and the government of Sri Lanka in 2006, vested with a wide mandate to observe all investigations and inquiries conducted by and on behalf of the Commission of Inquiry into alleged human rights abuses in Sri Lanka.

== Members ==
The following individuals were members of the IIGEP:

- Justice P.N. Bhagwati, India – Chairman, invited by the President
- Prof. Ivan Shearer, nominated by Australia
- Prof. Bruce Matthews, nominated by Canada
- Mr. Bernard Kouchner, France, nominated by the European Commission
- Judge Jean-Pierre Cot, France, nominated by the European Commission and replacing Mr. Kouchner
- Prof. Sir Nigel Rodley, nominated by the UK
- Prof. Yozo Yokota, nominated by Japan
- Cees Fasseur, nominated by the Netherlands
- Arthur “Gene” Dewey, nominated by USA
- Mr. Marzuki Darusman, (nominated by the Inter-Parliamentary Union)
- Kamal Hussein, Bangladesh (nominated by OHCHR)
- Mr. Andres Mauromatis, Cyprus (nominated by GoSL)

== Mandate ==
The mandate of the IIGEP has come under criticism from several human rights organisations, underlining its inherent weaknesses, including:

IIGEP did not have independent access to witnesses or conduct independent investigations, and the Commission of Inquiry early indicated that IIGEP were to observe and not investigate. The reports of the IIGEP where submitted to the President, who has the power to veto publication of information sensitive to national security - this is seen as especially disturbing given that Sri Lankan armed forces have been implicated in several of the killings that are to be investigated by the Commission of Inquiry. None of IIGEPs reports to the President have been publicized so far.

== Resignation ==
The members of IIGEP at their November 2007 plenary concluded that they would terminate the IIGEP observation role with effect from April 1, 2008 and informed President Mahinda Rajapakse of their decision. In their concluding public statement, they outlined that they did not see that continued observation would change the situation, and that despite IIGEP drawing attention to defects in the workings of the Commission, their recommendations have been largely disregarded.

In an IIGEP press briefing on April 22, 2008, three members of the IIGEP clarified matters relating to their resignation. Sir Nigel Rodley characterized some of the communications to the IIGEP, including to its chairman as 'very disrespectful', and added that the latest AG response to the April 14th IIGEP public statements contained baseless allegations that the IIGEP were working according to a secret agenda in order to force UN Human Rights Monitoring onto Sri Lanka in defiance of Sri Lankas sovereignty. The IIGEP Chairman, P.N. Bhagwati, outlined that the allegations that the IIGEP did not understand the Sri Lankan legal system were irrelevant, as IIGEPs mandate calls for the group to comment on whether the proceedings conform to international standards, not Sri Lankan standards. Professor Yozo Yokota reminded the press corps that, contrary to government statements, the IIGEP is not a European group, but consists of experts from all over the world.

== Main findings ==
The main concerns of the IIGEP were:

- A lack of political will from the Government of Sri Lanka to support a search for the truth.
- A conflict of interest in the proceedings before the Commission, with officers from the Attorney General playing an inappropriate and impermissible role in the proceedings.
- Lack of effective victim and witness protection
- Lack of transparency and timeliness in the proceedings
- Lack of full cooperation by State bodies
- Lack of financial independence of the Commission

== Government response ==
The Government of Sri Lanka responded to the resignation of the members of the IIGEP both formally through a response drafted by the Attorney General, where the AG argues that the IIGEP cannot terminate its existence but merely resign, and that the President then can nominate new Eminent Persons to carry on the task.
