= Whitney Robson Harris =

American lawyer

- Born: August 12, 1912; Seattle, Washington, U.S.
- Died: April 21, 2010 (aged 97); Frontenac, Missouri, U.S.
- Education: University of Washington; University of California, Berkeley (LLB)
- Occupation: Attorney
- Known for: Prosecutor at the Nuremberg Trials

Whitney Robson Harris (August 12, 1912 – April 21, 2010) was an American attorney, and one of the last surviving prosecutors from the Nuremberg Trials.

== Early life and education ==
Harris was born in Seattle, Washington. His father was a car dealer. He attended the University of Washington and earned a law degree from the University of California, Berkeley. He later became a lawyer in the Navy at the rank of captain.

== Career ==
After the end of World War II, Harris was selected to be part of the legal team led by U.S. Supreme Court Justice Robert H. Jackson that began the prosecution of war criminals in Nuremberg, Germany. Harris led the team's case against Ernst Kaltenbrunner, the highest-ranking leader of the Nazi Security Police to face trial. He was successful in winning a conviction against Kaltenbrunner for war crimes and crimes against humanity. He was also responsible for interrogating Rudolf Franz Ferdinand Hoess, the former commander of the Auschwitz concentration camp. For his work in the Nuremberg trials, Harris was decorated with the Legion of Merit.

In February 2002, Washington University School of Law's "Institute for Global Legal Studies" was renamed to the Whitney R. Harris World Law Institute in honor and recognition of Harris' lifelong achievements in the field of international justice, and his support of legal education and research. He was a member of the Whitney R. Harris World Law Institute's International Council.

During an Experts' Meeting of The Crimes Against Humanity Initiative of the Institute in 2010 at the Brookings Institution, Harris made a plea just prior to his death to the legal experts, members of civil society and diplomats who were present. He stated. "Following the trials, the Genocide Convention was adopted in 1948, criminalizing the Nazis' attempt to exterminate European Jewry. The Geneva Conventions were elaborated in 1949, codifying the laws of war. But crimes against humanity- one of the most revolutionary and important elements of the Nuremberg Charter itself - were never set out in a treaty until the adoption of the International Criminal Court Statute in the summer of 1998. Practically speaking, what that means is that the words uttered after Nuremberg 'And never again' have but a hollow significance. My friends, this initiative of the Institute that bears my name is the first serious international effort to fill this gap, complete this work, and fulfill the Nuremberg legacy."

Harris spoke of the institutional evil of the Nazi regime in Germany during an interview in 2008: "Society lays the groundwork, and we develop in that society... We become part of that society, we're captivated by it, and we might do evil, too. It makes you wonder about where is the future of mankind - is evil going to triumph ultimately, or is good going to triumph? You have to find the good instincts that are in all of us."

Seeing environmental conservation as another important component in promoting good in the world, Harris was also a founding member of the Development Board of the International Center for Tropical Ecology at the University of Missouri-St. Louis. The center was renamed the Whitney R. Harris World Ecology Center after a significant donation in 2006.

== Personal life ==
Harris was married three times. His first wife was Gerda Harris of Hidden Hills, California. She died in 2012. He married his second wife, with whom he had a son, his only child, in 1964. They were married until her death, in 1999. Harris married his third wife in 2000. He died at his home from cancer in 2010.
