= Vineeta Gupta =

American human rights activist and philanthropist

- Born: India
- Education: Notre Dame University
- Occupations: Human rights activist, philanthropist, and former government medical officer
- Years active: 1990s–present
- Employer: Stop HIV/AIDS in India Initiative (SHAII)
- Known for: Founder of Stop HIV/AIDS in India Initiative (SHAII) and litigation in Vineeta Gupta v. State of Punjab
- Title: Executive Director
- Website: vineetagupta.com

Vineeta Gupta is an Indian-born American human rights activist and philanthropist. She is the founder and director of the Stop HIV/AIDS in India Initiative (SHAII).

== Early life and education ==
Gupta was born in India, where she earned a medical degree and law degree. Later, she attended Notre Dame University, where she graduated with a master's degree in international human rights law.

== Career ==
Gupta began her career as a government medical officer working in slums. During her career, she served as a medical services class officer in Punjab during the 1990s and worked for the People's Union for Civil Liberties, where she attempted to take a stand against corruption. In the case Vineeta Gupta vs. State of Punjab, she argued against the use of instruments of torture in CIA offices, interrogation centers and police stations in Punjab, and won. She was illegally detained in 2001 for opposing the closure of a hospital in Punjab. A human rights report by Amnesty International, documented the Punjab governments harassment of Gupta for challenging injustice.

Gupta founded the Stop HIV/AIDS in India Initiative (SHAII) to tackle the challenges posed by HIV/AIDS, tuberculosis, and malaria in India. Prior to founding SHAII, she was the secretary general of Insaaf International.

From 2020 to 2022, Gupta served as a secretariat director of the ACTION Global Health Advocacy. Prior to joining ACTION, she was the Director at the Global Health Advocacy Incubator.

In 2022, Gupta joined the Network for Public Health Law as an executive director.

Gupta helps develop accessible healthcare systems, affordable generic medications, with a particular emphasis on gender sensitivity. She is also known for her work opposing amendments to the Indian Patents Act that could restrict access to generic medicines.
