= Bruno Cotte =

French judge (born 1945)

Judge of the International Criminal Court
- In office 3 December 2007 – 31 May 2014
- Nominated by: France
- Appointed by: Assembly of States Parties

President of the Criminal Chamber of the French Court of Cassation
- In office 2000–2007

Counsel for the Prosecution of the French Court of Cassation
- In office 1995–2000

Public Prosecutor of the Tribunal de grande instance de Paris
- In office 1990–1995

Attorney General of the Versailles Court of Appeal
- In office May 1990 – September 1990

Director for Criminal Affairs and Pardons in the French Ministry of Justice
- In office 1984–1990

Personal details
- Born: 10 June 1945 Lyon, France

Bruno Cotte (born 10 June 1945 in Lyon) is a French jurist who served as a judge of the International Criminal Court (ICC) from 2007 to 2014.

Before his appointment to the ICC, Cotte was a member of the Cour de Cassation, France's supreme court of appeal. He had been Director for Criminal Affairs and Pardons in the French Ministry of Justice, Attorney General of the Versailles Court of Appeal and a public prosecutor of the Paris district court. He was elected to the ICC in 2008 to fill a judicial vacancy and was elected from the Western European and Others group of states. He was on the ICC's List A of judges, which comprises those judges who are experts in criminal law.
