= Mercedes Doretti =

Argentine anthropologist (born 1959)

- Born: 1959 (age 66–67); Buenos Aires, Argentina
- Education: National University of Buenos Aires
- Known for: finding evidence of crimes against humanity
- Awards: MacArthur Fellows Program
- Scientific career
- Fields: forensic anthropologist

Mercedes Doretti (born 1959) is an Argentine forensic anthropologist based in New York City. She is known for finding evidence of crimes against humanity. She was awarded a MacArthur "Genius Grant" prize in 2007.

== Life ==
Her mother is Magdalena Ruiz Guinazu, a radio journalist.

She helped found the Argentine Forensic Anthropology Team. In 1992, she opened the team's New York office and expanded her work globally.

She has lectured at University of California, Berkeley, Harvard University, Massachusetts Institute of Technology, Columbia University, State University of New York at Purchase, New School for Social Research, Rutgers University, Amnesty International, The Carter Center, and the World Archaeological Congress.

In 2016, Doretti was named to the BBC's annual list of 100 Women.

== Awards ==
- 2007 MacArthur Fellows Program
- 2016 Honorary Doctorate from The New School

== Works ==
- Mercedes Doretti; Jennifer Burrell (2007). "Gray Spaces and Endless Negotiations". In Les W. Field; Richard Gabriel Fox (eds.). Anthropology put to work. Berg Publishers. ISBN 978-1-84520-601-7.
- Bradley J. Adams; John E. Byrd, eds. (2008). "Commingled Remains and Human Rights Investigations". Recovery, Analysis, and Identification of Commingled Human Remains. Springer. ISBN 978-1-58829-769-3.

=== Film ===
- Following Antigone: Forensic Anthropology and Human Rights Investigations (EAAF Witness production 2002). Co-producer
