= Josef Silverstein =

American academic (1922–2021)

Josef Silverstein (15 May 1922 – 29 June 2021) was an American academic known for his critiques of Myanmar's military leadership and his scholarship on Southeast Asian studies.

== Early life and education ==
Born in Los Angeles, Silverstein was the middle child of Frank Silverstein, an Army-Navy store owner, and Betty (Heymanson) Silverstein, a sales associate.

Silverstein served in the merchant marine during World War II and the Korean War. He completed his bachelor's degree at the University of California, Los Angeles, in 1952, where he was elected to Phi Beta Kappa, and earned a Ph.D. in political science from Cornell University in 1960, specializing in Southeast Asia.

== Career ==
Silverstein began his academic career at Wesleyan University and later moved to Rutgers University, where he worked until his retirement as professor emeritus in 1992. Silverstein's fieldwork included a Fulbright Scholarship in Rangoon in 1955 and academic positions in Burma, Malaysia, and Singapore.

His major works include The Political Legacy of Aung San (1972), Burmese Politics: The Dilemma of National Unity (1980), and Burma: Military Rule and the Politics of Stagnation (1977). He was critical of Aung San Suu Kyi's political actions after her release from house arrest.

Silverstein's focus on democracy and human rights in Myanmar led to his exclusion from the country for much of his career. He often met with opposition groups along the borders with Thailand and China, advising on federalism and constitutional law.

== Bibliography ==
- The Political Legacy of Aung San (1972)
- Burma: Military Rule and the Politics of Stagnation (1977)
- Burmese Politics: The Dilemma of National Unity (1980)
- Independent Burma at Forty Years (1989)
