= International Science Programme =

The International Science Programme (ISP) is an independent unit at Uppsala University under the Faculty of Science and Technology, in Uppsala, Sweden.

== History ==
ISP was founded in 1961 by Professor Tor Ragnar Gerholm at the Uppsala University Institute of Physics as a scholarship program called The International Seminar in Physics. The program provided scholarships for physics researchers from academic institutions in low-income countries.

Today ISP supports research groups and scientific networks in low and lower-middle income countries in Africa, Asia and Latin America.

Since its inception in 1961, ISP has contributed to more than 1,000 PhD graduates and even more MSc graduates. Many of them have studied in their home country and in Sweden or other nations (the sandwich model).

A program in mathematics was added in 2002.
