= Siegfried Wiessner =

German law professor

- Education: Master of Laws (LL.M.); 1983 (Yale); Doctor of Law (Dr. iur.); 1989 (University of Tübingen)
- Occupations: Professor of Law and Founder & Director, Graduate Program in Intercultural Human Rights, St. Thomas University School of Law
- Organization(s): International Law Association; Committee on the Rights of Indigenous Peoples; Chair, 2008-2012; Nominated and Preceded by Professor S. James Anaya European University Institute; Florence, Italy; Fernand Braudel Senior Fellow, Fall 2009 City University of Hong Kong School of Law; Visiting Professor of Law; October 2009 & November 2010 The American Society of International Law; Executive Council; Member, 2007-2010 UN/UNITAR International Law Fellowship Program; Lecturer, 1997-2000
- Known for: ILA Resolution No. 5/2012 on the Rights of Indigenous Peoples
- Awards: Lawyers to the Rescue; Law Professor of the Year Award; March 14, 2013

Siegfried Wiessner (born 26 February 1953 in Germany) is a Professor of Law and the Founder and Director of St. Thomas University's Graduate Program in Intercultural Human Rights in Miami, Florida. He holds a law degree (1977) as well as a Dr. iur. (1989) from the University of Tübingen, Germany, and an LL.M. from Yale Law School (1982). In 1986, he was elected a member of the International Institute of Space Law. He is the Editor-in-Chief of Martinus Nijhoff's Studies in Intercultural Human Rights. From 1997 to 2000, he was a lecturer at the International Law Fellowship Program. In October 2009 and November 2010, he served as Visiting Professor of Law at the City University of Hong Kong. In fall 2009, he was a Fernand Braudel Senior Fellow at the European University Institute in Florence, Italy. From 2007 to 2010, he was a member of the Executive Council of The American Society of International Law. From 2008 to 2012, he served as the Chair of the International Law Association's Committee on the Rights of Indigenous Peoples.

Professor Wiessner teaches U.S. Constitutional Law and International Law. He has published widely in the fields of constitutional law, international law, human rights, international indigenous law, the law of armed conflict, arbitration, space law, and refugee law. In 1989, he published a book on the function of nationality, and he is the co-author, with Michael Reisman of Yale Law School, of a leading casebook on international law, International Law in Contemporary Perspective (2004). Throughout his life, Professor Wiessner has pushed the envelope in favor of social justice and the protection of the poor and marginalized. In Germany, as a young lawyer in 1980, he safeguarded the due process rights of asylum seekers through a novel interpretation of the country's constitution, which was, in essence, adopted by the country's Federal Constitutional Court. Coming to Yale Law School in 1982, he was immersed in that institution's distinctive problem-oriented approach to law, saw it as a liberation from the straitjacket of positivism, and redefined the role of the lawyer as leader and problem solver in society, a "doctor of the social order." By taking into account conflicting claims, past trends in decision and evaluating past decisions in light of a public order of human dignity, he suggests developing decisions best suited to maximize access by all to all things humans value. He applied this "New Haven Approach" to issues of mass atrocities as well as conflicts over the allocation of resources.

His main contribution to an order of human dignity worldwide has been, as of yet, his research on and subsequent development of the law regarding the rights and status of indigenous peoples. He first made the argument, laid out in the Harvard Human Rights Journal in 1999, that customary international law protects indigenous peoples' rights to land, their cultural traditions, and self-government. As Chair of the International Law Association's Committee on the Rights of Indigenous Peoples, he led 30 experts from around the globe to a thorough review of this position, culminating in the organization's emphatic approval of Resolution No. 5/2012 confirming those rights to their lands, culture, and autonomy at its meeting in Sofia, Bulgaria, in August 2012.

Another notable contribution is the establishment of the Graduate Program in Intercultural Human Rights in 2001. The program combines an LL.M. degree with a selective J.S.D. track that requires students to publish their theses. This structure has contributed to the recognition of St. Thomas at both local and international levels. Graduates of the program have pursued careers in human rights and related fields, working in various parts of the world.

As of the reported figure of 303 LL.M. graduates, many have engaged in legal and advocacy work focused on human dignity and social change. On March 14, 2013, Professor Wiessner received the Law Professor of the Year Award from the humanitarian organization Lawyers to the Rescue.

== Selected works ==
Die Funktion der Staatsangehörigkeit [The Function of Nationality] (Tübingen University Press, 1989), 414 pp.

International Law in Contemporary Perspective (Casebook, Foundation Press 2004), with W. Michael Reisman, Mahnoush Arsanjani, and Gayl Westerman,1584 pp.

Looking to the Future: Essays on International Law in Honor of W. Michael Reisman (Editor, with Mahnoush Arsanjani, Jacob Katz Cogan & Robert D. Sloane, Martinus Nijhoff Publishers, 2011), 1100 pp.

Asylverweigerung ohne Anerkennungsverfahren, 7 Europäische Grundrechte-Zeitschrift 473-479 (1980).

The Public Order of the Geostationary Orbit: Blueprints for the Future, 9 Yale J. World Pub. Order 217-274 (1983[1985]).

Rights and Status of Indigenous Peoples: A Global Comparative and International Legal Perspective, 12 Harv. Hum. Rts. J. 57-128 (1999).

Policy-Oriented Jurisprudence and Human Rights Abuses in Internal Conflict: Toward a World Public Order of Human Dignity, 93 Am. J. Int'l L. 316-334 (1999), with Andrew R. Willard.

The New Haven School: A Brief Introduction,32 Yale J. Int’l L. 575-582 (2007), with W. Michael Reisman and Andrew R. Willard.

The New Haven School of Jurisprudence: A Universal Toolkit for Understanding and Shaping the Law, 18 Asia Pacific L. Rev. 45-61 (2010).

The Cultural Rights of Indigenous Peoples: Achievements and Continuing Challenges, 22 Eur. J.Int’l L. 121-140 (2011).
