= Graciela Dixon =

Graciela Dixon is a Panamanian judge. She served as the first woman of African descent to be the president of the Supreme Court of Panama between 2006 and 2007. She is widely considered to be the first woman of African descent to hold that position.

Supreme Court magistrates in Panama serve fixed 10-year terms and elect, from among their peers, the Chief Justice, who serves for one two-year term. She was nominated by Panama, under the Rome Statute, to sit in the International Criminal Court in the Hague, however, this nomination was not successful.

Prior to becoming a Supreme Court justice, Dixon spent 22 years in private legal practice. She is a graduate of the University of Panama and the Universidad Católica Santa María La Antigua.

== See also ==
- List of Afro-Latinos
