= Daniel Nsereko =

Ugandan judge and legal scholar (born 1941)

- Born: Daniel David Ntanda Nsereko; 27 November 1941 (age 84)
- Other names: Judge and legal scholar

Academic background
- Education: University of East Africa; New York University School of Law; Howard University School of Law

Judge of the Special Tribunal for Lebanon
- Incumbent
- Assumed office 12 March 2012

Judge of the International Criminal Court
- In office 3 December 2007 – 10 March 2012
- Nominated by: Uganda
- Appointed by: Assembly of States Parties

Daniel David Ntanda Nsereko (born 27 November 1941) is a Ugandan judge and legal scholar. He was a member of the Appeals Chamber of the International Criminal Court (ICC) from 2008 to 2012, and currently serves as a judge on the Special Tribunal for Lebanon.

== Early life and education ==
Nsereko comes from a family of nine children. His father Obadiah Busulwa was a former teacher and lay preacher in the Anglican Church, until he became a Seventh-day Adventist in 1950. Nsereko was baptized into the Seventh-day Adventist Church in 1960, during secondary school.

Nsereko received his LLB from the University of East Africa in 1968, an MCJ from Howard University School of Law in 1970, and an LLM and JSD from New York University School of Law in 1973-1975.

He also obtained a Certificate in International Law in 1972 from The Hague Academy of International Law. He was the first person from his home village in Nabinene, Uganda, to graduate from university with his LL.B.. Since 1972, he has been an Advocate of the High Court of Uganda.

After completing his studies and returning to Uganda in the mid-1970s, the country was going through an unsettled and sometimes dangerous period under the Amin regime. Nsereko practiced law in Kampala, working on a variety of legal matters, including serving as the lawyer for the Seventh-day Adventist Church in the area, all while navigating a challenging political climate.

== Legal career ==
Private Practice and Advocacy

Nsereko began his career in Uganda as a pupil advocate with Kiwanuka & Co., Advocates, in 1968. He became an Advocate of the High Court of Uganda in 1972 and ran a full-time private law practice in Kampala from 1978 to 1982. In this role, he represented clients in both criminal and civil cases before various courts, sometimes achieving precedent-setting decisions. He later served as a consultant for the law firm of Ssendege, Senyondo & Co., Advocates and Solicitors, in Kampala.

International and Advisory Roles

Nsereko's international work included consulting for the United Nations Crime Branch, contributing to the drafting of the UN Declaration on the Rights of Victims of Crime and Abuse of Power. He also led Amnesty International missions to investigate human rights violations and served as a trial observer. He participated in the process leading to the establishment of the International Criminal Court (ICC) and provided legal opinions to the ICC Prosecutor and the International Criminal Tribunal for Rwanda (ICTR).

Judicial Service

Nsereko was nominated and elected to the ICC in 2007. In 2009, he presided over an appeal of a criminal case against Germain Katanga. In 2012, he was part of the majority panel in an ICC case regarding the 2007–2008 Kenyan crisis. He became a judge of the Special Tribunal for Lebanon in March 2012. He is currently a member of the Advisory Committee on nominations of judges to the ICC.

Nsereko is a member of the Crimes Against Humanity Initiative Advisory Council, a project of the Whitney R. Harris World Law Institute at Washington University School of Law in St. Louis to establish the world's first treaty on the prevention and punishment of crimes against humanity.

He has been a Professor of Law at the University of Botswana and Makerere University in Uganda. He has also served as an expert consultant to the United Nations Crime Branch and on several Amnesty International missions to investigate human rights violations.

He is a widely published author in the fields of international criminal law and human rights, with notable works including Criminal Law in Uganda and Constitutional Law in Botswana.

== Personal life ==
- Marital Status: He is married.
- Wife: He met his wife, Helen, who is a distinguished mathematician, while they were attending the same church congregation during his studies in New York.
- Children: As of the mid-1970s when he returned to Uganda, he was married with three children. Sources indicate that the couple has raised their family while he pursued his international career.
- His autobiography, To the Hague from Nabinene, highlights his journey from a very humble background to becoming an international judge, underscoring the values of hard work, education, and resilience.
- Interests: Beyond law, sources indicate he held a keen interest in Ugandan football and KCCA FC as a supporter. He is described as a humble, satisfied man who was content with what he had and never feared expressing his opinion.

== See also ==
- Solome Bossa
- Elizabeth Ibanda-Nahamya
- George Kanyeihamba
- Monica Mugenyi
- Joseph Mulenga
- Julia Sebutinde
