= Jiří Toman =

Czech-born Swiss jurist and professor (1938–2020)

- Born: 5 November 1938; Prague, Czechoslovakia
- Died: 20 April 2020 (aged 81); Geneva, Switzerland
- Occupation: Professor

Jiří Toman (5 November 1938 – 20 April 2020) was a Czech-born Swiss jurist and professor. He was an expert in the field of international law. From 1992 to 1998, he directed the Henry-Dunant Institute in Geneva, which he had joined in 1969. From 1998 to 2018, Toman was a professor at the Santa Clara University School of Law.

== Biography ==
Toman studied law at Charles University in Prague from 1956 to 1961, where he obtained a doctoral degree in 1966. He also studied at the Graduate Institute of International and Development Studies from 1965 to 1970, where he obtained a doctorate in political science in 1981. His thesis was on the Soviet Union and the law of armed conflict.

From 1969 to 1972, Toman was a research fellow at the Henry-Dunant Institute. He was a research director from 1972 to 1979, assistant director from 1979 to 1992, and director from 1992 to 1998. He was a consultant to several United Nations bodies in the 1980s, notably for UNESCO from 1983 to 1988.

Toman often taught at universities, teaching at several in Prague from 1962 to 1970. From 1977 to 1980, he was a lecturer at the University of Franche-Comté in Besançon, where he taught international humanitarian law. He was a visiting professor at the University of Santa Clara in California from 1982 to 1989, and at Georgetown University in 1984. He taught at the Santa Clara University School of Law from 1998 to 2018. He was then a visiting professor at Danube University Krems in Austria.

In 1995, Toman was one of twelve jurists selected by the United Nations Security Council and presented to the President of the United Nations General Assembly for the election of judges to the International Criminal Tribunal for Rwanda. Toman's research and teachings on international law focused on humanitarian rights and international organizations.

Jiří Toman died of COVID-19 in Geneva on 20 April 2020, at the age of 81.

== Distinctions ==
- Knight of Honor of the Order of Saint George (House of Habsburg)

== Publications ==
- Index of the Geneva Convention for the Protection of War Victims of 12 August 1949 (1973)
- The protection of cultural property in the event of armed conflict : commentary on the Convention for the Protection of Cultural Property in the Event of Armed Conflict and its Protocol, signed on 14 May 1954 in The Hague, and on other instruments of international law concerning such protection (1996)
- La Russie et la Croix-Rouge, 1917-1945 : la Croix-Rouge dans un état révolutionnaire et l'action du CICR en Russie après la Révolution d'octobre 1917 (1997)
- Les biens culturels en temps de guerre : quel progrès en faveur de leur protection ? Commentaire article-par-article du Deuxième Protocole de 1999 relatif à la Convention de La Haye de 1954 pour la protection des biens culturels en cas de conflit armé (2015)
