= Leila Nadya Sadat =

Professor of Law

Leila Nadya Sadat (born in Newark, New Jersey) is the James Carr Professor of International Criminal Law at Washington University School of Law and the former Director of the Whitney R. Harris World Law Institute. She has served as Special Advisor on Crimes Against Humanity to Chief Prosecutor Fatou Bensouda of the International Criminal Court since December 12, 2012. Sadat is the Director of The Crimes Against Humanity Initiative, a multi-year project to study the problem of crimes against humanity and draft a comprehensive convention addressing their punishment and prevention. She has spearheaded the international effort to establish this new global convention. In 2012 Sadat was elected to membership in the U.S. Council on Foreign Relations, and in 2018 was elected as the President of the American Branch of the International Law Association for a two-year term in October 2018.

== Education ==
Sadat received her B.A. from Douglass College, her J.D. from Tulane University Law School (summa cum laude) and holds graduate degrees from Columbia Law School (LLM, summa cum laude) and the University of Paris I – Sorbonne (diplôme d'études approfondies). She is bilingual in French and English.

== Career ==
As a scholar, teacher, and author, Sadat has contributed to the establishment and study of the International Criminal Court (ICC). She was a delegate to the U.N. Preparatory Committee and to the 1998 Diplomatic Conference in Rome which established the ICC, represented the government of Timor-Leste at the 8th Session of the Assembly of States Parties to the Rome Statute of the ICC, and served as a delegate for the International Law Association, American Branch at the 2010 ICC Review Conference in Kampala, Uganda.

Sadat is known for her work in Public International Law and human rights. More recently, she has been invited to write on topics ranging from the U.S. use of drones, the legal categorization of the conflict in Syria, the U.S. war on terror and its classification of others as "unlawful enemy combatants," "Global Trumpism," the use of force, and the law of crimes against humanity.

From 2001-2003 she served as a Commissioner on the U.S. Commission on International Religious Freedom. She was nominated by then Minority Leader Richard A. Gephardt and appointed by Congress. The nine-member Commission was established by the International Religious Freedom Act of 1998 to advise the President and the Department of State on Issues of International Religious Freedom, both generally and with regard to particular countries.

Sadat is the current President of the International Law Association (American Branch), Vice-President of the International Association of Penal Law (AIDP), and is a member of the American Law Institute and the Council on Foreign Relations. She has also served as a member of the Executive Council, Executive Committee, Program Committee and Awards Committee for the American Society of International Law and held leadership roles in the American Society of Comparative Law, including serving as the Book Review Editor for the American Journal of Comparative Law.

Prior to entering law teaching, Sadat practiced law for five years in Paris, France, and clerked for Judge Albert Tate Jr. in the United States Court of Appeals for the Fifth Circuit. She was also a stagiaire at the Cour de Cassation and Conseil d'Etat.

Sadat has published more than 100 articles, essays, and books. She also has written many op-eds and is a regular contributor on ASIL Blog and Intlawgrrls Blog. She also authors the blog Windows on the World and contributes to the blog Lex lata, lex ferenda.

=== Work on Crimes Against Humanity ===
Sadat is widely considered one of the leading international legal experts' on crimes against humanity. Her first peer-review paper, which determined if she would get tenure, has become the definitive source on the case of Paul Touvier, a Nazi collaborator in Occupied France during World War II who, in 1994, became the first Frenchman to be convicted of crimes against humanity. She is the Chairwoman of the Steering Committee of The Crimes Against Humanity Initiative, the first concerted effort to address the gap that exists in international criminal law by enumerating a comprehensive international convention on crimes against humanity. In this role she spearheaded the drafting of the Proposed International Convention on the Prevention and Punishment of Crimes Against Humanity as her role as director of the Crimes Against Humanity Initiative, a project that moved the UN International Law Commission to begin its own project with a view towards the development of a new UN convention on crimes against humanity.

She has lectured widely on this topic, advocating for civil society and state governments to support a new global treaty, including at Misericordia University, Wayne State University Law School, John Burroughs High School, the School of Human Rights Research in the Netherlands, the 2013 NAFSA Annual Conference & Expo in St. Louis, The American Foreign Law Association in New York, Indiana University and University of Minnesota Law School. In April 2015, Leila Sadat presented on the Crimes Against Humanity Initiative at the Universidade Católica Portuguesa. The presentation was attended by the President of the Portuguese Supreme Court, Justice António Henriques Gaspar, Justice Maria dos Prazeres Beleza, also from the Supreme Court of Justice, and Portugal's then-Attorney General Joana Marques Vidal. Prominent members of the Academy were also present, including the Dean of the Lisbon School of Law of the Universidade Católica Portuguesa, Professor Jorge Pereira da Silva, Professor Germano Marques da Silva, a former Dean of Lisbon School of Law, Professor Luís Barreto Xavier, the Dean of Católica Global School of Law and Professor Gonçalo Matias, Director of Católica Global's Transnational Law Program, and special adviser to Portuguese President Aníbal Cavaco Silva.

== Books ==
- International Law: Cases and Commentary (6th edn, forthcoming) (Leila Nadya Sadat, with Mark Weston Janis and John E. Noyes)
- Seeking Accountability for the Unlawful Use of Force (Leila Nadya Sadat, ed., Cambridge, 2018)
- The Founders(David M. Crane, Leila Nadya Sadat and Michael P. Scharf, eds, Cambridge, 2018)
- Forging a Convention for Crimes Against Humanity (Leila Nadya Sadat, ed., Cambridge 2011)
- The Theory and Practice of International Criminal Law: Essays in Honor of M. Cherif Bassiouni (Leila N. Sadat, Michael P. Scharf, eds., Martinus Nijhoff 2008)
- International Criminal Law: Cases and Materials (3rd ed., Carolina, 2006) (with Bassiouni, Paust, et al.)
- The International Criminal Court and the Transformation of International Law: Justice for the New Millennium (Transnational, 2002)
- International Criminal Law: Cases and Materials (2nd ed., Carolina, 2000) (with Bassiouni, Paust, et al.)
- Model Draft Statute for the International Criminal Court Based on the Preparatory Committee's Text to the Diplomatic Conference, Rome, June 15-July 17, 1998, 13ter Nouvelles Études Pénales (Leila Sadat Wexler, special ed. 1998)
