= Fumiko Saiga =

Japanese diplomat

- 齋賀 富美子

Judge of the International Criminal Court
- In office November 30, 2007 – April 24, 2009
- Nominated by: Japan
- Appointed by: Assembly of States Parties
- Preceded by: Claude Jorda

Lieutenant Governor of Saitama Prefecture
- In office 1998–2000

Personal details
- Born: November 30, 1943 Marugame, Japan
- Died: April 24, 2009 (aged 65) The Hague, Netherlands

Fumiko Saiga (齋賀 富美子, Saiga Fumiko; November 30, 1943 – April 24, 2009) was a Japanese diplomat and was the first Japanese person and Asian woman to serve as a judge on the International Criminal Court. Her work focused on human rights and gender equality. As a politician, she was the Lieutenant Governor of Saitama Prefecture from 1998-2000.

== Early life and education ==
Saiga was born in Marugame, Kagawa, Japan on November 30, 1943. She graduated with a bachelor's degree from the Tokyo University of Foreign Studies in 1966.

== Career ==
Saiga entered the Ministry of Foreign Affairs immediately after graduation. Much of her early career was in Japan, culminating in 1998 when she was elected to serve as the Lieutenant Governor of Saitama prefecture. In 2000, Saiga became the Consul General at the Japanese Consulate in Seattle. She also worked as the ambassador to Norway and Iceland.

Saiga's work mainly related to human rights. In 2001, she joined the Convention on the Elimination of All Forms of Discrimination Against Women. She also advocated for Japanese citizens who were kidnapped by North Korea.

Saiga was elected to the International Criminal Court in November 2007 and was sworn in in January 2008. She was the first Asian woman to be elected to the court, and the first person from Japan. During her tenure on the court she oversaw the investigation of war crimes in the Democratic Republic of Congo. Though she did not have formal legal training and a limited knowledge of international law, she obtained 2/3 of the votes necessary to be elected to the position. After her sudden death in the Hague on April 24, 2009, the nomination process was changed, and an independent panel reviews all nominations before the election.

She was awarded the Order of the Sacred Treasure.
