= Stephen P. Marks =

American scientist

- Education: Law and International Relations (Stanford University, France, Syrian Arab Republic)
- Occupations: professor, dean, author
- Employer: O.P. Jindal Global University
- Awards: Honorary Fellow, AAAS

Stephen P. Marks is an American scientist who is currently the François-Xavier Bagnoud Professor Emeritus of Health and Human Rights at Harvard T.H. Chan School of Public Health. He is the founding dean of the Jindal School of Public Health and Human Development (JSPH) at O.P. Jindal Global University, India.

== Academia ==
Marks has had an extensive academic career. He served as the François-Xavier Bagnoud Professor of Health and Human Rights at Harvard T.H. Chan School of Public Health from 1999 to 2022. He was also the director of the François-Xavier Bagnoud Center for Health and Human Rights and the Program on Human Rights in Development.

In 2022, he became the founding dean of the Jindal School of Public Health and Human Development at O.P. Jindal Global University, where he currently teaches and leads the institution.

== Awards and honors ==
- Honorary Fellow of the American Association for the Advancement of Science (AAAS) in 2019
- Arjun K. Sengupta Memorial Lecturer award at Jindal Global University in 2013
- Mentoring Award from the Harvard School of Public Health
- Jeremy Knowles Scholar award from Harvard University
