= Crimes Against Humanity Initiative =

International law research project on crimes against humanity

- Established: 2008
- Affiliations: Whitney R. Harris World Law Institute
- Location: St. Louis, Missouri
- Website: sites.wustl.edu/crimesagainsthumanity/

The Crimes Against Humanity Initiative is a rule of law research and advocacy project of the Whitney R. Harris World Law Institute. Started in 2008 by Leila Nadya Sadat, the Initiative has as its goals the study of the need for a comprehensive international convention on the prevention and punishment of crimes against humanity, the analysis of the necessary elements of such a convention, and the drafting of a proposed treaty. To date, the Initiative has held several experts' meetings and conferences, published a Proposed Convention on the Prevention and Punishment of Crimes Against Humanity, and resulted in the publication of an edited volume, Forging a Convention for Crimes Against Humanity, by Cambridge University Press. The draft treaty is now available in seven languages. The UN International Law Commission produced its own, similar, set of Draft Articles on the Prevention and Punishment of Crimes against Humanity, and a proposed treaty is now being debated by governments around the world.

== Background on the need for a treaty on Crimes Against Humanity ==
Crimes against humanity, along with crimes against peace and war crimes, were one of the three categories of crimes elaborated upon in the Nuremberg Charter, in response to the grave atrocities committed during the Second World War. Since the establishment of the Nuremberg principles and the adoption of the Genocide Convention, genocide and war crimes have widely been recognized and prohibited in international criminal law. However, there has never been a comprehensive convention on crimes against humanity, even though such crimes are continuously perpetrated worldwide in numerous conflicts and crises. Consequently, an international convention on crimes against humanity is a key missing element in the current framework of international humanitarian law, international criminal law, and human rights law.

Washington University's Crimes Against Humanity (CAH) Initiative represents the first concerted effort to address the gap that exists in international criminal law by enumerating a comprehensive international convention on crimes against humanity. While the Genocide Convention provides a legal framework for prosecuting perpetrators of genocide, and the Geneva Conventions address war crimes, crimes against humanity have yet to be codified. The statutes of the International Criminal Court, the International Criminal Tribunals for the Former Yugoslavia and for Rwanda each contain different definitions of crimes against humanity, further demonstrating the need for a comprehensive convention that would both punish perpetrators and prevent such atrocities from occurring in the future.

== Leadership ==
The Crimes Against Humanity Initiative is directed by a global Steering Committee of experts and scholars in the field of international criminal law which includes:

- Professor Leila Nadya Sadat (chairwoman),
- Professor M. Cherif Bassiouni, (in memoriam)
- Ambassador Hans Corell,
- Justice Richard Goldstone,
- Professor Juan E. Méndez,
- Professor William Schabas and
- Judge Christine Van Den Wyngaert.

The Crimes Against Humanity Initiative also has a global advisory counsel composed of high-ranking international law and human rights practitioners and scholars from around the world, including Human Rights Policy Fellow at Harvard Law Federica D’Alessandra, Professor Payam Akhavan of McGill University, and Judge Silvia Fernández de Gurmendi, former president of the International Criminal Court and present Central and South American Judge to the ICC.

== Past work ==
The Crimes Against Humanity Initiative has three primary objectives: (1) to study the law and sociological reality as regards the commission of crimes against humanity; (2) to combat the indifference and the negative legal consequences emergent from the idea that crimes against humanity are less serious than genocide; and (3) to address the gap in the law by elaborating the first-ever comprehensive specialized convention on crimes against humanity. The CAH Initiative is carried out in five phases, four of which have been completed. The first phase was to prepare the project in various aspects, including its methodological development.

=== Phase two ===
The second phase was to conduct a private study through the writing of papers and expert collaboration. This phase resulted in the production of scholarly papers which contribute to the body of literature on crimes against humanity. Fifteen of these papers, written by leading experts, were presented and discussed at a conference held at Washington University School of Law in St. Louis on April 13–14, 2009. The April Experts' Meeting was the first formal session of the Initiative and was attended by more than forty international experts and academics. This Meeting resulted in a report, which summarized and addressed concerned raised by participants, including the relationship between a crimes against humanity convention and the International Criminal Court, universal jurisdiction, and the relationship to customary international law.

=== Phase three ===
The third phase of the Initiative resulted in the elaboration and publication of a Proposed International Convention on the Prevention and Punishment of Crimes Against Humanity in English and French. Nearly 250 experts were consulted and the draft of the Proposed Convention underwent seven major revisions.

A Capstone Conference was held in Washington D.C. at the Brookings Institution in 2010. This Conference was co-sponsored by the American Society of International Law, the American National Section of the International Association of Penal Law, and the Brookings Institution. This Conference resulted in a Declaration on the Need for a Comprehensive Convention on Crimes Against Humanity which was signed by all seven members of the Steering Committee and supported by 73 other individuals who were involved in the process, including Ambassador David Scheffer, Silvana Arbia, then Registrar of the ICC, Robert Badinter, David M. Crane, former Prosecutor at the Special Court for Sierra Leone, Benjamin B. Ferencz, a chief prosecutor at the United States Military Tribunals in Nuremberg, Judge O-Gon Kwon, International Criminal Tribunal for the former Yugoslavia, Judge Daniel Nsereko, International Criminal Court and H.E. Gareth John Evans.

An Experts' Meeting was held in Geneva May 16–17, 2014 at the Villa Moynier. This meeting included international legal experts, governmental officials, diplomats, members of civil society, and many members of the International Law Commission. These discussions are summarized in a Report published on July 17, 2014.

In March 2011, Cambridge University Press published Forging a Convention for Crimes Against Humanity, an edited volume on the work of the Initiative, which contains the text of the Proposed Convention in French and English, a comprehensive history of its drafting, and fifteen expert commentaries from the Expert's Meeting in April 2009. The book received considerable praise and attention, including being awarded the Book of the Year Award by the Association Internationale de Droit Pénal (American Branch). A second edition, with the text of the convention in Spanish and Arabic, was later published.

=== Proposed Convention on the Prevention and Punishment of Crimes Against Humanity ===
The Proposed Convention on the Prevention and Punishment of Crimes Against Humanity is a model treaty developed by the Crimes Against Humanity initiative. It contains 27 articles and 6 annexes. Echoing its 1907 forebear, it also contains its own "Martens Clause" in the Preamble. The Proposed Convention builds upon and complements the ICC Statute by retaining the Rome Statute definition of crimes against humanity, but has added robust interstate cooperation, extradition, and mutual legal assistance provisions in Annexes 2-6. Universal jurisdiction was retained (but is not mandatory), and the Rome Statute served as a model for several additional provisions, including Articles 4-7 (Responsibility, Official Capacity, Non-Application of Statute of Limitations) and with respect to final clauses. Other provisions draw on international criminal law and human rights instruments more broadly, including the Enforced Disappearance Convention, the Terrorist Bombings Convention, the Convention Against Torture, the UN Conventions on Corruption and Organized Crime, the European Transfer of Proceedings Convention, and the Inter-American Criminal Sentences Convention. The Proposed Convention provides for State as well as individual responsibility, and would vest jurisdiction in the International Court of Justice to resolve differences as to interpretation and application of the Proposed Convention.

=== Phase four ===
The fourth phase included the promotion of the Proposed Convention as part of a broader global awareness campaign and assistance to the U.N. International Law Commission's work on drafting articles on crimes against humanity. In this phase, the Crimes Against Humanity Initiative aimed to raise global awareness of the need for an international convention on crimes against humanity, and to encourage the international community to adopt the Proposed Convention. The CAH Initiative has completed translations of the Proposed Convention in French, Spanish, Arabic, Russian, German, Chinese, and Portuguese, in order to widen the reach of the Initiative and the Proposed Convention.

The Crimes Against Humanity Initiative Steering Committee has also reached out to national and international policy makers to begin a dialog about the strengths and benefits of the Proposed Convention and the responsibility of the international community to prevent and punish crimes against humanity. Members of the Steering Committee frequently present the Initiative to audiences in the United States and abroad.

==== Global workshops and presentations ====
During this fourth phase, the Institute hosted or co-sponsored several workshops and events to raise awareness about the need for a global crimes against humanity treaty and encourage civil society actors around the globe to submit comments and recommendations to the International Law Commission. In 2016, the Asia-Pacific Workshop on a Global Convention for Crimes Against Humanity, was held over a two-day workshop at the National University of Singapore. In 2018, the Institute co-organized Latin America and the Caribbean Regional Workshop on Crimes Against Humanity in Lima, Peru, and the City University of New York School of Law (CUNY), together with MADRE, discussed the Draft Articles with a focus on women's rights and gender persecution. In 2019, the Konrad Adenauer Foundation in cooperation with the Human Sciences Research Council held a policy seminar in Johannesburg, South Africa entitled “Forging a Convention on Crimes Against Humanity,” led by Professor Sadat. In February 2019, a Discussion on the Draft Articles on Crimes Against Humanity was held at the Palais des Nations, supported the War Crimes Committee of the International Bar Association, the Harris Institute, the Permanent Mission of the Kingdom of the Netherlands and the Permanent Mission of the Principality of Lichtenstein. The Harris Institute has also held meetings on the topic as side events at the International Criminal Court's Assembly of States Parties, including at the 11th Session of in The Hague in November 2012, with the Governments of Germany and Korea at the Fifteenth Session in The Hague in November 2016, and with the Republic of Chile, Federal Republic of Germany, Hashemite Kingdom of Jordan, Republic of Korea, and Republic of Sierra Leone at the Sixteenth Session in New York City in December 2017.

Chairwoman Leila Nadya Sadat has presented on the Crimes Against Humanity Initiative at Misericordia University, Wayne Law School, John Burroughs High School the School of Human Rights Research in the Netherlands, the 2013 NAFSA Annual Conference & Expo in St. Louis, The American Foreign Law Association in New York, Indiana University and University of Minnesota Law School. In April 2015, Leila Sadat presented on the Crimes Against Humanity Initiative at the Universidade Católica Portuguesa. The presentation was attended by the President of the Portuguese Supreme Court, Justice António Henriques Gaspar, Justice Maria dos Prazeres Beleza, also from the Supreme Court of Justice and Portugal's Attorney General Joana Marques Vidal. Prominent members of the Academy were also present, including the Dean of the Lisbon School of Law of the Universidade Católica Portuguesa, Professor Jorge Pereira da Silva, Professor Germano Marques da Silva, a former Dean of Lisbon School of Law and a Criminal Law Professor, Professor Luís Barreto Xavier, the Dean of Católica Global School of Law and Professor Gonçalo Matias, Director of Católica Global's Transnational Law Program, and special adviser to Portuguese President Aníbal Cavaco Silva. Steering Committee member Cherif Bassiouni was interviewed by The Economist on the need for a global crimes against humanity treaty.

=== Never Again: Forging a Convention on Crimes Against Humanity documentary ===
The Institute produced a 45-minute documentary film entitled Never Again: Forging a Convention for Crimes Against Humanity, which was featured in the 2017 St. Louis International Film Festival's Human Rights Spotlight, was selected for the New Haven International Film Festival, the Belfast Respect Human Rights Film Festival, and the Tryon International Film Festival. The film has also been screened at numerous academic conferences and by civil society groups. The film is accompanied by an educational discussion guide. It has been shown at numerous high schools, universities, and at events hosted by civil society around the world.

=== Supporting the work of the International Law Commission ===
On July 30, 2013, the International Law Commission voted to include the topic of crimes against humanity in its long-term program of work. In July 2014, the Commission moved this topic to its active programme of work. Professor Sean Murphy, the United States' Member on the United Nations' International Law Commission, has been named the Special Rapporteur for Crimes Against Humanity. Sean Murphy attended the 2010 and 2014 Experts' Meeting held by the Initiative prior to this appointment. Murphy submitted his first report in 2015, outlining the general themes and scope of the project and proposing initial articles, leading to the adoption of Draft Articles 1-4 by the International Law Commission. The Special Rapporteur submitted his second report in 2016, and his third in 2017, creating Draft Articles 6-15 and draft annex with commentary, concluding the First Reading of the Draft Articles.

States, International Organizations, individuals and members of civil society were invited to submit comments on the First Reading. The CAH Initiative Steering Committee submitted its comments in November 2018.

A Fourth Report was completed in February 2019. Readings of the proposed Articles continued into 2019, with the International Law Commission conducting their second reading in May 2019. The Institute also co-hosted, with the War Crimes Committee of the International Bar Association, the Permanent Mission of the Kingdom of the Netherlands, and the Permanent Mission of the Principality of Lichtenstein, a Discussion on the Draft Articles on Crimes Against Humanity at the Palais des Nations in Geneva, Switzerland, while the International Law Commission was completing its second reading on the Draft Articles in May 2019. The ILC unanimously voted to send the Draft Articles to the Drafting Committee following a week of discussion, with the Commission adopting a complete set of 16 Draft Articles and full commentary at the end of the August 2019, recommending to the General Assembly "the elaboration of a convention by the General Assembly or by an international conference of plenipotentiaries on the basis of the draft articles."

== Current work ==
The Crimes Against Humanity Initiative has entered its fifth and final phase, centered on raising support for the formal adoption of the proposed treaty among the international community.

The U.N.'s Sixth Committee continued the work of the ILC in October 2019, debating the need for a Crimes Against Humanity Treaty, using the ILC's Draft Articles as a basis for consideration. The Harris Institute hosted with Germany, Chile, and Korea a side-meeting in New York City on the need for such a convention on October 29, 2019. The event was attended by more than 100 delegates, country representatives, members of civil society, and members of the International Law Commission. At the Sixth Committee, response to the International Law Commission's work was generally positive. Delegates from several states including The Netherlands, Argentina, Italy, and Ireland, among others, endorsed the current proposed convention, with Austria and Belarus calling for a diplomatic conference in Vienna to adopt the proposed convention.

On November 10, 2019, the U.N. Sixth Committee adopted Draft Resolution II on Crimes against Humanity which took note of the International Law Commission's Draft Articles and decided "to include in the provisional agenda of its seventy-fifth session an item entitled 'Crimes against humanity' and to continue to examine the recommendation of the Commission." Forty-two states joined a statement from Austria "regret[ing]... that the Sixth Committee was not able to agree on an ambitious and structured approach for ... future deliberations on the recommendation of the ILC to elaborate a convention on the basis of its draft articles."

In Resolution 187 of December 18, 2019, the General Assembly expressed appreciation to the International Law Commission for its continuing contribution to the codification and progressive development of international law and also took note of the draft articles on crimes against humanity.

The U.N. Sixth Committee pledged to re-visit the topic of crimes against humanity in October 2020.

== Responses to the initiative and Proposed Convention ==
=== Positive responses ===
The Proposed Convention and the Initiative has received support from a number of practitioners and scholars in the field of international criminal. For example, the Prosecutors of various international criminal tribunals have endorsed the goal of a convention on crimes against humanity in the declarations adopted in Chautauqua, New York, in 2010 and in Kigali, Rwanda, in 2009. The flagship book by the Initiative, Forging a Convention for Crimes Against Humanity, has received considerable praise and attention and received the Book of the Year Award from the American Branch of L'Association Internationale de Droit Pénal.

Additionally, the work of the Initiative was cited by the International Law Commission in its report detailing its decision to add the topic "Crimes against humanity" to its long-term programme of work.

Following Sean Murphy's report to the International Law Commission urging it to take up the topic of crimes against humanity, George Washington Law School enacted a new student project to search and develop commentary based on the Harris Institute's proposed convention.

In the 69th Session of the UN General Assembly in 2014, many states made positive remarks on the International Law Commission's decision to move forward with studying the need for a global crimes against humanity treaty, and expressed their support for the work of the ILC on the crimes against humanity treaty topic, including Australia, Croatia, the Czech Republic, Israel, Japan, Korea, Trinidad and Tobago, and the United States. In particular, Croatia stated that it "fully supports endeavors aimed at developing a global international instrument for the prevention, prosecution and punishment of crimes against humanity, as well as cooperation between States in that regard." The Czech Republic expressly noted the work of the Crimes Against Humanity Initiative in this area in their statements.

In the 70th Session of the UN General Assembly in 2015, Austria expressed support for the Draft Articles and continued extension of the convention and Croatia endorsed "all efforts aimed at developing a global international instrument for the prevention, prosecution and punishment of crimes against humanity." Chile, China, Germany, Indonesia, and Slovakia were among several states also expressing their support for the project.

In its 71st Session in 2016, Croatia and Germany continued their firm support for the work of the Special Rapporteur. Hungary agreed with the International Law Commission's notion to create further draft articles with the intention of forming a full convention. Australia, Belarus, Egypt, Iceland, Mexico, Switzerland, and Viet Nam also offered statements of agreement with the project to date.

Czech Republic during the UN General Assembly's 72nd Session in 2017 stated their strong support for the continued work towards a crimes against humanity convention, as did Israel and Italy. Argentina, Bulgaria, Ireland, Jordan, Mozambique, Poland, and Ukraine also expressed support after the completion of the first reading of the complete set of draft articles.

In the 73rd Session of the UN General Assembly in 2018, the "responsibility to protect and the prevention of ... crimes against humanity" from all states was reiterated. The Holy See encouraged "the continued efforts by the Committee to develop a new global convention," and Sierra Leone supported the continued inclusion of crimes against humanity in the ILC initiative.

In its 74th Session in 2019, several states continued with their positive stances concerning the International Law Commission's crimes against humanity project. Of 56 states and entities commenting, a majority made positive remarks including Austria, Brazil, Bulgaria, Chile, Estonia, Germany, Paraguay, Portugal, and Sierra Leone. Estonia noted the "outstanding contribution" by the Special Rapporteur and commended the intended inclusion of crimes against humanity as a peremptory norm of international law (jus cogens).

Whitney Robson Harris supported the work of the Initiative prior to his death. In 2010 he made a plea to the legal experts, members of civil society and diplomats who were present at the 2010 Experts' Meeting at the Brookings Institution. He stated,

Following the trials, the Genocide Convention was adopted in 1948, criminalizing the Nazis' attempt to exterminate European Jewry. The Geneva Conventions were elaborated in 1949, codifying the laws of war. But crimes against humanity – one of the most revolutionary and important elements of the Nuremberg Charter itself – were never set out in a treaty until the adoption of the International Criminal Court Statute in the summer of 1998. Practically speaking, what that means is that the words uttered after Nuremberg "And never again" have but a hollow significance. My friends, this initiative of the Institute that bears my name is the first serious international effort to fill this gap, complete this work, and fulfill the Nuremberg legacy.

=== Negative responses and criticisms ===
In the 69th Session of the UN General Assembly in 2014, some states questioned the need for further study on the need for a crimes against humanity convention, including France, South Africa, and the Netherlands, which considered "that this issue is to a large extent already addressed in the Rome Statute." France questioned the need for a crimes against humanity convention and made reference to the Crimes Against Humanity Initiative in their remarks before the UN 6th Committee in 2014.

Other scholars question the likelihood that the Proposed Convention will have any effect on the prevention and punishment of crimes against humanity.

In the 70th Session, Iran was of the view a new crimes against humanity convention was "premature" and its existence as an international crime was already concretely defined. Greece echoed this remark, believing the Rome Statute of the International Criminal Court to provide a "sufficient legal basis for the domestic criminalization and prosecution of crimes against humanity" already.

During the 71st Session, India gave similar comments regarding the International Criminal Court and its capacity to "deal with the subject matter of [crimes against humanity]," without the need for a new convention.

Iran during the 72nd Session in 2017 maintained its prior stance and were "not convinced [...] by the idea of a new convention on crimes against humanity." Sudan critiqued the project for not waiting for the International Law Commission's completion of the Draft Code of Offences against the Peace and Security of Mankind, and deriving a definition for crimes against humanity from this rather than creating a new international instrument.

In the 74th Session of the UN General Assembly in 2019, Israel stated its concern that "enforcement and jurisdiction mechanisms could be potentially abused by States and other actors," and the United States and Sudan argued the proposed convention lacks definitional clarity.

== See also ==
- Ideocracy
- International law
- Power politics
- Power Politics (Wight book)
- State collapse
