= Dinah Shelton =

American lawyer and IACHR commissioner

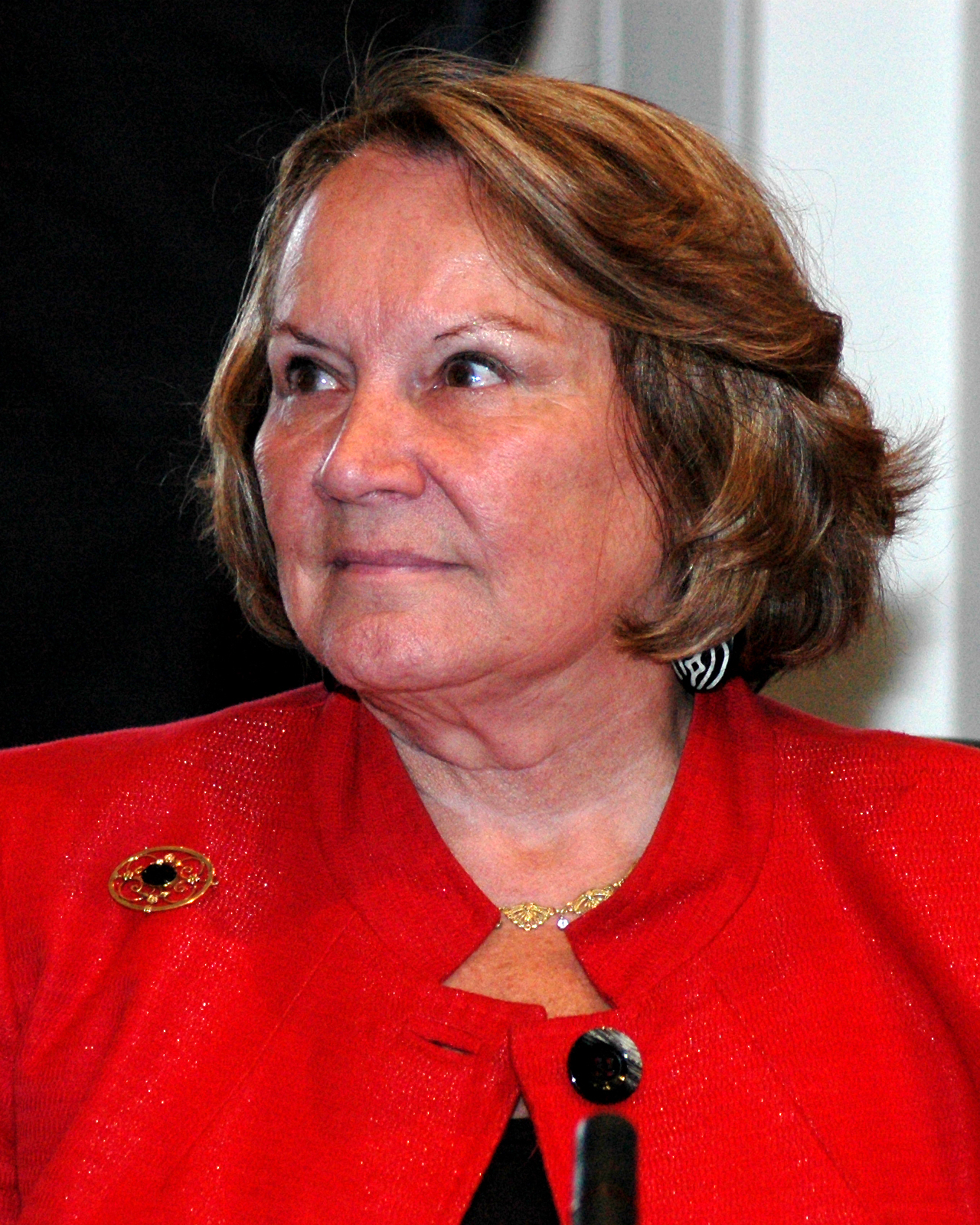
Dinah Shelton in 2010

Dinah Shelton is an American lawyer. She has been a university professor and served as commissioner for the Inter-American Commission on Human Rights between 2010 and 2013.

== Education ==
Shelton studied law at the University of California, Berkeley, as well as at the University of Edinburgh, in the United Kingdom.

== Career ==
She has worked as an international law consultant for the World Health Organization, the United Nations Environment Programme, the Food and Agriculture Organization (FAO), the United Nations Institute for Training and Research, and the European Council, among other international organizations. Shelton was also the director the Office of Staff Attorneys at the United States Court of Appeals of the Ninth Circuit and, at the International Institute of Human Rights, Director of Studies.

Shelton was elected as commissioner for the Inter-American Commission on Human Rights in June 2009 for a four-year term, starting on 1 January 2010.

She is a professor emeritus of International Law at the George Washington University Law School, has been a law professor at the University of Notre Dame Law School, and a visiting professor at several universities both in the United States and France.

She has written, co-written, or edited at least nineteen books, as well as authored dozens of book chapters and articles, about human rights and international law.

== Bibliography ==
- —————, ed. (2005). Encyclopedia of Genocide and Crimes Against Humanity. Macmillan Reference.
