= Whitney R. Harris World Law Institute =

- Established: 2000
- Director: Leila Nadya Sadat
- Location: St. Louis, Missouri
- Website: Official website

The Whitney R. Harris World Law Institute at Washington University School of Law was established in 2000 as the Institute for Global Legal Studies. It serves as a center for instruction and research in international and comparative law.

== Background ==
The Harris Institute was established in November 2000 as the "Institute for Global Legal Studies" and was later renamed as the "Whitney R. Harris Institute for Global Legal Studies" in honor and recognition of Whitney R. Harris' lifelong achievements in the field of international justice. Whitney R. Harris served as a trial counsel prosecuting the major German war criminals before the International Military Tribunal at Nuremberg in 1945 and he kept the Nuremberg dream alive through his writings and his advocacy, and later through his philanthropic support of legal education and research. In 2008, he and Anna Harris endowed the Institute's "World Peace Through Law Award" at a ceremony during which the Harris Institute's name was changed to the "Whitney R. Harris World Law Institute".

The Harris Institute has sponsored more than 125 speakers and held or co-sponsored more than 70 conferences, workshops, and experts' meetings and more than 120 lectures since it opened. Its work has also led to the publication of at least 6 books and 15 law review volumes. Primary projects led by the Harris Institute include the Crimes Against Humanity Initiative, the Gun Violence and Human Rights Project, the annual Arbitration and Dispute Resolution Symposium, as well as numerous opportunities for students to get experience in the field of international law. It also houses an "Ambassador-in-Residence" program and hosts debates and scholarship roundtables on pressing issues in international law and policy.

== Crimes Against Humanity Initiative ==
In 2008, the Whitney R. Harris World Law Institute launched Crimes Against Humanity Initiative to study the need for a comprehensive international convention on the prevention and punishment of crimes against humanity, analyze the necessary elements of such a convention, and draft a proposed treaty. The Initiative helped inspire the United Nations International Law Commission to pick up this topic, with a view towards drafting a UN treaty on Crimes Against Humanity. As of 2020, a set of Draft Articles on the Prevention and Punishment of Crimes against Humanity is being considered by the United Nations General Assembly Sixth Committee.

== Gun Violence and Human Rights Project ==
In the fall of 2017, the Institute launched a new initiative on gun violence examining U.S. government responses to gun violence in light of U.S. obligations under international human rights law. As part of this project, Washington University Law students and the Harris Institute Fellow conduct in-depth research articulating mechanisms to rectify the crisis and suggesting international fora that can examine the issue. The project argues that the failure of the U.S. government to exercise due diligence with respect to preventing and reducing gun-related violence may violate the government's obligations under several international human rights instruments.

An article by Harris Institute Director Leila Sadat and Madaline George argues that U.S. gun violence violates ten specific human rights: the right to life; the right to security of person; the right to health; the right to be free from ill-treatment; the right to be free from racial discrimination; the right to gender equality; the right to freedom of religion, expression, opinion, and belief; the right to peaceful assembly and association; the right to special protection for children and the right to education; and the right to participate in the cultural life of the community.

Along with Washington University's Institute for Public Health, the Harris Institute hosted the conference and experts' meeting A New Approach to the Gun Violence Crisis in America on November 2–3, 2018, with speakers including Jonathan Hafetz of the American Civil Liberties Union, Mike McLively of the Urban Gun Violence Initiative at Brady United, Barbara Frey of the Human Rights Program at the University of Minnesota, and Philip Alpers from the University of Sydney School of Public Health. This conference resulted in the symposium edition of the Washington University Journal of Law and Policy. Language used from this project has been utilized by Amnesty International in their Gun Violence Report and echoed by then-candidate for the Democratic Presidential Nomination Elizabeth Warren during the New Hampshire 2020 Debate.

=== Engagement with international bodies ===
The Harris Institute submitted "The U.S. Gun Violence Crisis as a Violation of U.S. Obligations Under the ICCPR", in January 2019 as part of the U.N. Human Rights Committee's 2019 periodic review of the United States. When the Committee began its review in March 2019, it requested information from the U.S. government based upon issued highlighted by the Institute's submission.

The Harris Institute and Washington University's Institute for Public Health co-submitted a stakeholder report to the U.N. Human Rights Council, for the Third Universal Periodic Review of the U.S. government's interactions with human rights.

In connection to this new project, the Institute was one of four members of civil society invited to present testimony before the Inter-American Commission on Human Rights during a hearing on "The Regulation of Gun Sales and Social Violence in the United States" in Bogotá, Colombia on February 27, 2018. The hearing highlighted that there are proven and effective measures that the U.S. government can implement to reduce the number of lives lost due to gun violence. An appropriate government response that takes a public health and human rights approach to this problem would reduce homicide and suicide rates in the United States, and reduce illegal gun trafficking that is rampant in the Americas.

In November 2019, Harris Institute Fellow Madaline George presented to the Inter-American Commission on Human Rights at a hearing dedicated to the impact of gun violence upon the United States. The Harris Institute spoke at that hearing as part of a coalition of civil society representatives and victims of gun violence.

== World Peace Through Law Award ==
The World Peace Through Law Award is bestowed upon an individual who, by his or her work and writings, has considerably advanced the rule of law and thereby contributed to world peace. Established in 2006, the Award recognizes individuals who have achieved great distinction in the field of international law and international relations. To date, this award has been bestowed upon the following distinguished individuals:

- 2018 – Her Excellency Judge Christine Van den Wyngaert, Judge at the Kosovo Specialist Chambers, and former International Criminal Court Judge
- 2015 – Benjamin B. Ferenz, former Nuremberg Prosecutor
- 2013 – Sir Christopher Greenwood QC
- 2011 – Chief Prosecutor of the International Criminal Court Fatou Bensouda
- 2010 – Professor M. Cherif Bassiouni
- 2008 – The Honorable Richard Goldstone
- 2006 – Honorable Philippe Kirsch

== International Arbitration and Dispute Resolution Project ==
This annual program aims to establish a forum in which top practitioners, academics, attorneys, and students gather on an annual basis to explore sophisticated topics in international arbitration and dispute resolution; advance the development of international arbitration and dispute resolution; educate the next generation of lawyers; and provide networking opportunities.

The program seeks to advance conversations on international arbitration and dispute resolution by bringing together private practitioners, in-house and government counsel, academics, arbitration and mediation institutions, and engaging users of international arbitration and dispute resolution, particularly those from the Midwest. CLE credit is offered to lawyers who attend this symposium. Course credit may be awarded to students of Washington University School of Law, in conjunction with courses in international arbitration and international business transactions.

=== International Arbitration and Dispute Resolution Conferences ===
- International Arbitration & Dispute Resolution Symposium: What Happens Before and After International Arbitration? (February 2020)
- International Arbitration & Dispute Resolution Symposium: Challenges and Controversies in International Arbitration (March 2019)
- International Dispute Resolution: Protecting Your Client In The Global Economy (February 2015)

== Other programs ==
=== Conferences and Workshops ===
- Introduction to Medicine & Global Human Rights: Annual Forensic Documentation Workshop (November 2019)
- The Role of the ICTY in Understanding the War and Genocide in Bosnia-Herzegovina (October 2019)
- International Humanitarian Law Workshop for Professionals (w/ the American Red Cross) – (April 2019)
- International Arbitration & Dispute Resolution Symposium: Challenges and Controversies in International Arbitration (March 2019)
- American Society of International Law (ASIL) Mid-Year Meeting (October 2017)
- American Red Cross Humanitarian Law Unit International Humanitarian Law Workshop (April 2016)
- Prospects for an International Climate Change Agreement (October 2015)
- International Experts’ Meeting on the Illegal Use of Force: Reconceptualizing the Laws of War (September 2015)
- Global Perspectives on Colorism Conference (April 2015)
- The Legal Challenges of Globalization: A View from the Heartland (September 2014)
- Mini-Colloquium Conceptualizing a New Institutional Framework for International Taxation (April 2013)
- The International Criminal Court at 10 (November 2012)
- Immigration Law and Family Reunification: A Comparative Perspective (March 2012)
- International Climate Change: Post-Kyoto Challenges (October 2008)
- International Criminal Law Symposium: Judgment at Nuremberg (September/October 2006)
- Promoting U.S. - China Business Relations (May 2006)

=== Crimes Against Humanity Research Project ===
The Harris Institute recruits research assistants to support Institute Director Leila Sadat in her work as the Special Advisor on Crimes Against Humanity to the International Criminal Court Prosecutor Fatou Bensouda. As part of the CAH Research Project, students assist the Office of the Prosecutor with researching and analyzing active cases on crimes against humanity issues.

=== ICC Legal Tools Project ===
In September 2009, the Harris Institute concluded a Co-Operation Agreement with the International Criminal Court which began the ICC Legal Tools Project. Under the Co-Operation Agreement, the Institute is responsible for collecting and uploading documents for the "National Jurisdictions" and "National Cases Involving Core International Crimes" folders in the ICC Legal Tools database. The Harris Institute has been researching, collecting, and analyzing relevant domestic legislation and case law concerning genocide, crimes against humanity, and war crimes for the following States: Albania, Azerbaijan, Botswana, Burkina Faso, Cameroon, Central African Republic, Comoros, Georgia, Ghana, Kiribati, Kyrgyzstan, Lesotho, Liberia, Malawi, Mauritius, Namibia, Niger, Palau, Papua New Guinea, Samoa, Swaziland, Tajikistan, Tonga, Tuvalu, Tanzania, Uzbekistan and Zambia.

=== Ambassadors Program ===
Founded in 2007, the Harris Institute Ambassadors Program brings foreign service professionals to the law school to share their experiences and knowledge with the law school and university community. The Ambassadors Program draws current and retired professionals from the international diplomatic corps to provide students with a first-hand description of international law and policy in action.

Former Ambassadors-in-Residence include: Ambassador David Scheffer (2014), the first US Ambassador-at-Large for War Crimes Issues; Ambassador Stephen J. Rapp (2009), Ambassador Louis Susman (2012, 2015), Ambassador-at-Large for Global Criminal Justice; Ambassador Charles Stith (2009), former United States Ambassador to Tanzania; Ambassador Feisal Amin Rasoul al-Istrabadi (2009), the Ambassador Extraordinary and Plenipotentiary, Deputy Permanent Representative of Iraq to the United Nations; Carla A. Hills (2008), former United States Trade Representative; and Thomas A. Schweich (2008), former State Department coordinator for counternarcotics and Justice Reform in Afghanistan.

=== Dagen-Legomsky Student Fellowship Program ===
In 2001, Margaret Dagen–an early pioneer of the civil rights movement in St. Louis–endowed the Dagen-Legomsky Student Fellowship Program for Washington University law students to work in the field of international human rights and to study at prestigious international law summer programs during the summer recess. Research fellows have gone to the Hague Academy of International Law, The Hague, The Netherlands; Xiamen Academy of International Law, Xiamen, China; The Netherlands School of Human Rights, Utrecht University, The Netherlands; and the UN International Law Commission, Geneva, Switzerland.

With the financial support of this program, Dagen-Legomsky International Public Interest fellows partake in summer externships at the U.S. Department of Justice; the International Criminal Tribunal for Rwanda, Arusha, Tanzania; the Extraordinary Chambers in the Courts of Cambodia, Defense Section; the European Council on Refugees and Exiles, Brussels, Belgium; the Mekong Region Law Center, Bangkok, Thailand; the Korean Commercial Arbitration Board, Seoul, Republic of Korea; Centro de Estudios de las Americas, Santiago, Chile; Black Sash, Cape Town, South Africa; and many more.

=== International Humanitarian Law (IHL) Program ===
The Harris Institute International Humanitarian Law (IHL) program provided a unique opportunity to Washington University law students interested in international law field advocacy. In spring 2012, the IHL program entered into a partnership with the Enough! Project. The Washington, D.C.–based NGO works with concerned citizens, advocates, and policymakers to prevent, mitigate, and resolve crises of genocide and crimes against humanity. Law students had a unique opportunity to aid in Enough’s Raise Hope for Congo campaign through the Conflict-Free Campus Initiative (CFCI). This Initiative aimed to alleviate atrocities committed over conflict minerals in Congo by pressuring electronics companies to use conflict-free minerals in their products.
