= Nestor Courakis =

Greek professor (born 1947)

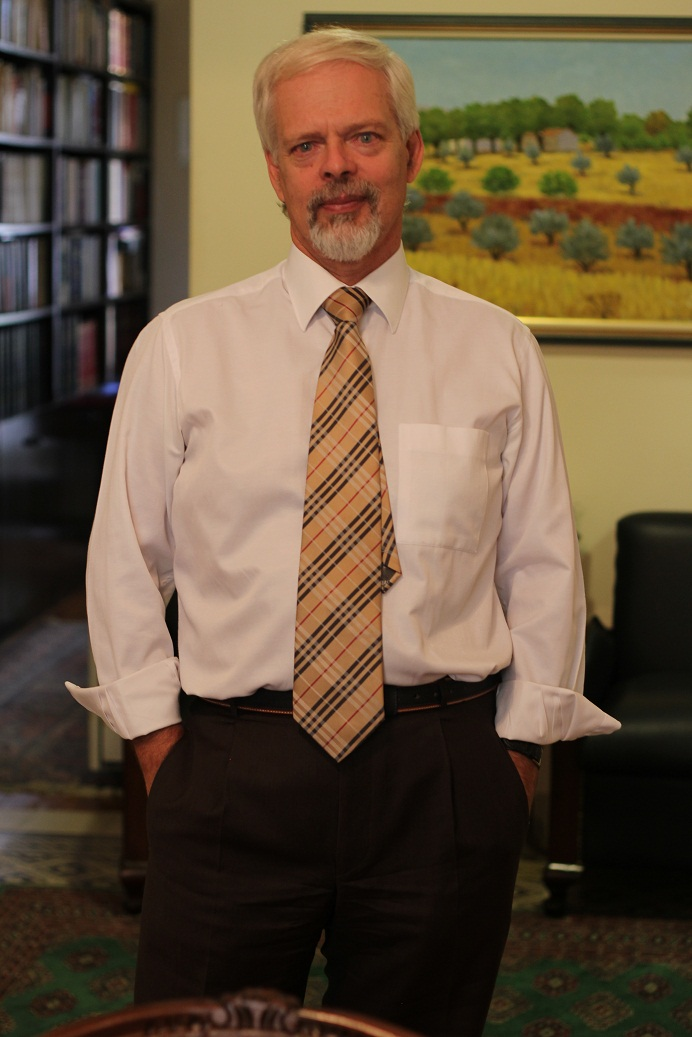
- Born: May 21, 1947 (age 79); Athens, Greece
- Awards: "Aghis Tambakopoulos Prize" of the Academy of Athens (1974), Prize of Society of Greek Penalists (1985)

Academic background
- Education: University of Athens, University of Freiburg, Panthéon-Assas University, Paris Institute of Criminology
- Thesis: (1978)

Nestor Courakis (born 21 May 1947) is Emeritus Professor of Criminology and Penology at the National and Kapodistrian University of Athens, Faculty of Law and a full-time Professor at the University of Nicosia.

== Biography ==
Born on 21 May 1947 in Athens, he attended the Law Faculty, University of Athens (LL.M. 1971), Law Faculty, University of Freiburg/Germany (Ph.D. on Penal Law 1978 with "summa cum laude"), Law Faculty, Panthéon-Assas University ("Diplôme d' Études approfondies" in Criminology, 1977), Paris Institute of Criminology (Diploma 1979); research work at Max-Planck Institute of Foreign and International Criminal Law (Freiburg, Germany) 1978–80.

He has been elected and taught as visiting fellow at Brasenose College, Oxford University (1996, 1997). He is also ordinary member of the European Academy of Sciences and Arts (2012).

A Faculty member at University of Athens, Faculty of Law, since 1981, he is actively involved with the teaching of Criminology, Forensics, Penology, Financial Crimes, Gender Criminality and Criminal Policy. In August 2014 he was awarded the title of Emeritus Professor at University of Athens, Faculty of Law, and in September 2014 he became a full-time Professor in the field of Penal Sciences at the University of Nicosia.

He has been the scientific supervisor of research teams on Hooliganism (1986–88), on Juvenile Detainees (1993–94 and Follow-up research 1999–2002), on Female Detainees (1994–96), on Juvenile Gangs in Athens (2002–2004) and on Euthanasia (2005–2007).

He has participated in Committee for the drafting of a new Greek Penitentiary Code and has represented Greece in several criminological meetings at the Council of Europe, the United Nations and the European Union; has also participated in several international conferences and has presented country-reports (e.g. International Congress of Comparative Law, Athens 1994, on Alternative Penal Sanctions in Greece, and at Preparatory Colloquium of AIDP on Organized Crime, Alexandria 1997); scientific counselor on criminological and penological matters at the Ministry of Justice, Athens 1990–93; mem. Bd. Trustees of Hellenic Society of Criminology etc.; has been mem. European Society of Criminology, International Association of Penal Law (AIDP), Société Internationale de Défence Sociale, World Society of Victimology. He has also been the Director of the Centre for Criminal and Penological Research (2001–2015), as well as the President of the Consultative Body against Corruption (2013–2015).

He is married with architect Eurydice Athanasopoulos and has three children.

He speaks Greek, English, French, German and Italian.
