= Nuremberg (miniseries) =

2000 Canadian-American docudrama miniseries

- Genre: Docudrama
- Written by: David W. Rintels
- Directed by: Yves Simoneau
- Starring: Alec Baldwin; Brian Cox; Christopher Plummer; Jill Hennessy; Matt Craven; Colm Feore; Christopher Heyerdahl; Michael Ironside; Max von Sydow
- Composer: Richard Grégoire
- Countries of origin: Canada; United States
- Original language: English
- No. of episodes: 2

Production
- Executive producers: Gerald W. Abrams, Alec Baldwin, Bernard F. Conners, Joanathan Cornick, Suzanne Girard, Peter Allen Sussman
- Producers: Mychèle Boudrias; Ian McDougall
- Cinematography: Alain Dostie
- Editor: Yves Langlois
- Running time: 180 minutes
- Production companies: Alliance Atlantis; CTV; British American Entertainment; Cypress Films; Les Productions La Fête Inc.

Original release
- Network: TNT (United States); CTV (Canada)
- Release: July 16 – July 17, 2000

Nuremberg is a 2000 Canadian-American two-part television docudrama, based on Joseph E. Persico's book Nuremberg: Infamy on Trial by Joseph E. Persico, that depicts the Nuremberg trials. It stars Alec Baldwin as Robert H. Jackson, Brian Cox as Hermann Göring, along with Max von Sydow, Christopher Plummer and Jill Hennessy. The program received mixed to positive reviews, while the performances of Baldwin and Cox received widespread acclaim.

== Plot ==
=== Part one ===
Shortly after the end of World War II, Reichsmarschall Hermann Göring surrenders to the United States and enjoys the hospitality of a U.S. Army Air Force base. Samuel Rosenman, acting on the orders of U.S. President Harry S. Truman, recruits U.S. Supreme Court Justice Robert H. Jackson to prepare a war crimes tribunal against Göring and the surviving Nazi leadership. Göring, Albert Speer and others are arrested for war crimes and imprisoned in a U.S. Army stockade at Bad Mondorf in Luxembourg. Jackson, his assistant Elsie Douglas, and his prosecution team fly to Germany. Psychologist Gustave Gilbert arrives at the stockade with prisoner Hans Frank, who has attempted suicide.

Jackson negotiates with Allied representatives Sir David Maxwell-Fyfe, General Iona Nikitchenko and Henri Donnedieu de Vabres to ensure a unified prosecution. Jackson selects the Nuremberg Palace of Justice for the site of the trials and reconstruction work commences. Göring and the others are stripped of their rank and transferred to the prison in Nuremberg, where they come into conflict with the guards under the command of the strict Colonel Burton C. Andrus. Major Airey Neave serves Göring, Speer and the others with their indictments. U.S. judge Francis Biddle arrives to take control of the court but reluctantly passes the honour at Jackson's insistence. Following the suicide of prisoner Robert Ley, round-the-clock watches are posted and Gilbert is appointed prisoner liaison.

Sir Geoffrey Lawrence as presiding judge opens the trial with all defendants pleading not guilty, and Jackson gives a stirring opening statement. At lunch, a jovial Göring holds court over the other defendants while Speer begins to show signs of remorse. Maxwell-Fyfe puts forward an emotive eyewitness account of the Nazis' genocidal policies toward Jews and others, while Jackson reads out dry documentation. As the court begins to tire of Jackson's meticulous approach, Maxwell-Fyfe urges pushing on to the witness interviews, which reveal the horrors of the concentration camps. The court is shaken by documentary footage of the camps; Göring initially appears unsettled but scoffs it as "propaganda" as he is led from the courtroom back to his jail cell.

=== Part two ===
Speer explains Göring's dominance to Gilbert and insists that his control over the others must be broken. Göring takes the stand and begins using it to speak to the German people. Jackson, at Gilbert's suggestion, has Göring isolated. Under cross-examination, Göring outmaneuvers and humiliates Jackson, who later accuses Biddle of giving Göring free rein in court. Douglas talks Jackson out of tendering his resignation, and the two share a kiss. Under advice from Maxwell-Fyfe, Jackson returns to the courtroom to confront Göring with evidence of his crimes against the Jews and successfully dismisses the defendant's denials.

At a Christmas party, the German housekeeper refuses to serve the Soviets, but Douglas rescues the situation before slipping away with Jackson. Gilbert visits the defendants and, under Jackson's advice, attempts to convince them to take responsibility for their crimes. Andrus relaxes the prison rules for Christmas, and Göring shares a friendly drink with his guard, Lt. Tex Wheelis. The cross-examination of the defendants intensifies and the defence calls Rudolf Höss, who casually reveals the horrors of Auschwitz. Göring makes a commentary on American racism to Gilbert. Speer is implicated in the enslavement of foreign workers by fellow defendant Fritz Sauckel and in response accepts collective responsibility for the crimes of the Nazi regime.

Gilbert interviews Göring's wife Emmy, who reveals that Hitler had ordered them all executed, which led to the family's surrender. Jackson is moved by Gilbert's summation of his examinations – that the source of the evil behind Nazi Germany was a complete lack of empathy – to give an impassioned closing statement. Göring uses his final statement to condemn the trial, and is sentenced along with several others to death by hanging. Speer uses his final statement to commend the tribunal and is sentenced to 20 years in prison. Göring commits suicide after his request to be executed by firing squad is denied. Andrus presides over the executions of the others while Jackson and Douglas head home.

== Cast ==
- Alec Baldwin as Supreme Court Justice Robert H. Jackson
- Brian Cox as Reichsmarschall Hermann Göring
- Christopher Plummer as Sir David Maxwell Fyfe
- Jill Hennessy as Elsie Douglas
- Matt Craven as Capt. Gustave Gilbert
- Christopher Heyerdahl as Ernst Kaltenbrunner
- Roger Dunn as Col. Robert Storey
- David McIlwraith as Col. John Amen
- Christopher Shyer as Col. Telford Taylor
- Hrothgar Mathews as Thomas J. Dodd
- Herbert Knaup as Albert Speer
- Frank Moore as Hans Frank
- Frank Fontaine as Wilhelm Keitel
- Raymond Cloutier as Karl Dönitz
- Bill Corday as Alfred Jodl
- Ken Kramer as Fritz Sauckel
- Max von Sydow as Samuel Rosenman
- Mark Walker as Gen. Carl Spaatz
- Sam Stone as Julius Streicher
- Douglas O'Keeffe as Baldur von Schirach
- Benoit Girard as Joachim von Ribbentrop
- James Bradford as Hjalmar Schacht
- Frank Burns as Wilhelm Frick
- Erwin Potitt as Walther Funk
- Tom Rack as Hans Fritzsche
- Roc LaFortune as Rudolf Hess
- Colm Feore as Rudolf Höß
- Dennis St. John as Franz von Papen
- Griffith Brewer as Konstantin von Neurath
- Gabriel Gascon as Erich Raeder
- Julien Poulin as Dr. Robert Ley
- Alain Fournier as Alfred Rosenberg
- René Gagnon as Arthur Seyss-Inquart
- Len Cariou as Francis Biddle
- David Francis as Geoffrey Lawrence, 1st Baron Oaksey
- Len Doncheff as Gen. Iona Nikitchenko
- Paul Hébert as Henri Donnedieu de Vabres
- Michael Ironside as Col. Burton C. Andrus
- Charlotte Gainsbourg as Marie-Claude Vaillant-Couturier
- Geoffrey Pounsett as Maj. Airey Neave
- Steve Adams as Brig. Gen. Lucius D. Clay
- Paul Hopkins as Capt. Dan Kiley
- Susan Glover as Emmy Göring
- Scott Gibson as Lt. Tex Wheelis

== Production ==
Baldwin was drawn to the role as Court Justice Robert Jackson. Actual footage of camps, taken from the documentary Nazi Concentration and Prison Camps (1945), was included in this miniseries.

== Reception ==
In the United States, the miniseries aired on the network TNT, where it received the highest-ever viewership ratings for a basic cable miniseries up to that point. Reviewer Mark Lawson praised the performances of Baldwin and Cox but had mixed feelings on the production details, in particular the romantic subplot. Colin Jacobson of DVD Movie Guide have similar thoughts but praised Cox for capturing "arrogance and supreme sense of self-importance". Reviewer Guy Lodge of Variety wrote of the series, "an engaging but mostly unprovocative pic, a decent, slickly packaged, but not especially thoughtful, primer about the true 'trial of the century.'"

Julie Salamon called the series a "tense, exciting and supremely awesome drama ... [that] puts the story of the trial in simple human terms and yet brings it all into a drama of monumental unity and scope". Another reviewer praised the series. Richard Corliss praised the performances. Others that were mixed or negative felt Baldwin to be miscast. John Winters felt the series "has more emotional power than any melodrama and the inaccuracies elsewhere in the script should not be used as an excuse to deny the truth of what happened." The scholar Steven N. Lipkin notes that the docudrama presents Jackson and Göring as two different performers during the course of the trial, contrasting Jackson's rationalism and his reliance on documentary evidence with Göring's melodramatic strategy and charismatic and theatrical courtroom performance.

=== Awards and nominations ===
Year	Award	Category	Nominee(s)	Result	Ref.
2001	American Cinema Editors Awards	Best Edited Episode from a Television Mini-Series	Yves Langlois (for "Part 2")	Nominated	
2001	Artios Awards	Best Casting for Mini-Series	Iris Grossman	Nominated	
2001	Gemini Awards	Best Dramatic Miniseries	Peter Sussman, Gerald W. Abrams, Alec Baldwin, Mychèle Boudrias, Jon Cornick, Suzanne Girard, and Ian McDougall	Won	
2001	Gemini Awards	Best Performance by an Actor in a Leading Role in a Dramatic Program or Miniseries	Alec Baldwin	Nominated	
2001	Gemini Awards	Best Performance by an Actor in a Featured Supporting Role in a Dramatic Program or Miniseries	Brian Cox	Won	
2001	Gemini Awards	Best Direction in a Dramatic Program or Miniseries	Yves Simoneau	Nominated	
2001	Gemini Awards	Best Costume Design	Mario Davignon	Nominated	
2001	Gemini Awards	Best Achievement in Makeup	Micheline Trépanier and Carl Fullerton	Nominated	
2001	Gemini Awards	Best Original Music Score for a Program or Miniseries	Richard Grégoire	Nominated	
2001	Gemini Awards	Best Photography in a Dramatic Program or Series	Alain Dostie	Nominated	
2001	Gemini Awards	Best Production Design or Art Direction in a Dramatic Program or Series	Guy Lalande and Frances Calder	Won	
2001	Gemini Awards	Best Overall Sound in a Dramatic Program or Series	Claude La Haye, Lou Solakofski, Orest Sushko, and Ian Rankin	Nominated	
2001	Gemini Awards	Best Sound Editing in a Dramatic Program or Series	Paul Shikata, Donna G. Powell, Rick Cadger, and Ronayne Higginson	Nominated	
2001	Gemini Awards	Best Visual Effects	Noel Hooper, Mark Fordham, Robin Mitchell, and Michael Pieczonka	Won	
2001	Golden Globe Awards	Best Miniseries or Motion Picture Made for Television		Nominated	
2001	Golden Globe Awards	Best Actor in a Miniseries or Motion Picture Made for Television	Alec Baldwin	Nominated	
2001	Golden Globe Awards	Best Actor in a Miniseries or Motion Picture Made for Television	Brian Cox	Nominated	
2001	Golden Reel Awards	Best Sound Editing – Television Mini-Series – Dialogue & ADR	Richard Cadger and Ronayne Higginson	Won	
2001	Golden Reel Awards	Best Sound Editing – Television Mini-Series – Effects & Foley	Richard Cadger and Paul Shikata	Nominated	
2001	Online Film & Television Association Awards	Best Miniseries		Nominated	
2001	Online Film & Television Association Awards	Best Supporting Actor in a Motion Picture or Miniseries	Brian Cox	Nominated	
2001	Online Film & Television Association Awards	Best Direction of a Motion Picture or Miniseries		Nominated	
2001	Online Film & Television Association Awards	Best Writing of a Motion Picture or Miniseries		Nominated	
2001	Online Film & Television Association Awards	Best Ensemble in a Motion Picture or Miniseries		Nominated	
2001	Online Film & Television Association Awards	Best Costume Design in a Motion Picture or Miniseries		Nominated	
2001	Online Film & Television Association Awards	Best Editing in a Motion Picture or Miniseries		Nominated	
2001	Online Film & Television Association Awards	Best Lighting in a Motion Picture or Miniseries		Nominated	
2001	Online Film & Television Association Awards	Best Music in a Motion Picture or Miniseries		Nominated	
2001	Online Film & Television Association Awards	Best New Theme Song in a Motion Picture or Miniseries		Nominated	
2001	Online Film & Television Association Awards	Best Production Design in a Motion Picture or Miniseries		Nominated	
2001	Online Film & Television Association Awards	Best Sound in a Motion Picture or Miniseries		Nominated	
2001	Primetime Emmy Awards	Outstanding Miniseries	Peter Alan Sussman, Suzanne Girard, Jonathan Cornick, Alec Baldwin, Gerald W. Abrams, Ian McDougall, and Mychèle Boudrias	Nominated	
2001	Primetime Emmy Awards	Outstanding Supporting Actor in a Miniseries or a Movie	Brian Cox	Won	
2001	Primetime Emmy Awards	Outstanding Single-Camera Sound Mixing for a Miniseries or a Movie	Lou Solakofski, Orest Sushko, and Ian Rankin (for "Part 2")	Won	
2001	Primetime Emmy Awards	Outstanding Sound Editing for a Miniseries, Movie or a Special	Paul Shikata, Richard Cadger, Ronayne Higginson, and Donna Powell (for "Part 2")	Nominated	
2001	Producers Guild of America Awards	David L. Wolper Award for Outstanding Producer of Long-Form Television		Nominated	
2001	Satellite Awards	Best Motion Picture Made for Television		Nominated	
2001	Satellite Awards	Best Actress in a Miniseries or a Motion Picture Made for Television	Jill Hennessy	Won	
2001	Screen Actors Guild Awards	Outstanding Performance by a Male Actor in a Miniseries or Television Movie	Alec Baldwin	Nominated	
2001	Screen Actors Guild Awards	Outstanding Performance by a Male Actor in a Miniseries or Television Movie	Brian Cox	Nominated	

== Historical accuracy ==
The programme was presented as being partly fictionalised, with some characters and events created for dramatic purposes. Göring, his wife, and daughter are depicting driving to surrender to an American air corps base in Germany on May 12, 1945. In reality, Göring, after sending an aide to Brigadier General Robert I. Stack in which he offered to surrender to Dwight D. Eisenhower personally, was discovered and arrested in a traffic jam near Radstadt by a detachment of the Seventh United States Army, which was sent through the German lines to find him and bring him to a secure American position, on May 6, 1945.

Justice Jackson is portrayed as initially failing in his cross-examination of Gӧring and emerging triumphant on the second day. In reality, the cross-examination was a disaster and severely damaged Jackson's reputation. This situation was recovered by Maxwell Fyfe. The series implies Jackson engineered the tribunal and carried out the prosecution almost single-handedly. In reality, scores of lawyers, researchers, clerks, and others were involved. The love affair between Jackson and Douglas is fictional.

When the defendants are indicted by Major Neave, they all make oral statements. In reality, these statements were collected by Captain Gustave Gilbert. He asked the defendants to write their first reactions on a copy of the indictments. Albert Speer is depicted being arrested while giving a lecture to American soldiers. In reality, Speer was arrested along with Karl Dönitz and Alfred Jodl in Flensburg where they had set up a provisional government. Captain Gilbert is graciously given the right to talk to the prisoners by Col. Andrus in exchange for a library and an exercise field. In reality, Gilbert was specifically appointed to talk to the prisoners by the U.S. military. The idea was that Andrus was to be informed by Gilbert about the state of mind of the prisoners.

== Streaming ==
In 2017, parts 1 & 2 were released online on Canada Media Fund's Encore+ YouTube channel.

== See also ==
- Judgment at Nuremberg (1961)
- Nuremberg (2025 film), starring Russell Crowe as Göring

== Bibliography ==
- Lipkin, Steven N. (2011). Docudrama Performs the Past: Arenas of Argument in Films based on True Stories. Cambridge Scholars Publishing. ISBN 9781443827874.
