= Nuremberg trials =

Trials of Nazi German leaders

Coordinates: 49°27′16″N 11°02′54″E

International Military Tribunal
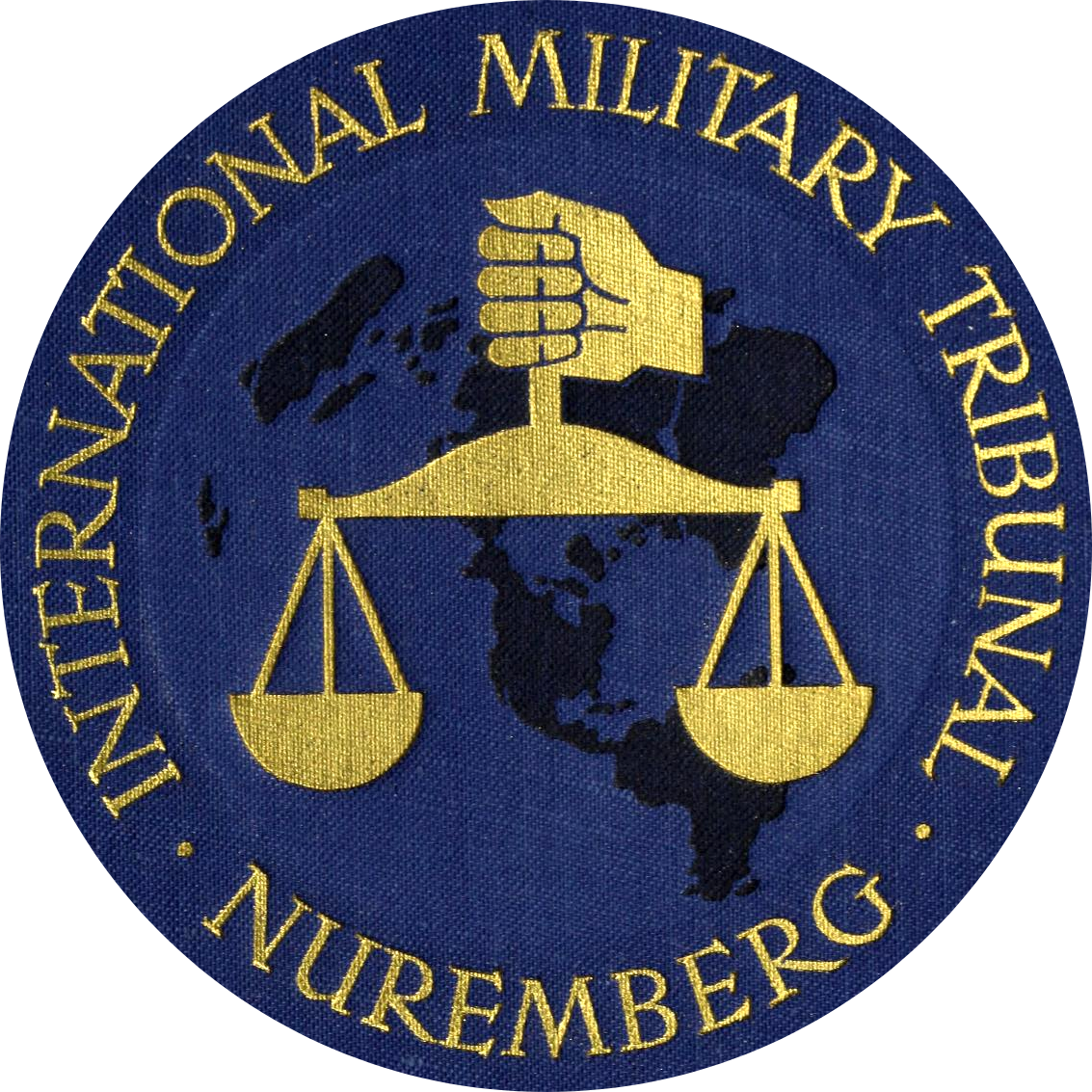
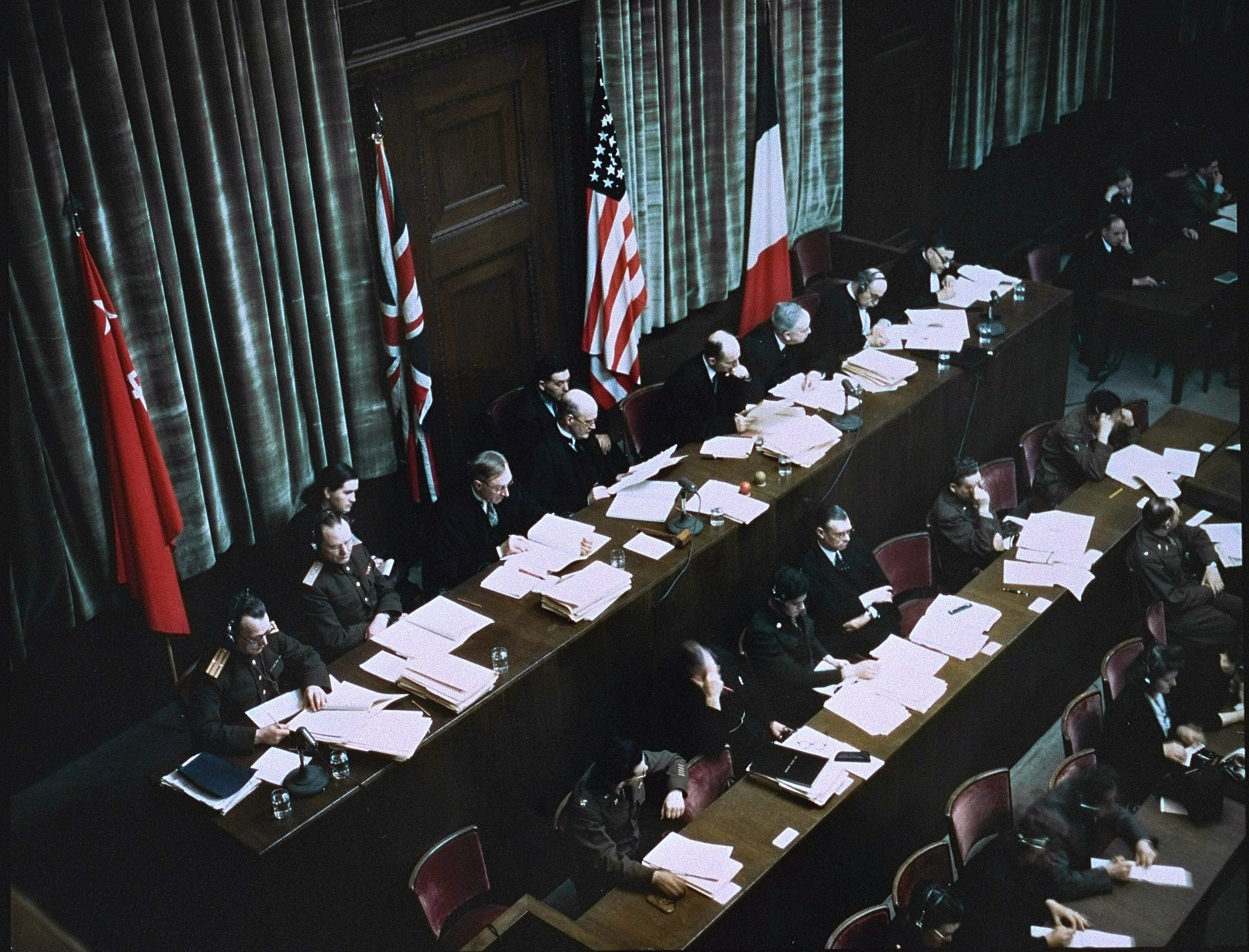
- Judges' bench at the Palace of Justice, Nuremberg
- Indictment: Conspiracy; crimes against peace; war crimes; crimes against humanity
- Started: 20 November 1945
- Decided: 1 October 1946
- Defendants: 24 (see list)
- Witnesses: 37 prosecution, 83 defense
- Transcripts: Harvard Law School; Yale Law School

Case history
- Related actions: Subsequent Nuremberg trials; International Military Tribunal for the Far East

Court membership
- Judges sitting: Iona Nikitchenko (Soviet Union); Geoffrey Lawrence (UK); Francis Biddle (US); Donnedieu de Vabres (France); and deputies (Note: Alexander Volchkov (Soviet Union), Norman Birkett (UK), John J. Parker (US) and Robert Falco (France).)

The Nuremberg trials were international criminal trials held by France, the Soviet Union, the United Kingdom, and the United States against leaders of defeated Nazi Germany for plotting and carrying out invasions of several countries across Europe and committing atrocities against their citizens in the Second World War.

Between 1939 and 1945, Nazi Germany invaded many countries across Europe, inflicting 27 million deaths in the Soviet Union alone. Proposals for how to punish the defeated Nazi leaders ranged from a show trial (the Soviet Union) to summary executions (the United Kingdom). In mid-1945, France, the Soviet Union, the United Kingdom, and the United States agreed to convene a joint tribunal in Nuremberg, occupied Germany, with the Nuremberg Charter as its legal instrument. Between 20 November 1945 and 1 October 1946, the International Military Tribunal (IMT) tried 22 of the most important surviving leaders of Nazi Germany in the political, military, and economic spheres, as well as six German organizations. The purpose of the trial was not only to try the defendants but also to assemble irrefutable evidence of Nazi war crimes, offer a history lesson to the defeated Germans, and delegitimize the traditional German elite.

The IMT verdict followed the prosecution in declaring the crime of plotting and waging aggressive war (in violation of the Kellogg–Briand Pact), "the supreme international crime" because "it contains within itself the accumulated evil of the whole". Most defendants were also charged with war crimes and crimes against humanity, the Holocaust being a major focus in the trials. Twelve further trials were conducted by the United States against lower-level perpetrators and focused more on the Holocaust. Controversial at the time for their retroactive criminalization of aggression, the trials' innovation of holding individuals responsible for violations of international law is considered "the true beginning of international criminal law".

== Origin ==
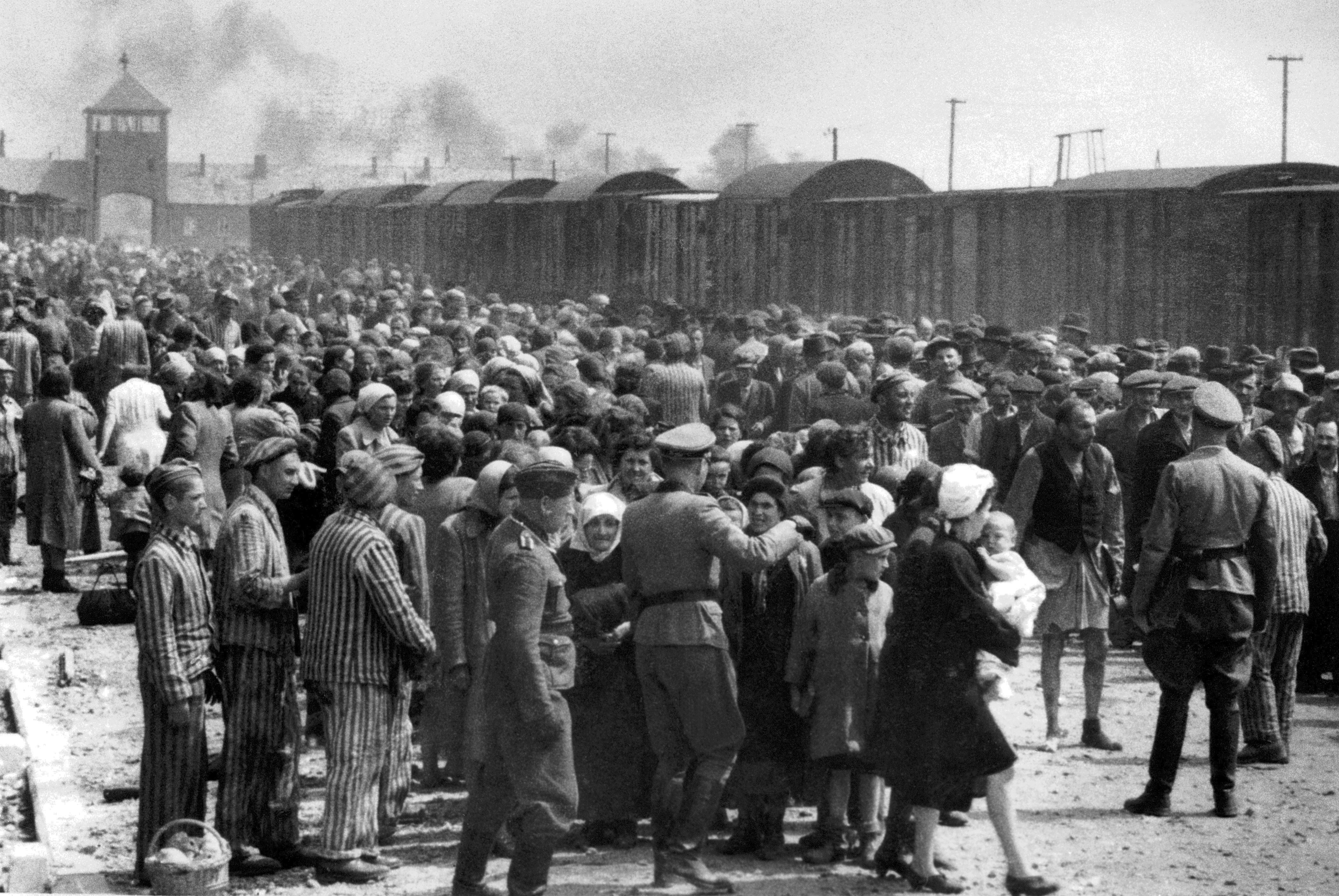
Jews arriving at Auschwitz concentration camp, 1944. According to legal historian Kirsten Sellars, the extermination camps "formed the moral core of the Allies' case against the Nazi leaders".

Between 1939 and 1945, Nazi Germany invaded many European countries, including Poland, Denmark, Norway, the Netherlands, Belgium, Luxembourg, France, Yugoslavia, Greece, and the Soviet Union. German aggression was accompanied by immense brutality in occupied areas; war losses in the Soviet Union alone included 27 million dead, mostly civilians, which was one seventh (14%) of the prewar population. The legal reckoning was premised on the extraordinary nature of Nazi criminality, particularly the perceived singularity of the systematic murder of millions of Jews.

In early 1942, representatives of nine governments-in-exile from German-occupied Europe issued a declaration to demand an international court to try the German crimes committed in occupied countries. The United States and United Kingdom refused to endorse this proposal, citing the failure of war crimes prosecutions following World War I. The London-based United Nations War Crimes Commission—without Soviet participation—first met in October 1943 and became bogged down in the scope of its mandate, with Belgian jurist Marcel de Baer and Czech legal scholar Bohuslav Ečer arguing for a broader definition of war crimes that would include "the crime of war".

On 1 November 1943, the Soviet Union, United Kingdom, and United States issued the Moscow Declaration, warning Nazi leadership of the signatories' intent to "pursue them to the uttermost ends of the earth ... in order that justice may be done". The declaration stated high-ranking Nazis who had committed crimes in several countries would be dealt with jointly, while others would be tried where they had committed their crimes.

Soviet jurist Aron Trainin developed the concept of crimes against peace (waging aggressive war) which would later be central to the proceedings at Nuremberg. Trainin's ideas were reprinted in the West and widely adopted. Of all the Allies, the Soviet Union lobbied most intensely for trying the defeated German leaders for aggression in addition to war crimes. The Soviet Union wanted to hold a trial with a predetermined outcome similar to the 1930s Moscow trials, in order to demonstrate the Nazi leaders' guilt and build a case for war reparations to rebuild the Soviet economy, which had been devastated by the war.

The United States, however, insisted on a trial that would be seen as legitimate in order to promote reform of Germany and demonstrate the superiority of the Western system. The United States Department of War was drawing up plans for an international tribunal in late 1944 and early 1945. The British government still preferred the summary execution of Nazi leaders, citing the failure of trials following World War I and qualms about retroactive criminality. The form that retribution would take was left unresolved at the Yalta Conference in February 1945.

On 2 May, at the San Francisco Conference which drafted the United Nations Charter, U.S. president Harry S. Truman announced the formation of an international military tribunal. Germany surrendered unconditionally on 8 May, 1945, bringing an end to the war in Europe.

== Establishment ==
=== Nuremberg charter ===
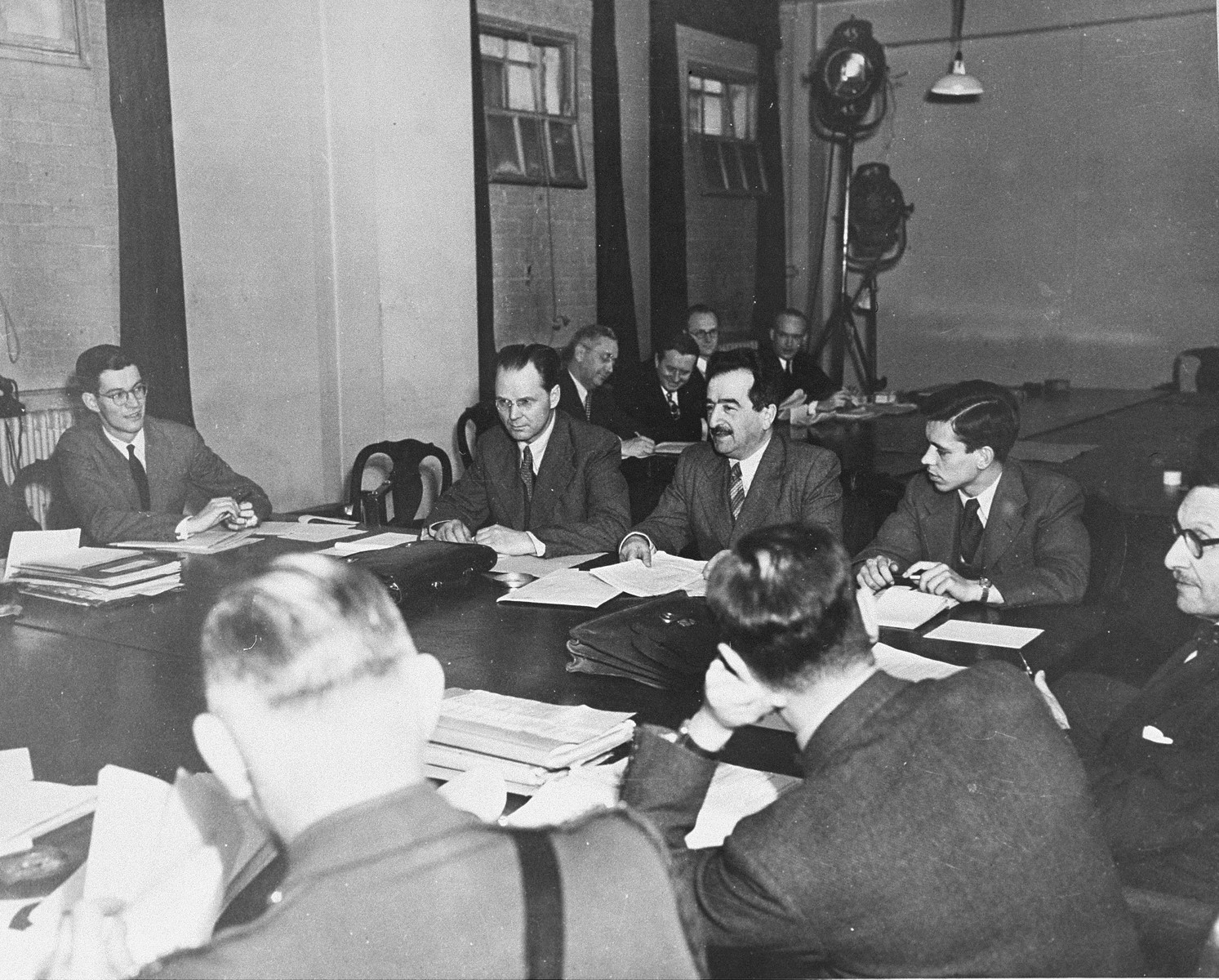
Aron Trainin (center, with moustache) speaks at the London Conference.

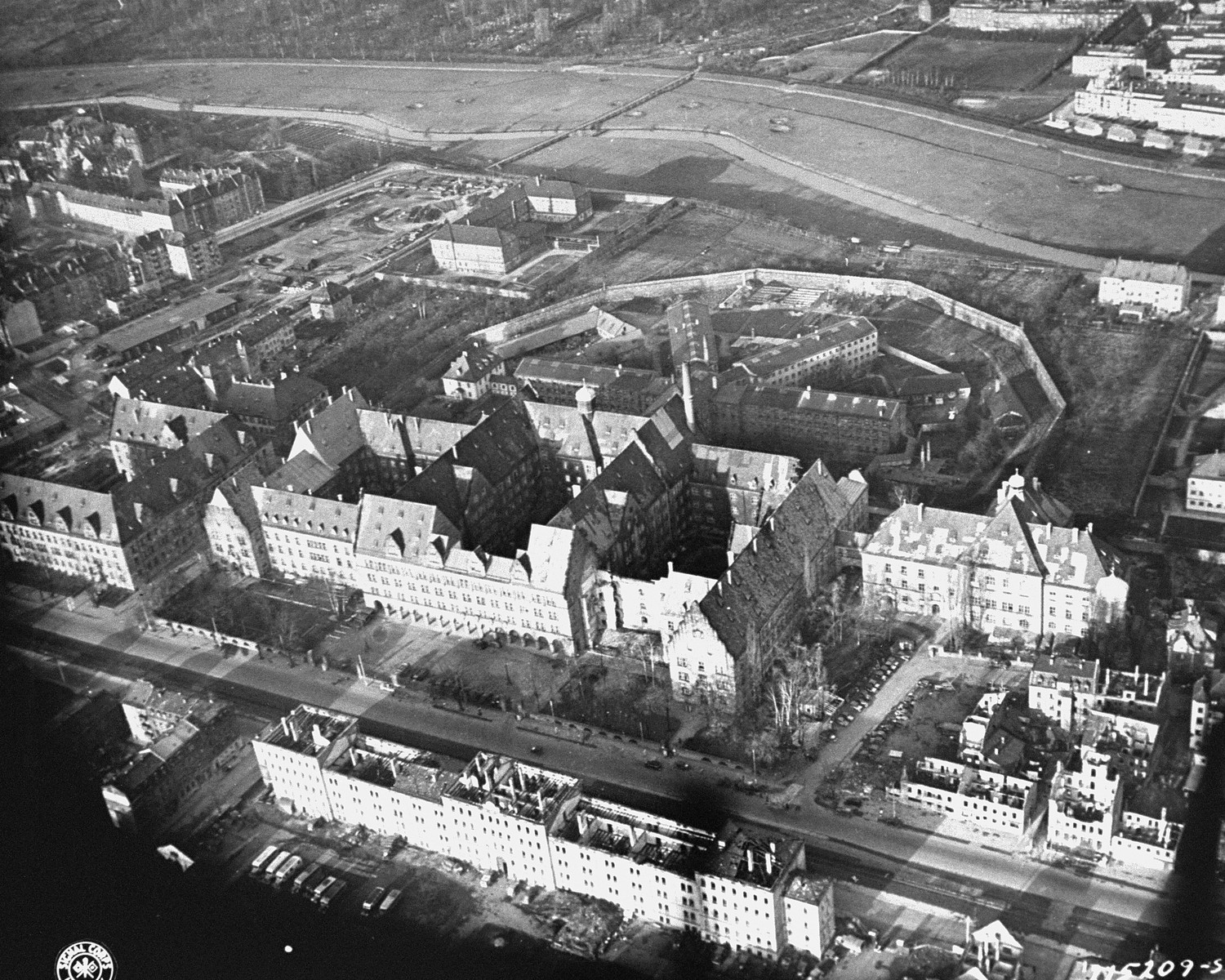
Aerial view of the Palace of Justice in 1945, with the prison attached behind it

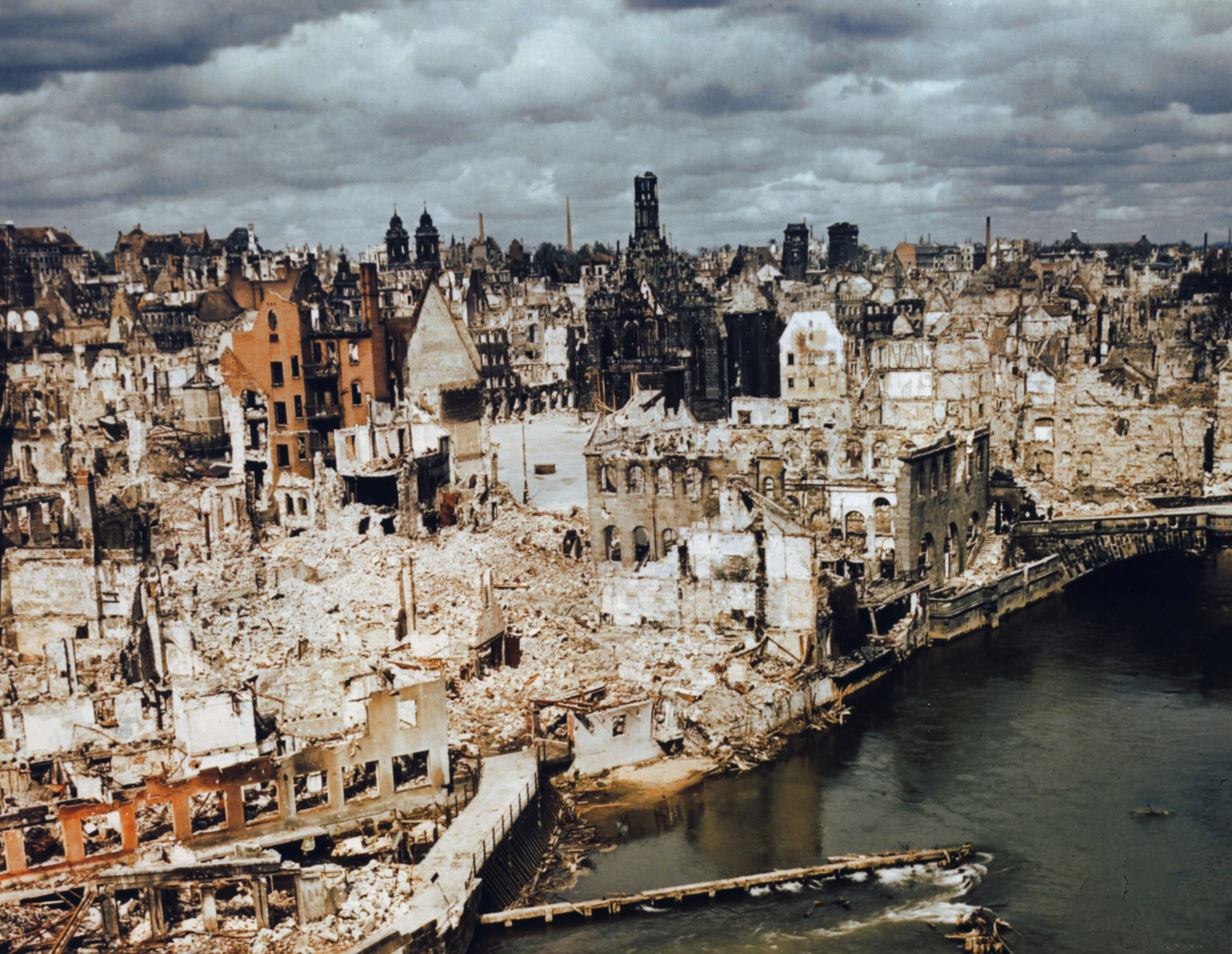
Ruins of Nuremberg, c. 1945

At the London Conference, held from 26 June to 2 August 1945, representatives of France, the Soviet Union, the United Kingdom, and the United States negotiated the form that the trial would take. Until the end of the negotiations, it was not clear that any trial would be held at all.

The offences that would be prosecuted were crimes against peace, crimes against humanity, and war crimes. At the conference, it was debated whether wars of aggression were prohibited in existing customary international law; regardless, before the charter was adopted there was no law providing for criminal responsibility for aggression. Despite misgivings from other Allies, American negotiator and Supreme Court justice Robert H. Jackson threatened the United States' withdrawal if aggression was not prosecuted because it had been the rationale for American entry into World War II. However, Jackson conceded on defining crimes against peace; the other three Allies were opposed because it would undermine the freedom of action of the United Nations Security Council.

War crimes already existed in international law as criminal violations of the laws and customs of war, but these did not apply to a government's treatment of its own citizens. Legal experts sought a way to try crimes against German citizens, such as the German Jews. A Soviet proposal for a charge of "crimes against civilians" was renamed "crimes against humanity" at Jackson's suggestion after previous uses of the term in the post-World War I Commission of Responsibilities and in failed efforts to prosecute the perpetrators of the Armenian genocide. The British proposal to define crimes against humanity was largely accepted, with the final wording being "murder, extermination, enslavement, deportation, and other inhumane acts committed against any civilian population". The final version of the charter limited the tribunal's jurisdiction over crimes against humanity to those committed as part of a war of aggression. During the 1945 London Conference, both the United States and the Soviet Union explicitly resisted giving the International Military Tribunal broad jurisdiction over a state's peacetime treatment of its own citizens to protect their own domestic affairs from international scrutiny. American prosecutors sought to insulate domestic racial inequality—specifically the institutionalized system of Jim Crow segregation in the South—from forming a precedent for international intervention. The Soviet delegation, operating under Stalin's oversight, sought to prevent any universal human rights standards from exposing or criminalizing internal Soviet atrocities, including the mass political purges of the Great Terror and the forced ethnic deportations of minority populations. To avoid these vulnerabilities, the Allies agreed on a compromise in Article 6(c) of the Nuremberg Charter. They limited the scope of "crimes against humanity" by requiring that the offenses be connected to an international war of aggression.

The charter upended the traditional view of international law by holding individuals, rather than states, responsible for breaches. The other three Allies' proposal to limit the definition of the crimes to acts committed by the defeated Axis was rejected by Jackson. Instead, the charter limited the jurisdiction of the court to Germany's actions. Article 7 prevented the defendants from claiming sovereign immunity, and Article 8 meant that the plea of acting under superior orders was not a valid defence, although it might be treated in mitigation. The trial was held under modified common law. The negotiators decided that the tribunal's permanent seat would be in Berlin, while the trial would be held at the Palace of Justice in Nuremberg. Located in the American occupation zone, Nuremberg was a symbolic location as the site of Nazi rallies. The Palace of Justice was relatively intact but needed to be renovated for the trial due to bomb damage; it had an attached prison where the defendants could be held. On 8 August, the Nuremberg Charter was signed in London.

=== Judges and prosecutors ===
In early 1946, there were a thousand employees from the four countries' delegations in Nuremberg, of which about two thirds were from the United States. Besides legal professionals, there were many social-science researchers, psychologists, translators, interpreters, and graphic designers, the last to make the many charts used during the trial. Each state appointed a prosecution team and two judges, one being a deputy without voting rights.

Jackson (whom historian Kim Christian Priemel described as "a versatile politician and a remarkable orator, if not a great legal thinker") was appointed the United States' chief prosecutor. The United States prosecution believed Nazism was the product of a German deviation from the West (the Sonderweg thesis) and sought to correct this deviation with a trial that would serve both retributive and educational purposes. As the largest delegation, it would take on the bulk of the prosecutorial effort. At Jackson's recommendation, the United States appointed judges Francis Biddle and John Parker. The British chief prosecutor was Hartley Shawcross, Attorney General for England and Wales, assisted by his predecessor David Maxwell Fyfe. Although the chief British judge, Sir Geoffrey Lawrence (Lord Justice of Appeal), was the nominal president of the tribunal, in practice Biddle exercised more authority.

The French prosecutor, François de Menthon, had just overseen trials of the leaders of Vichy France; he resigned in January 1946 and was replaced by Auguste Champetier de Ribes. The French judges were Henri Donnedieu de Vabres, a professor of criminal law, and deputy Robert Falco, a judge of the Cour de Cassation who had represented France at the London Conference. The French government tried to appoint staff untainted by collaboration with the Vichy regime; some appointments, including Champetier de Ribes, were of those who had been in the French Resistance. Expecting a show trial, the Soviet Union initially appointed as chief prosecutor Iona Nikitchenko, who had presided over the Moscow trials, but he was made a judge and replaced by Roman Rudenko, a show trial prosecutor chosen for his skill as an orator. The Soviet judges and prosecutors were not permitted to make any major decisions without consulting a commission in Moscow led by Soviet politician Andrey Vyshinsky; the resulting delays hampered the Soviet effort to set the agenda. The influence of the Soviet delegation was also constrained by limited English proficiency, lack of interpreters, and unfamiliarity with diplomacy and international institutions.

Requests by Chaim Weizmann, the president of the World Zionist Organization, as well as the Provisional Government of National Unity in Poland, for an active role in the trial justified by their representation of victims of Nazi crimes were rejected. The Soviet Union invited prosecutors from its allies, including Poland, Czechoslovakia, and Yugoslavia; Denmark and Norway also sent a delegation. Although the Polish delegation was not empowered to intervene in the proceedings, it submitted evidence and an indictment, succeeding at drawing some attention to crimes committed against Polish Jews and non-Jews.

=== Indictment ===
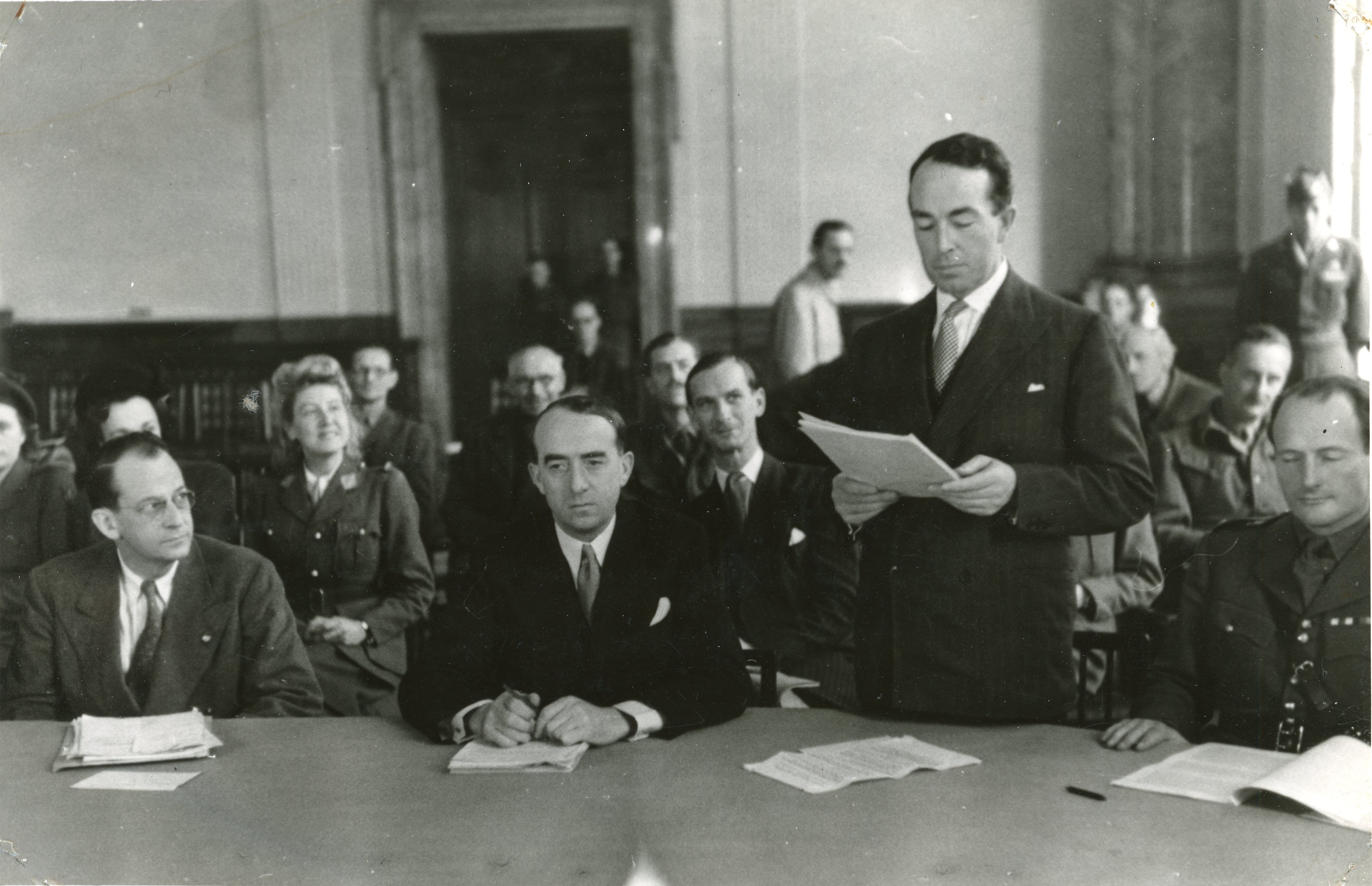
Handing over the indictment to the tribunal, 18 October 1945

The work of drafting the indictment was divided up by the national delegations. The British worked on aggressive war; the other delegations were assigned the task of covering crimes against humanity and war crimes committed on the Western Front (France) and the Eastern Front (the Soviet Union). The United States delegation outlined the overall Nazi conspiracy and criminality of Nazi organizations. The British and American delegations decided to work jointly in drafting the charges of conspiracy to wage aggressive war. On 17 September, the various delegations met to discuss the indictment.

The charge of conspiracy, absent from the charter, held together the wide array of charges and defendants and was used to charge the top Nazi leaders, as well as bureaucrats who had never killed anyone or perhaps even directly ordered killing. It was also a strategic measure intended to overcome obstacles posed by the charter's limits on charging crimes committed before the beginning of World War II. Conspiracy charges were central to the cases against propagandists and industrialists: the former were charged with providing the ideological justification for war and other crimes, while the latter were accused of enabling Germany's war effort. The charge, a brainchild of the U.S. War Department lawyer Murray C. Bernays, and perhaps inspired by his previous work prosecuting securities fraud, was spearheaded by the United States and less popular with the other delegations, particularly France.

The problem of translating the indictment and evidence into the three official languages of the tribunal—English, French, and Russian—as well as German was severe due to the scale of the task and difficulty of recruiting interpreters, especially in the Soviet Union. Vyshinsky demanded extensive corrections to the charges of crimes against peace, especially regarding the role of the 1939 German–Soviet pact and its secret protocols in starting World War II. Jackson also separated out an overall conspiracy charge from the other three charges, aiming that the American prosecution would cover the overall Nazi conspiracy while the other delegations would flesh out the details of Nazi crimes. The division of labor, and the haste with which the indictment was prepared, resulted in duplication, imprecise language, and lack of attribution of specific charges to individual defendants.

=== Defendants ===
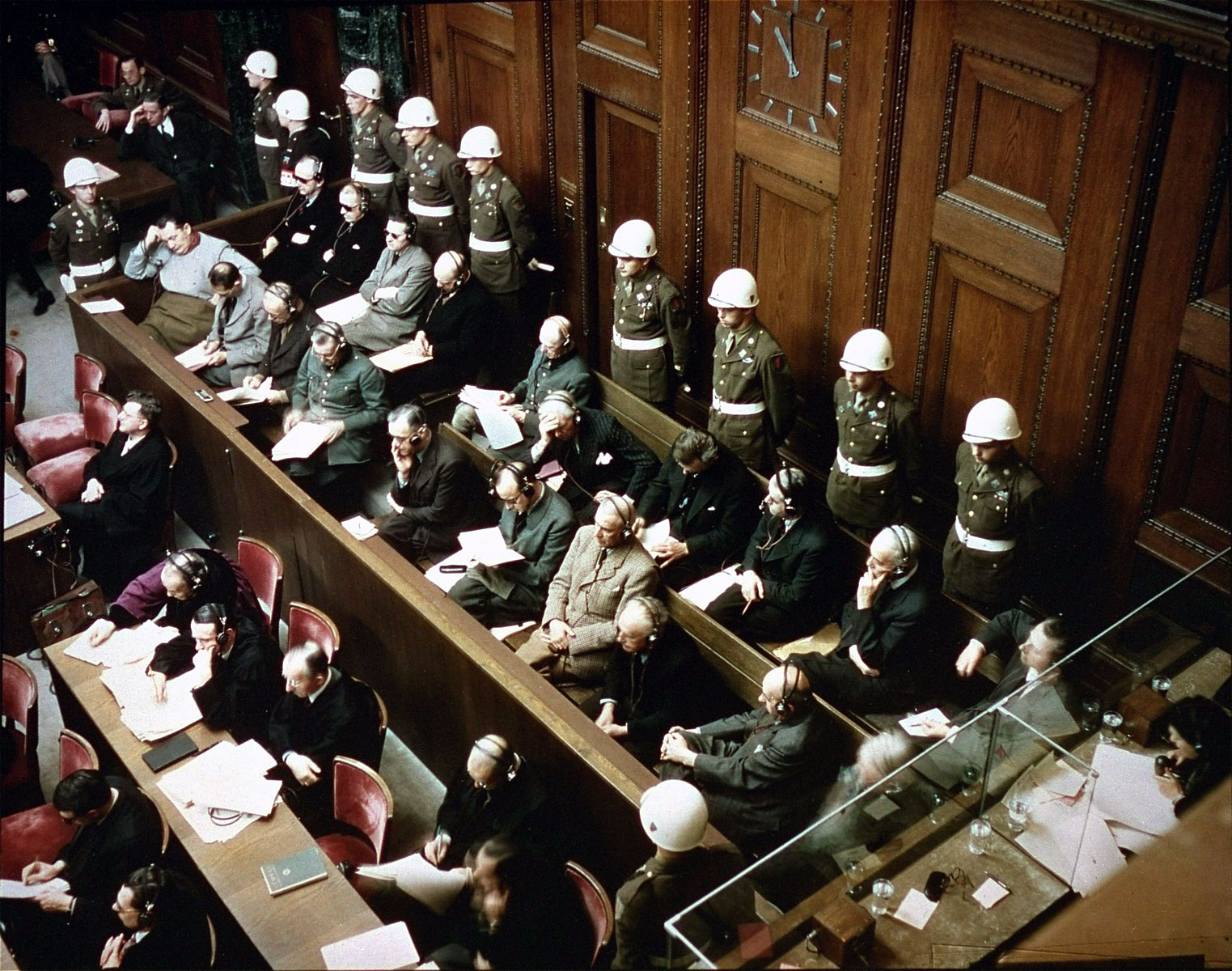
The defendants in the dock

Some of the most prominent Nazis—Adolf Hitler, Heinrich Himmler, and Joseph Goebbels—had committed suicide and therefore could not be tried. The prosecutors aimed to prosecute key leaders in German politics, business, and the military. Most of the defendants had surrendered to the United States or United Kingdom.

The defendants, who were largely unrepentant, included former cabinet ministers Franz von Papen (who had brought Hitler to power), Joachim von Ribbentrop (foreign minister), Konstantin von Neurath (foreign minister), Wilhelm Frick (interior minister), and Alfred Rosenberg, minister for the occupied eastern territories. Also prosecuted were leaders of the German economy, such as Gustav Krupp of the Krupp AG conglomerate, former Reichsbank president Hjalmar Schacht, and economic planners Albert Speer and Walther Funk, along with Speer's subordinate and head of the forced labor program, Fritz Sauckel. While the British were skeptical of prosecuting economic leaders, the French had a strong interest in highlighting German economic imperialism. The military leaders were Hermann Göring—the most infamous surviving Nazi and the main target of the trial—Wilhelm Keitel, Alfred Jodl, Erich Raeder, and Karl Dönitz. Also on trial were propagandists Julius Streicher and Hans Fritzsche; Rudolf Hess, Hitler's deputy who had flown to Britain in 1941; Hans Frank, governor-general of the General Governorate of Poland; Hitler Youth leader Baldur von Schirach; Arthur Seyss-Inquart, Reich Commissioner for the Netherlands and former Chancellor of Austria; and Ernst Kaltenbrunner, leader of Himmler's Reich Security Main Office. Observers of the trial found the defendants mediocre and contemptible.

Although the list of defendants was finalized on 29 August, as late as October, Jackson demanded the addition of new names, but was denied. Of the 24 men indicted, Martin Bormann was tried in absentia, as the Allies were unaware of his death; Krupp was too ill to stand trial; and Robert Ley had died by suicide before the start of the trial. Former Nazis were allowed to serve as counsel and by mid-November all defendants had lawyers. The defendants' lawyers jointly appealed to the court, claiming it did not have jurisdiction against the accused, but this motion was rejected. Defense lawyers saw themselves as acting on behalf of their clients and the German nation.

Initially, the Americans had planned to try fourteen organizations and their leaders, but this was narrowed to six: the Reich Cabinet, the Leadership Corps of the Nazi Party, the Gestapo, the SA, the SS and the SD, and the General Staff and High Command of the German military (Wehrmacht). The aim was to have these organizations declared criminal, so that their members could be tried expeditiously for membership in a criminal organization. Senior American officials believed that convicting organizations was a good way of showing that not just the top German leaders were responsible for crimes, without condemning the entire German people.

=== Evidence ===
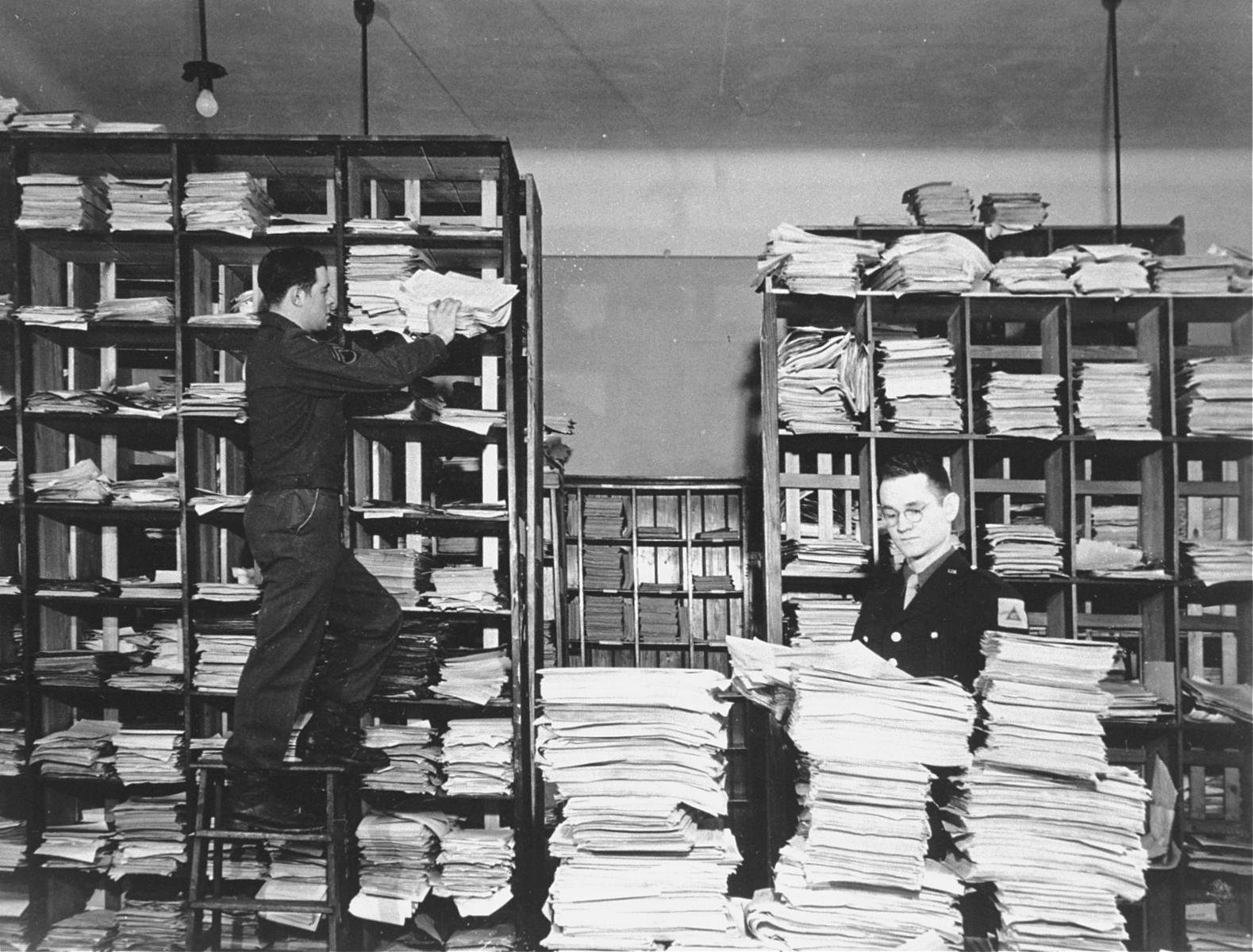
United States Army clerks with evidence

Over the summer, all of the national delegations struggled to gather evidence for the upcoming trial. The American and British prosecutors focused on documentary evidence and affidavits rather than testimony from survivors. This strategy increased the credibility of their case, since survivor testimony was considered less reliable and more vulnerable to accusations of bias, but reduced public interest in the proceedings. The American prosecution drew on reports of the Office of Strategic Services, an American intelligence agency, and information provided by the YIVO Institute for Jewish Research and the American Jewish Committee, while the French prosecution presented many documents that it had obtained from the Center of Contemporary Jewish Documentation. The prosecution called 37 witnesses compared to the defense's 83, not including 19 defendants who testified on their own behalf. The prosecution examined 110,000 captured German documents and entered 4,600 into evidence, along with 30 kilometres (19 mi) of film and 25,000 photographs.

The charter allowed the admissibility of any evidence deemed to have probative value, including depositions. Because of the loose evidentiary rules, photographs, charts, maps, and films played an important role in making incredible crimes believable. After the American prosecution submitted many documents at the beginning of the trial, the judges insisted that all of the evidence be read into the record, which slowed the trial. The structure of the charges also caused delays as the same evidence ended up being read out multiple times, when it was relevant to both conspiracy and the other charges.

== Course of the trial ==
The International Military Tribunal began trial on 20 November 1945, after postponement requests from the Soviet prosecution, who wanted more time to prepare its case, were rejected. All defendants pleaded not guilty. Jackson made clear that the trial's purpose extended beyond convicting the defendants. Prosecutors wanted to assemble irrefutable evidence of Nazi crimes, establish individual responsibility and the crime of aggression in international law, provide a history lesson to the defeated Germans, delegitimize the traditional German elite, and allow the Allies to distance themselves from appeasement. Jackson maintained that while the United States did "not seek to convict the whole German people of crime", neither did the trial "serve to absolve the whole German people except 21 men in the dock". Nevertheless, defense lawyers (although not most of the defendants) often argued that the prosecution was trying to promote German collective guilt and forcefully countered this strawman. According to Priemel, the conspiracy charge "invited apologetic interpretations: narratives of absolute, totalitarian dictatorship, run by society's lunatic fringe, of which the Germans had been the first victims rather than agents, collaborators, and fellow travellers". In contrast, the evidence presented on the Holocaust convinced some observers that Germans must have been aware of this crime while it was ongoing.

=== American and British prosecution ===
Nazi Concentration and Prison Camps (1945)

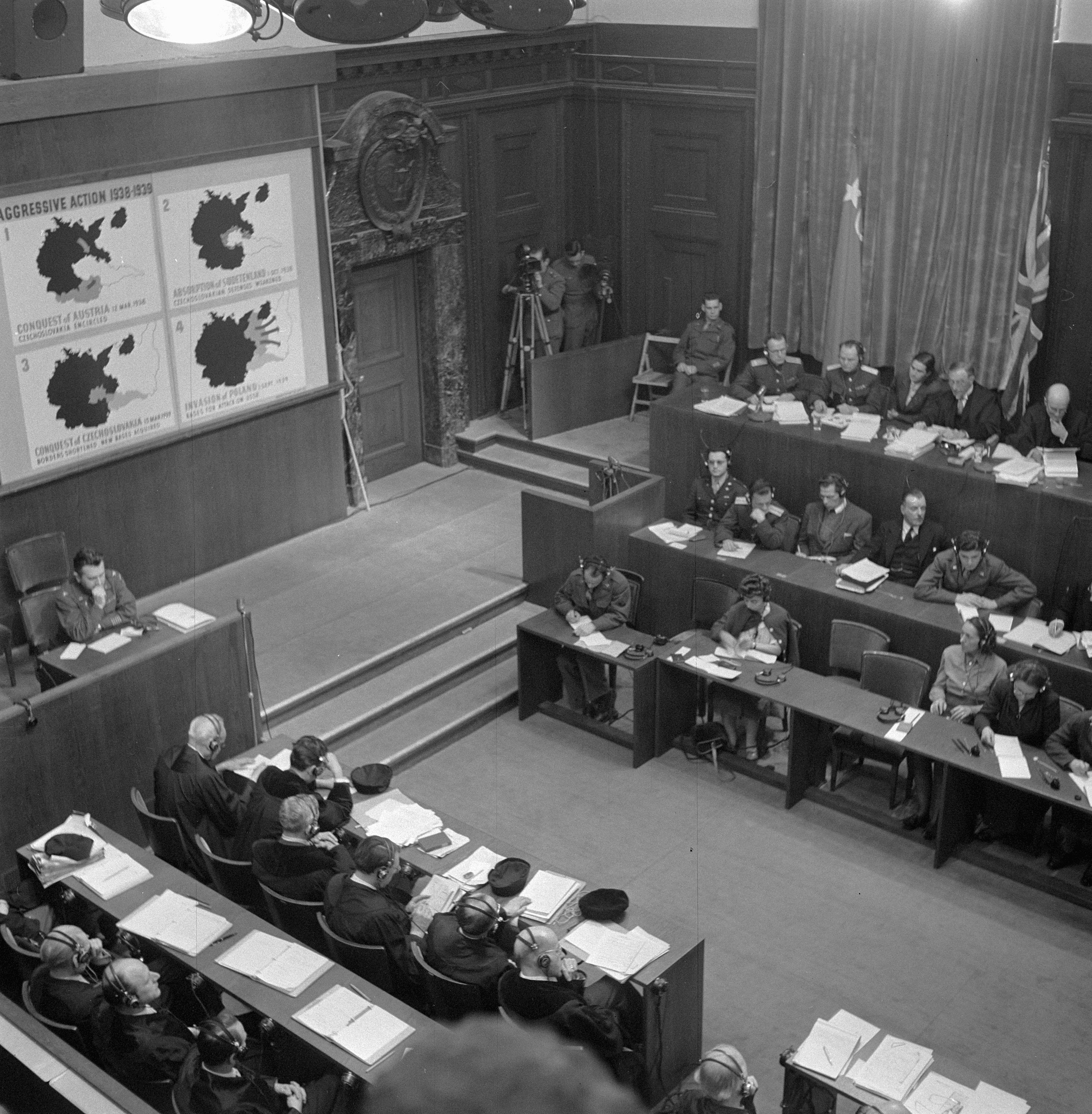
Presenting information on German aggression, 4 December

On 21 November, Jackson gave the opening speech for the prosecution. He described the fact that the defeated Nazis received a trial as "one of the most significant tributes that Power has ever paid to Reason". Focusing on aggressive war, which he described as the root of the other crimes, Jackson characterised the Nazi regime as the product of a conspiracy to seize power, transform Germany according to Nazi ideology, and then make war on the world. The speech was favorably received by the prosecution, the tribunal, the audience, historians, and even the defendants.

Much of the American case focused on the development of the Nazi conspiracy before the outbreak of war. The American prosecution became derailed during attempts to provide evidence on the first act of aggression, against Austria. On 29 November, the prosecution was unprepared to continue presenting on the invasion of Czechoslovakia, and instead screened Nazi Concentration and Prison Camps. The film, compiled from footage of the liberation of Nazi concentration camps, shocked both the defendants and the judges, who adjourned the trial. Indiscriminate selection and disorganized presentation of documentary evidence without tying it to specific defendants hampered the American prosecutors' work on the conspiracy to commit crimes against humanity. The Americans summoned Einsatzgruppen commander Otto Ohlendorf, who testified about the murder of 80,000 people by those under his command, and SS general Erich von dem Bach-Zelewski, who admitted that German anti-partisan warfare was little more than a cover for the mass murder of Jews.

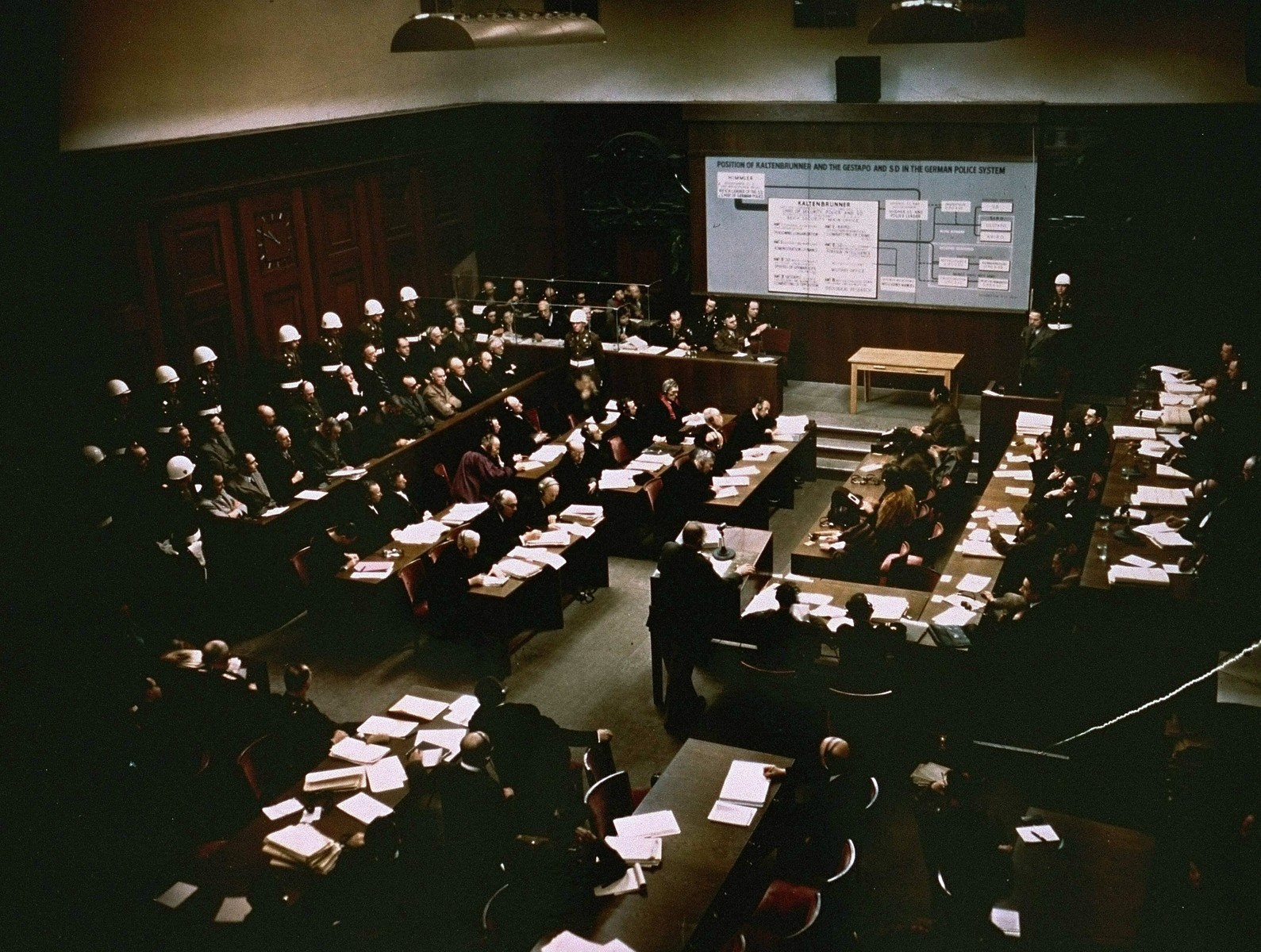
Evidence about Ernst Kaltenbrunner's crimes is presented, 2 January 1946.

The British prosecution covered the charge of crimes against peace, which was largely redundant to the American conspiracy case. On 4 December, Shawcross gave the opening speech, much of which had been written by Cambridge professor Hersch Lauterpacht. Unlike Jackson, Shawcross attempted to minimize the novelty of the aggression charges, elaborating its precursors in the conventions of Hague and Geneva, the League of Nations Covenant, the Locarno Treaty, and the Kellogg–Briand Pact. The British took four days to make their case, with Maxwell Fyfe detailing treaties broken by Germany. In mid-December the Americans switched to presenting the case against the indicted organizations, while in January both the British and Americans presented evidence against individual defendants. Besides the organizations mentioned in the indictment, American, and British prosecutors also mentioned the complicity of the German Foreign Office, army, and navy.

=== French prosecution ===
From 17 January to 7 February 1946, France presented its charges and supporting evidence. In contrast to the other prosecution teams, the French prosecution delved into Germany's development in the nineteenth century, arguing that it had diverged from the West due to pan-Germanism and imperialism. They argued that Nazi ideology, which derived from these earlier ideas, was the mens rea—criminal intent—of the crimes on trial. The French prosecutors, more than their British or American counterparts, emphasized the complicity of many Germans; they barely mentioned the charge of aggressive war and instead focused on forced labor, economic plunder, and massacres. Prosecutor Edgar Faure grouped together various German policies, such as the annexation of Alsace–Lorraine, under the label of Germanisation, which he argued was a crime against humanity. Unlike the British and American prosecution strategies, which focused on using German documents, French prosecutors took the perspective of the victims, submitting postwar police reports. Eleven witnesses, including victims of Nazi persecution, were called; resistance fighter and Auschwitz survivor Marie-Claude Vaillant-Couturier testified about crimes she had witnessed. The French charges of war crimes were accepted by the tribunal, except for the execution of hostages. Due to the narrow definition of crimes against humanity in the charter, the only part of the Germanization charges accepted by the judges was the deportation of Jews from France and other parts of Western Europe.

=== Soviet prosecution ===
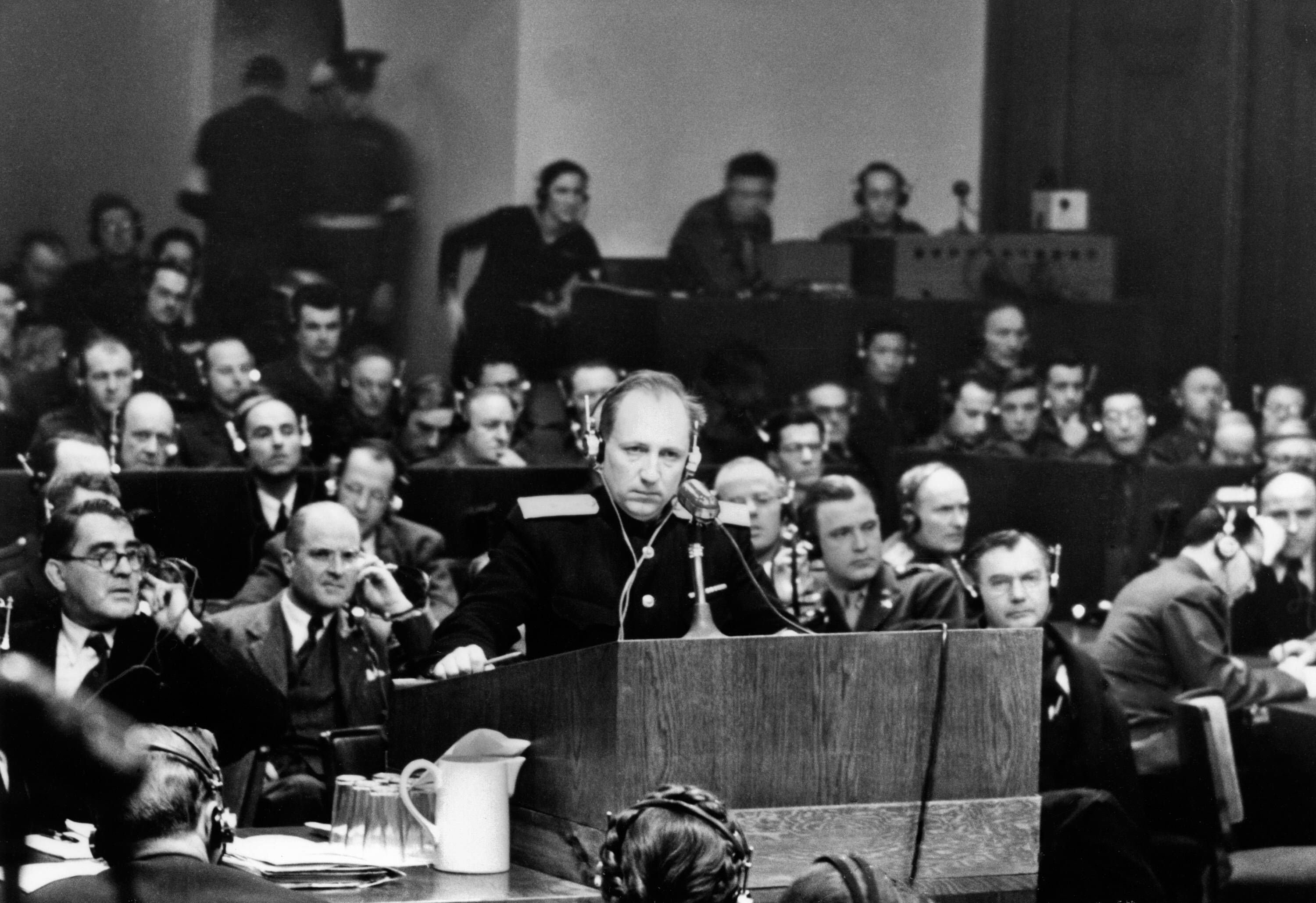
Roman Rudenko opens the Soviet case.

On 8 February, the Soviet prosecution opened its case with a speech by Rudenko that covered all four prosecution charges, highlighting a wide variety of crimes committed by the German occupiers as part of their destructive and unprovoked invasion. Rudenko tried to emphasize common ground with the other Allies while rejecting any similarity between Nazi and Soviet rule. The next week, the Soviet prosecution produced Friedrich Paulus—a German field marshal captured after the Battle of Stalingrad—as a witness and questioned him about the preparations for the invasion of the Soviet Union. Paulus incriminated his former associates, pointing to Keitel, Jodl, and Göring as the defendants most responsible for the war.

More so than other delegations, Soviet prosecutors showed the gruesome details of German atrocities, especially the death by starvation of 3 million Soviet prisoners of war and several hundred thousand residents of Leningrad. Although Soviet prosecutors dealt most extensively with the systematic murder of Jews in eastern Europe, at times they blurred the fate of Jews with that of other Soviet nationalities. Although these aspects had already been covered by the American prosecution, Soviet prosecutors introduced new evidence from Extraordinary State Commission reports and interrogations of senior enemy officers. Lev Smirnov presented evidence on the Lidice massacre in Czechoslovakia, adding that German invaders had destroyed thousands of villages and murdered their inhabitants throughout eastern Europe. The Soviet prosecution emphasized the racist aspect of policies such as the deportation of millions of civilians to Germany for forced labor, the murder of children, systematic looting of occupied territories, and theft or destruction of cultural heritage. The Soviet prosecution also attempted to fabricate German responsibility for the Katyn massacre, which had in fact been committed by the NKVD. Although Western prosecutors never publicly rejected the Katyn charge for fear of casting doubt on the entire proceedings, they were skeptical. The defense presented evidence of Soviet responsibility, and Katyn was not mentioned in the verdict.

External videos
- Atrocities Committed by the German Fascist Invaders in the USSR, 57 minutes; shown on 19 February 1946
- Testimony of Abraham Sutzkever, 27 February 1946

Inspired by the films shown by the American prosecution, the Soviet Union commissioned three films for the trial: The German Fascist Destruction of the Cultural Treasures of the Peoples of the USSR, Atrocities Committed by the German Fascist Invaders in the USSR, and The German Fascist Destruction of Soviet Cities, using footage from Soviet filmmakers as well as shots from German newsreels. The second included footage of the liberations of Majdanek and Auschwitz and was considered even more disturbing than the American concentration camp film. Soviet witnesses included several survivors of German crimes, including two civilians who lived through the siege of Leningrad, a peasant whose village was destroyed in anti-partisan warfare, a Red Army doctor who endured several prisoner-of-war camps and two Holocaust survivors—Samuel Rajzman, a survivor of Treblinka extermination camp, and poet Abraham Sutzkever, who described the murder of tens of thousands of Jews from Vilna. The Soviet prosecution case was generally well received and presented compelling evidence for the suffering of the Soviet people and the Soviet contributions to victory.

=== Defense ===
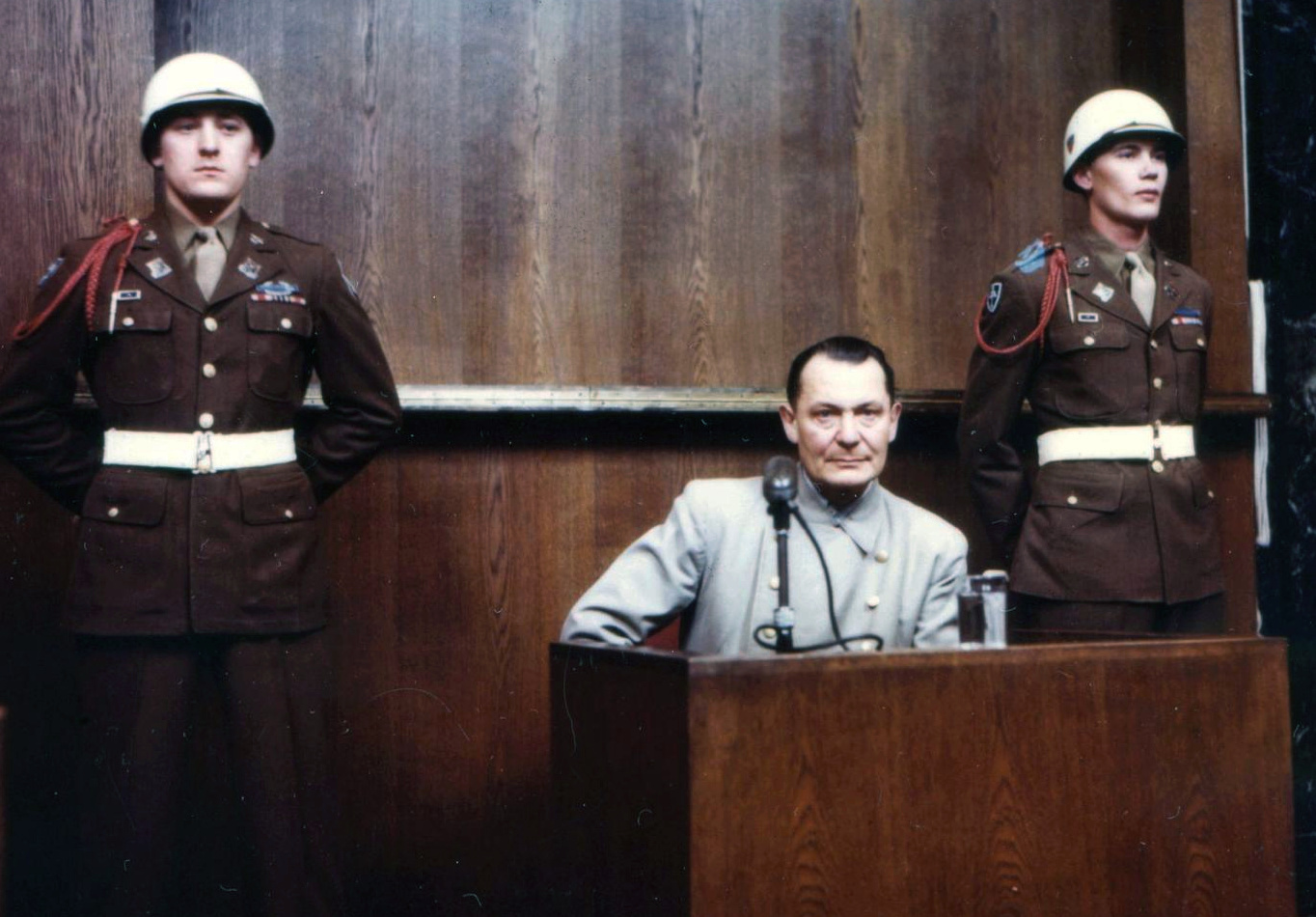
Hermann Göring under cross-examination

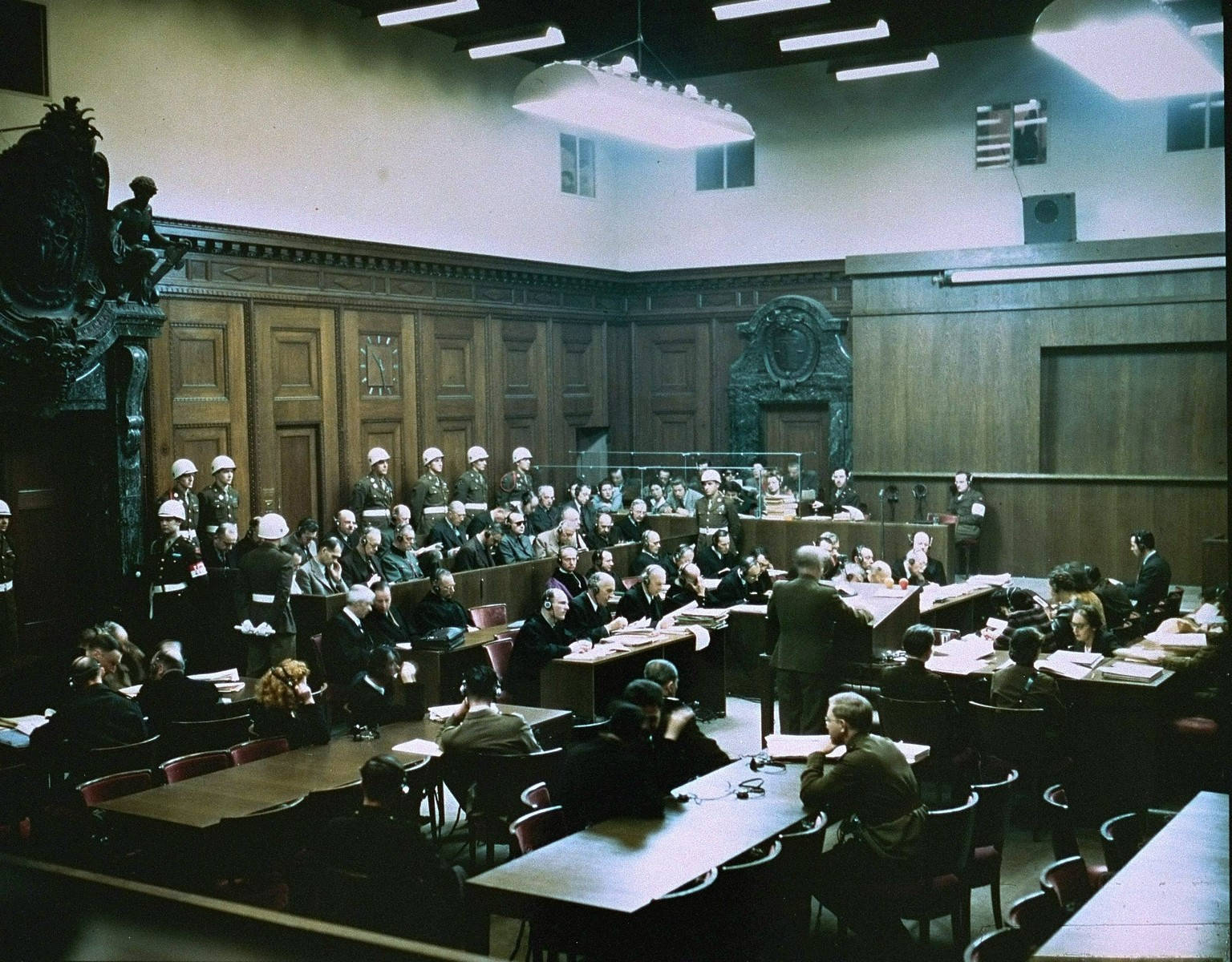
A member of the Soviet delegation addresses the tribunal.

From March to July 1946, the defense presented its counterarguments. Before the prosecution finished, it was clear that their general case was proven, but it remained to determine the individual guilt of each defendant. None of the defendants tried to assert that the Nazis' crimes had not occurred. Some defendants denied involvement in certain crimes or implausibly claimed ignorance of them, especially the Holocaust. A few defense lawyers inverted the arguments of the prosecution to assert that the Germans' authoritarian mindset and obedience to the state exonerated them from any personal guilt. Most rejected that Germany had deviated from Western civilization, arguing that few Germans could have supported Hitler because Germany was a civilized country.

The defendants tried to blame their crimes on Hitler, who was mentioned 12,000 times during the trial—more than the top five defendants combined. Other absent and dead men, including Himmler, Reinhard Heydrich, Adolf Eichmann, and Bormann, were also blamed. To counter claims that conservative defendants had enabled the Nazi rise to power, defense lawyers blamed the Social Democratic Party of Germany, trade unions, and other countries that maintained diplomatic relations with Germany. In contrast, most defendants avoided incriminating each other. Most defendants argued their own insignificance within the Nazi system, though Göring took the opposite approach, expecting to be executed but vindicated in the eyes of the German people.

The charter did not recognize a tu quoque defense—asking for exoneration on the grounds that the Allies had committed the same crimes with which the defendants were charged. Although defense lawyers repeatedly equated the Nuremberg Laws to legislation found in other countries, Nazi concentration camps to Allied detention facilities, and the deportation of Jews to the expulsion of Germans, the judges rejected their arguments. Alfred Seidl repeatedly tried to disclose the secret protocols of the German–Soviet pact; although he was eventually successful, it was legally irrelevant and the judges rejected his attempt to bring up the Treaty of Versailles. Six defendants were charged with the German invasion of Norway, and their lawyers argued that this invasion was undertaken to prevent a British invasion of that country; a cover-up prevented the defense from capitalizing on this argument. Fleet admiral Chester W. Nimitz testified that the United States Navy had also used unrestricted submarine warfare against Japan in the Pacific; Dönitz's counsel successfully argued that this meant that it could not be a crime. The judges barred most evidence on Allied misdeeds from being heard in court.

Many defense lawyers complained about various aspects of the trial procedure and attempted to discredit the entire proceedings. In order to appease them, the defendants were allowed a free hand with their witnesses and a great deal of irrelevant testimony was heard. The defendants' witnesses sometimes managed to exculpate them, but other witnesses—including Rudolf Höss, the former commandant of Auschwitz, and Hans Bernd Gisevius, a member of the German resistance—bolstered the prosecution's case. In the context of the brewing Cold War—for example, in early March 1946, Winston Churchill delivered the Iron Curtain speech—the trial became a means of condemning not only Germany but also the Soviet Union.

=== Closing ===
On 31 August, closing arguments were presented. Over the course of the trial, crimes against humanity and especially against Jews (who were mentioned as victims of Nazi atrocities far more than any other group) came to upstage the aggressive war charge. In contrast to the opening prosecution statements, all eight closing statements highlighted the Holocaust. The French and British prosecutors made this the main charge, as opposed to that of aggression. All prosecutors except the Americans mentioned the concept of genocide, which had been recently invented by the Polish-Jewish jurist Raphael Lemkin. British prosecutor Shawcross quoted from witness testimony about a murdered Jewish family from Dubno, Ukraine. During the closing statements, most defendants disappointed the judges with lies and denials. Speer managed to give the impression of apologizing without assuming personal guilt or naming any victims other than the German people. On 2 September, the court recessed, and the judges retreated into seclusion to decide the verdict and sentences, which had been under discussion since June. The verdict was drafted by British deputy judge Norman Birkett. All eight judges participated in the deliberations, but the deputies could not vote.

== Verdict ==
The International Military Tribunal agreed with the prosecution that aggression was the gravest charge, stating in its judgment that because "war is essentially an evil thing", "to initiate a war of aggression, therefore, is not only an international crime; it is the supreme international crime differing only from other war crimes in that it contains within itself the accumulated evil of the whole". The work of the judges was made more difficult due to the broadness of the crimes listed in the Nuremberg Charter. The judges did not attempt to define the crime of aggression and did not mention the retroactivity of the charges in the verdict. Despite the lingering doubts of some of the judges, the official interpretation of the IMT held that all of the charges had a solid basis in customary international law and that the trial was procedurally fair. The judges were aware that both the Allies and the Axis had planned or committed acts of aggression, writing the verdict carefully to avoid discrediting either the Allied governments or the tribunal.

The judges ruled that there had been a premeditated conspiracy to commit crimes against peace, whose goals were "the disruption of the European order" and "the creation of a Greater Germany beyond the frontiers of 1914". Contrary to Jackson's argument that the conspiracy began with the founding of the Nazi Party in 1920, the verdict dated the planning of aggression to the 1937 Hossbach Memorandum. The conspiracy charge caused significant dissent on the bench; Donnedieu de Vabres wanted to scrap it. Through a compromise proposed by the British judges, the charge of conspiracy was narrowed to a conspiracy to wage aggressive war. Only eight defendants were convicted on that charge, all of whom were also found guilty of crimes against peace. All 22 defendants were charged with crimes against peace, and 12 were convicted. The war crimes and crimes against humanity charges held up the best, with only two defendants charged on those grounds being acquitted. The judges determined that crimes against humanity concerning German Jews before 1939 were not under the court's jurisdiction because the prosecution had not proven a connection to aggressive war.

Newsreel of the sentencing

Four organizations were ruled to be criminal: the Leadership Corps of the Nazi Party, the SS, the Gestapo, and the SD, although some lower ranks and subgroups were excluded. The verdict only allowed for individual criminal responsibility if willing membership and knowledge of the criminal purpose could be proved, complicating denazification efforts. The SA, Reich Cabinet, General Staff and High Command were not ruled to be criminal organizations. Although the Wehrmacht leadership was not considered an organization within the meaning of the charter, misrepresentation of the verdict as an exoneration would become one of the foundations of the Clean Wehrmacht myth. The trial had nevertheless resulted in the coverage of its systematic criminality in the German press.

Sentences were debated at length by the judges. Twelve defendants were sentenced to death: Göring, Ribbentrop, Keitel, Kaltenbrunner, Rosenberg, Frank, Frick, Streicher, Sauckel, Jodl, Seyss-Inquart, and Bormann. On 16 October, ten were hanged, with Göring killing himself the day before. Seven defendants (Hess, Funk, Raeder, Dönitz, Schirach, Speer, and Neurath) were sent to Spandau Prison to serve their sentences. All three acquittals (Papen, Schacht, and Fritzsche) were based on a deadlock between the judges; these acquittals surprised observers. Despite being accused of the same crimes, Sauckel was sentenced to death, while Speer was given a prison sentence because the judges considered that he could reform. Nikichenko released a dissent approved by Moscow that rejected all the acquittals, called for a death sentence for Hess, and convicted all the organizations.

== Subsequent Nuremberg trials ==
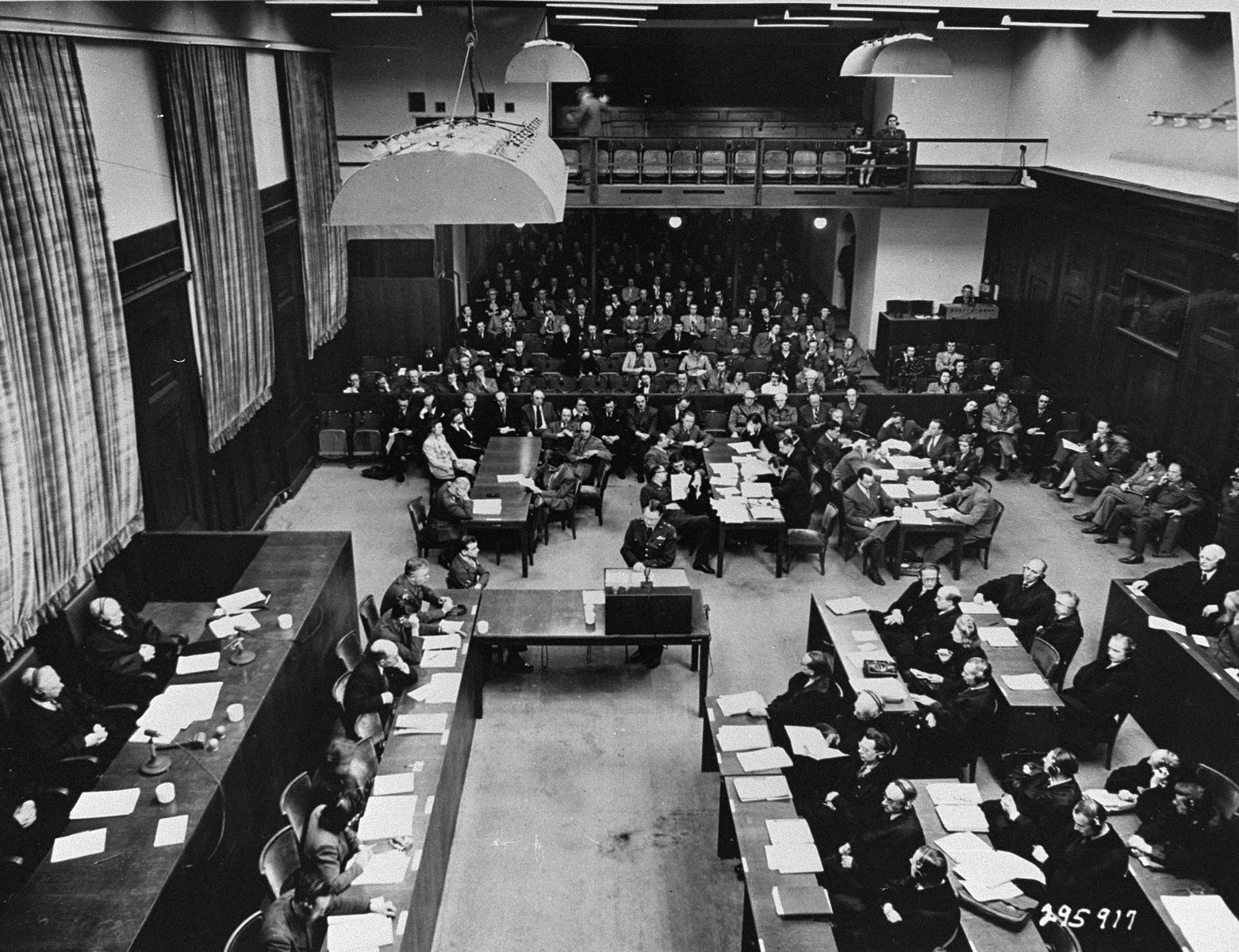
Telford Taylor opens for the prosecution in the Ministries Trial, 6 January 1948.

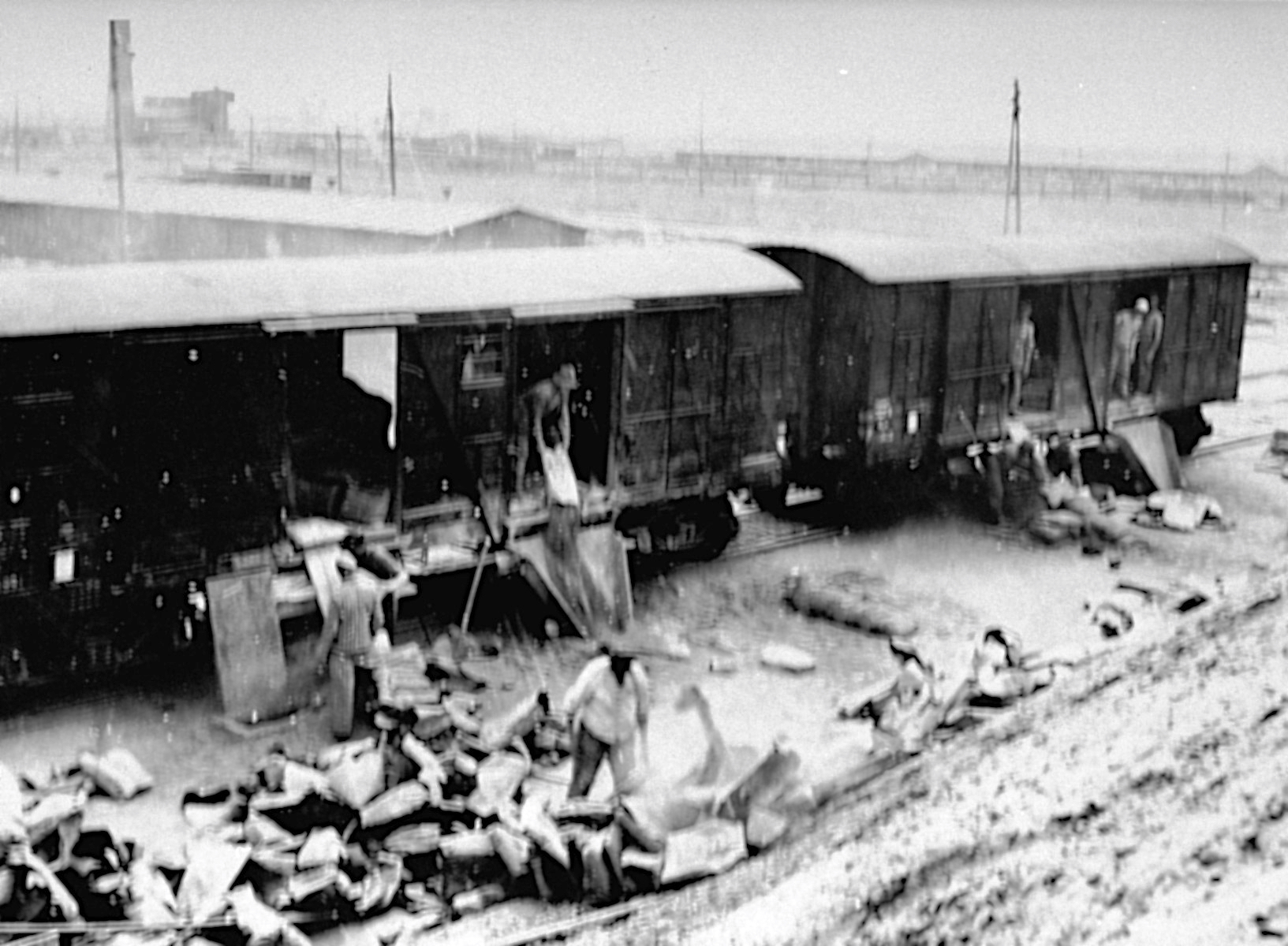
Monowitz prisoners unload cement from trains for IG Farben, presented as evidence at the IG Farben Trial.

Initially, it was planned to hold a second international tribunal for German industrialists, but this was never held because of differences between the Allies. Twelve military trials were convened solely by the United States in the same courtroom that had hosted the International Military Tribunal. Pursuant to Law No. 10 adopted by the Allied Control Council, United States forces arrested almost 100,000 Germans as war criminals. The Office of Chief Counsel for War Crimes identified 2,500 major war criminals, of whom 177 were tried. Many of the worst offenders were not prosecuted, for logistical or financial reasons.

One set of trials focused on the actions of German professionals: the Doctors' Trial focused on human experimentation and euthanasia murders, the Judges' Trial on the role of the judiciary in Nazi crimes, and the Ministries Trial on the culpability of bureaucrats of German government ministries, especially the Foreign Office. Also on trial were industrialists—in the Flick trial, the IG Farben trial, and the Krupp trial—for using forced labor, looting property from Nazi victims, and funding SS atrocities.

Members of the SS were tried in the Pohl trial, which focused on members of the SS Main Economic and Administrative Office that oversaw SS economic activity, including the Nazi concentration camps; the RuSHA trial of Nazi racial policies; and the Einsatzgruppen trial, in which members of the mobile killing squads were tried for the murder of more than one million people behind the Eastern Front. Luftwaffe general Erhard Milch was tried for using slave labor and deporting civilians. In the Hostages case, several generals were tried for executing thousands of hostages and prisoners of war, looting, using forced labor, and deporting civilians in the Balkans. Other generals were tried in the High Command Trial for plotting wars of aggression, issuing criminal orders, deporting civilians, using slave labor, and looting in the Soviet Union.

These trials emphasized the crimes committed during the Holocaust. The trials heard 1,300 witnesses, entered more than 30,000 documents into evidence, and generated 132,855 pages of transcripts, with the judgments totaling 3,828 pages. Of 177 defendants, 142 were convicted and 25 sentenced to death; the severity of sentencing was related to the defendant's proximity to mass murder. Legal historian Kevin Jon Heller argues that the trials' greatest achievement was "their inestimable contribution to the form and substance of international criminal law", which had been left underdeveloped by the IMT.

== Contemporary reactions ==
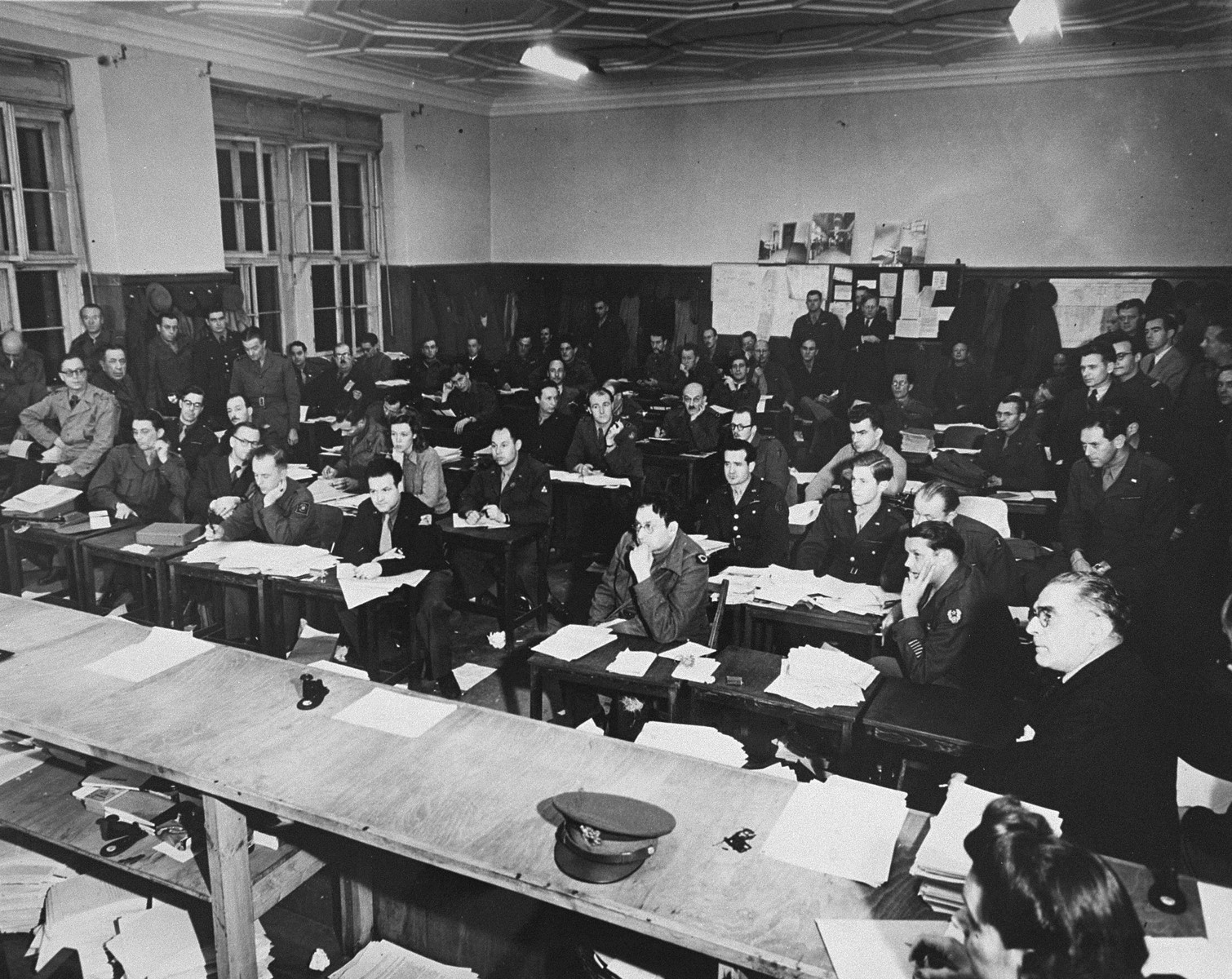
Press at the International Military Tribunal

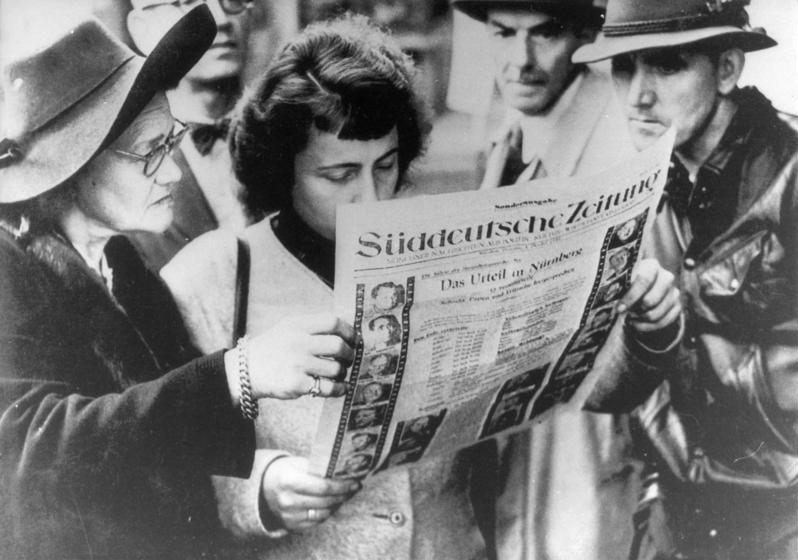
Germans read Süddeutsche Zeitung reporting the verdict, 1 October 1946

In all, 249 journalists were accredited to cover the IMT and 61,854 visitor tickets were issued. In France, the sentence for Rudolf Hess and acquittal of organizations were met with outrage from the media and especially from organizations for deportees and resistance fighters, as they were perceived as too lenient. In the United Kingdom, although a variety of responses were reported, it was difficult to sustain interest in a long trial. Where the prosecution was disappointed by some of the verdicts, the defense could take satisfaction.

Many Germans at the time of the trials focused on finding food and shelter. Despite this, a majority read press reports about the trial. In a 1946 poll, 78 percent of Germans assessed the trial as fair, but four years later that had fallen to 38 percent, with 30 percent considering it unfair. As time went on, more Germans considered the trials illegitimate victor's justice and an imposition of collective guilt, which they rejected—instead considering themselves victims of the war. As the Cold War began, the rapidly changing political environment began to affect the effectiveness of the trials. The educational purpose of the Nuremberg Military Tribunals was a failure, in part because of the resistance to war crimes trials in German society, but also because of the United States Army's refusal to publish the trial record in German for fear it would undermine the fight against communism.

The German churches, both Catholic and Protestant, were vocal proponents of amnesty. The pardon of convicted war criminals also had cross-party support in West Germany, which was established in 1949. The Americans satisfied these wishes to bind West Germany to the Western Bloc, beginning early releases of Nuremberg Military Tribunal convicts in 1949. In 1951, High Commissioner John J. McCloy overturned most of the sentences and the last three prisoners, all convicted at the Einsatzgruppen trial, were released in 1958. The German public took the early releases as confirmation of what they saw as the illegitimacy of the trials. The IMT defendants required Soviet permission for release; Speer was not successful in obtaining early release, and Hess remained in prison until his death in 1987. By the late 1950s, the West German consensus on release began to erode, due to greater openness in political culture and new revelations of Nazi criminality, including the first trials of Nazi perpetrators in West German courts.

== Legacy ==
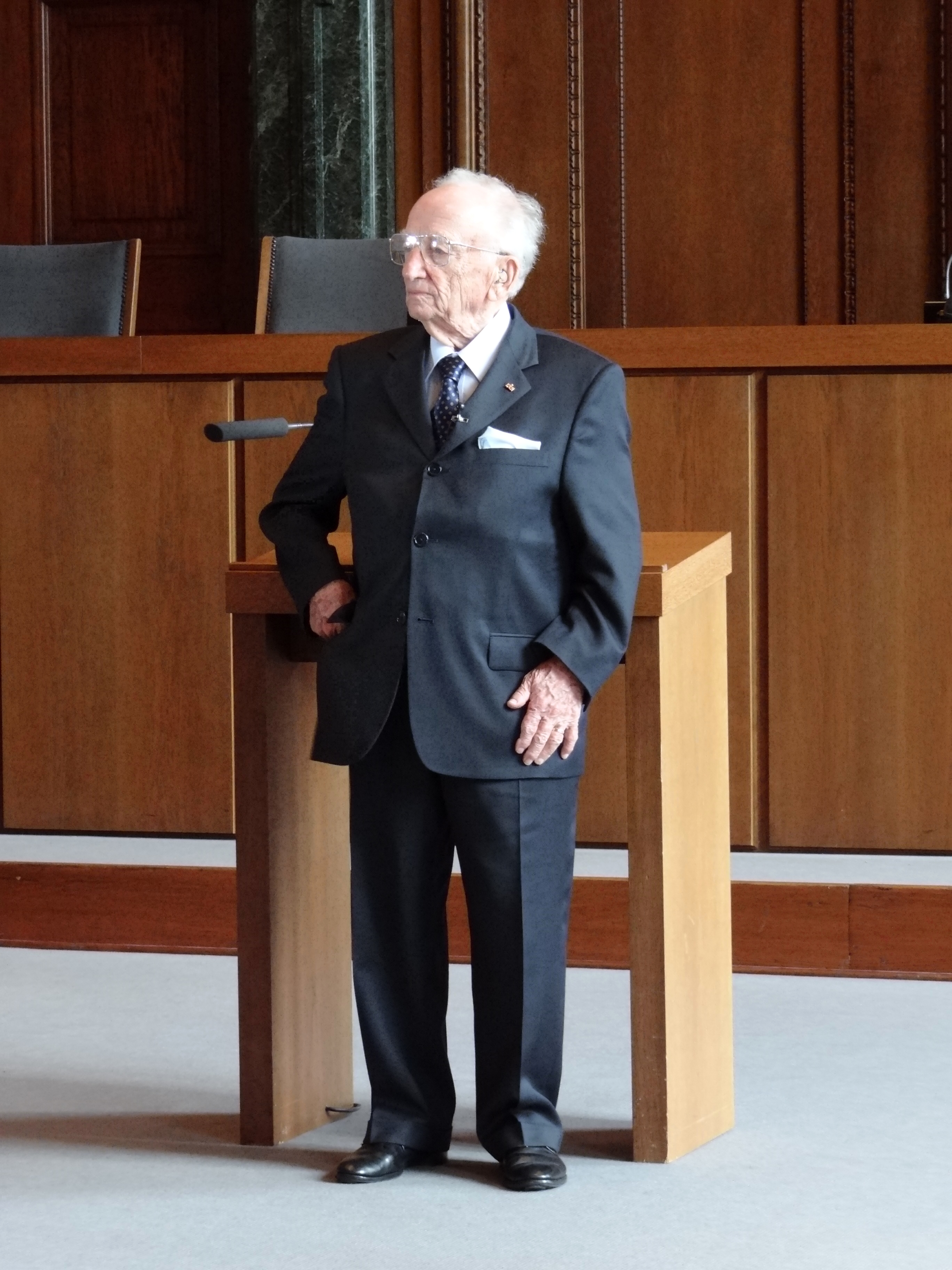
Benjamin Ferencz, chief prosecutor of the Einsatzgruppen trial, in the Palace of Justice courtroom, 2012

The International Military Tribunal, and its charter, "marked the true beginning of international criminal law". The trial has met a mixed reception ranging from glorification to condemnation. The reaction was initially predominantly negative, but has become more positive over time.

The selective prosecution exclusively of the defeated Axis and hypocrisy of all four Allied powers has garnered the most persistent criticism. Such actions as the German–Soviet pact, the expulsion of millions of Germans from central and eastern Europe, deportation of civilians for forced labor, and violent suppression of anti-colonial uprisings would have been deemed illegal according to the definitions of international crimes in the Nuremberg charter.

Another major controversy resulted from trying defendants for acts that were not criminal at the time, particularly crimes against peace. Equally novel but less controversial were crimes against humanity, the conspiracy charge, and criminal penalties on individuals for breaches of international law. Besides these criticisms, the trials have been taken to task for the distortion that comes from fitting historical events into legal categories.

The International Military Tribunal for the Far East (Tokyo Trial) borrowed many of its ideas from the IMT, including all four charges, and was intended by the Truman Administration to shore up the IMT's legal legacy. On 11 December 1946, the United Nations General Assembly unanimously passed a resolution affirming "the principles of international law recognized by the Charter of the Nuremberg Tribunal and the judgment of the Tribunal". In 1950, the International Law Commission drafted the Nuremberg principles to codify international criminal law, although the Cold War prevented the adoption of these principles until the 1990s. The 1948 Genocide Convention was much more restricted than Lemkin's original concept and its effectiveness was further limited by Cold War politics.

In the 1990s, a revival of international criminal law included the establishment of ad hoc international criminal tribunals for Yugoslavia (ICTY) and Rwanda (ICTR), which were widely viewed as part of the legacy of the Nuremberg and Tokyo trials. A permanent International Criminal Court (ICC), proposed in 1953, was established in 2002.

The trials were the first use of simultaneous interpretation, which stimulated technical advances in translation methods. The Palace of Justice houses a museum on the trial and the courtroom became a tourist attraction, drawing 13,138 visitors in 2005. The IMT is one of the most well-studied trials in history, and it has also been the subject of an abundance of books and scholarly publications, along with motion pictures such as Judgment at Nuremberg (1961), The Memory of Justice (1976), Nuremberg (2000) and Nuremberg (2025).
