= Donnadieu =

Donnadieu is a surname. Notable people with the surname include:

- Bernard-Pierre Donnadieu (1949–2010), French actor
- Henri Donnadieu (1943–2025), French born Mexican LGBTQ activist and businessman
- Marguerite Donnadieu, better known as Marguerite Duras (1914–1996), French writer
