= Emil Stanisław Rappaport =

Polish lawyer (1877–1965)

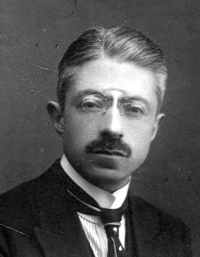
- Emil Rappaport, circa 1919
- Born: 8 July 1877; Warsaw, Poland
- Died: 10 August 1965 (aged 88); Łódź, Poland
- Occupation: Judge
- Known for: member of the Supreme National Tribunal
- Awards: Order of Polonia Restituta

Emil Stanisław Rappaport (8 July 1877 – 10 August 1965) was a Polish lawyer of Jewish descent. He was a specialist in criminal law and a founder of the doctrine of international criminal law. In 1930, he was awarded the Order of Polonia Restituta Commander's Cross with Star, Poland's second highest civilian state award. He was the son of Feliks Rappaport and Justyna Bauerertz.

== Education ==
From 1897-1901 he studied law at the Russian Imperial University of Warsaw. In 1910 he received a Doctor of Law degree at the University of Neuchâtel in Switzerland.

== Academic career ==
Starting in 1919 he was a member of the Codification Committee, one of the founders of International Association of Penal Law (L'Association Internationale de Droit Penal), serving as its vice-chairman between 1924 and 1939. He proposed that not only aggressive war, but also the propaganda for aggressive war should be considered an international crime.

He was co-founder and member of the Senate at Free Polish University, and a professor of criminal policy. In the years 1920-1932, as an assistant professor, Rappaport taught criminal law at the University of Lviv. In 1948 he was appointed as full professor at the University of Łódź.

== Judicial career ==
From 1917 to 1919 he was an appellate court judge in Warsaw, and from 1919 to 1951, he was a judge of the Supreme Court of the Republic of Poland.

== War years ==
In the period of the German occupation, he was arrested by the Gestapo and held prisoner for almost one year in Pawiak and Mokotow Prison; he was held under the charge of miscarriage of justice of citizens of German nationality.

== After 1945 ==
Under the pseudonym of Stanislaw Barycz, he wrote as a journalist for various magazines. His book, The Criminal Nation: Offenses of Nazism and the German nation, consisted of extensive characterization of the ideology and social policy of Nazism, after which followed the proposals of the German nation's punishment for its crimes. He was aware that his ideas were radical and may raise doubts. He opted for a penalty consistent with the guilt of the accused. He pointed to the criminal nature of the German nation. He noted that, regardless of the personal activities of members of the criminal organization subject to punishment, democratic societies also punish perpetrators of offenses committed unintentionally, if not opposed to the consequences of their actions. Those who silently accept crime also partake. He consented to the absolute displacement of Germans from the area of the new Polish territories but he also proposed action to destroy German industry, making the transformation of the occupied country into a peaceful agrarian society. He reasoned that for this purpose the number of Germans should be reduced, by expelling them. It is significant that he recognized Austrians as innocent and even believed that a peaceful revival of German culture would come from their country. His views reflected the thinking of the time, popular with both average people and some intellectuals, greatly affected by memories of the war that just ended.

He was an opponent of the death penalty.

In June 1946, Rappaport was appointed as the member of the Supreme National Tribunal. He retired in 1960.

== Publications ==
- Rappaport, E. S. (1911). "La loi de pardon : étude analytique des projets français". Recueil Sirey. Neuchâtel: Attinger Frères.
- Rappaport, E. S. (1918). "Rys zasad prawa karnego międzynarodowego". Theory of the international criminal law. Warszawa.
- Rappaport, Emil (1925–1939). Expose sommaire des travaux legislatifs de la Diete et du Senat Polonais. Warsaw.
- Rappaport, Emil; Pella, Vespasien; Potulicki, Michał (1929). I. Conférence internationale d'unification du droit pénal (Varsovie, 1er-5 novembre 1927). Paris: Recueil Sirey.
- Rappaport, E. S. (1929). "Zagadnienie unifikacji międzynarodowej prawa karnego". Unification of international criminal law. Warszawa.
- Rappaport, E. S. (1930). "Zagadnienie prawa karnego miedzypaństwowego". Inter-state international criminal law. Warszawa.
- Jamontt, Janusz; Lemkin, Raphael; Rappaport, Stanisław Emil (1932). "Kodeks Karny r. 1932". Penal Code 1932. Warsaw: Bibljoteka Prawnicza.
- Rappaport, E. S. (1945). "Naród - Zbrodniarz. Przestępstwa hitleryzmu a naród niemiecki. Szkic analityczny przestępczości i odpowiedzialności osobowo-zespołowej.". Nation - Criminal. Offences of the Nazism and the German nation. Analytical sketch of crime and the personal-collective responsibility. Łódź: Spółdzielnia Dziennikarska "Prasa".
