= Robert Falco =

French judge (1882–1960)

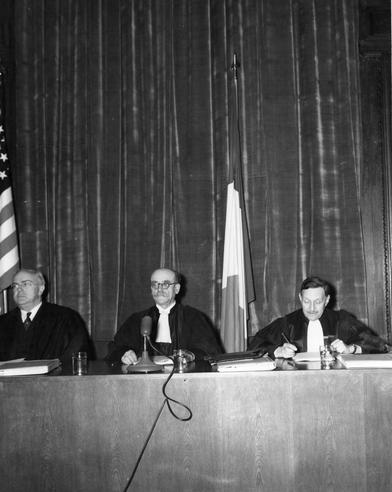
Left to right: John J. Parker (USA), Henri Donnedieu de Vabres and Robert Falco (France)

Robert Falco (26 February 1882 – 14 January 1960) was a French judge at the Nuremberg trials, who later sat in the Cour de Cassation.

== Biography ==
Falco was born in Paris into a Jewish family. His great-grandfather was decorated by Louis Philippe in 1831, and his maternal grandfather Alfred-Philibert Aldrophe worked as an architect for Leopold II of Belgium and Gustave de Rothschild. His father fought in the Franco-Prussian War of 1870/71, for which he was made a member of the Légion d'honneur, and later became the President of the Paris commercial court.

After the end of his legal studies Falco worked from 1903 as a barrister. In 1907 he gained his doctorate with a work on the Duties and Rights of Theatre Audiences and then worked as a judge at the court of chancery, but continued to plead until 1919.

He was later appointed to the Paris Court of Appeal. He was dismissed from this post in 1940 because of his Jewish origin.

An agreement in English, French and Russian to prosecute war criminals signed by Mr. Falco

During the preparation of the Nuremberg Trials in June 1945 in London at the International Conference on Military Trials he represented France together with André Gros, professor of international law, and was one of the main authors of the London Charter of the International Military Tribunal, defining the procedures and protocols observed during the Nuremberg Trials, where he was one of the two French judges, as the alternative to Henri Donnedieu de Vabres.

On the basis of his work during the trials he was elected an Honorary Bencher of Gray's Inn in 1946.

In 1947 Falco was reinstated in the French judiciary, at the Cour de Cassation.

He was awarded the Croix de Guerre and made a Commander of the Légion d'honneur. He died in Paris in 1960.

== Memoirs ==
During the year he spent in Nuremberg, Falco kept notes which he later used in his memoirs of the trials. These memoirs remained unpublished for decades, but, illustrated with sketches by Jeanne Falco, the judge's second wife, who accompanied him throughout the trials, was published in September 2012 under the title Juge à Nuremberg by Editions Arbre bleu , with a preface by the historian Annette Wieviorka and an introduction by Guillaume Mouralis, an historian specialising in the history of international penal justice.

== Sources and external links ==
- DER AUGENZEUGE Falco als Richter in Nürnberg (in German)
- Courdecassation.fr Short biography (in French)
