= Paris Institute of Criminology and Criminal Law =

Tertiary education institution in France

- Institut de criminologie de Paris
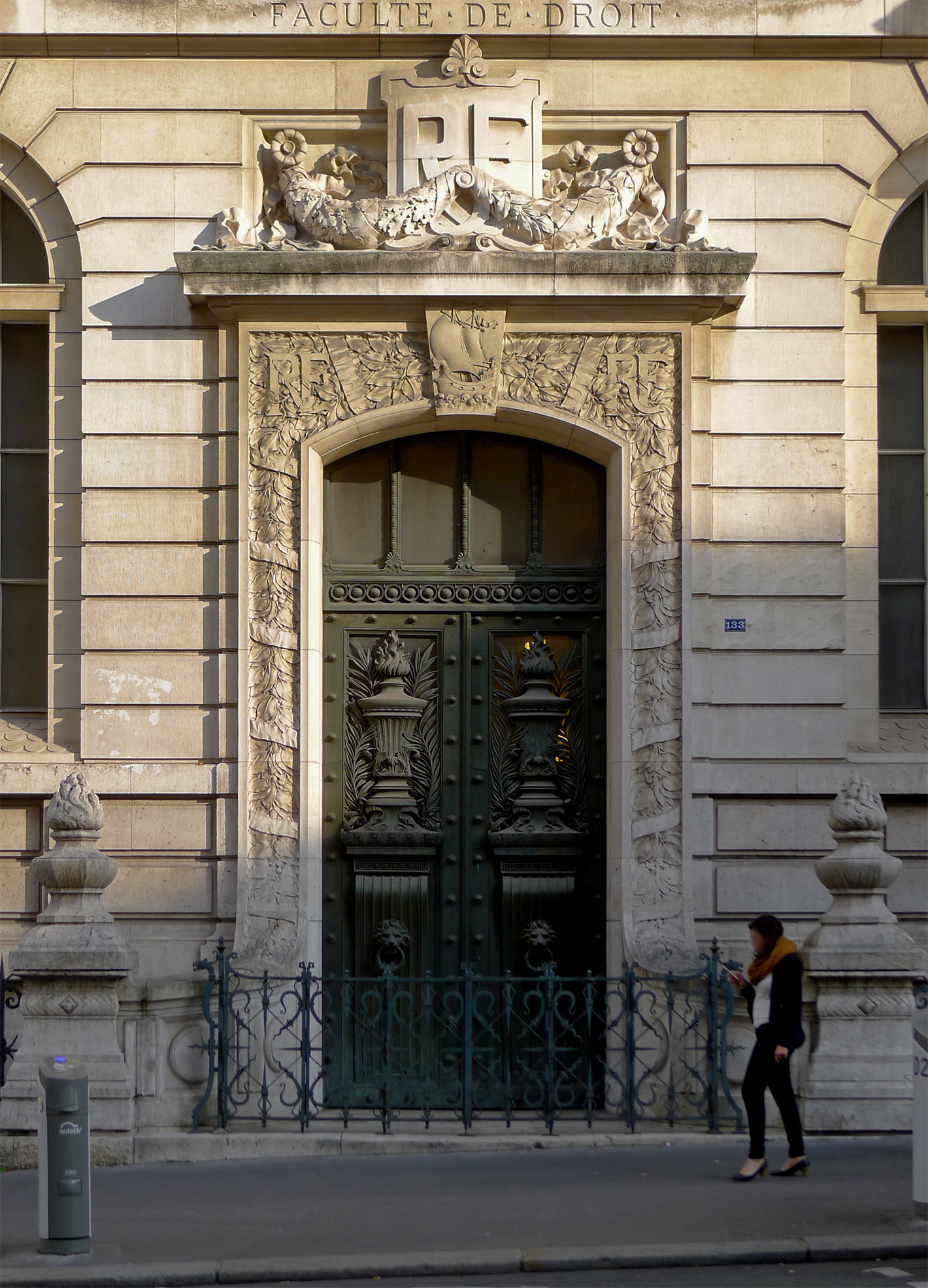
- Established: 1922
- Affiliations: Panthéon-Assas University
- Director: Philippe Conte
- Location: Paris, France

The Paris Institute of Criminology and Criminal Law (ICP) (French: Institut de criminologie de Paris) is the oldest French research institute for criminal law and criminology. Founded in 1922 as a component of the Faculty of Law of Paris, it has since been transferred to Paris-Panthéon-Assas University. It is also part of the International Center for Sociological Penal and Penitentiary Research and Studies of Messina, Italy.

The Institute of Criminology is dedicated to the study of crime and criminal behavior, with a focus on developing policies and strategies to prevent crime and ensure public safety.

The Institute offers a range of programs for students at both the undergraduate and graduate levels.

== Notable people ==
- Émile Garçon
- Henri Donnedieu de Vabres
- Adeline Hazan
