= War crimes trials after World War I =

War crimes trials after World War I include:

- Leipzig war crimes trials, held in 1921 to try alleged German war criminals
- Prosecution of Ottoman war criminals after World War I, taken up by the Paris Peace Conference (1919) and ultimately included in the Treaty of Sèvres (1920)
  - Istanbul trials of 1919–1920
  - Malta exiles, purges of Ottoman intellectuals by the Allied forces
