= Henri Donnedieu de Vabres =

French jurist (1880–1952)

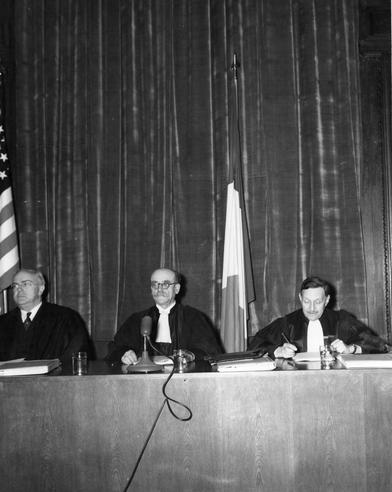
From left to right: Parker, Donnedieu, and Falco in 1945

Henri Donnedieu de Vabres (French pronunciation: [ɑ̃ʁi dɔndjø də vabʁ]; 8 July 1880 – 14 February 1952) was a French jurist who took part in the Nuremberg trials after World War II and a president of the AIDP. He was the primary French judge during the proceedings, with Robert Falco as his alternate.

== Biography ==
Donnedieu was born in Nîmes to a Protestant and bourgeois family. Prior to the war, he had campaigned for the concept of an International Criminal Court while serving as a professor of criminal law at the University of Paris. He continued to serve as a law professor in Vichy France. He also became director of the Paris Institute of Criminology. Later in 1947, he would again submit his idea before the United Nations' Committee on the Progressive Development of International Law and its Codification.

In 1935 Donnedieu accepted an invitation to Berlin from Hans Frank, Hitler's personal lawyer and later Governor-General of occupied Poland. They debated the idea of an international criminal court. Frank was later one of the accused tried at Nuremberg, convicted, and sentenced to death.

Donnedieu was the only one of the trial judges who was not a professional judge; this is likely because judges under the Vichy regime would have had to swear allegiance to the regime, whereas Donnedieu as a professor did not. During the trials, Donnedieu was noted for protesting against the charges of Conspiracy to Wage War as he felt it was too broad to be served in such a monumental trial. As a corollary of this view, he strongly protested against the conviction of Colonel-General Alfred Jodl, stating that it was a miscarriage of justice for the professional soldier to be convicted – when he held no allegiance to Nazism. Jodl was later exonerated posthumously by a German court, citing Donnedieu's statement. On 28 February 1953, a West German denazification court declared Jodl not guilty of breaking international law. This not guilty declaration was revoked on 3 September 1953, by the Minister of Political Liberation for Bavaria. His trial secretary was Yves Beigbeder.

Donnedieu was also the one to suggest that a firing squad might be a more honourable way to execute those found guilty – though that was strongly contested by Francis Biddle and Iona Nikitchenko.

Along with Raphael Lemkin (the academic who devised the term "genocide" in his 1944 book Axis Rule in Occupied Europe) and Vespasian V. Pella, he was consulted by John Peters Humphrey to prepare the United Nations Secretariat Draft for the Convention on the Prevention of Genocide.

Donnedieu died in Paris in 1952.

Donnedieu's son, Jean Donnedieu de Vabres, joined Charles de Gaulle's government early and served as his chargé de mission in his cabinet from 1944 to 1946. His grandson Renaud Donnedieu de Vabres served as France's Minister of Culture from 2004 to 2007.
