= International Association of Penal Law =

Lawyers association

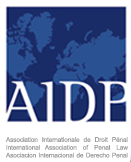
Logo of Association Internationale de Droit Penal (AIDP)

The International Association of Penal Law (AIDP) (French: L'Association Internationale de Droit Penal) was founded in Paris on March 14, 1924. It emerged from a reorganization of the International Union of Penal Law (UIDP), founded in Vienna in 1889 by three prominent lawyers - specialists of the criminal law: Franz von Liszt, Gerard Van Hamel and Adolphe Prins, which was dissolved after the First World War.

Before 1939, the leading figures of the Association were Vespasien Pella from Romania, Henri Donnedieu de Vabres and Jean-Andre Roux from France, Henri Carton de Wiart from Belgium, Megalos Caloyanni from Greece and Emil Stanisław Rappaport from Poland

The AIDP is the oldest global organization bringing together specialists of the criminal law and one of the oldest scientific societies in the world.
