= Iona Nikitchenko =

Soviet judge (1895–1967)

- Иона Никитченко
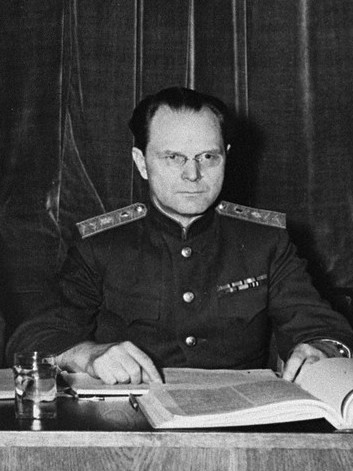
- Nikitchenko at the Nuremberg trials

Member of the Supreme Court of the Soviet Union
- In office September 1938 – September 1951

Personal details
- Born: 28 June 1895 Tuzlukov, Russia
- Died: 22 April 1967 (aged 71) Moscow, Soviet Union
- Resting place: Vvedenskoye Cemetery
- Party: Communist
- Education: Moscow State University

Iona Timofeievich Nikitchenko (Russian: Иона Тимофеевич Никитченко; 28 June 1895 – 22 April 1967) was a Soviet judge who served on the Supreme Court of the Soviet Union. He later served on the International Military Tribunal during the Nuremberg trials as a judge for the Soviet Union.

== Early life and career ==
Iona Nikitchenko was born to a peasant family in khutor Tuzlukov (now Rostov Oblast). He studied at his local Agricultural Institute and from 1916 was a Bolshevik. His court experience started in May 1920 when he was appointed as the chairman-deputy of the Military Court of Semirechye Army Group during the Civil War. During the Russian Civil War, he participated on the frontlines in Central Asia. In 1924, he was appointed as the member of the Military Court Collegiate of the Moscow Military District.

As deputy chairman of Military Collegium of the Supreme Court of the Soviet Union, Nikitchenko presided over some of the most notorious of Joseph Stalin's show trials during the Great Purges from 1936 to 1938 and notably sentenced Lev Kamenev and Grigory Zinoviev.

== Nuremberg trials ==
Nikitchenko was one of the three main drafters of the London Charter. He was also the Soviet Union's judge at the Nuremberg trials and was president for the session at Berlin. Nikitchenko's prejudices were evident from the outset. Before the Tribunal had convened, Nikitchenko explained the Soviet perspective of the trials:

"We are dealing here with the chief war criminals who have already been convicted and whose conviction has been already announced by both the Moscow and Crimea [Yalta] declarations by the heads of the [Allied] governments.... The whole idea is to secure quick and just punishment for the crime."

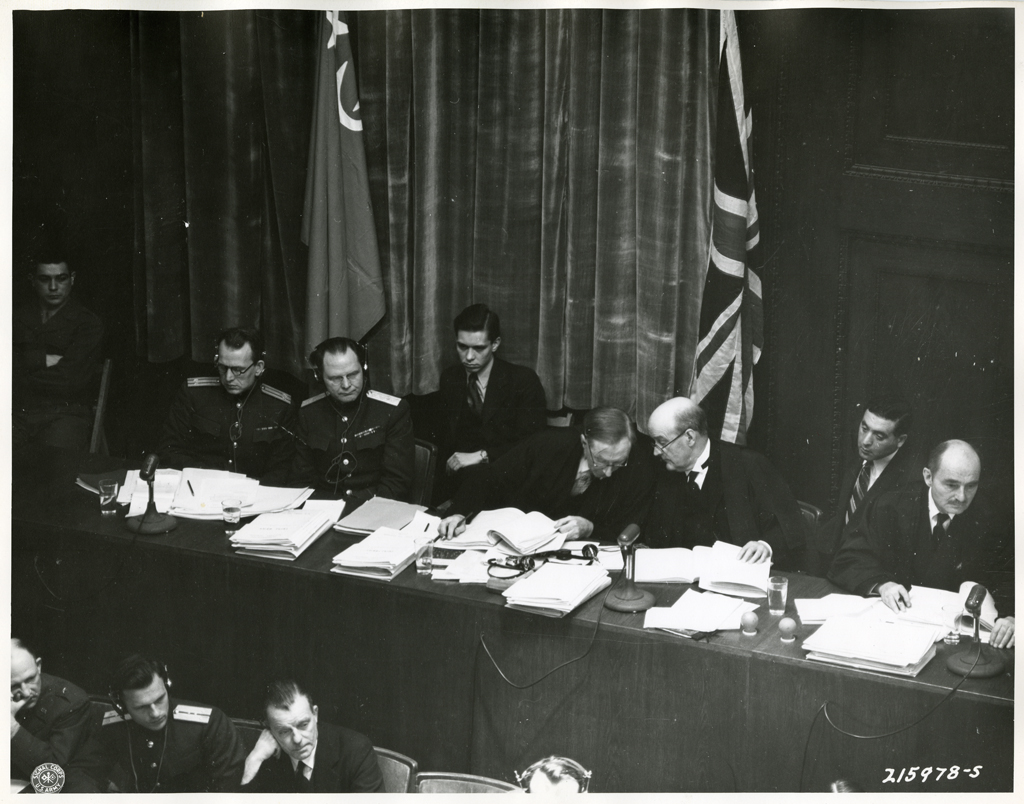
Panel of justices and attorneys at the Nuremberg trials

Nikitchenko dissented against the acquittals of Hjalmar Schacht, Franz von Papen and Hans Fritzsche; he also argued for a death sentence for Rudolf Hess, who was ultimately sentenced to life in prison by the tribunal. Nikitchenko said, in the lead-up to the trials, "If... the judge is supposed to be impartial, it would only lead to unnecessary delays." Nikitchenko also found the majority judgments incorrect with regard to the Reich Cabinet, the German General Staff and the Oberkommando der Wehrmacht. Having never before written a dissenting opinion—these being unheard of in Soviet jurisprudence—and being unsure of the form of such an opinion, Nikitchenko was assisted in writing his dissents by his fellow judge Norman Birkett.

Nikitchenko feared a compromise on too lenient a level. At the point of final deliberation he reexamined Hess' case and voted for a life sentence so that the opportunity for Hess to get away with a lesser degree of punishment did not occur.

== Later career ==
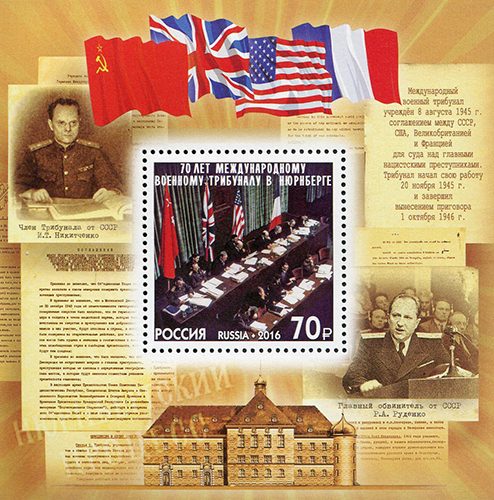
Russian postal card, issued on 14 December 2016 and dedicated to the 70th anniversary of the International Military Tribunal in Nuremberg, with images of Iona Nikitchenko and Roman Rudenko

In March 1946, Nikitchenko was re-elected to the Supreme Court of the USSR, and until July 1949 he worked as deputy chairman of this body. From August 1949 to September 1951, head of the department of linear water transport vessels of the Ministry of Justice. He retired in 1951.

Iona Nikitchenko died in 1967 and was buried at the Vvedenskoye Cemetery in Moscow.

== See also ==
- Outline of the Russian Revolution and Civil War
- Bibliography of the Russian Revolution and Civil War
- Bibliography of Stalinism and the Soviet Union
- Index of Old Bolsheviks
- Index of articles related to the Russian Revolution and Civil War
