= Gregory J. Moore =

American political scientist

Professor Gregory John Moore
- Born: Minneapolis, Minnesota, United States
- Other names: 莫凯歌 (Mo Kaige)

President of the Association of Chinese Political Studies
- In office 2020–2022

Head of the School of International Studies, University of Nottingham Ningbo China
- In office 2015–2020
- President: Yang Fujia
- Succeeded by: Grant Dawson (acting); David E. Kiwuwa

Personal details
- Children: 3 sons

Education
- Education: Concordia College (BA); University of Virginia (MA); University of Denver (PhD)
- Thesis: Human Nature, Collective Society and International Relations in the Thought of Reinhold Niebuhr (1991); Tiananmen, Taiwan and Belgrade: The Construction of Conflict in Sino-American Relations, 1989, 1995–1996, and 1999 (2004)
- Doctoral advisor: Jack Donnelly, then Suisheng Zhao

Philosophical work
- Institutions: Patrick Henry College (2024-present); Colorado Christian University (2020–); University of Nottingham Ningbo China (2015–2020); Zhejiang University (2010–2015); Eckerd College (2003–2010)
- Main interests: International relations; International security; Chinese foreign policy; U.S. foreign policy; Sino-American Relations; North Korean nuclear issue; East Asian studies

Gregory J. Moore is an American political scientist specializing in international relations, international security and Chinese politics and foreign policy. He teaches international politics and policy at Patrick Henry College in Purcellville, Virginia. He was previously a Stanton Fellow at the U.S. Air Force Academy in Colorado Springs, CO. Prior to that he was a professor of global studies and politics at Colorado Christian University, and taught political science and international relations at universities in China such as Zhejiang University and University of Nottingham Ningbo for roughly a decade.

== Biography ==
Moore was born in Minneapolis, Minnesota.

=== Education ===
In 1987, he earned a bachelor's degree in art and a minor in English from Concordia College in Moorhead, Minnesota. During his undergraduate studies, Moore spent a semester as an exchange student at the University of Dar es Salaam in Tanzania, which encouraged his interest in international affairs.

In 1991, he earned a master's degree in government and foreign affairs from the University of Virginia with a thesis on the thought of Reinhold Niebuhr.

After spending two years in China teaching international trade and then another year studying Chinese full time, Moore pursued a PhD in international studies at the University of Denver. During his doctoral studies, Moore focused on China and East Asia and became the assistant director of the university's Center for China-U.S. Cooperation. In 2004, he earned his doctorate with a doctorate on China-U.S. relations under the supervision of Chinese political scientist Suisheng Zhao and theorists Jack Donnelly and Paul Viotti. He studied Chinese for a year and a half in China during his doctoral studies before graduating with his PhD.

=== Academic career ===
- Assistant professor of political science and East Asian studies at the Eckerd College in St. Petersburg, Florida (2003–2010).
- Associate professor of political science at Zhejiang University, China (2010–2015).
- Head of International Studies and associate professor - and then professor - in international relations at the University of Nottingham Ningbo China (2015–2020).
- Professor of Global Studies and Politics at Colorado Christian University (2020-2023)
- Stanton Fellow, Political Science Department, U.S. Air Force Academy (2023-2024)
- Professor of Government, Patrick Henry College (2024-present)

Moore's research interests include international relations theory, constructivism in particular, international security, the North Korean nuclear issue, Sino-American Relations, East Asian studies, and foreign policy analysis of China and the United States. He is the author/editor of three books on international relations and has published many academic journal articles, book chapters and policy essays.

=== Affiliations ===
Moore has been affiliated with the following organizations:

- Member of the U.S. National Committee on United States-China Relations (2009–present).
- Member of the International Studies Association.
- Senior fellow at the China Policy Institute, University of Nottingham, UK (2015–present).
- President of the Association of Chinese Political Studies (2020–2022).
- Fellow at the Foreign Policy Institute of Paul H. Nitze School of Advanced International Studies (SAIS), Johns Hopkins University in Washington, D.C. (2019–2020).

== Personal life ==
Moore is a fluent Chinese speaker, and is married to Chenchen, from Zhejiang, China, and has three sons. In 2011, he got a Chinese driver's license.

In China, Moore's Chinese name is 莫凯歌(Mo Kaige).

== Political views ==
According to Moore, as a political scientist, he tries to get a balanced view of politics by reading liberal newspapers such as The New York Times and Washington Post, as well as conservative newspapers such as the Wall Street Journal and The Washington Times.

== Works ==
=== Books ===
- Niebuhrian International Relations: The Ethics of Foreign Policymaking (Oxford University Press, 2020).
- North Korean Nuclear Operationality: Regional Security and Non-Proliferation (Johns Hopkins University Press, 2014)(editor, foreword by Graham Allison).
- Human Rights and US Policy Toward China from a Christian Perspective (St. Davids, Pennsylvania: Crossroads Monograph Series on Faith and Public Policy, 1999).

=== Selected articles ===
- Huawei, Cyber-Sovereignty and Liberal Norms: China's Challenge to the West/Democracies. Journal of Chinese Political Science. (2022): 1–17.
- Audience Costs and China's South China Sea Policy. Journal of Asian Security and International Affairs, 7.3(2020): 325–348 (with Christopher Primiano).
- Bismarck or Wilhelm? China's Peaceful Rise vs. Its South China Sea Policy. Asian Perspective, 42.2(2018): 265–283.
- Avoiding a Thucydides Trap in Sino-American relations (... and 7 reasons why that might be difficult). Asian Security, 13.2(2017): 98–115.
- The Power of "Sacred Commitments": Chinese Interests in Taiwan. Foreign Policy Analysis, 12.2(2016): 214–235.
- The Difference a Day Makes: Understanding the End of the Sino-American “Tacit Alliance”. International Studies Review, 16.4(2014): 540–574.
- "In Your Face": Domestic Politics, Nationalism, and "Face" in the Sino-Japanese Islands Dispute. Asian Perspective, 38.2(2014): 219–240.
- Constructing Cooperation in Northeast Asia: Historical Northeast Asian Dyadic Cultures and the Potential for Greater Regional Cooperation. Journal of Contemporary China, 22.83(2013): 887–904.
- An International Relations Perspective on the Science, Politics, and Potential of an Extraterrestrial Sino-US Arms Race. Asian Perspective, 35.4.(2011): 643–658.
- History, Nationalism and Face in Sino-Japanese Relations. Journal of Chinese Political Science, 3.15(2010): 283–306.
- Not Very Material but Hardly Immaterial: China's Bombed Embassy and Sino-American Relations. Foreign Policy Analysis, 6.1(2010): 23–41.
- How North Korea Threatens China’s Interests: Understanding Chinese ‘Duplicity’ on the North Korean Nuclear Issue. International Relations of the Asia-Pacific, 8.1(2008): 1–29.
- America's Failed North Korea Nuclear Policy: A New Approach. Asian Perspective, 34.2(2008): 9–27.
- From the Ground Up: Recent Contributions of the China/area studies and Sino–American Relations Literature to IR Theory. Journal of Contemporary China, 13.39(2004): 391–408.

=== Selected essays ===
- “Hypersonic Tonic: A US New Year’s Resolution on Hypersonic Offense and Defense,” The National Interest (December 31, 2022).
- “Biden’s Submission to Hostage Diplomacy Endangers Americans Abroad,” Washington Times (December 19, 2022).
- "Biden is Right: The United States Must Defend Taiwan,"The National Interest (July 26, 2022).
- "Planes to Ukraine: Bring Back the Flying Tigers," Washington Examiner (March 16.2022).
- "American Airpower and U.S. Interests in Ukraine," Townhall (December 28, 2021).
- "President Trump, China has probably done all it can on North Korea – the ball’s in your court now,"Asia Dialogue (December 3, 2018).
- "Xi Jinping: Strongman Among Rivals," Asia Dialogue (December 5, 2017).
- "Reining in Pyongyang's Nuclear Ambitions: Washington and Beijing's Common Interests," The News Lens (April 7, 2017).
- "It's Time for Bold U.S. Thinking on North Korea," Global Asia (Spring, 2017).
- "It's Not Just Material: Politics, Culture and Ideas Might Drive China into Confrontation," The National Interest (July 27, 2016).
- "No Escape: America Should Join China's New Bank" The National Interest (March 31, 2015).
- "1914, Air Sea Battle, and Sino-American Security Relations: Advantage Offense!" Asia Dialogue (November 22, 2014).
- "China's Stake in the Ukraine Crisis," The Diplomat, (May 21, 2014).

=== Selected book chapters ===
- China, Russia and the United States: Balance of Power or National Narcissism?. In Brandon Yoder (ed.) The United States and Contemporary China-Russia Relations. Palgrave Macmillan, 2022: 55–77
- The Logic of Power Politics: The Thucydides Trap and the China-US Trade War. In Shiping Hua (ed.) The Political Logic of the US–China Trade War. Lexington Books. 2022.
- Less Beautiful, Still Somewhat Imperialist: Beijing Eyes Sino-US Relations. In Shaun Breslin (ed.) Handbook of China's International Relations. Routledge. 2010: 129–137.
- China's Strategic Posture in the Asia-Pacific Region under the Leadership of Hu Jintao. In Simon Shen (ed.) Multidimensional Diplomacy of Contemporary China. Lexington Books. 2010.
- The Roles of Misperceptions and Perceptual Gaps in the Taiwan Strait Crisis of 1995–1996. In Shiping Hua and Sujian Guo (eds.) China in the Twenty-First Century. Palgrave Macmillan. 2007: 171–194

=== Supervised works ===
- Krasnopolsky, Peter (2019). Central Asian regionalism and the roles of Russia and China: Money, Transport, Energy, Ideas. University of Nottingham Ningbo.
  - China, Russia and Central Asian Infrastructure: Fragmenting or Reformatting the Region? (Palgrave Macmillan, 2022).
- Gao, Bo [高波] (2017). Crossing the Ya-Lu River: Chinese economic activities in North Korea Post-2002. University of Nottingham Ningbo.
  - China's Economic Engagement in North Korea (Palgrave Macmillan, 2019).
- Wang, Qixing [王齐兴] (2016). Analysis of the Role of Big Data in Constructing National Information Security: Case Studies of China and the United States.(Chinese: 大数据构建国家信息安全作用分析 ——以中美为例). Zhejiang University.
- Weng, Zhimian [翁知勉] (2014). The Balance of Tribute in Perspective of Power: Exploring the Construction and Operation of the Tributary System (Chinese: 权势视角下的朝贡均衡——探析朝贡体系的建构与运行). Zhejiang University.
- Yao, Jinfang [姚金芳] (2014). Current Situation and Future of Fishermen's Safety in China's Maritime Disputes: A "Human Security" Perspective. (Chinese: 中国海洋争端中的渔民安全现状与未来：“人的安全”视角). Zhejiang University.
- Fazza, Gloria (2012). China's Engagement in Myanmar: Cross-border Interventions against Drug Trafficking. Zhejiang University.
