= Palestinian right of armed resistance =

Concept in the Israeli-Palestinian conflict

Many scholars have argued that Palestinians have the right to resist under international law, including armed resistance. This right to resist is in a jus ad bellum sense only; the conduct of such resistance (jus in bello) must be in accordance with laws of war. This implies that attacks on Israeli military targets could be allowed but attacks on Israeli civilians are prohibited. Whether it is Palestinians who have the right to resist against the Israeli occupation, or it is Israel that has the right to self-defense against Palestinian violence, is one of the most important questions in the Israeli–Palestinian conflict.

It is agreed that, under international law, Palestinians have the right to self-determination. Many scholars support Palestinians' right to use armed struggle in pursuit of self-determination. Such a right is supported by the Protocol I to the Geneva Conventions, Declaration on Friendly Relations, as well as several resolutions of the United Nations Security Council and General Assembly. Some writers caution that force can only be resorted to after non-violent means of achieving self-determination have been exhausted while other scholars state that Palestinians have indeed exhausted all non-violent means. As evidence, such writers point to the failure of the Oslo Accords to bring about Palestinian self-determination, believing that armed resistance is the only option. Some scholars argue Palestinians also have the right to self-defense, but others point out that not everyone recognizes the State of Palestine and insist that only the ousted sovereign may invoke self-defense from an occupied territory.

Scholars who support a right to armed resistance agree that such a right must be exercised in accordance with international humanitarian law. In particular, only Israeli soldiers may be targeted, while civilians must be spared. The State of Palestine has ratified and is a party to the Geneva Conventions.

== Protocol I of the Geneva Conventions ==
Protocol I of the Geneva Conventions is frequently cited to justify Palestinians' right under international law to resist Israeli occupation. Additional Protocol I (API) of the Geneva Conventions says in Article 1(4):

The situations referred to in the preceding paragraph include armed conflicts in which peoples are fighting against colonial domination and alien occupation and against racist régimes in the exercise of their right of self-determination

The authors of this article were referring to wars of national liberation that had accompanied decolonisation, the Israeli occupation of Palestinians and the racist apartheid South Africa. "Alien occupation" refers to territory conquered by a state, but not yet annexed and was inhabited by a different ethnic group.

While most countries have ratified API, Israel has not. However, if API has the status of customary international law, then all states would remain bound by it, even if they have not ratified it. Whether Article 1(4) has the status of customary international law is disputed: Clayton Swisher argues it has, but Yoram Dinstein says it has not.

Jan Hessbruegge writes that while international law is generally neutral in cases of rebellions, the above constitutes an exception that considers a rebellion to be "a lawful exercise of a right to resistance." Yoram Dinstein argues that while international law doesn't prohibit such acts of resistance, it also doesn't prevent the occupying state from penalizing those who resist. In this view, Palestinians who resist don't have protected prisoner of war status.

Sahar Francis argues that the right of resistance against occupation is protected by international law, because Article 4 of the Third Geneva Convention grants POW status to "organized resistance movements" who meet certain criteria.

== Declaration on Friendly Relations ==
The Declaration on Friendly Relations is considered the most significant achievement for the right of self-determination, as it was adopted unanimously by the UNGA without any opposition. The relevant paragraph of that Declaration states,

Every State has the duty to refrain from any forcible action which deprives peoples...of their right to self-determination and freedom and independence. In their actions against, and resistance to, such forcible action in pursuit of the exercise of their right to self-determination, such peoples are entitled to seek and to receive support in accordance with the purposes and principles of the Charter.

— Declaration on Friendly Relations

Richard A. Falk applies this to the case of Palestinians, arguing that the Palestinian right to armed resistance stems from Israel's denial of Palestinian right of self-determination. Thus, not only does it make Palestinian armed resistance legitimate, but it also legitimizes material support they may receive from third-party governments. Likewise, in 1983 John F. Murphy said the Declaration of Friendly Relations indicated that most UNGA members deemed it permissible to supply arms to Palestinians.

This right is affirmed in the context of the right of self-determination of all peoples under foreign and colonial rule. The United Nations General Assembly (UNGA) has expressly affirmed the right of Palestinians to resist Israeli military occupation, including through armed struggle. General Assembly resolution A/RES/38/17 (22/11/1983) stated that it "Reaffirms the legitimacy of the struggle of peoples for their independence, territorial integrity, national unity and liberation from colonial domination, apartheid and foreign occupation by all available means, including armed struggle".

Ben Saul argues that armed resistance here is only legitimized if a people's right to self-determination has been forcibly denied. Jan Hessbruegge argues that the definition of "forcible denial of self-determination" is narrow, but does apply to Israel's occupation of Palestinians. Jeremie Bracka agrees that Israel has denied Palestinian self-determination. Antonio Cassese writes that the position that national liberation movements may only resort to force in response to "forcible denial of the right to self-determination" is an "awkward" legal situation that was created due to disagreements at the UN over when such movements can use force. Nevertheless, Cassese writes, on two "rare" occasions the UNGA explicitly granted a people "license" to use force: namely the Palestinians (in 1977) and the Namibians (in 1984).

== Palestinian right of self-determination ==
The Palestinians' right to self-determination is widely recognized. It has been confirmed by numerous UN resolutions. Many scholars opine that Palestinians may resort to armed resistance to achieve their right to self-determination. The legitimacy of armed resistance for the struggle of self-determination can be seen in the international treaties and UNGA resolutions (see sections above). Some scholars opine that armed struggle is only legitimate after non-violent means of self-determination have failed (see sub-section below).

Marco Longobardo opines that the struggle for self-determination can only be invoked by armed groups operating under a national liberation movement recognized by the UNGA. The UNGA recognized the PLO as a representative of Palestinians in a 1974 resolution, and even the UNSC invited it for discussions relating to Palestine/Israel. The UNGA has also determined that the prolonged Israeli occupation is not justified, thus conferring legitimacy upon armed struggle against the occupying power (it also made that determination in case of Namibia and Western Sahara).

Traditional jus ad bellum concerns conflict between states, but the struggle for self-determination can confer similar legitimacy to armed resistance movements.

=== Exhaustion of non-violent means ===
Tom Farer argues that the spirit of the UN Charter is that violence must only be attempted as last resort. In his view, Palestinians have exhausted non-violent forms of resistance. Immediately after 1967, some Palestinian leaders demanded autonomy in the occupied territories, but Israel rejected that. In fact, Israel banned all political activity. Palestinians tried Gandhism by refusing to pay taxes, but Israel responded to that via violent beatings and mass detentions. For the next 20 years, Israel denied Palestinians many human rights. The initial months of the 1988 First Intifada, according to Farer, were relatively non-lethal as it often involved teenagers armed with nothing but stones; yet Israel responded with lethal violence.

Likewise, Ayman Salama argues the Palestinians, in their pursuit of self-determination, "have reached the end of their tether", leaving them with no choice but to use force. He points out that Palestinians have recognized Israel's 1967 borders, and the 2002 Arab Peace Initiative was spurned by Israel.

Elyakim Rubenstein argues that Palestinians have no reason to resort to armed resistance given their rights are protected by Israeli courts, which he characterizes as "fair". Clayton Swisher points out that few Palestinians view the Israeli courts as fair.

In 2023, a letter by lawyers in the West Bank argued Palestinians had a right to resist, because the international community had failed the Palestinians.

In referring to Palestinian armed resistance to Israel, Robbie Sabel points out that countries often don't allow people to peacefully gain self-determination. For example, only due to the armed resistance in Cyprus and in Kenya did the British finally allow those countries to gain independence.

==== Oslo Accords ====
In 1996, Peter Malanczuk opined that as a result of the Oslo Accords, the PLO no longer has the right of armed resistance against Israel, nor can Israel invoke a right to force (including self-defense) against the PLO. Some Israelis further argue that PLO's renunciation of armed resistance means that right no longer exists for other Palestinian groups either. However, Clayton Swisher argues that the right of armed resistance is non-derogable as it is guaranteed under Protocol I, which has become a part of customary international law (non-derogable rights can't be signed away). Thus many Palestinians believe their right to resist exists in spite of Oslo.

Richard Falk argues that by 2000, in spite of the Oslo process, it was clear that Israel would not be allowing for Palestinian right to self-determination; there exists strong consensus at the UN for the Palestinian right to self-determination. Thus, Palestinians maintain their right to armed resistance to achieve self-determination, according to Falk. In 2015, again he argued that Israel was using the peace process as cover for expanding illegal settlements and imposing apartheid on Palestinians, leaving Palestinians with resistance as the only way left to achieve self-determination.

Marco Longobardo agrees that PLO's renunciation of armed resistance indicates peaceful means to end the occupation are preferred. So long as both parties are conducting negotiations on Palestinian statehood, he opines, Palestinians can't claim the right to armed resistance on the basis of self-determination. In December 2017, Hamas called for a new "intifada" against Israel on the basis of the peace process being "destroyed", in the eyes of Palestinians, by the US decision to move the embassy to Jerusalem.

Tom Farer argued that the "renewal" of violent resistance (in the Second Intifada) was due to continued Israeli occupation and justified in international law. He points out the 33 years of occupation had passed by then and that Palestinians had attempted various non-violent forms of resistance.

In 2022, a report by OHCHR argued that given the Oslo process perpetuated the Israeli occupation, it violated the Palestinian right to self-determination, a jus cogens norm, therefore rendering the Oslo process invalid. Shahd Hammouri cited that report to argue in favor of the Palestinian right to resist, in spite of the Oslo Accords.

== Palestinian right to self-defense ==
Many scholars have argued that Palestinians also possess the right to use force in defending themselves from the Israeli occupation, the naval blockade of Gaza, and Israeli attacks on Palestinian civilians. Many scholars argue that the aforementioned Israeli actions constitute acts of aggression against Palestinians. While some scholars argue Palestinians have the right to self-defense, others argue that only states have the right to self-defense and the State of Palestine doesn't exist.

Azmi Bishara argues for the Palestinian right to use force both for self-defense and also self-determination. On the other hand, Jan Hessbruegge argues that non-state groups do not have the right to self-defense, but still upholds Palestinians' right to use force in pursuit of self-determination, as discussed in section above. One reason why scholars differentiate between right to self-determination from right to self-defense, is because it is often held that while the former belongs to non-self governing peoples, the latter only belongs to states. However, not all scholars agree with this view.

=== Israeli acts of aggression ===
Those who support a Palestinian right to self-defense cite Israeli attacks on Palestinian civilians, the naval blockade of Gaza and the Israeli occupation itself as acts of aggression that justify self-defense.

==== Blockade of Gaza Strip ====
Since 2007, the Gaza Strip has been under an Israeli naval and air blockade. The blockade has had devastating effects on availability of food and medicine in Gaza Strip, resulting in many deaths. Marco Longobardo argues the blockade can be construed as an act of war, and Yousef Shandi agrees that the blockade meets the UNGA definition of the crime of aggression.

==== Attacks on civilians ====
Birzeit University professor Yousef Shandi argues that attacks by Israel on the Gaza Strip, including civilians, meet the UNGA definition of the crime of aggression.

Palestinian Islamic Jihad has justified its military actions by citing the Palestinian right to self-defense, in response to the occupation and Israeli attacks on Palestinian civilians. Likewise, Hamas has also characterized its military actions as an act of self-defense, citing Israeli violations of Palestinian human rights, destruction of infrastructure in Gaza etc. The founder of Hamas, Ahmed Yassin, differentiated between Palestinian armed struggle against Israel's occupation vs armed struggle against Israeli attacks on Palestinian civilians.

==== The occupation itself ====
Palestinian professor Yousef Shandi quotes the Nuremberg trials, which upheld the right of self-defense of people against an enemy that "unrightfully" occupies territories. But, Israeli professor Yoram Dinstein says that there is a widespread idea that civilians under military occupation have the right to forcibly resist the Occupying power, but this is a misconception. If the occupied people try to resist the occupation, Dinstein argues, their actions are crimes that can be punished by the Occupying Power at its discretion.

John B. Quigley echoed the argument of R. Y. Jennings, that it is a legal for a state to try to forcibly recapture its own territory that was occupied by an act of aggression. For example, in 1973, UNSC did not condemn Egypt and Syria for starting a war to retake the Sinai Peninsula and Golan Heights, which Israel took from them in 1967.

=== Applicability to non-state groups ===
Whether non-state groups have the right to self-defense, and whether Palestinians constitute a state, are both controversial questions on which scholars are divided.

==== Article 51 of the UN charter ====
Article 51 of the UN charter states,

Nothing in the present Charter shall impair the inherent right of collective or individual self-defense if an armed attack occurs against a member of the United Nations, until the Security Council has taken measures necessary to maintain international peace and security.

Many scholars believe the Article 51 self-defense is only available to states. Shahd Hammouri argues the wording "collective or individual" leaves open the possibility of individuals and collectives organizing self-defense in response to aggression.

Marko Milanovic argues that if one accepts a State of Palestine exists, then it would have the right to self-defense. Milanovic accepts there is no doubt whatsoever that Palestine ought to exist as a state, but despite widespread recognition, many states do not recognize it as a state, most notably Israel. Palestine remains a non-member observer at the UN. Milanovic proposes one could possibly argue that Article 51 also applies to "self-determination units" that have not yet achieved statehood, but admits that is a difficult argument to make. If Palestine does exist as a state, then Israel's occupation constitutes an armed attack against such a state.

Francis Boyle argues that the State of Palestine possesses the right to self-defense, like all other states, and this includes the right to use force to end Israel's illegal occupation. He compares Palestinian resistance to Israeli occupation with French resistance to Nazi occupation.

Marco Longobardo argues that while Palestine is widely recognized, the Palestinian Authority has never invoked self-defense despite repeated Israeli attacks on the Gaza Strip. Even countries which have condemned Israeli attacks and recognized Palestinian statehood have not yet affirmed the Palestinian right to self-defense.

==== Self-defense from oppression ====
Jan Arno Hessbruegge writes that international law does not give non-state groups a right to self-defense—not even from genocide. For example, during the Rwandan Genocide, the UNSC criticized the use of force not just by the Rwandan government (which was committing the genocide) but also the use of force by the Rwandan Patriotic Front (which was trying to stop the genocide). Similarly, the UNSC criticized all parties for violence during the Syrian Civil War, including those who were defending against atrocities. However, in the case of the First Libyan Civil War, the UNSC only condemned Gaddafi, not the rebels fighting against him. Hessbruegge concedes that many writers, nevertheless, do believe a right to resist against a government that commits international crimes or oppression.

== Implication for Israeli right to self-defense ==
Scholars argue that if Palestinians have the right to self-defense then Israel does not; in corollary, in a situation where Israel has the right to self-defense implies deeming Palestinian resistance to be illegal. This is because a hypothetical situation in which both sides are justified in using force against the other is logically unfeasible. This can be restated as: there can be no self-defense against legitimate self-defense. Michael Neumann explains this via two analogies: robbers have no right to defend themselves against bank guards; Saddam's forces occupying Kuwait had no right to defend themselves against attacks by the US-led coalition, and in trying to defend themselves they committed further injustice. Israeli professor David Heyd disagrees and gives the example of the Gaza war. If one assumes Hamas launched the October 7 attacks in self-defense (in response to Israel's occupation), Israel still had the right to defend its civilians from Hamas; likewise if ones assumes Israel's invasion was an act of self-defense, Hamas still had the right to defend Palestinian civilians from Israeli violence.

Sharon Weill and Valentina Azarova argue that so long as Israel is occupying the Palestinian territories, it may not invoke Article 51 right to self-defence. Weill and Azarova argue that since Palestinians have the legitimate right of resistance to Israeli occupation, Hamas attacks on Israel are not jus ad bellum violations (although indiscriminate rocket attacks are jus in bello violations).

As for what Israel should do in response to these attacks, Michael Neumann writes that self-defense is only allowed if there are no alternatives, but an occupying power, by definition, can always withdraw. Yousef Shandi writes that Israel can only claim self-defense if the Palestinian armed attacks continue even after Israel ends its occupation of both the West Bank and Gaza Strip. Sharon Weill and Valentina Azarova write that until Israel ends its occupation, it cannot invoke Article 51 right to self-defense.

=== Legality of Israeli occupation ===
Jan Hessbruegge writes that "who exercises self-defense against whom" is one of the most important issues in the Israeli–Palestinian conflict, and depends on whether one considers Israel's occupation of the Palestinians as legal. If the occupation is lawful, then Israel has right to self-defense, but if the occupation is unlawful, then it is the Palestinians who would have the right to self-defense against Israel.

The Israeli government disputed whether Israel still occupied Gaza after its 2005 disengagement. Even if one agrees the Gaza Strip was not occupied, the West Bank has remained occupied, since Israel retains direct control over Area C, and the IDF is capable of reasserting control over Areas A and B.

== Russia–Ukraine analogy ==
Nathan J. Robinson compares Palestinian political violence against the Israeli occupation to the Ukrainian counteroffensives against the Russian occupation. Robinson further compares Palestinian rocket attacks into Israeli territory to Ukrainian attacks that crossed into Russian territory. He concludes that both Palestinians and Ukrainians have the right to resist, and doesn't support Israel's nor Russia's right to self-defense against such violence. (Robinson emphasizes that right to resist does not justify violence against civilians.)

The comparison of Israel–Palestine to Russia–Ukraine is also made by an editorial in The New Humanitarian, and by Moustafa Bayoumi, Raji Sourani, Nour Odeh, Mustafa Barghouti, and Shawan Jabarin.

== Harming civilians ==
Scholars who support a Palestinian right to resist Israeli occupation, nevertheless agree that this does not in any way justify killing or wounding civilians. David Thompson states Palestinian militants must only attack occupying Israeli forces and refrain from attacking Israeli civilians. Richard Falk, Azmi Bishara, and Francis Boyle, all staunch supporters of Palestinian right to armed resistance, absolutely oppose any attacks on civilians. By contrast, Joshua Muravchik accuses supporters of the Palestinian right to resist of endorsing "murders aimed at civilian targets".

=== "by all means" ===
The language used by supporters of Palestinian right to resist sometimes is written as "Palestinian People have the right to resistance by all means available at their disposal." The "by all means" is meant to be interpreted in a jus ad bellum sense, and not in a jus in bello sense. Azmi Bishara emphasizes that "any means" mean any means consistent with the UN Charter and other laws of war. Shahd Hammouri, for example, emphasizes that the right to resist, like the right to self-defense, must adhere to international humanitarian law. Hammouri prefers the phrasing "Palestinian people have the right of resistance by all means consistent with the principles of the UN Charter." Likewise, a 1974 UNGA resolution recognized "the right of the Palestinian people to regain its rights by all means in accordance with the purposes and principles of the Charter of the United Nations."

=== Palestinian diplomatic activities ===
The 1988 Palestinian Declaration of Independence (along the 1967 borders) also proclaimed "the right of peoples to resist foreign occupation" but also rejected "terror in all its forms, including state terror". Yasser Arafat later clarified that this was a reference to rejecting "anti-civilian terrorism".

In 1989, one year after declaring independence, the Palestinian state ratified the Geneva Conventions, recognizing its obligations for warfare under International Humanitarian Law (e.g. not targeting civilians). Israel has also ratified the Geneva Conventions, but has consistently maintained that it is not de jure bound to apply the entirety of the Geneva Conventions to the occupied territories. It has, however, agreed to voluntarily abide by the de facto "humanitarian provisions" of the Conventions.

In 2001, Hamas tried to persuade foreign ministers attending the Organization of the Islamic Conference (OIC) to issue a statement in support for its suicide bombings. In response, the Secretary General of the Arab League upheld the Palestinian right to resistance and self-defense against Israel's occupation, but also said that civilians must be protected. In 2005, Hamas renounced the use of suicide bombings against civilians.

== Skepticism ==
Many supporters of Palestinians have lamented international law not being more assertive on the rights of stateless peoples. Yousef Munayyer argues that international law was "crafted by states, and largely for states" and ignored the needs of the stateless.

Some believe that Palestinians do not have any right of armed resistance against Israel's occupation. As mentioned above, Israeli professor Yoram Dinstein argued that occupied people have no right to resist the military occupation. In 2001, Amira Hass wrote that many Israelis do not believe Israel is occupying the Palestinians. Hass writes that these Israelis saw the Second Intifada as an unprovoked "act of aggression", rather than as an "act of resistance".

Valentina Capurri writes that the Palestinian right to armed resistance is treated with skepticism by two groups. The first are those who do not believe Israel is oppressing the Palestinians, and the second group are those who argue that Palestinians can only legitimately resist through non-violent means (e.g. many in the BDS movement).

== United Nations resolutions ==
A number of resolutions, both in the United Nations Security Council (UNSC) and in the United Nations General Assembly (UNGA), have been interpreted as upholding the right of armed resistance against foreign occupation, especially for the Palestinians.

=== UNSC on Fatah raids (1968) ===
After Israel's occupation of the West Bank in 1967, Fatah began launching raids against Israel from Jordan. While most raids were aimed at military targets, some were aimed at civilians. Israel retaliated by attacking Fatah camps in Jordan, killing large numbers of people, many of them bystanders.

Twice in 1968, the UNSC condemned Israeli retaliations against Fatah: UNSC 248 and UNSC 256. During the debates, UNSC non-permanent member Pakistan argued Fatah attacks on Israel were legitimate because their goal was for Palestinians to "return in freedom in their own homeland". Likewise, France rejected Israel's claim to "security of the territory" under its jurisdiction, given that Israel's jurisdiction in the West Bank was established through occupation. France further said Palestinians raids into Israel were the "almost inevitable consequence of military occupation".

=== UNSC on raids on Portuguese colonies (1969) ===
Around the same time as Fatah was attacking Israel from Jordan, guerilla groups seeking independence were attacking Portuguese colonies of Angola, Mozambique, and Guinea-Bissau from neighboring states. Like Israel, Portugal made cross-border reprisal attacks against these guerillas into the neighboring states that were hosting the guerillas. The UNSC condemned Portuguese reprisal attacks into Zambia (UNSC Res 268), Senegal (UNSC Res 273), and Guinea (UNSC Res 290). It rejected Portugal's supposed right to retaliate against guerilla attacks, and instead criticized Portugal for failing to respect the locals' right to self-determination. John Quigley opines that in doing so, the UNSC recognized guerillas' right to attack Portugal as superior to Portugal's right to attack the guerillas.

=== UNGA resolutions ===
The 1971 UNGA resolution 2787 states,

Confirms the legality of the peoples' struggle for self-determination and liberation from colonial and foreign domination and alien subjugation, notably in southern Africa and in particular that of the people of Zimbabwe, Namibia, Angola, Mozambique and Guinea (Bissau), as well as the Palestinian people, by all available means consistent with the Charter of the United Nations

The 1979 UNGA resolution 34/44 states,

Reaffirms the legitimacy of the struggle of peoples for independence, territorial integrity, national unity and liberation from colonial and alien domination and foreign occupation by all available means, including armed struggle. Reaffirms the inalienable right of the peoples of Namibia and Zimbabwe, of the Palestinian people and of all peoples under colonial and alien domination to self-determination, national independence, territorial integrity, and national unity and sovereignty without external interference.

The 1982 UNGA resolution 37/43 states,

Reaffirms the legitimacy of the struggle of peoples for independence, territorial integrity, national unity and liberation from colonial and foreign domination and foreign occupation by all available means, including armed struggle. Reaffirms the inalienable right of the Namibian people, the Palestinian people and all peoples under foreign and colonial domination to self-determination, national independence, territorial integrity, national unity and sovereignty without outside interference.

The 1983 UNGA resolution 38/17 states that it "Reaffirms the legitimacy of the struggle of peoples for their independence, territorial integrity, national unity and liberation from colonial domination, apartheid and foreign occupation by all available means, including armed struggle".

== See also ==
- Palestinian self-determination
- Palestinian right of return
