= Populist Authoritarianism =

2016 book by Wenfang Tang

Populist Authoritarianism: Chinese Political Culture and Regime Sustainability
- Cover
- Author: Wenfang Tang
- Language: English
- Subject: Political culture and public opinion in China; authoritarianism
- Genre: Non-fiction
- Publisher: Oxford University Press
- Publication date: 2016
- Publication place: United States
- Media type: Print, digital
- Pages: 220
- ISBN: 978-0-19-020578-2
- OCLC: 925426131
- Dewey Decimal: 306.20951
- LC Class: JQ1516 .T353 2016

Populist Authoritarianism: Chinese Political Culture and Regime Sustainability is a 2016 book by the political scientist Wenfang Tang.

Using more than twenty Chinese and cross-national public opinion surveys conducted between 1987 and 2015, Tang argues that the coexistence in China of frequent protest against local authorities and high public support for the central government reflects a political culture of "populist authoritarianism", rooted in the Chinese Communist Party's mass line, in which the state deals directly with citizens and responds quickly to their demands in the absence of strong intermediate institutions.

== Background ==
In the acknowledgments section, Tang recalled that he took a 1986 graduate course on the Chinese communist movement taught by Tang Tsou at the University of Chicago. Tang wrote a paper on the mass line ideology for that course. At the time Tang expected China to move away from revolutionary politics toward a rule-based bureaucratic order. Nearly thirty years later, he says, and seeing continuity with the revolutionary past beneath the changes in Chinese politics, Tang returned to the paper and the literature on the mass line, which he reveals later became the foundation of the first chapter. Tang also credited Tianjian Shi, a college classmate and political scientist who died in 2009, whose interest in traditional Chinese culture prompted Tang to consider the Communist Party's governing style as a source of contemporary political culture.

Tang rewrote some parts of the book in response to criticism of early drafts. According to the acknowledgments, some of his colleagues in Taiwan "strongly disagreed" with Tang's comparison of political trust in mainland China and Taiwan, which led Tang to revise that chapter and to add a chapter on the reliability of Chinese survey responses. Ronald Inglehart commented on the chapter on interpersonal trust even though its findings challenged Inglehart's own work on democracy and civic culture. An earlier version of the chapter on nationalism had appeared in the Journal of Contemporary China in 2012, co-written with Benjamin Darr. The sixth wave of the World Values Survey in China, conducted in 2012 and 2013, was funded by the Chiang Ching-kuo Foundation, the Stanley Hua Hsia Endowment and the University of Iowa, where Tang then taught, and four urban telephone surveys between 2013 and 2015 were supported by a grant from the Institute of Public Policy at South China University of Technology. Tang completed the manuscript during summer visiting appointments at the East Asian Institute of the National University of Singapore in 2013 and 2014.

In 2018 Tang restated the book's findings for a general readership in "The 'Surprise' of Authoritarian Resilience in China", an essay in American Affairs that set out what Tang called "controversial and provocative findings" from three decades of Chinese survey research: high regime support, high interpersonal trust, widespread political activism and high perceived government responsiveness, together with Tang's earlier conclusion that the 1989 Tiananmen protests had been driven more by anxiety over market reform than by demands for liberal democracy. In that essay, he also answered criticisms (particularly the criticism raised in some reviews of the book), among them the political scientist Rory Truex's doubts about the face validity of China's high interpersonal trust and the argument that Chinese citizens rate their government as responsive only because their expectations are low. Tang wrote that personal impressions "cannot serve to discredit survey findings, especially when surveys are based on representative samples." In an opinion piece for The New York Times, David Brooks used and cited the essay to argue that China's challenge to the United States had become moral and intellectual as well as economic. Brooks repeated Tang's revelation that Chinese citizens trusted their governing institutions more than Americans did, and that 78 percent of Chinese respondents in a 2008 study said their government responded to their needs, compared with 33 percent of Japanese and 21 percent of South Korean respondents.

== Summary ==
Tang asks why public support for China's central government has remained high even though protests against local authorities have multiplied. He argues that both stem from a political culture that he calls populist authoritarianism, inherited from the Chinese Communist Party's mass line.

In 2013, protests erupted in Xiamen in which residents seeking further compensation over a land agreement signed 24 years earlier with a golf club owned by overseas investors injured several police officers and forced a female district official to kneel, stripped to the waist, and apologize. The district government reportedly agreed to build roads, bridges and a garbage-processing center, and none of the protesters was arrested. Tang considered the episode as typical of a state that reaches the public directly, bypassing courts and administrative procedure, and of a public willing to confront local officials.

In the first chapter, Tang tries to investigate the origins of the term mass line (qunzhong luxian). That leads him to Li Lisan in 1928 and to Mao Zedong's 1943 formula "from the masses, to the masses". He identifies three components: a direct link between state and society with few intermediate organizations, mass mobilization, and an implicit social contract in which the Party serves the public in return for its support. Tang describes the collectivization of the 1950s (with its rural communes and urban work units) as a "primitive accumulation of social capital", adapting Marx's term, and points to the mass line website launched after the 18th Party Congress in 2012 and to Xi Jinping's description of the mass line as the Party's "family treasure" as evidence of continuity after Mao. The author also defends a behaviorist, survey-based approach to political culture against institutionalist, rational-choice and ethnosymbolist objections, likening China research before the mid-1980s to "writing a mystery novel about the Byzantine elite's political maneuvering behind the Bamboo Curtain".

The empirical chapters draw on more than twenty Chinese and cross-national surveys collected between 1987 and 2015, among them the World Values Survey, the Asian Barometer, the 2008 China Survey, the 2010 Chinese General Social Survey and the 2012 China Labor-force Dynamics Survey; urban surveys from the late 1980s allow comparison with opinion at the time of the 1989 Tiananmen protests. Responding to forecasts of collapse by writers such as Gordon G. Chang, Minxin Pei and David Shambaugh, the second chapter reports that Chinese respondents ranked lowest on happiness among 25 countries and regions in the 2005–2008 World Values Survey but highest in confidence in political institutions, and that satisfaction stood at 76 out of 100 for the central government but 54 for village and neighborhood governments; anger at county governments was the kind most likely to lead to petitions and protest. On International Social Survey Programme measures, Chinese nationalism ranks highest of 36 countries and regions and is stronger among Party members and older generations than among younger and urban respondents; Tang treats it as a Party construction that weakens support for democracy, and suggests that Western criticism of China's human rights record tends to reinforce it. Dividing interpersonal trust into parochial (family and relatives), communal (neighbors, coworkers, fellow villagers) and civic (strangers, foreigners, businesspeople) types, the fourth chapter finds that communal trust, which Tang attributes to the commune and the work unit, contributes most to China's high general trust and to regime support.

A chapter written with Joseph (Yingnan) Zhou and Ray Ou Yang compares mainland China with Taiwan as societies sharing a Confucian heritage but differing in political system. In that comparison, the mainland scores higher on every measure of political trust, and perceived government responsiveness, as shown by 77 percent of mainland respondents against 36 percent in Taiwan, is the strongest predictor. Two chapters on contention combine case studies of incidents at Wukan, Shifang, Weng'an and elsewhere with national survey data. The central government, argue Tang, tolerates and even partly encourages protest directed at local officials and firms because it channels anger away from Beijing. Also, workplace disputes are settled mostly through negotiation and protest rather than through courts, trade unions or the media, contrary to the expectation that marketization would strengthen the rule of law. In another chapter written with Yang Zhang, Tang embeds list experiments in national and urban surveys to test whether respondents hide political distrust. They estimate that reported trust in central leaders is overstated by about eight percentage points, a smaller effect than the one found for admitting to bribery.

The final chapter, subtitled "A Preliminary Theoretical Discussion", assembles the findings into a "PA model" of six elements:

1. the mass line ideology
2. rich social capital
3. political activism and contention
4. weak institutions
5. a "hyper-responsive" government
6. and strong regime support

Tang compares the model with the civic culture tradition of Gabriel Almond and Sidney Verba, with studies of bureaucratic authoritarianism and elite power-sharing, and with explanations based on Confucian paternalism. He proposes that it may apply to Vietnam, North Korea, Cuba and post-revolutionary Iran, as well as to populist governments such as those of Juan Perón in Argentina, Hugo Chávez in Venezuela, Vladimir Putin in Russia and Thaksin and Yingluck Shinawatra in Thailand. The author presents the arrangement as inherently unstable because it lacks institutional guarantees: "Satisfying everyone's demands is simply too costly and too exhausting."

== Reception ==
J. David Gillespie found the book "rich in data and valuable in its assertions", an engaging account of why China's party state had proved so durable despite rapid social and economic change. Gillespie summarized Tang's answer as resting on the mass line, on nationalism and on the regime's "hyper-responsiveness" to popular protest, but noted that chronic environmental degradation and corruption, together with a substantial slowdown in economic growth, left the consequences for regime stability unclear. Calling the book "a tour de force in the contemporary literature on development, China, and democratization", Gillespie recommended it for every university library.

According to Jie Lu, the book "sets a new standard for future research on public opinion in China", and Tang had been "rigorous and cautious" in drawing conclusions from data gathered through different research designs. Lu considered the list experiments convincing evidence that political desirability had only a limited effect on Chinese survey responses, so that high regime support could not be dismissed as preference falsification. Tang managed to balance generalizability against attention to context, according to Lu, and allowed readers both to find comparable cases elsewhere and to see the imprint of the Communist Party's revolutionary experience on present-day opinion, and judged the book accessible to graduate and undergraduate students.

Andrew J. Nathan wrote that Tang offered "an intriguing explanation for one of the biggest puzzles in contemporary China": the combination of frequent protest with high survey support for the central government. Nathan summarized the argument that Beijing encouraged locally focused demonstrations and petitioning to stay in touch with public sentiment, and that such protest might generate legitimacy more effectively than elections or a stronger legal system. Of that argument, Nathan concluded that "the case remains circumstantial."

The empirical chapters struck Rory Truex as "somewhat arduous and repetitive to get through, though rewarding in the end." Truex observed that many of the book's individual arguments, such as citizens trusting the center more than local government or protest serving as a source of information for the regime, already existed in the scholarship on China, and located its contribution in gathering them under one concept and subjecting them to further empirical scrutiny. While accepting that the list experiment suggested concerns about preference falsification "may be exaggerated", Truex argued that survey scales can mean different things in different countries, which raised "serious questions" about conclusions drawn from cross-national data, including the finding of exceptionally high interpersonal trust, which Truex's own fieldwork did not seem to bear out. The main objection concerned the concept itself, which in Truex's view lacked precision and a clear referent, leaving readers unsure how to classify regimes meeting only some of its six conditions; Truex nonetheless allowed that the final chapter was explicitly preliminary and that its "intellectual scaffolding" gave other scholars a footing from which to build.

Barrett McCormick called the book "provocative and useful" and expected that even readers who disagreed with its conclusion would find its survey research valuable. McCormick found the list-experiment evidence on respondents' candor persuasive, but noted that much of the data had been gathered in 2008 and 2010, so that the findings were "obviously more persuasive" for that period than for the years under Xi Jinping. The review questioned Tang's claims that the media and the internet were becoming more open and that protests in Tibet and Xinjiang had won a favorable response from Beijing, citing scholarship on rising repression in those regions and on the government's "stability preservation" policies. McCormick suggested that Chinese political culture might be more a product of successful authoritarian management than a source of the regime's legitimacy, in which case the gap between perception and reality could itself become a source of instability.

Praising the literature reviews that preface each argument, Leigh Martindale wrote that they gave the book "a distinct authority on the subject", and that its best moments came when Tang's reading of the data revealed "insightful ironies" about Chinese political culture. Martindale considered the book a challenge to orthodoxies in political science, particularly the assumption that high interpersonal trust and social capital are features of democracies. The reliance on quantitative survey data alone struck Martindale as a weakness: the claim of high interpersonal trust seemed remarkable given the cynicism Martindale had met during fieldwork in China, and some categories were treated as equivalent without explanation, as when interpersonal trust was used as a measure of internal efficacy.

For Yanjun Liu, the book made "a major contribution" to the study of Chinese politics in particular and authoritarian politics in general. Liu singled out its "seamless weaving" of individual attitudes and behavior with institutional and structural processes, and wrote that its extensive and skilled use of survey data set a new standard for research on Chinese public opinion. Liu read the list experiments as confirming that the high level of political trust in the central government and the Party was valid, and recommended the book to anyone interested in Chinese or authoritarian politics.

In Daniel C. Lynch's assessment, Tang was more successful in demonstrating how the populist authoritarian culture operated than in tracing its origins. Lynch expected most readers to find the discussion of survey results "highly illuminating" and called it "an excellent go-to place" for specialists seeking the core body of survey research on China, while noting that some would dispute whether individual beliefs aggregated from surveys could amount to a culture capable of shaping politics. The historical argument drew Lynch's sharpest objections: communes and work units in Maoist China, Lynch wrote, had been "seething with conflict" rather than marked by solidarity and responsive government, and the post-1978 period of reform and opening seemed a more immediate source of present-day attitudes than the Maoist era.

Catherine Owen considered the book "an important and illuminating read" for students of China and of authoritarianism more broadly, and saw its main contribution in challenging the assumption that citizens of authoritarian states are apathetic, alienated and at the mercy of state power. Owen noted that Tang was "careful not to paint too rosy a picture" of the Chinese system, stressing its instability in the absence of elections as a source of legitimacy. Owen doubted, however, that the model could be extended to some of the other cases named in the conclusion, pointing to research that had found low interpersonal trust in post-communist Russia and questioning whether the Russian government was highly responsive to local protest. Other non-democratic East Asian societies with Maoist legacies seemed to Owen a more promising field for testing the model.
