= Political Islam =

Any interpretation of Islam as a source of political identity and action

Political Islam is the interpretation of Islam as a source of political identity and action. It advocates the formation of state and society according to (the advocates understanding of) Islamic principles, where Islam serves as a source of political positions and concepts. Political Islam is generally used interchangeably with the term Islamism by authors inside and outside of academia, and thought of as the political element of the Islamic revival that began in the 20th century, rather than just any form of political activity by Muslims. However, there have also been new attempts to distinguish between Islamism as religiously based political movements and political Islam as a national modern understanding of Islam shared by secular and Islamist actors.

== Development of the term ==
The terminology which is used for the phenomenon of political Islam differs among experts. Martin Kramer was one of the first experts to start using the term political Islam in 1980. In 2003, he stated that political Islam can also be seen as tautology because nowhere in the Muslim world is a religion separated from politics. Some experts use terms like Islamism, pointing out the same set of occurrences or they confuse both terms. Dekmejian was among the first of the experts who made remarks on politicisation of Islam in the context of the failure of secular Islamic governments while he uses both Islamism and fundamentalism at the same time (rather than political Islam).

The term political Islam has been used in connection with foreign communities, referring to the movements or groups which have invested in a broad fundamentalist revival that is connected to a certain political agenda. M. A. Muqtedar Khan incorporates into political Islam all the Islamic movements promoting a political system based solely on Islam which must be followed by every Muslim. Some of the experts also use other descriptive terms in order to distinguish various ideological courses within political Islam: conservative, progressive, militant, radical, jihadist, etc. Bill Warner, a retired professor of physics and critic of political Islam, defines political Islam as that part of the text of the primary Islamic doctrine (Koran, Sira, Hadith) that affect non-Muslims (Kafirs) and non-Muslim societies. He has been criticised for identifying Islam with Islamism and for his methodology. In 2011, the Southern Poverty Law Center included him in a list of ten anti-Islam hardliners in the United States.

== Definitions ==
Islamic scholar Gudrun Krämer, a professor at the Free University of Berlin, writes:

"Political Islam is not synonymous with violent, radical, or extremist Islamism, and it is not restricted to opposition groups. The spectrum ranges from advocates of an Islamic republic to sympathizers of an Islamic monarchy or a resuscitated caliphate, and from self-declared liberals to uncompromising conservatives. Some Islamists are commonly classified as moderate or pragmatic, others as radical, militant, or extremist."

John L. Esposito (Georgetown University) and Emad El-Din Shahin (American University in Cairo) give the following definition in The Oxford Handbook of Islam and Politics:

"In recent years, political Islam has manifested itself in two diametrically opposed orientations: an increasing involvement in the democratization process by mainstream movements after the success of pro-democracy popular uprisings in toppling autocratic regimes and a growing inclination toward violence by fringe groups. Political Islam here refers to the attempts of Muslim individuals, groups and movements to reconstruct the political, economic, social and cultural basis of their society along Islamic lines. This process involves different views of the place of Shari'ah in society and the approach to bringing about change. While majorities of Islamic movements have engaged in the democratization process in their respective countries, some have embraced violence and terrorism as an ideological and strategic choice, with devastating consequences for the world and for Islam itself."

Mouhanad Khorchide (University of Münster), as head of the scientific advisory board of the Documentation Center for Political Islam in Austria, stated in 2020 that the term "Political Islam" should be treated as a technical term and therefore written with a capital 'P'. He devoloped the following definition that is also the working definition of the term by the Documentation Center for Political Islam in Austria:

"Ideology of supremacy that aims at influencing or changing society, culture, state, policy, politics and/or polity according to such values and norms that are declared as Islamic by the actors of Political Islam, but are not shared by the majority of Muslims and are in clear contradiction to the rule of law, democracy and human rights."

The Routledge Handbook of Political Islam provides the following definition by political scientist Shahram Akbarzadeh, a professor at the University of Melbourne:

"Political Islam is a modern phenomenon that seeks to use religion to shape the political system. Its origins lie in the perceived failure of the secular ideologies of nationalism and socialism to deliver on their promises of anti-imperialism and prosperity."

In another paper, Rüdiger Lohlker criticizes numerous assumptions surrounding the discussion on Political Islam:

"All the categories we are discussing are affected by this "dubious" assumption that there is a transhistorical essence of religion. "The most dubious" of all these categories may be Political Islam with its background assumption that "true" religion has to be privatised but ignoring that the privatised need for belief is based on a universalised dominance of Christian traditions in public discourse and institutions. Even if political Catholicism may also be regarded as dubious, the notion ignores the fundamental difference of a phenomenon that strives for political dominance (sometimes successful) in the hegemonic European context. Thus, putting majority aspirations and some strands of minority discourses and organisations at the same level is a major failure of analysis. Talking about Political Islam means that we are referring to the ongoing discussion. To rethink this category and others we should think about Islam as a practice, not a transhistorical spectre of religion called Islam that is haunting the Western imaginaire."

The editors of the Handbook of Political Islam in Europe (2024), the Cologne-based political scientist Thomas Jäger and the director of the European Institute for Counterterrorism and Conflict Prevention (EICTP), Ralph Thiele, offer the following definition:

"Actors of Political Islam pursue the political goals that are derived from the idea that Islam, as they understand it, should play the central role in shaping political, legal, and cultural systems worldwide. While it is a broad and diverse movement with various interpretations, variations, and organizations, there are core characteristics associated with Political Islam in general. The first and most important is the inseparability of religion and politics."

== In Muslim countries ==
Some factions in the Middle East have come to associate the idea of modernities with the intrusions of colonial imperialism. In some Muslim countries, especially Egypt and Pakistan, political counter-movements with religious ideological leanings took root. The reasons are multifaceted. The collapse of the Ottoman Empire was a seismic event that created many aftershocks. The region experienced turbulence for many years as Arab countries fell within the cultural and colonial sphere of European nations. Under increasing cultural pressures Muslims asserted their national identities and cultural heritage, and some factions emphasized religious dimensions. In Egypt the weakness of Muslims was blamed on poor adherence to scripture. According to Hassan al-Banna, European culture was materialistic, immoral and based on class selfishness and usury. Other contributing factors may have been opposition to modernizing influences, overall poor governance and low levels of education in the population.

=== Iran ===
The Cultural Revolution (Persian: انقلاب فرهنگی, romanized: Enqelāb-e Farhangi; 1980–1983) was a period following the Iranian Revolution, when the academia of Iran was purged of Western and non-Islamic influences (including traditionalist unpolitical Islamic doctrines) to align them with the revolutionary and political Islam. The cultural revolution sometimes involved violence in taking over the university campuses, as higher education in Iran had many secular and leftist forces who were opposed to Ayatollah Khomeini's Islamic state in Iran. The official name used by the Islamic Republic is "Cultural Revolution".

=== Sudan ===
Political Islam shaped Sudan’s state and security apparatus most decisively under Omar al-Bashir’s Islamist regime, which used tamkeen (“empowerment”) to place loyalists in the civil service, judiciary, economy, and security institutions, while also expanding militias to bolster regime survival and weaken independent centers of power. Analysts also describe the Sudanese Islamist movement as having embedded itself in the officer corps over time, giving it enduring influence inside the armed forces and helping explain why Islamist networks remained relevant after Bashir’s 2019 removal and during the 2023 war.

The current wartime governing camp also includes many figures and networks associated with Bashir, which helps explain why Islamist influence has remained visible in both civilian and military circles. Islamist networks have long influenced the Sudanese Armed Forces, especially since the Bashir era, when the Muslim Brotherhood and related currents gained deep access to state and security institutions. In the current war, multiple reports say Burhan depends on Islamist-aligned factions and militias for battlefield support, which has allowed Islamist actors to regain leverage inside the military and the broader political order.

== Research in Austria ==
In July 2020, the Austrian government made up of the ÖVP and the Greens set up the Documentation Center Political Islam (DCPI), an organization to research "religiously motivated political extremism" related to political Islam and to monitor related networks and social media. It was financed by the Austrian Foundation and through the 2015 Fund Act.

In the wake of the Mahsa Amini protests in Iran, the DCPI produced a report on the efforts of the Islamic Republic to exert influence abroad in the cultural, religious and educational sectors in Europe through foundations and religious centers, including the Islamic Center in Hamburg and the Imam Ali Center in Vienna. In 2022, the organization also investigated the Islamic Association in Austria, an organization that runs a mosque in Vienna's Jewish neighbourhood that is allegedly responsible for propagating antisemitism, anti-Israel hatred, and support for Hamas and the Muslim Brotherhood.

In fall of 2026 the DCPI published the yearly report for 2025 showing that influencers have taken over from preachers. Based on differences in legal status between religious and other facilities in Austria, DCPI-head Lisa Fellhofer pointed to the fact that the Islamic Religious Organization (IGGÖ, Körperschaft des öffentlichen Rechts) could revoke a facility’s status as a mosque, while the facility could still remain open under association law (Vereinsrecht).

== Research in Europe ==
In 2024 the Handbook of Political Islam in Europe with references to more than 20 European countries was published focusing on European security perspectives. The Italian Institute for International Political Studies in 2025 distinguished between moderate and confrontational manifestations of political Islam writing that "the emergence of Muslim groups, engaged in either religious outreach or political activism, alongside global geopolitical changes, has placed this interpretation of Islam at the forefront of political, media, and social debates."

Political Islam in Europe is a complex and evolving phenomenon that intersects with issues of identity, security, culture, secularism, democracy, racism and governance. While political Islam manifests in various forms, ranging from democratic engagement to radical extremism, European responses must be nuanced and multifaceted. (Mohamed-Ali Adraoui)

== See also ==
- Political aspects of Islam
- Al-Ahkam al-Sultaniyyah
- Al-Siyasa al-Shar'iyya fi Islah al-Ra'i wa al-Ra'iyya
- List of religions and spiritual traditions
- Post-Islamism
- Islam Yes, Islamic Party No
- List of Islamic political parties
- Politics and Islam
