= Akbarzadeh =

Akbarzadeh is a surname. Notable people with the surname include:

- Pejman Akbarzadeh (born 1980), Iranian musician, researcher, journalist, and radio producer
- Shahram Akbarzadeh, Australian academic
