= Wenfang Tang =

Chinese political scientist

- 唐文方
- Education: Peking University (1982 BA); University of Kansas (1985 MA); University of Chicago (1990 PhD)
- Known for: Comparative Politics and Chinese Politics
- Scientific career
- Fields: Public Opinion, Political Culture, Authoritarianism, and Survey
- Workplaces: The Chinese University of Hong Kong, Shenzhen

Wenfang Tang (Chinese: 唐文方) is a political scientist and expert in Chinese politics. He is currently a Presidential Chair Professor and the dean of the School of Humanities and Social Science at the Chinese University of Hong Kong, Shenzhen. Prior to this, he held positions at the University of Pittsburgh, the University of Iowa, and the Hong Kong University of Science and Technology.

== Education and career ==
In 1977, the People's Republic of China reinstated the National Higher Education Entrance Examination (Gaokao) that had been suspended for 10 years due to the Cultural Revolution. That year, Tang was admitted to Peking University's Department of International Politics. After his graduation from Peking University in 1982, he went to the United States for graduate studies and earned an MA in political science from the University of Kansas in 1985 and a PhD in political science from the University of Chicago in 1990.

Between 1990 and 2009, Tang started his academic career in the Department of Political Science at the University of Pittsburgh, where he rose through the ranks of assistant professor, associate professor, and full professor. Between 2009 and 2019, he worked at the University of Iowa and was appointed the C. Maxwell and Elisabeth M. Stanley Hua Hsia Professor of Political Science and International Studies and the Chair of the Department of Political Science. In 2019, Tang moved to Hong Kong, and served as the Head and Chair Professor in the Division of Social Science at the Hong Kong University of Science and Technology until 2022. In March 2022, he joined the Chinese University of Hong Kong, Shenzhen in Mainland China, where has since then been a Presidential Chair Professor and the Dean of the School of Humanities and Social Science.

== Academic work ==
Tang is known for his works in comparative politics and Chinese politics. He mainly focuses on public opinion, political culture, authoritarianism, and survey methods.

Tang's research is seen in journals such as American Journal of Political Science, Political Research Quarterly, Political Communication, Journal of Public Policy, China Quarterly, and Journal of Contemporary China. He has also published several monographs, including Public Opinion and Political Change in China (Stanford University Press), Populist Authoritarianism: Chinese Political Culture and Regime Sustainability (Oxford University Press), etc.

== Academic services ==
Tang is the Specialty Chief Editor of the Frontiers in Political Science's Comparative Governance section, as well as members of the editorial boards of Political Psychology and Advances in Political Psychology. Tang also serves as a member and officer of the International Political Science Association's research committee of Comparative Public Opinion Research (RC17).

== Awards ==
Tang's 2016 book, Populist Authoritarianism: Chinese Political Culture and Regime Sustainability, won the 2016 Choice Outstanding Academic Titles.
