= Steven C. Roach =

American academic

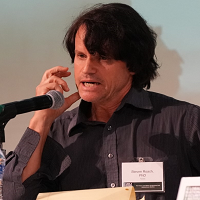
- Born: Steven C. Roach; November 1, 1964 (age 62)

Education
- Education: Colgate University (B.A.); San Francisco State University (M.A.); University of Denver (Ph.D.)

Philosophical work
- Institutions: University of South Florida
- Main interests: International relations, human rights, critical theory, global ethics, and East African politics

Steven C. Roach (born November 1, 1964) is an American professor of International Relations who is best known for his work on the politics of the International Criminal Court, the emergence and application of critical international theory, and South Sudan's politics. He is currently Professor of International Relations and former Director of Graduate Programs (Ph.D. MA, MLA. MALACS) at the School of Interdisciplinary Global Studies at the University of South Florida.

== Education and Career ==
Roach earned his doctorate from the Josef Korbel School of International Studies at the University of Denver in 2002. He received his M.A from San Francisco State University in 1995 and his BA from Colgate University in 1987. From 2002 to 2005 he was appointed visiting professor at Colorado State University at Pueblo and a visiting lecturer at the University of Colorado Boulder. From 2002-2005, he served as a Visiting Professor of International Relations at Colorado State University-Pueblo and Instructor of International Affairs at the University of Colorado-Boulder. He was appointed Assistant Professor of International Relations in 2005 and later appointed Full Professor in 2018. At the Universidad Autónoma de Madrid, Spain, he served as Honorary Professor from 2020-21.

== Research ==
A central focus of Roach's work is the interaction of ethical values and political power. His recent work uses the relationship between decency and moral accountability to study the growing political pressures that threaten the liberal international order. In a 2016 interview with E-IR, he points out that the gap between humanitarian values and emotion has never been greater; that it is not simply the hostile emotions that explain right-wing populism, but liberalism's detachment from these sentiments. In his three books on critical international theory, he traces the roots of critical international theory, showing the epistemological and practical interventions of international theory in critical theory. His interest in the normativity of international theory eventually led to the published volume, Moral Responsibility in Twenty First Century Warfare, in which he formulates the notion of dual responsibility to study the novel tensions between just war theory and the application of Autonomous Weapons Systems (AWS).

Roach is one of the first political scientists to systematically explore the political forces shaping the International Criminal Court. His notion of political legalism functions as a pragmatic instrument to study how best to bring justice to the worst perpetrators of serious crimes. In an article published by Global Governance, he argues that the court cannot escape the effects of operating in an international system. It needs to confront this difficult and complex political reality of the ICC by devising new ways of thinking about its agency and by adopting the political strategies needed to balance the demand for global justice against the constraints of the international system.

Roach also has conducted extensive field research in South Sudan and written on the many challenges facing the country, including corruption, food insecurity, accountability, and extreme violence. His articles and short essays have appeared in International Affairs, Foreign Affairs, and African Arguments. In 2023, he authored South Sudan's Fateful Struggle, which, in providing a sweeping account of the country’s enduring state of war, formulates the concept of militarized patronage to study the country’s radically militarized society and state.

Overall, his works have been translated into Arabic, Chinese, French, Persian, Russian, Spanish, and Turkish. with two of his books, International Relations: the Key Concepts and Critical Theory and International Relations, becoming bestsellers in the field of international relations.

== Recognition ==
In 2022, he was the recipient of an Outstanding Faculty Award, Global Excellence Award and the Theodor and Venette Askounes-Ashford Distinguished Scholar Award. Prior to this he was awarded a Fulbright Scholar grant to teach and research at the Universidad Autónoma de Madrid, where he was recognized as Honorary Professor. In 2020, he was appointed Country Expert of the United States Agency for International Development (USAID) Democracy, Human Rights, and Governance (DRG) assessment team in South Sudan. The team's assessment report was presented to the U.S. State Department and Congress and now serves as the basis of USAID’s five-year strategic mission in the country. He is currently a member of several editorial and consultancy boards. Two of his books, South Sudan’s Fateful Struggle and Moral Responsibility in Twenty-First Century Warfare, were the recipients of CHOICE Magazine’s Outstanding Academic Title (2021, 2024).

== Selected publications ==
=== Books ===
- South Sudan's Fateful Struggle: Building Peace in a State of War. New York: Oxford University Press, 2023. ISBN 9780190057862
- Nile Basin Politics: From Coordinated to Cooperative Peace (eds). Cheltenham, UK: Edward Elgar Publishing, 2025, with Derrick K Hudson and Kaleb Demerew. ISBN 978-1-80392-716-9
- Moral Responsibility in Twenty-First Century Warfare: Just War Theory and the Ethical Challenges of Autonomous Weapons Systems (eds). Albany, NY: SUNY Press, with Amy E. Eckert, 2020. ISBN 9781438480015
- Handbook of Critical International Relations (ed). Cheltenham, UK: Edward Elgar Publishing, 2020. ISBN 9781788112888
- Decency and Difference: Humanity and the Global Challenge of Identity Politics. Ann Arbor, MI: University of Michigan Press. 2019. ISBN 9780472131624
- The Challenge of Governance in South Sudan: Corruption, Peacebuilding, and Foreign Intervention (eds), London and New York: Routledge, 2019, with Derrick K. Hudson. ISBN 9781138067752.
- International Relations: The Key Concepts. Third and Second Edition. London and New York: Routledge, 2014, 2009, with Martin Griffiths and Terry O'Callaghan ISBN 9780415844949 (Chinese translation, Peking University Press, 2015; Turkish translation, Nobel Academic Press, 2013, Arabic translation, Gulf Research Center, 2009).
- Critical Theory of International Politics: Complementarity, Justice, and Governance. London and New York: Routledge. 2010. ISBN 9780415774857
- Governance, Order, and the International Criminal Court: Between Realpolitik and a Cosmopolitan Court (ed.). Oxford: Oxford University Press, 2009. ISBN 9780199546732.
- Fifty Key Thinkers in International Relations. London and New York: Routledge, 2009, with Martin Griffiths and M. Scott Solomon, 2009. ISBN 9780415775717 (Portuguese translation, University of Recife, 2005; Turkish translation, Nobel Academic Press, 2011; Persian Translation, University of Tehran Press, 2014).
- Critical Theory and International Relations: A Reader (ed.). London and New York: Routledge.2009. ISBN 9780415954198
- Politicizing the International Criminal Court: The Convergence of Politics, Ethics, and Law. Lanham, MD: Rowman & Littlefield Publishers. 2006 ISBN 9780742541047.
- Cultural Autonomy, Minority Rights, and Globalization. London and New York: Routledge. 2005 ISBN 9780754645009.

=== Articles ===
- South Sudan: A Volatile Dynamic of Accountability and Peace, International Affairs, 2016.
- How Political is the ICC? Pressing Challenges and the Need for Diplomatic Efficacy, Global Governance, 2013.
- Critical International Theory and Meta-Dialectics: Fourth Debate or Fifth Dimension? Millennium, 2007.
- Arab States and the Role of Islam in the International Criminal Court, Political Studies, 2005.
- Minority Rights and an Emergent International Right to Autonomy: A Normative and Historical Assessment,” The International Journal on Minority and Group Rights, 2004.
