= Bill Warner (writer) =

American critic of Islam and former physics professor (born 1941)

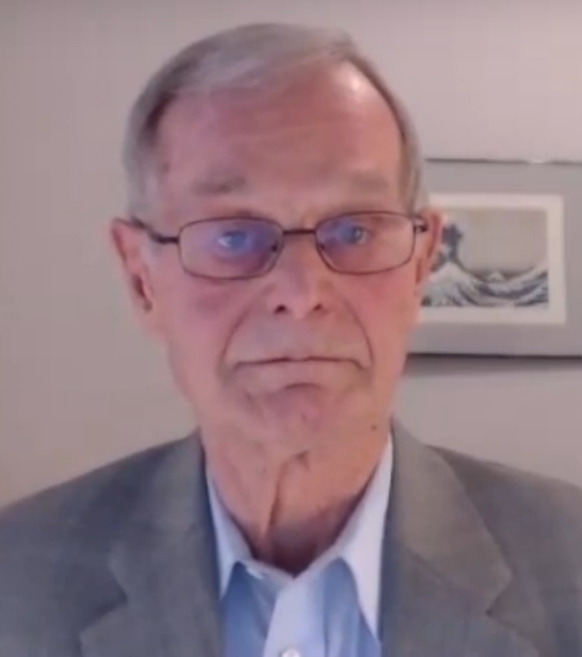
- Bill Warner in 2019
- Born: Bill French; 1941 (age 84–85)
- Education: North Carolina State University (PhD)
- Occupations: Founder and President of the Center for the Study of Political Islam International (CSPII)
- Writing career
- Subjects: Writer, former physicist
- Website: politicalislam.com

Bill Warner is the pen name of Bill French (born 1941), a former physics professor and anti-Islam writer. He founded the Center for the Study of Political Islam International, which is based in the Czech Republic. He has been described as a part of the counter-jihad movement.

== Biography ==
Warner was a professor of physics at Tennessee State University. He does not have an academic background in religious studies. He participated in the Murfreesboro protests where he spoke to a group of opponents of the mosque and sold his books. The protests included a legal case arguing that Islam is not a religion. Warner instead regards Islam and Sharia law as a "totalitarian ideology".

== Reception ==
The Southern Poverty Law Center in 2011 described him as one of a core group of ten anti-Islam hardliners in the United States.

Middlebury Institute professor and terrorism expert Jeffrey M. Bale refers to Warner as an example of writers who identify Islam with Islamism. According to Bale, these writers relate all the characteristics associated with Islamism with Islam as a whole, alleging that "such characteristics are intrinsic to Islam itself, and therefore that Islamism and jihadism are simply logical extensions - or simple applications in practice - of the authentic tenets and core values of Islam." He argues that, what they "fail to acknowledge is that these particular interpretations are by no means the only possible interpretations of core Islamic doctrines, traditions, and values, nor are they necessarily the most authentic, valid, or widely shared interpretations." This he says, is like claiming that Christian Reconstructionism is identical to Christianity.

American Muslim religious liberty lawyer Asma Uddin considers groups like Warner and his organization as anti-Muslim entities that mainstream the idea that Islam is not just a religion but also a political ideology which aids in legitimizing restricting the religious freedom of American Muslims. Warner's organization has said that “Statistics show that Islamic politics is what brought Islam success, not religion” and journalist Uddin described the organization's statement that Islam is mainly a political ideology as "pseudoscience and these quote, unquote ‘think tanks’... are responding to the work of actual legitimate think tanks using the language of statistics."

Zafar Iqbal, professor at Pakistan's International Islamic University, has compared Warner to Geert Wilders in that both consider Islam to be a totalitarian political ideology demanding complete submission.

Czech politician Jiří Kobza lists 4 publications by Warner in his "list of the most important books that every citizen should read".

== Center for the Study of Political Islam International ==
The Center for the Study of Political Islam International (CSPII), based in the Czech Republic, was formed by Warner and Milan Podlipný from the Czech Republic in 2014. According to its website it has branches in 11 countries.

The Southern Poverty Law Center states that the CSPII ran two lectures in the Czech Republic in 2017 where lecturers described "Muslims as being encouraged to promote principles in contradiction with a European understanding of human rights."

The Council on American–Islamic Relations has described the CSPI as Islamophobic, listing it as part of the" U.S.-based Islamophobia network’s inner core".

The Czech branch distributed one of Warner's books to the Slovak National Council in 2016. Luboš Kropáček, a Czech Islamologist at Charles University stated that "As far as I know, no Orientalist, Arabist or Islamologist pays attention to this man, he has no business in our field of science." Bronislav Ostřanský, a researcher at the Oriental Institute, ASCR, said that his apparently scientific approach impresses many people "including otherwise educated and politically influential personalities" but that he should be quoted "in a professional work in only one context, namely as relevant source material for the study of contemporary Islamophobia."

== See also ==
- Political Islam

== Bibliography ==
- Sharia Law for Non-Muslims. Centre for the Study of Political Islam. 2015. ISBN 978-0-9795794-8-6.
- The Hadith. Center for the Study of Political Islam. 2016. ISBN 978-1-936659-01-2.
- A Two-Hour Koran. Center for the Study of Political Islam. 2016. ISBN 978-1-936659-02-9.
- The Life of Mohammed. Center for the Study of Political Islam. 2016. ISBN 978-1-936659-06-7.
- Measuring Mohammed. Center for the Study of Political Islam. 2019. ISBN 978-1-936659-38-8.
