= International Futures =

Assessment model for global systems

Logo

International Futures (IFs) is a global integrated assessment model designed to help with thinking strategically and systematically about key global systems (economic, demographic, education, health, environment, technology, domestic governance, infrastructure, agriculture, energy and environment). It is housed at the Frederick S. Pardee Center for International Futures. Initially created by Barry B. Hughes of the Josef Korbel School of International Studies at the University of Denver in Colorado, the model is free for public use in both its online and downloadable forms.

The Pardee Center for International Futures has partnered with many organizations to produce forecasts and data analysis. IFs has been utilized in the National Intelligence Council's Global Trends 2020, Global Trends 2025, and Global Trends 2030 report. The International Futures model has also contributed to the United Nations Human Development Report and the Global Environmental Outlook.

IFs is hosted free for public use by Google Public Data Explorer, the Atlantic Council, and the Institute for Security Studies.

== Model structure ==
The model incorporates dynamically linked sub-models. They include population, economic, agricultural, educational, energy, sociopolitical, international political, environmental, health, infrastructure and technology. IFs is a unique modeling tool because it endogenizes the impact of such a wide range of global systems for 183 countries.

The help system that accompanies the software provides an extensive overview of the model structure and computer code used to write the style. IFs have three main functions, all connected to its conceptual treatment of integrated assessment forecasts: data analysis, scenario analysis, and display.

== Data analysis ==
Example of cross-sectional analysis of total fertility rate and GDP per capita at purchasing power parity

The data analysis section of IFs represents a collection of over 2,000 data series from all major international data gatherers. It is constantly updated with new data series. This data forms the foundation of the model structure. Users can analyze historic data cross-sectionally, longitudinally or on a world map. Using cross-sectional analysis, users can select a variables and plot this against up to 5 independent variables. It is then possible to animate the map to see how the cross-sectional relationship changes across the 40+ years of data in the database. Longitudinally, users can plot the relationship between a dependent variable and time, from 1960 (for most data series) through the most recent data year available. A world map allows users to display data from any of these series using GIS options.

== Scenario analysis ==
Forecast of world population for four UNEP scenarios from 1960–2100

The software allows users to access and change the parameters and variables that are used in the model. The Scenario Analysis set out lets users create their own global scenario or load a pre-run global scenario in their field of interest. For example, to analyze the effects of a policy intervention on different sub-models and variables within the model, make the changes to the appropriate variable and then analyze the results in comparison to the base-case. Many pre-run scenarios come packaged with the model, including work that has been completed for the United Nations Environment Programme and the National Intelligence Council.

== Display ==
Example of mortality display for Belgium in 2025

This portion of the software allows users to display the forecast results of their scenario analyses for different provinces, countries and groups across different issue areas. Some of the specialized displays include: population, educational attainment, mortality rate, World Values Survey, Gini coefficient, the Millennium Development Goals, social accounting matrix, advanced sustainability analysis, and World Bank financial flows.

== Pardee Center for International Futures ==
The project received a gift from Frederick S. Pardee, formerly of RAND, to construct the Pardee Center for International Futures at the University of Denver. It is responsible for the further institutionalization of the software, training sessions, and the continued work on the Patterns of Potential Human Progress (PPHP) volumes. The first PPHP volume discusses reduction in global poverty; the second, global education; the third, health care systems; the fourth, global infrastructure; the fifth, domestic governance.

The journal Poverty and Public Policy reviewed the first PPHP volume, and concluded the following:

For all their fine effort in data assembly and analysis, Hughes et al. intended that their first volume's main contribution should be one not of prediction, but of promoting thought about poverty policy. Their attractively presented and lucid volume succeeds in this endeavor; it very usefully fulfills its promise to the student and policymaker.

== African Futures Project ==
The African Futures Project is a collaboration between the Institute for Security Studies and the Pardee Center for International Futures to promote long term strategic planning for African development. This collaboration has led to the publication of various African Futures Project Policy Briefs, monographs on long-term African Development and a website where the IFs model can be used specifically for exploring African development.
