= Guy Padgett =

American mayor

Mayor of Casper, Wyoming
- In office 2005–2006
- Preceded by: Barbara E. Watters
- Succeeded by: Renee R. Burgess

Member, Casper City Council
- In office 2003–2009
- Succeeded by: Glenn Januska

Personal details
- Born: August 20, 1977 (age 49)
- Party: Democratic
- Education: University of Wyoming (BA); University of Denver (MA)

Guy V. Padgett III (born 1977) is a former American municipal politician from Wyoming. A member of the Casper, Wyoming, City Council from 2003 to 2009, he was mayor of Casper from 2005 to 2006. He is a Democrat.

He came out as gay while on the city council in 2003, becoming the state's first openly gay elected official. Despite Wyoming's reputation for being politically conservative and the murder of Casper native Matthew Shepard in nearby Laramie in 1998, Padgett was unanimously elected mayor by the council in 2005. He reportedly enjoyed great popularity among his constituents, including support from prominent Republican Party politicians such as Alan K. Simpson. In addition he was, at 27, Casper's youngest mayor.

He was re-elected to the city council in 2006; he resigned his seat June 30, 2009, upon admission to a master's degree program at the University of Denver's Josef Korbel School of International Studies. His resignation left only one openly gay elected official in Wyoming: state representative Cathy Connolly (D–Laramie).

Political offices
Preceded by Barbara E. Watters	Mayor of Casper; 2005-2006	Succeeded by Renee R. Burgess
