= Susan Waltz =

American political scientist

Susan E. Waltz
- Education: University of Denver (Josef Korbel School) (Ph.D.)
- Known for: Human rights
- Scientific career
- Fields: International relations Political science
- Workplaces: University of Michigan; Amnesty International

Susan E. Waltz is an American political scientist and faculty member at the University of Michigan's Ford School of Public Policy. Waltz is also involved with Amnesty International, having served as chair of its International Executive Committee from 1996 to 1998. From 2009 to 2013 she served as a board member at Amnesty's U.S. branch.

== Education ==
Waltz received her Ph.D. from the Josef Korbel School of International Studies at the University of Denver in 1981.

== Professional work ==
Waltz has previously served as chair of Amnesty International's International Executive Committee and is a board member of the organization's U.S. operations. She has published several articles related to small arms trading as well as human rights issues in North Africa. She is considered an expert on Tunisia, Morocco and Algeria, and her publications have appeared in academic journals including World Policy Journal and Human Rights Quarterly. She is co-author of the website Human Rights Advocacy and the History of International Human Rights Standards, hosted by University of Michigan.
