= Suisheng Zhao =

Chinese-American political scientist

- 赵穗生
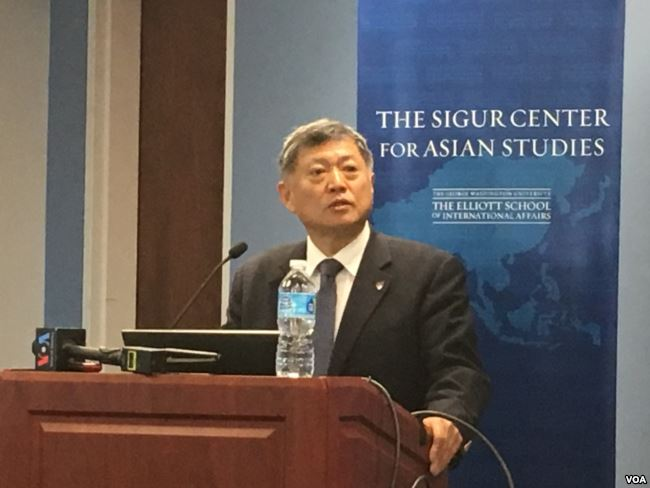
- Zhao in 2016
- Born: Guangzhou, China

Education
- Education: Peking University (BSc and MSc in Economics); University of Missouri (MA in Sociology); University of California, San Diego (MA & PhD in Political Science)
- Thesis: The Politics of Institutional Design: The Choice between Presidential and Cabinet Government in Nationalist China, 1925-1937 (1992)
- Doctoral advisor: Susan Shirk

Philosophical work
- Era: 20-21 centuries
- School: Constructivism
- Institutions: Josef Korbel School of International Studies, University of Denver
- Doctoral students: Gregory J. Moore
- Main interests: Chinese Nationalism, Chinese Foreign Policy, Beijing Consensus, East Asian Regionalism and Xi Jinping Thought on Diplomacy

Suisheng Zhao (Chinese: 赵穗生; born September 17, 1954) is a Chinese-American political scientist currently serving as professor of Chinese politics and foreign policy at the University of Denver's Josef Korbel School of International Studies. He directs the school's Center for China–US Cooperation, and is the founding editor and editor-in-chief of the Journal of Contemporary China.

== Education ==
Zhao received a BA and MA in economics from Peking University, and subsequently completed a second MA in sociology from the University of Missouri. Zhao earned his PhD in political science from the University of California, San Diego.

== Academic career ==
Prior to joining the University of Denver, Zhao was an associate professor of political science at Washington College and an associate professor of East Asian politics at Colby College.

== Research ==
Zhao writes that the rise of "state-led pragmatic nationalism" in 1990s China was an instrumental response to the dissolution of the Soviet Union.

Writing on the discourse of a China model, Zhao observes that three waves of discourse have occurred: in 2004 following Joshua Cooper Ramo's publication of an article about the "Beijing consensus", in 2008-2009 following China's success in responding to the global financial crisis and its mobilization of nationwide resources for the 2008 Beijing Olympics, and in 2012 following Xi Jinping's promotion of the China Dream concept.

Zhao contends that since 2008, China has become increasingly assertive in foreign affairs, particularly in its relations with the United States, Europe, and Asia-Pacific countries. Zhao attributes this increased assertiveness in part to China's efforts to restore itself from a self-perceived position of victimhood in international affairs. Zhao writes that China's dissatisfaction with the US-led global order arises from China's position within that order, rather than with the structure of the order itself.

== Publications ==
=== Monographs ===
- The Dragon Roars Back: Transformational Leaders and Dynamics of Chinese Foreign Policy (2023)
- A Nation-State by Construction: Dynamics of Modern Chinese Nationalism (2004)
- Power Competition in East Asia: From the Old Chinese World Order to Post-cold War Regional Multipolarity (1998, St. Martin's Press)
- Power by Design: Constitution-Making in Nationalist China (1995)

=== Edited volumes ===
- The Making of China's Foreign Policy in the 21st century: Historical Sources, Institutions/Players, and Perceptions of Power Relations (2018)
- China’s Big Power Ambition under Xi Jinping: Narratives and Driving Forces (2021)
- China’s Global Reach: The Belt and Road Initiative (BRI) and Asian Infrastructure Investment Bank (AIIB), Volume II (2020)
- China’s New Global Strategy: The Belt and Road Initiative (BRI) and Asian Infrastructure Investment Bank (AIIB), Volume I (2019)
- Chinese Authoritarianism in the Information Age: Internet, Media, and Public Opinion (2019)
- Debating Regime Legitimacy in Contemporary China: Popular Protests and Regime Performances (2018)
- China in Africa: Strategic Motives and Economic Interests (2017)
- Construction of Chinese Nationalism in the Early 21st Century: Domestic Sources and International Implications (2014)
- China’s Search for Energy Security: Domestic Sources and International Implications (2014)
- China and East Asian Regionalism: Economic and Security Cooperation and Institution-Building (2012)
- China and the United States: Cooperation and Competition in Northeast Asia (2008)
- China-US Relations Transformed: Perspectives and Strategic Interactions (2007)
- Debating Political Reform in China: Rule of Law versus Democratization (2006, M.E.Sharpe)
- Chinese Foreign Policy: Pragmatism and Strategic Behavior (2003, M.E.Sharpe)
- China and Democracy: Reconsidering the Prospects for a Democratic China (2000)
- Across the Taiwan Strait: Mainland China, Taiwan, and the Crisis of 1995-96 (1999)

=== Co-edited volumes ===
- Decision-making in Deng's China: Perspectives from Insiders (Studies on Contemporary China (M.E. Sharpe Paperback)) (2019)
- Grassroots Elections in China (2014)
- In Search of China’s Development Model: Beyond the Beijing Consensus (2011)

=== Articles ===
- "From Affirmative to Assertive Patriots: Nationalism in Xi Jinping’s China." The Washington Quarterly44.4 (2021): 141-161.
- "Rethinking the Chinese World Order: The Imperial Cycle and the Rise of China." Journal of Contemporary China 24.96 (2015): 961-982.
- "Foreign Policy Implications of Chinese Nationalism Revisited: The Strident Turn." Journal of Contemporary China 22.82 (2013): 535-553.
- "The China Model: Can It Replace the Western Model of Modernization?." Journal of Contemporary China 19.65 (2010): 419-436.
- "China’s Global Search for Energy Security: Cooperation and Competition in Asia–Pacific." Journal of Contemporary China 17.55 (2008): 207-227.
- "China's Pragmatic Nationalism: Is It Manageable?." The Washington Quarterly 29.1 (2005): 131-144.
- "Chinese Nationalism and Its International Orientations." Political Science Quarterly 115.1 (2000): 1-33.
- "A State-led Nationalism: The Patriotic Education Campaign in Post-Tiananmen China." Communist and Post-communist Studies 31.3 (1998): 287-302.
- "Chinese Intellectuals′ Quest for National Greatness and Nationalistic Writing in the 1990s." The China Quarterly 152 (1997): 725-745.
- "Deng Xiaoping's Southern Tour: Elite Politics in Post-Tiananmen China." Asian Survey 33.8 (1993): 739-756.
