= Institute for Security Studies =

Think tank in Pretoria, South Africa

- Founded: 1991; 35 years ago
- Founders: Jakkie Cilliers, PB Mertz
- Type: Nonprofit organization
- Purpose: Enhance human security as a means to achieve sustainable peace and prosperity in Africa.
- Location: Block C, Brooklyn Court, 361 Veale Street, Nieuw Muckleneuk, Pretoria, 0181, South Africa
- Coordinates: 25.7733930°S 28.2349012°E
- Region served: Africa
- Method: Research, advocacy, policy analysis, technical assistance for both governments and civil society
- Executive Director (Acting): Amelia Broodryk
- Chairperson of the Board of Trustees: Jakkie Cilliers
- Revenue: R217 million (2019)
- Expenses: R226 million (2019)
- Employees: 129 (2019)
- Website: issafrica.org

The Institute for Security Studies, also known as ISS or ISS Africa (to distinguish itself from other similarly named institutes in other parts of the world), is a nonprofit organisation based in South Africa. It has described itself as follows: "an African organisation which aims to enhance human security on the continent. It does independent and authoritative research, provides expert policy analysis and advice, and delivers practical training and technical assistance." Their areas of research include transnational crimes, migration, maritime security, development, peacekeeping, peacebuilding, crime prevention, criminal justice, conflict analysis and governance. It is the largest independent research institute in Africa dealing with human security and is headquartered in Pretoria, South Africa, with offices in Kenya, Ethiopia and Senegal. In 2019, it was ranked 116th by the Global Go To Think Tanks Report and 55th among think tanks outside the United States.

== History ==
The institute was originally established as the Institute for Defence Policy in 1991 by Jakkie Cilliers and PB Mertz. In 1996, it was renamed the Institute for Security Studies and the organisation shifted its research focus from South Africa to Africa as a whole. Cilliers served the South African Defence Force (SADF) during apartheid in the 1970s and 1980s, reaching the rank of commandant, then became an apartheid state security official before founding the ISS. The Institute for Security Studies began with a focus in civil-military relations and democratic reform in the waning years of apartheid South Africa, but has since evolved to encompass a wide range of issue areas of human security across Africa, including: human rights, arms control, corruption and governance, climate change, and crime and criminal justice. Since its inception, the Institute for Security Studies has grown into a pan-African research institution, partnering with the African Union, the East African Community, the Lake Chad Basin Commission, the Southern African Development Community, and a host of governments, institutions, and organisations throughout the world.

== Funding ==
According to its co-founder Jakkie Cilliers, who remains chairperson of the board as of 2023, the ISS (originally IDP) has been funded from its inception by the German Hanns Seidel Foundation, Anglo American Chairman's Fund and De Beers Chairmans Fund. The ISS is now funded largely by foreign governments and organisations; its website lists the following as its major donors: European Union, Government of Denmark, Government of Ireland, Government of the Netherlands, Government of Norway, Government of Sweden, Hanns Seidel Foundation, Open Society Foundations. It also receives project funding from a larger group of donors.

== Areas of study ==
ISS states that it studies the sociopolitics of Africa ranging from governance and organised crime through to armed conflict.

== Partnerships ==
ISS is a regional partner of the United Nations Office on Drugs and Crime (UNODC), and they are currently working together on the implementation of the United Nations Convention against Corruption (UNCAC). ISS is also a member of the United Nations Crime Prevention and Crime Justice Network (part of the UNODC).

The institute has engaged with the African Union on various platforms. ISS was a research partner with the African Union Commission in the Year of Peace and Security in 2010. Additionally, the ISS website hosts as a repository for African Union documents, dating back to 1990. Finally, ISS collaborates with the African Union Peace and Security Council to produce a monthly report on the security challenges and opportunities that face the continent.

== Corruption and Governance Programme ==
In 2010, the Corruption and Governance programme of the Institute for Security Studies launched the Who Owns What? database. This is an extensive, open-source database of disclosure forms of the assets and interests of South African politicians, in an effort to increase transparency of public officials. The Who Owns What? Database has been used to hold South African politicians accountable for their private interests.

== African Futures Project ==
The African Futures Project is a collaboration between the Institute for Security Studies and the Frederick S. Pardee Center for International Futures to promote long-term strategic thinking for the African continent across a broad range of key global systems. The African Futures Project has produced monographs on long-term African development, as well as a quarterly policy brief series that addresses specific development issues, such as the future of traffic accidents and fatalities or the implications of a Green Revolution for Africa.

== Reception ==
ISS is listed as a prominent organisation in Africa in independent listings.

The views of ISS staff have been cited and referenced in news stories in the African press, in connection with the Chibok schoolgirl kidnapping and in other contexts. It has also been cited in some non-African publications, such as the New York Times, the Wall Street Journal, and The Economist.

== See also ==
- Hanns Seidel Foundation
- Pardee Center for International Futures
- European Union Institute for Security Studies
- Centre for Defence and International Security Studies
- Centre for Democracy and Development
- International Relations and Security Network
- Institute for Human Rights and Development in Africa (IHRDA)
- Stockholm International Peace Research Institute
