= Francisco Rodríguez (economist) =

Venezuelan economist

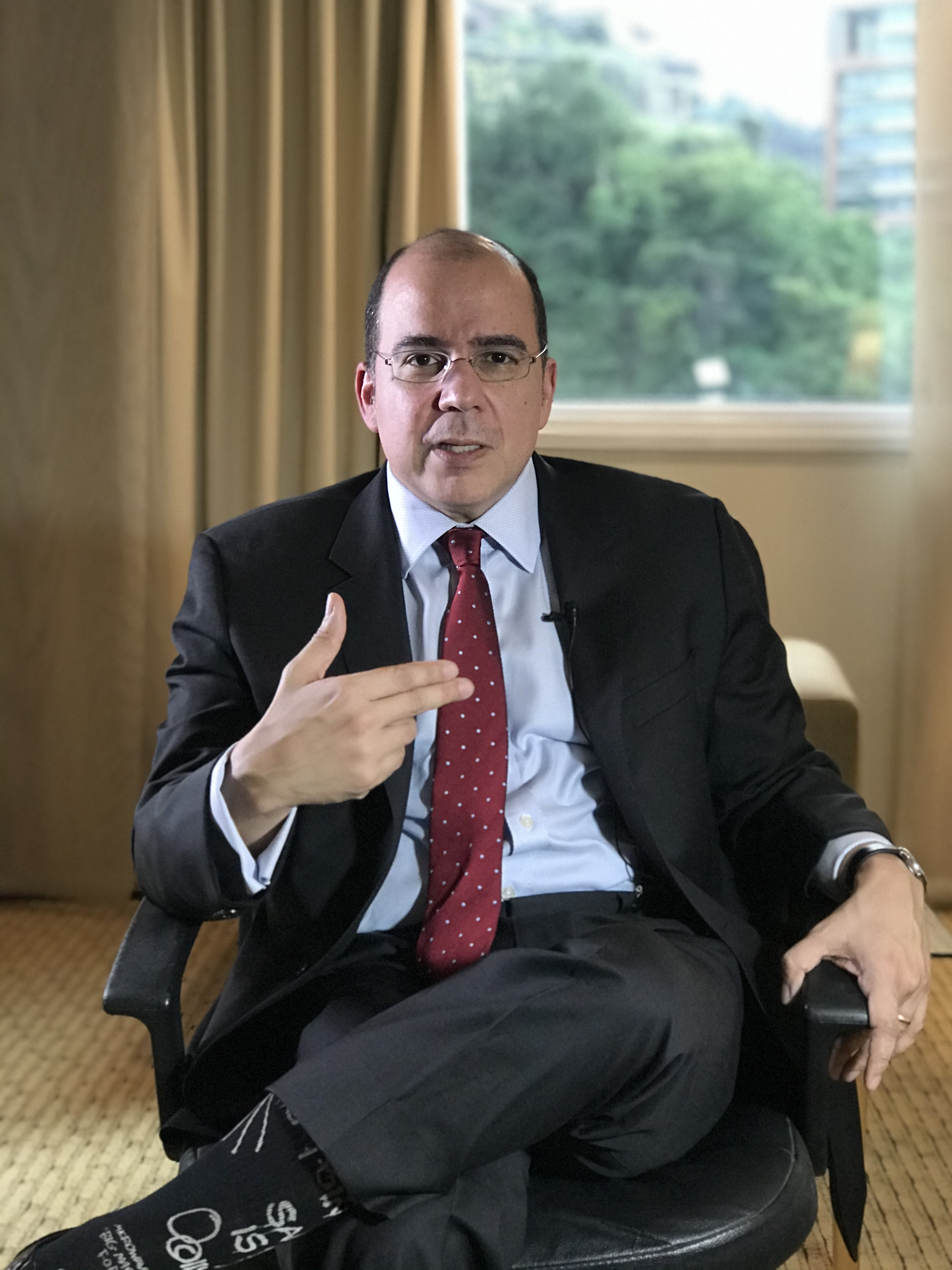
- Rodríguez during an interview, December 2019
- Born: Venezuela

Academic background
- Education: Harvard University, Andrés Bello Catholic University
- Website: https://franciscorodriguez.net

Francisco R. Rodríguez is an economist from Venezuela. He is the Rice Family Professor of the Practice of International and Public Affairs at the University of Denver's Josef Korbel School of International Studies and a senior research fellow at the Center for Economic and Policy Research.

From 2000 to 2004, he served as the head of the economic and financial advisory of the Venezuelan National Assembly (Spanish: Oficina de Asesoría Económica y Financiera de Asamblea Nacional). Rodríguez led the research team of the United Nations' Human Development Report Office from 2008 to 2011. He was chief economist at Torino Economics, the economic analysis branch of New York-based Torino Capital, between 2016 and 2019, and served as policy advisor for presidential candidate Henri Falcón in 2018.

== Career ==
Rodríguez served as an Assistant Professor in the Department of Economics at the University of Maryland at College Park from 1998 to 2000.

From 2000 to 2004, Rodríguez served as the head of the economic and financial advisory of the National Assembly of Venezuela.

He was an Assistant Professor of Economics and Latin American Studies at Wesleyan University (2005–2009) and a Professor of Public Policy at the Instituto de Estudios Superiores de Administración (2004–2005).

He was Head of Research at the United Nations Human Development Report from 2008 to 2011.

Rodríguez joined Bank of America Merrill Lynch in August 2011 as Chief Andean Economist, covering the economies of Colombia, Ecuador, Peru and Venezuela. In 2012 he predicted that Chávez would be re-elected during the presidential elections that year. He joined Torino Economics, the economic analysis branch of New York-based Torino Capital in July 2016 as chief economist. He left Torino Economics on 3 September 2019.

In May 2016, Rodríguez was part of a group of economists under an initiative promoted by the Union of South American Nations (UNASUR) to present an economic stabilization program to the government of Nicolás Maduro, who until then had refused to implement necessary monetary and fiscal reforms to contain prices, stabilize the exchange rate and foster production recovery. The plan was shelved by the Maduro administration.

Henri Falcón and Rodríguez stated that the 2018 Venezuelan presidential election was not valid.

He was a Visiting Fellow at the Kellogg Institute for International Studies at the University of Notre Dame in 2020-21 and in the spring of 2005. Rodríguez served as an International Affairs Fellow in International Economics at the US Council on Foreign Relations and as a Visiting Scholar in the Fiscal Affairs Department of the International Monetary Fund during 2021-2022.

He is the Greenleaf Visiting Professor of Latin American studies at Tulane University.

== Research career ==
Rodríguez researches contemporary Venezuelan issues. His studies have appeared in the American Economic Journal, Journal of Economic Growth, Journal of Macroeconomics, Journal of Politics, and World Development, among other peer-reviewed journals.

His published work includes "Trade Policy and Economic Growth: A Skeptic's Guide to the Cross-National Evidence", co-authored with the renowned economist and researcher Dani Rodrik. In this study, the authors examine whether countries with lower trade barriers induced by policies grow faster, finding little evidence that open trade policies—in the sense of lower tariff and non-tariff barriers—are significantly associated with economic growth.

In 1999, he co-authored the article "Why Do Resource-Abundant Economies Grow More Slowly?", with economist Jeffrey Sachs, in which they propose an alternative explanation for why resource-rich economies tend to have lower growth rates. They argue that this may occur because these countries are likely living beyond their means.

Another work by Rodríguez is "The HDI 2010: New Controversies, Old Critiques", co-authored with Jeni Klugman and Hyung-Jin Choi. This article examines the concept and key insights gained from the HDI, provides a review of current and past criticisms of the HDI, and discusses recent changes introduced to the HDI formula and indicators.

Rodríguez co-authored the research article "Do Shifts in Late-Counted Votes Signal Fraud? Evidence from Bolivia" with Dorothy Kronick and Nicolás Idrobo. The article examines whether variations in late-counted votes can lead to unfounded claims of electoral fraud. The authors state that these claims exploit the "early counting illusion": the misleading notion that, in the absence of fraud, an initial lead will persist. They characterize this early counting illusion and assess the associated fraud accusations in four contested elections. They state that the key insights are general: the temporal trends of legitimate vote-counting processes are much more varied, and errors in influential analyses much more frequent, than electoral skeptics claim.

== Selected bibliography ==
- Ricardo Hausmann and Francisco R. Rodríguez, ed. (2014). Venezuela Before Chávez: Anatomy of an Economic Collapse. ISBN 978-0-271-05631-9.
- Rodriguez, Francisco R. (2025). The Collapse of Venezuela: scorched earth politics and economic decline, 2012-2020 (1st ed.). Notre Dame: University of Notre Dame Press. ISBN 9780268209018.
- Rodríguez, Francisco (December 2024). "How clientelism works: Evidence from the Barinas special election". World Development. 184 106734. doi:10.1016/j.worlddev.2024.106734.
- Rodríguez, F. (2 July 2024). "How Economic Sanctions Affect Human Development: Evidence and Policy Implications". Journal of Human Development and Capabilities. 25 (3): 499–504. doi:10.1080/19452829.2024.2371544.
- Rodríguez, Francisco (8 May 2024). "The human consequences of economic sanctions". Journal of Economic Studies. 51 (4): 942–963. doi:10.1108/JES-06-2023-0299.
- Rodríguez, Francisco (2022). "Sanctions and Oil Production: Evidence from Venezuela's Orinoco Basin". Latin American Economic Review. 31 (6). doi:10.47872/laer.v31.33 (inactive 6 July 2025).
- Idrobo, Nicolás; Kronick, Dorothy; Rodríguez, Francisco (1 October 2022). "Do Shifts in Late-Counted Votes Signal Fraud? Evidence from Bolivia". The Journal of Politics. 84 (4): 2202–2215. doi:10.1086/719639.
- Rodríguez, Francisco; Zambrano, Eduardo (May 2022). "Monotone comparative statics in the Calvert–Wittman model". Economic Theory Bulletin. 10 (1): 105–116. arXiv:2107.07910. doi:10.1007/s40505-022-00220-8.
- Rodríguez, Francisco; Guerrero, Guillermo (15 January 2021). "Toward sustainable human development in Venezuela : diagnosis, challenges and economic strategy". Revista Tempo do Mundo. 23: 285–343. doi:10.38116/rtm23art11.
- Rodríguez, Francisco; Shelton, Cameron A. (December 2013). "Cleaning up the kitchen sink: Specification tests and average derivative estimators for growth econometrics". Journal of Macroeconomics. 38: 260–273. doi:10.1016/j.jmacro.2013.07.009.
- Rodriguez, Francisco; Jayadev, Arjun (27 January 2013). "The Declining Labor Share of Income". Journal of Globalization and Development. 3 (2): 1–18. doi:10.1515/jgd-2012-0028.
- Rodríguez, Francisco R.; Shelton, Cameron A. (27 January 2013). "Caught in a Poverty Trap? Testing for Single vs. Multiple Equilibrium Models of Growth". Journal of Globalization and Development. 3 (2): 1–25. doi:10.1515/jgd-2012-0033.
- Klugman, Jeni; Rodríguez, Francisco; Choi, Hyung-Jin (June 2011). "The HDI 2010: new controversies, old critiques". The Journal of Economic Inequality. 9 (2): 249–288. doi:10.1007/s10888-011-9178-z.
- Hsieh, Chang-Tai; Miguel, Edward; Ortega, Daniel; Rodriguez, Francisco (1 April 2011). "The Price of Political Opposition: Evidence from Venezuela's Maisanta". American Economic Journal: Applied Economics. 3 (2): 196–214. doi:10.1257/app.3.2.196.
- Cummins, Matthew; Rodríguez, Francisco (May 2010). "Is There a Numbers versus Rights Trade-off in Immigration Policy? What the Data Say". Journal of Human Development and Capabilities. 11 (2): 281–303. doi:10.1080/19452821003696855.
- RodríGuez, Francisco; Gomolin, Adam J. (January 2009). "Anarchy, State, and Dystopia: Venezuelan Economic Institutions before the Advent of Oil". Bulletin of Latin American Research. 28 (1): 102–121. doi:10.1111/j.1470-9856.2008.00292.x.
- Ortega, Daniel; Rodríguez, Francisco (October 2008). "Freed from Illiteracy? A Closer Look at Venezuela's Misión Robinson Literacy Campaign". Economic Development and Cultural Change. 57 (1): 1–30. doi:10.1086/590461.
- Rodríguez, Francisco (January 2006). "The Anarchy of Numbers: Understanding the Evidence on Venezuelan Economic Growth". Canadian Journal of Development Studies / Revue canadienne d'études du développement. 27 (4): 503–529. doi:10.1080/02255189.2006.9669171.
- Pineda, José; Rodríguez, Francisco (May 2006). "The Political Economy of Investment in Human Capital". Economics of Governance. 7 (2): 167–193. doi:10.1007/s10101-005-0002-8.
- Rodríguez, Francisco (November 2004). "Inequality, redistribution and rent-seeking". Economics & Politics. 16 (3): 287–320. doi:10.1111/j.1468-0343.2004.00141.x.
- Rodríguez, Francisco; Rodrik, Dani (January 2000). "Trade Policy and Economic Growth: A Skeptic's Guide to the Cross-National Evidence". NBER Macroeconomics Annual. 15: 261–325. doi:10.1086/654419.
- Rodriguez, Francisco; Sachs, Jeffrey D. (1999). "Why do Resource-Abundant Economies Grow More Slowly?". Journal of Economic Growth. 4 (3): 277–303. doi:10.1023/A:1009876618968.
- Hausmann, Ricardo; Rodríguez, Francisco (13 June 2015). "1 Why Did Venezuelan Growth Collapse?". Venezuela Before Chávez: 15–50. doi:10.1515/9780271064628-003. ISBN 978-0-271-06462-8.
- Pineda, José; Rodríguez, Francisco (13 June 2015). "3 Public Investment and Productivity Growth in the Venezuelan Manufacturing Industry". Venezuela Before Chávez: 91–114. doi:10.1515/9780271064628-005. ISBN 978-0-271-06462-8.
- Rodríguez, Francisco; Pineda, José Gregorio (28 July 2011). "Curse or Blessing? Natural Resources and Human Development". In Ocampo, José Antonio; Ros, Jaime (eds.). The Oxford handbook of Latin American economics. Oxford; New York: Oxford University Press. ISBN 9780199571048.
- Rodríguez, Francisco (2012). "When Is Public Expenditure Pro-Poor?". In Lin, Justin Yifu; Pleskovic, Boris (eds.). Annual World Bank Conference on Development Economics--Global 2009: People, Politics, and Globalization. Washington, DC: World Bank. pp. 419–443. ISBN 978-0-8213-7722-2.
- Rodriguez, Francisco (2009). "Understanding Fiscal Expansions". In Roy, Rathin; Heuty, Antoine (eds.). Fiscal space: policy options for financing human development. London Sterling, Va: Earthscan. ISBN 9781849771344.
- Ricardo, Hausmann; Rodríguez, Francisco; Wagner, Rodrigo (2008). "Growth Collapses". In Reinhart, Carmen M.; Vegh, Carlos A.; Velasco, Andres (eds.). Money, Crises, and Transition: Essays in Honor of Guillermo A. Calvo. Cambridge, MA: MIT Press Scholarship Online. pp. 377–428. doi:10.7551/mitpress/9780262182669.003.0016. ISBN 978-0-262-18266-9.
- Rodríguez, Francisco (1 March 2008). "Venezuela's Revolution in Decline". World Policy Journal. 25 (1): 45–58. doi:10.1162/wopj.2008.25.1.45.
- Rodríguez, Francisco (2 March 2008). "An Empty Revolution The Unfulfilled Promises of Hugo Chávez". Foreign Affairs. Vol. 87, no. 2. Council on Foreign Relations.
- RodrÍguez, Francisco (March 2004). "Factor Shares and Resource Booms: Accounting for the Evolution of Venezuelan Inequality". In Cornia, Giovanni Andrea (ed.). Inequality Growth and Poverty in an Era of Liberalization and Globalization. Oxford, uk: Oxford University Press. pp. 327–354. doi:10.1093/0199271410.003.0013. ISBN 9780199271412.
