= Barry B. Hughes =

- Education: Stanford University (B.S.); University of Minnesota (M.A.), (Ph.D.)
- Known for: Forecasting
- Scientific career
- Fields: International relations Political science
- Workplaces: Josef Korbel School of International Studies (University of Denver)

Barry B. Hughes is the John Evans Professor at the University of Denver, Josef Korbel School of International Studies. He is a senior scientist, mentor and founder of the Pardee Center for International Futures, a center for long-term, systemic thinking on political, economic, social and environmental issues. Hughes has spent the majority of his career developing the International Futures global integrated assessment model. This model has been used by a wide range of international organizations and governments, including the European Commission, the National Intelligence Council, the United States Institute of Peace and the United Nations Environment Programme.

Hughes received his bachelor's degree from Stanford University and master's and Ph.D. from the University of Minnesota.

== See also ==
- Club of Rome

== Bibliography ==
- Improving Global Health (2011)
- Advancing Global Education (2010)
- Reducing Global Poverty (2009)
- Exploring and Shaping International Futures (2006)
- International Futures (1993, rev. 1996, 1999)
- Continuity and Change in World Politics (1991, rev. 1994, 1997, 2000)
- Disarmament and Development (1990)
- World Futures (1985)
- World Modeling (1980)
- The Domestic Context of American Foreign Policy (1978)
