= Human Trafficking Center =

The Human Trafficking Center is housed within the Josef Korbel School of International Studies at the University of Denver. Established in 2002, the HTC is a research and advocacy organization composed of graduate students and faculty at the Korbel School.

The HTC collaborates with local and national partners on research and advocacy endeavors, including consulting on human trafficking legislation and advising on best practices within anti-trafficking efforts. The HTC blog is a compilation of current human trafficking news, research and best practices.
