= Gail Harris (naval officer) =

- Born: June 23, 1949 (age 77); East Orange, New Jersey, U.S.
- Military career
- Allegiance: United States of America
- Branch: United States Navy
- Service years: 1973–2001
- Rank: Captain
- Other work: Intelligence expert, Lockheed Martin

Gail Harris (born June 23, 1949) is a former United States Navy officer, and was the highest-ranking female African American in the U.S. Navy upon her retirement in December 2001. She served as the first female intelligence officer in a Navy aviation squadron in 1973. In 1979, Captain Harris became the first female and African American instructor at the Armed Forces Air Intelligence Training Center at Lowry Air Force Base, Colorado. In 1989, she became the first female and African American to lead the Intelligence Department for Fleet Air Reconnaissance Squadron in Rota, Spain, the largest Navy aviation squadron.

== Early life and education ==
Harris was born on June 23, 1949, in East Orange, New Jersey, to James and Lena Harris, and was raised in Newark, New Jersey's inner city along with her brother and sister. After high school Captain Harris received her Bachelor of Arts degree in political science from Drew University, in Madison, New Jersey, in 1971. In 1983, she earned a master's degree in international studies at the University of Denver's Graduate School of International Studies (now the Josef Korbel School of International Studies), where Condoleezza Rice was a classmate of hers.

== Career ==
Harris entered the U.S. Navy on May 16, 1973 and was commissioned through Officer Candidate School, in Newport, Rhode Island.

In October 1973 to October 1976, Harris was chosen to be the test case for women in Naval Operational Aviation Squadron, and there, she served as the air intelligence officer for Patrol Squadron 47 at Moffett Field, California, her first assignment.

At the end of 1976, she was requested by name to report to Kamiseya, Japan, to the Fleet Ocean Surveillance Information Facility and became the first female and African American female to be designated an Intelligence Watch Specialist in the U.S. Navy, as an Intelligence Watch Officer.

In April 1979, Captain Gail Harris became the U.S. Navy's first female and African American instructor at the Armed Forces Air Intelligence Training Center at Lowry Air Force Base, Colorado. There she built up the U.S. Navy's first course on ocean surveillance information systems and taught the Anti-Submarine Warfare and Soviet Surface Operations courses.

In 1984, Captain Harris was one of the first two women assigned to the Office of Naval Intelligence's War Gaming Team Detachment at the Naval War College, and was chosen to be commander of the Soviet Union's Theater military forces, twice during the Global War Games.

In 1988, Gail was requested by name to coordinate the Defense Department's Intelligence support for the 1988 Olympics in Seoul, South Korea.

In 1989, she was selected to head the Intelligence Department for Fleet Air Reconnaissance Squadron Two, in Rota, Spain, becoming the first female and African American to do so in the U.S. Navy's largest Aviation Squadron. The mission was for the squadron to support U.S. military and aircraft carrier operations with intelligence reports during the Gulf War.

During her service, between 1992 and 1996, in the Middle East, as the intelligence planner for Commander U.S. Forces Central Command, she also headed the U.S. Navy's Iraqi Crisis Action Cell and Intelligence Watch Center during crisis operations in the Persian Gulf. At this time, she was also specifically chosen by the director of Naval Intelligence and commander of U.S. Naval Forces Central Command to fill in as acting naval attache, Egypt, for a five-month period, becoming the first female attache to a Middle Eastern country.

For her last assignment, Harris was selected to develop intelligence policy for computer network defense and computer network attack for the Department of Defense.

== Personal life ==
Since retiring from the military in 2001, Harris worked for Lockheed Martin as an intelligence subject matter expert. She has also been a contributing author to books such as Wake Up and Live Your Life With Passion, and Lies and Limericks: Inspirations from Ireland. She is currently finishing her book/memoir War On Any Given Day, and she also has a weekly R&B radio show.

== Awards and decorations ==
- Navy Commendation Medal (3)
- Defense Meritorious Service Medal (2)
- Defense Superior Service Medal (2)
- Meritorious Service Medal
- Sea Service Deployment Ribbon (2)
- Joint Meritorious Unit Award
- Navy Unit Commendation
- National Defense Service Medal (2)
- Pistol Marksman Ribbon
- Southwest Asia Service Medal with bronze star
- Navy Battle "E" Ribbon (2)
- Saudi Liberation Medal
- Kuwaiti Liberation Medal
