= Tom Farer =

American academic and author (1935–2025)

13th President of the University of New Mexico
- In office 1985–1986
- Preceded by: John Perovich

Dean of the Josef Korbel School of International Studies
- In office 1996–2010
- Succeeded by: Christopher R. Hill

Personal details
- Born: July 28, 1935
- Died: March 3, 2025 (aged 89)
- Education: Harvard Law School; Princeton University
- Profession: Academic, lawyer
- Website: www.tomfarer.com

Tom Joel Farer (July 28, 1935 – March 3, 2025) was an American academic and author who was president of the University of New Mexico. After ending his tenure at New Mexico in 1986, Farer served as dean of the Josef Korbel School of International Studies at the University of Denver from 1996 to 2010. He was later a university professor of international relations at the Josef Korbel School.

== Academic career ==
=== Education ===
Farer earned his bachelor's degree from Princeton University, graduating magna cum laude and Phi Beta Kappa. He then received his Juris Doctor from Harvard Law School Magna cum laude and was Note Editor of the Law Review]. In his third year he was named clerk for Judge Learned Hand. Following law school and Judge Hand's death, he worked at the Department of Defense as special assistant to the General Counsel, former Harvard professor John McNaughton, and for Secretary of Defense Robert McNamara. Thereafter he served for a year as special assistant to the commanding general of the Somali National Police Force and taught criminal law and procedure at the Police Academy and unarmed self-defense to the riot police. Returning to the United States, he worked for a year for the Wall Street law firm of David, Polk and then joined the faculty of Columbia Law School. He also taught law at Rutgers, Tulane, MIT, Harvard, and American University and international relations at Princeton, Johns Hopkins, Cambridge, IBEI in Barcelona and the University of Denver where he is University Professor and Dean Emeritus. He served as President of the Inter-American Commission on Human Rights of the OAS, President of the University of New Mexico, Senior Fellow of the Carnegie Endowment and the Council on Foreign Relations, a fellow of the Smithsonian's Woodrow Wilson Institute, and a consultant to Amnesty International and Human Rights Watch. He was Honorary Professor at Peking University. His last book was "Confronting Global Terrorism and American Neo-Conservatism: The Framework of a Liberal Grand Strategy" (Oxford 2008). In January 2020 Cambridge University Press published his latest work "Migration and Integration: The Case for Liberalism with Borders." He was a member of The Cosmos Club of Washington, D.C. and the Council on Foreign Relations. He had an honorary doctorate from Panteion University in Athens, Greece.

=== Faculty positions ===
As an academic, Farer was considered an expert on international relations as well as international politics and law. He previously held faculty positions at Cambridge University, American University, Tulane Law School, Harvard Law School, Princeton University, Johns Hopkins University, Rutgers University and Columbia Law School.

Due to controversy surrounding his rapport with the University of New Mexico's Board of Regents, Farer served only one year as president before stepping down. He subsequently became a professor at the University of New Mexico School of Law.

== Death ==
Farer died on March 3, 2025, at the age of 89.

== Bibliography ==
- Financing African Development (1965)
- Warclouds on the Horn of Africa (1976)
- Toward a Humanitarian Foreign Policy: A Primer for Policy (1980)
- The Grand Strategy of the United States in Latin America (1988)
- U.S. Ends and Means in Central America (1988, co-author)
- Israel's Unlawful Occupation (1991)
- Beyond Sovereignty: Collectively Defending Democracy in the Western Hemisphere (1996)
- Transnational Crime in the Americas (1999)
- Confronting Global Terrorism and American Neo-Conservatism: The Framework of Liberal Grand Strategy (2008)
