= Shahram Akbarzadeh =

Australian academic

Shahram Akbarzadeh is a professor of Middle East & Central Asian Politics based at Deakin University in Melbourne, Victoria. Australia. Prior to his commencing his appointment at Deakin University in 2014, he was professor of Middle Eastern politics at the University of Melbourne. Akbarzadeh completed his M.A. in Russian and East European Studies at Birmingham University in 1992 and acquired a PhD at La Trobe University in 1998. He served as the Central and West Asia Councillor for the Asian Studies Association of Australia from 1999 to 2004. His numerous publications include works on Middle East politics, Central Asian politics and the politics of radicalisation among the Muslim community of Australia.

In 2012 he won a prestigious Discovery fellowship with the Australian Research Council.

== Publications ==
- Iran in the World: President Rouhani's Foreign Policy. Palgrave Macmillan US, 2016, Akbarzadeh, Shahram and Conduit, Dara (eds.,).
- Muslim Active Citizenship in the West NY: Routledge, 2014, Peucker, Mario and Akbarzadeh, Shahram
- American Democracy Promotion in the Changing Middle East: From Bush to Obama, Durham Modern Middle East & Islamic World Series. Oxon and NY: Routledge, 2013, Akbarzadeh, Shahram et al. (eds.,).
- The Arab Revolutions in Context. Melbourne: MUP, 2012, Isakhan, Benjamin; Mansouri, Fethi and Akbarzadeh, Shahram.
- Routledge Handbook of Political Islam. London: Routledge, 2012, Akbarzadeh, Shahram
- America's Challenges in the Greater Middle East. NY: Palgrave Macmillan, 2011, Akbarzadeh, Shahram (ed.,)
- Islam and Human Rights in Practice: Perspectives Across the Ummah. London: Routledge, 2010, Akbarzadeh, Shahram and MacQueen, Benjamin (eds.,)
- US Foreign Policy in the Middle East. London: Routledge, 2008, Baxter, Kylie and Akbarzadeh, Shahram
- Islam and Political Violence: Muslim Diaspora and Radicalism in the West. London and NY: IB Tauris, 2007, Akbarzadeh, Shahram and Mansouri, Fethi (eds.,)
- Political Islam and Human Security. Cambridge: Cambridge Scholars Press, 2006, Akbarzadeh, Shahram and Mansouri, Fethi (eds.,)
- Islam and Globalization, 4 volumes. Routledge Series on Critical Concepts in Islamic Studies. London: Routledge, 2006, Akbarzadeh, Shahram (ed.,)
- Islam and the West. Sydney: UNSW Press, 2005, Akbarzadeh, Shahram and Yasmeen, Samina (eds.,)
- Uzbekistan and the United States: Authoritarianism, Islamism and Washington's Security Agenda. London: Zed books, 2005, Akbarzadeh, Shahram
- Islam and Political Legitimacy. London: Routledge Curzon Press, May 2003, Akbarzadeh, Shahram and Saeed, Abdullah (eds.,)
- Historical Dictionary of Tajikistan. Scarecrow Press, Lanham, Md. and London, February 2002, Akbarzadeh, Shahram and Abdullaev, Kamoludin. Now revised and under print for 2nd edition for 2010

== History ==
Biography

Shahram Akbarzadeh is Research Professor of Middle East & Central Asian Politics and holds the prestigious ARC Future Fellowship.

He has an active research interest in the politics of Central Asia, Islam, Muslims in Australia and the Middle East. He has been involved in organising a number of key conferences, including a Chatham House rule workshop on Australia's relations with Iran, Iraq and Afghanistan (2007), sponsored by the International Centre of Excellence for Asia Pacific Studies, and a conference on the Arab Revolution with Freedom House, sponsored by the Department of Foreign Affairs and Trade (DFAT).

In 2000 Professor Akbarzadeh was the Middle East Studies conference co-convener and served as the Central and West Asia Councillor for the Asian Studies Association of Australia (1999-2004). He has promoted Asian studies through contacts with industry and the academia by research and publication. He guest edited a special issue of Asian Studies Review on the Middle East (Vol.25, No.2, 2001) and a special issue of the Journal of Arabic, Islamic and Middle Eastern Studies on Globalization (Vol. 5, No.2, 2000).

He has published more than 40 refereed papers. Among his latest publications are a sole-authored book on Uzbekistan and the United States, a co-authored book on US Foreign Policy in the Middle East, and a co-authored book on Muslim Active Citizenship in the West.

Professor Akbarzadeh is the founding Editor of the Islamic Studies Series, published by Melbourne University Press, and a regular public commentator. He has produced key reports for the Australian Research Council (ARC) on Australian based scholarship on Islam, and also for the Department of Immigration and Citizenship (DIAC) on Muslim Voices and Mapping Employment and Education; and has produced a report on Islam in the Australian media. He acted as Convenor of the Islam Node for the ARC Asia Pacific Futures Research Network.

He is a member of the Editorial Board of four leading refereed journals: Global Change, Peace & Security, the Journal of Muslim Minority Affairs, the Journal of Asian Security and International Affairs; and an International Advisory Board member of the World Journal of Islamic History and Civilization.
