= Josef Korbel School of International Studies =

International affairs school of the University of Denver

Coordinates: 39.6783°N 104.9620°W

The Josef Korbel School of Global and Public Affairs
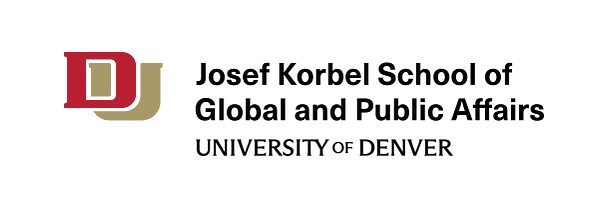
- Motto: Pro Scientia et Religione
- Type: Private
- Established: 1964 as the Graduate School of International Studies
- Dean: Frederick "Fritz" Mayer
- Undergraduates: 260
- Postgraduates: 450
- Location: 2201 South Gaylord Street, Denver, Colorado
- Campus: Urban — University of Denver
- Nicknames: Josef Korbel School, JKSIS
- Website: du.edu/korbel

The Josef Korbel School of Global and Public Affairs at the University of Denver is a professional school of international affairs offering undergraduate, graduate, and doctoral degrees. It is named in honor of the founding dean, Josef Korbel, father of former U.S. Secretary of State Madeleine Albright.

The Josef Korbel School is located on the University of Denver’s main campus in Denver's University Hill neighborhood. The school currently educates more than 700 students with nearly 70 full- and part-time faculty members. It is also home to 10 academic research centers and institutes. Frederick “Fritz” Mayer has been dean of the school since 2019.

In 2018, the school's master's programs were ranked 14th in the world by Foreign Policy magazine. The Josef Korbel School is a full member of the Association of Professional Schools of International Affairs (APSIA).

== History ==
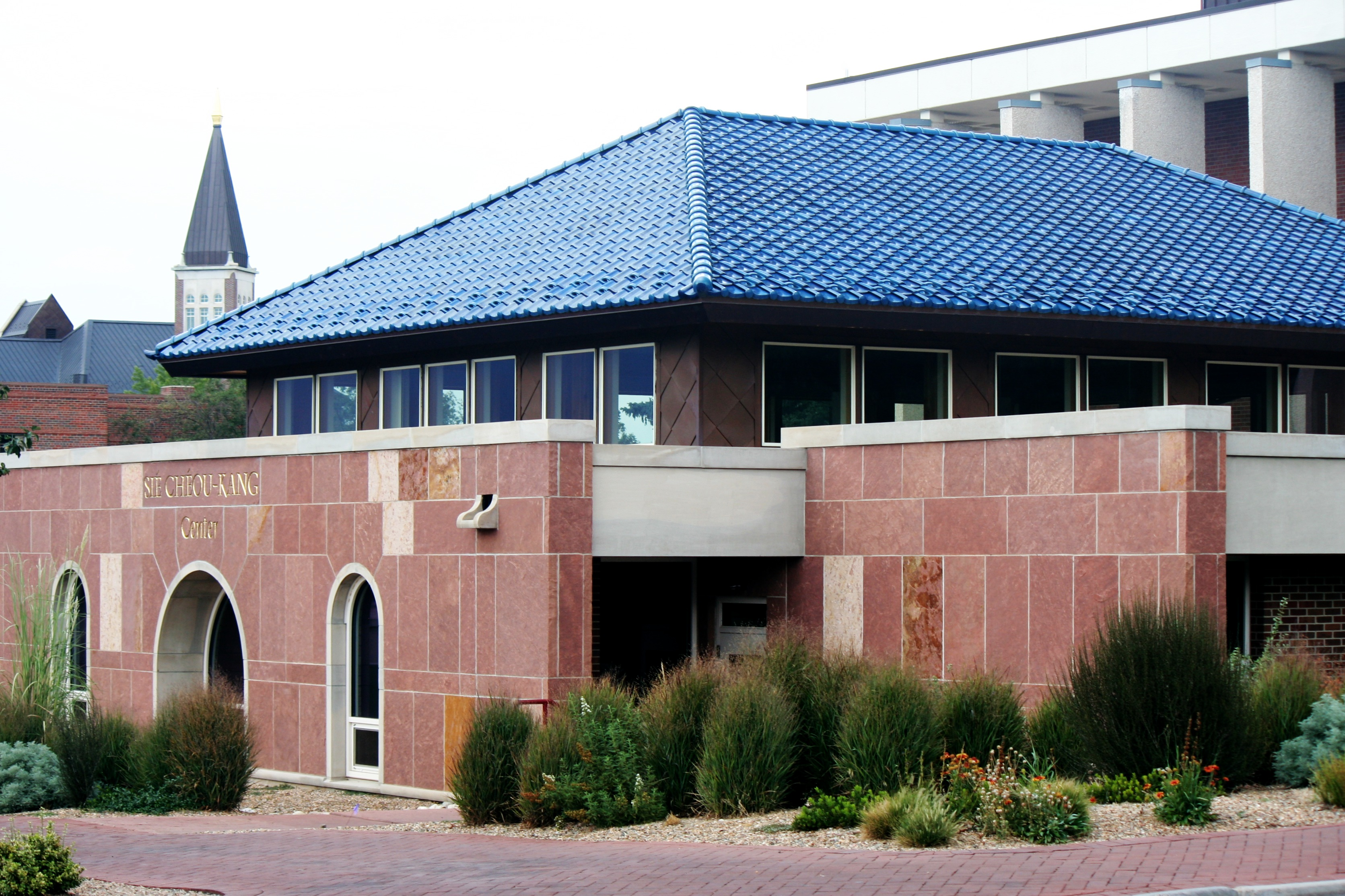
The Sié Chéou-Kang Center for International Security and Diplomacy, part of the Josef Korbel School

The Department of International Relations at the University of Denver was first directed by Dr. Ben Mark Cherrington, an educator and policy maker who was associated with some of his era's preeminent political thinkers, including Gandhi, Louis Brandeis and Ramsay MacDonald.

According to the University of Denver, "In 1938, Cherrington was handpicked by the United States Department of State to lead its new Division of Cultural Relations and tasked with carrying out 'the exchange of professors, teachers, and students...cooperation in the field of music, art, literature...international radio broadcasts...generally, the dissemination abroad of the representative intellectual and cultural work of the U.S.'" Cherrington later became chancellor of the University of Denver from 1943 to 1946, and he was also a contributing author to the United Nations Charter.

The Graduate School of International Studies (GSIS) was established under the efforts of Josef Korbel, who became its first dean, in 1964. Decades earlier, he had been forced to flee during the Communist coup in Czechoslovakia in 1948. Korbel was granted political asylum in the United States and was hired in 1949 to teach international politics at the University of Denver. To house the school, the 30,300-square-foot (2,810 m^{2}) Ben M. Cherrington Hall was built in 1965.

Nearly 25 years after Korbel's death, the University of Denver established the Josef Korbel Humanitarian Award in 2000. In 2008, the Graduate School of International Studies was renamed the Josef Korbel School of International Studies, in his honor and in recognition of his family's support. In 2025, the school was renamed to the Josef Korbel School of Global and Public Affairs to reflect "the bold, evolving scope of Korbel’s mission and its growing impact on the world stage and, increasingly, at the local level."

Other deans who followed Korbel include Tom Farer, a lawyer, scholar and diplomat who served in the U.S. State Department, the U.S. Defense Department and as president of the University of New Mexico. Former U.S Ambassador Christopher R. Hill took over as dean in 2010. Hill has experience as a Peace Corps volunteer in Cameroon, and has served as ambassador to Macedonia, Poland, South Korea and Iraq. He was a member of the team that negotiated the Bosnia peace settlement and has worked on negotiations with North Korea.

== Degree programs ==
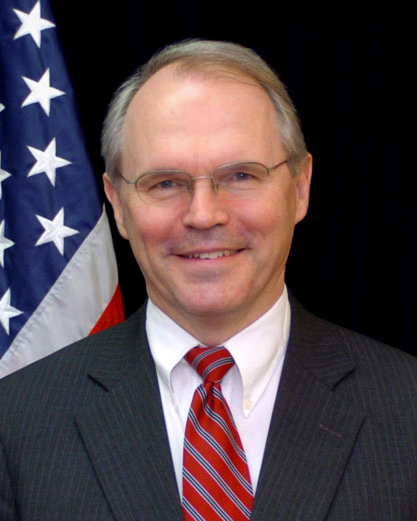
U.S. Ambassador Christopher Hill, former dean of JKSIS

=== Undergraduate programs ===
The Josef Korbel School offers a Bachelor of Arts in Public Policy and a Bachelor of Arts in International Studies with the following specializations:

- Global Political Economy & International Politics
- International Development & Health
- International Organizations, Security & Human Rights

=== Graduate programs ===
The Josef Korbel School focuses on training graduate students, both for master's and doctoral degrees, in a number of different areas. In addition to the major, students also specify certain concentrations, either a subject interest or a regional focus. All degrees require a 150-hour field internship.

The school's graduate programs include Masters of Arts in International Human Rights; International Development; Global Economic Affairs; Global Environmental Sustainability; International Security; and International Studies, and a Master of Public Policy.

Graduate students can also earn a graduate certificate of specialization in Global Business and Corporate Social Responsibility, Global Environmental Change and Adaptation, Homeland Security, Humanitarian Assistance, Public Diplomacy, Public Policy, Religion and International Affairs, and Strategic Intelligence on top of their master's degree work.

=== Dual degree programs ===
The Josef Korbel School also offers dual degrees in conjunction with the University of Denver's Sturm College of Law, Graduate School of Social Work, and the Department of Media, Film, and Journalism Studies. These degrees are MPP/JD, MA/MSW, and MA/MA in International & Intercultural Communication, respectively.

== Reputation and rankings ==
=== Rankings ===
The Josef Korbel School’s graduate programs were ranked 12th in the world in International Relations Masters programs and 20th in International Relations undergraduate programs by the 2024 Inside the Ivory Tower survey of scholars, which was published in Foreign Policy. In 2007, the magazine ranked the Korbel master's program as 9th in the U.S. for graduate level, international affairs programs. It is also one of 35 institutions worldwide that is a full member of the Association of Professional Schools of International Affairs, a grouping of international studies-orientated institutions.

=== Peace Corps Fellows ===
In 2011, 77 returned Peace Corps volunteers matriculated as graduate students at the University of Denver through the Paul D. Coverdell Fellowship program. Coverdell Fellows are individuals who receive funding and support to help offset the costs of graduate school following their return from service abroad in the Peace Corps. The 2011 and 2013 figures show that DU hosted the largest number of returned Peace Corps volunteers of any graduate school in the country. These volunteers are most often enrolled in one of the Korbel School's M.A. programs.

== Notable people ==
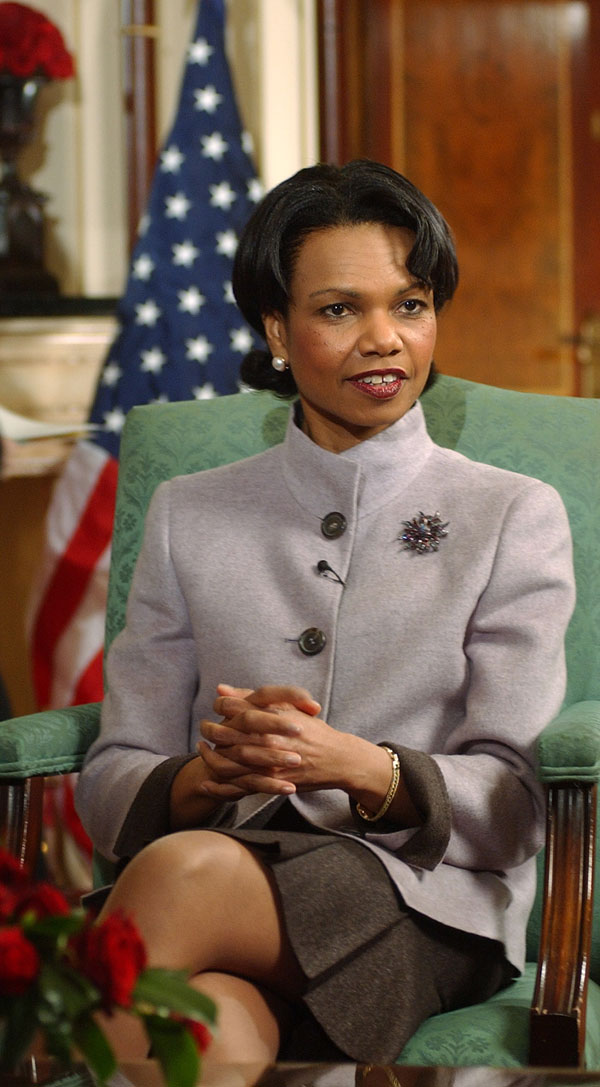
Sec. Condoleezza Rice, B.A. '74, PhD '81

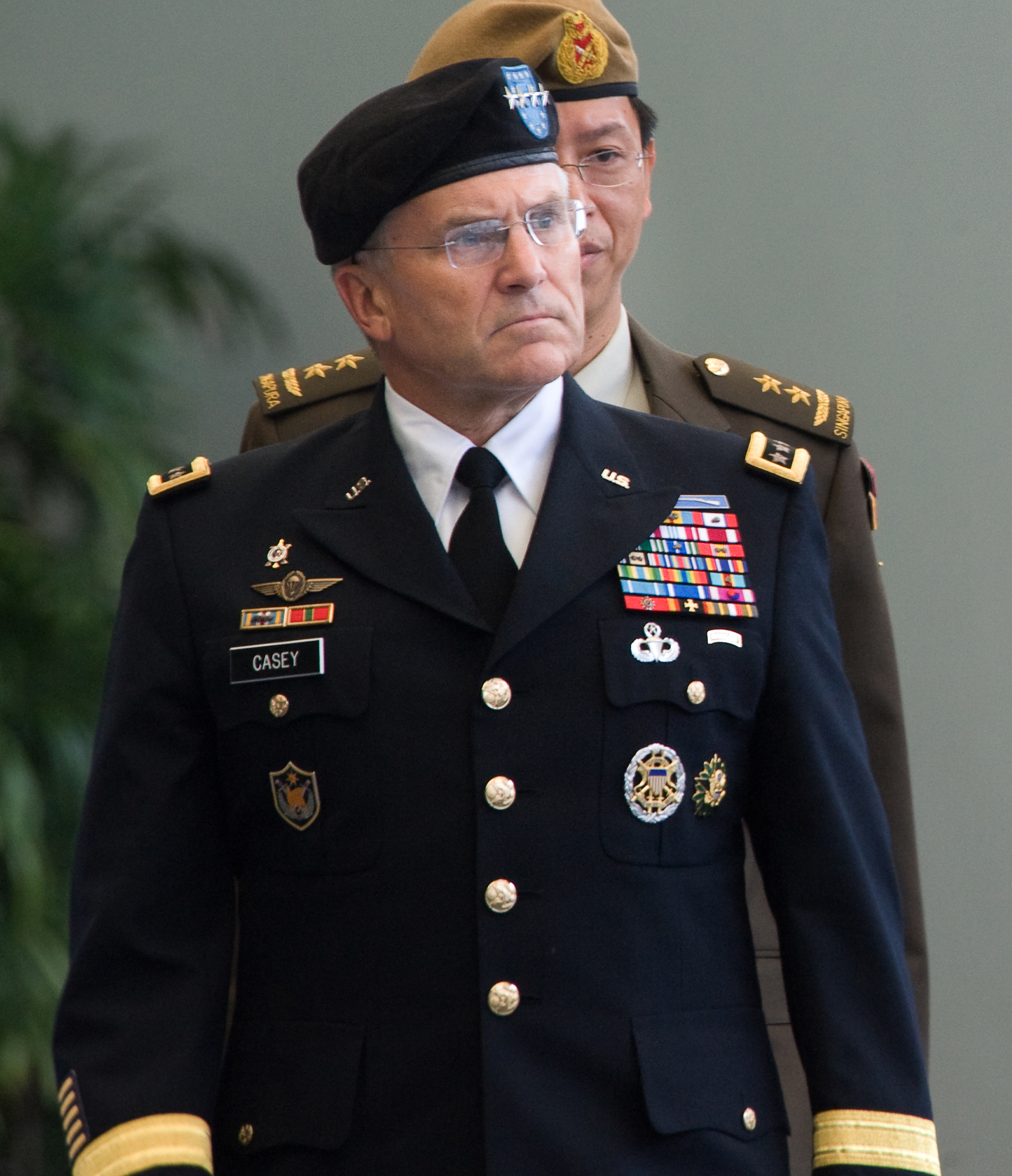
Gen. George Casey, M.A. '80

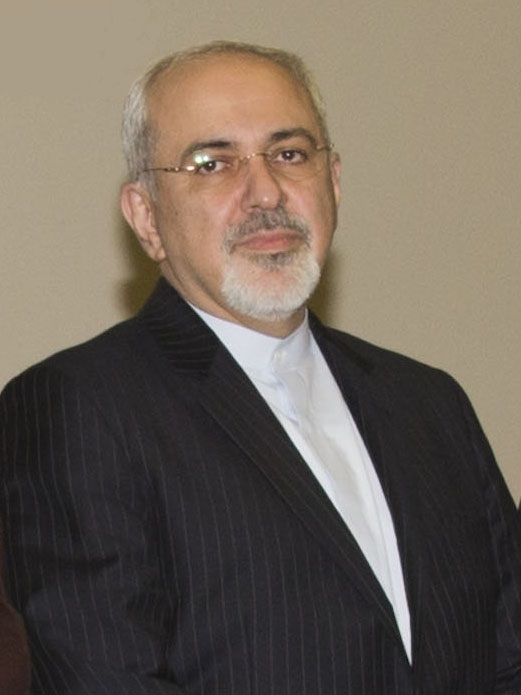
Mohammad Javad Zarif, MA '84, PhD '88

=== Korbel alumni ===
Many of the school's alumni have gone on to careers in international service:

- Condoleezza Rice - 66th U.S. Secretary of State; former National Security Advisor; former provost, Stanford University
- George W. Casey Jr. - Chief of Staff of the United States Army
- Cindy Courville - Former U.S. Ambassador to the African Union; former senior director for African Affairs, National Security Council
- Captain Gail Harris - Former U.S. naval officer, the highest-ranking African American female in the United States Navy upon her retirement in December 2001
- Jami Miscik - President of Kissinger Associates, Inc. in New York City; former Deputy Director for Intelligence at the CIA
- Massouma al-Mubarak - Minister of Communications of Kuwait; Kuwait's first female government minister
- Heraldo Muñoz - Current Minister of Foreign Affairs of Chile; Former Permanent Representative of Chile to the United Nations
- Paul Trivelli - Former U.S. Ambassador to Nicaragua
- Mohammad Javad Zarif - Minister of Foreign Affairs of Iran; former Permanent Representative of Iran to the United Nations
- Paula Broadwell - Bestselling author and mistress of David Petraeus.
- Michelle Kwan - U.S. Olympic Figure Skater and current State Department employee
- Guy Padgett - Former mayor of Casper, Wyoming; the state's first openly-gay elected official
- Susan Waltz - Professor, Gerald R. Ford School of Public Policy; board member at Amnesty International
- Anil Raj - former Amnesty International Board Member and UNDP aid worker killed in a terror attack in Kabul in November 2019

=== Notable faculty ===
Several noted professionals in the field of international relations serve as professors and lecturers as part of the school's faculty. Some past and present faculty members include:

- Erica Chenoweth - Expert on civil resistance movements
- Tom Farer - former dean at the Korbel School, president of the University of New Mexico, president of the Inter-American Commission on Human Rights of the Organization of American States
- Jendayi Frazer - Former U.S. Ambassador to South Africa and U.S. Assistant Secretary of State for African Affairs
- Christopher R. Hill - Former dean and former U.S. Ambassador to Iraq, Korea, Poland and Macedonia
- Barry B. Hughes - Specialist on forecasting and director of the Pardee Center for International Futures
- Haider A. Khan - Expert on social accounting matrix (SAM)-based economic modeling
- Josef Korbel - Founding dean, father of Madeleine Albright, and mentor of Condoleezza Rice
- Francisco R. Rodríguez - Venezuelan economist, former financial advisor to the National Assembly of Venezuela, and founder of "Oil for Venezuela"
- Suisheng Zhao - Expert on China-United States relations and founding editor and the editor-in-chief of the multidisciplinary Journal of Contemporary China.
- Carol Spahn - Former director of the Peace Corps from 2022 to 2025.

== Research centers, publications and partnerships ==
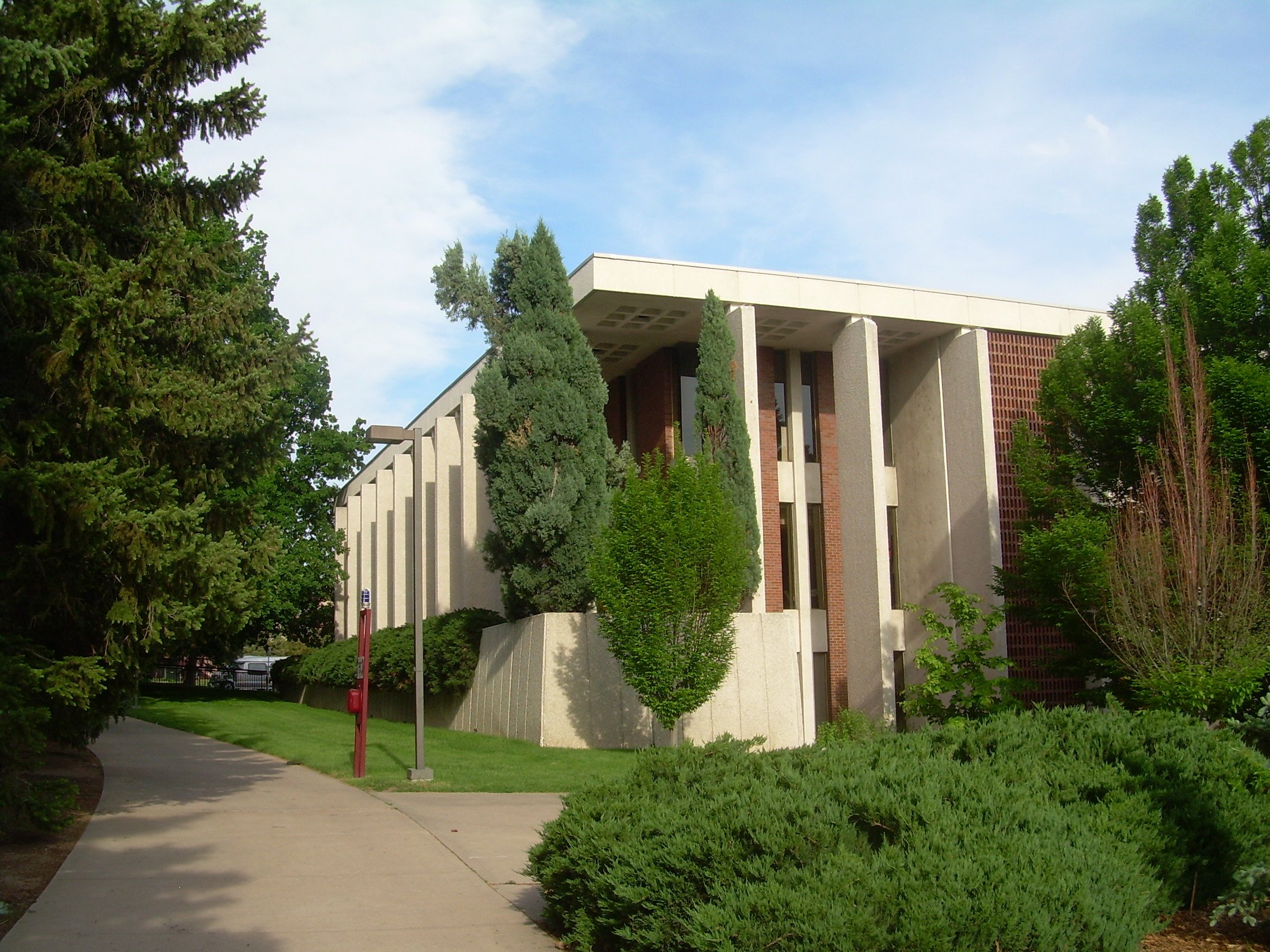
Ben Cherrington Hall, home to the Korbel School

The Josef Korbel School is home to 10 research centers, clinics and institutes, including the following:

- Center for China-U.S. Cooperation: according to the center's website, it is "the only institution in the Rocky Mountain region devoted to building mutual understanding, prudent policies and avenues of dispute resolution among the people of Greater China and the United States."
- Center on Human Rights Education: a center which promotes universal recognition of human rights through research, advocacy, monitoring, representation, and outreach.
- Center for Middle East Studies: The Center for Middle East Studies (CMES) is dedicated to promoting and strengthening the study and understanding of the societies, political systems, and international relations of the Middle East and broader Islamic world, both at DU and throughout the Mountain West."
- Center for the Study of Europe and the World: a joint program with the University of Colorado's, aimed at studying transatlantic and European Union issues.
- Collaborative Refugee and Immigrant Information Center: a referral and informational database project designed as a resource for immigrants and displaced persons settling in Colorado.
- Conflict Resolution Institute: a research program dedicated to studying peaceful de-escalation techniques. It sponsors the university's Conflict Resolution Master of Arts degree.
- Frederick S. Pardee Center for International Futures: a research, analysis and education center for International Futures, a computer modeling system that can help forecast long-term global changes and trends in demographics, economics and the environment. Endowed by Frederick S. Pardee in 2007. Current model results are being hosted by the Google Public Data Explorer.
- Human Trafficking Center: a clinic which provides professional research, writing, and educational outreach on human trafficking and all forms of modern day slavery. Its "aim is to provide research that improves inter-organizational cooperation and accountability, influences policy, and raises awareness in combating human trafficking and modern day slavery."
- International Career Advancement Program: a professional development leadership program for mid-career individuals in the international affairs field.
- Sié Chéou-Kang Center for International Security and Diplomacy: a major teaching and research center for leadership training in international security and diplomacy. This center supports the school's study-abroad arrangement with Graduate Institute of International and Development Studies in Geneva, Switzerland and directs the Sié Fellows program, which offers full-tuition scholarships to top applicants.

=== Featured journals ===
The Josef Korbel Journal of Advanced International Studies, Human Rights and Human Welfare, and the Journal of Contemporary China are published by the Josef Korbel School. The school also became the five-year host of the journal Global Governance: A Review of Multilateralism and International Organizations, the official journal of the Academic Council of the United Nations System (ACUNS), in July 2009.

=== Other opportunities and partnerships ===
Students at the Josef Korbel School often pursue internship opportunities as part of their degree program. Students have interned with the U.S. Department of State, the U.S. Department of Defense, the United Nations, the FBI, the OECD, and World Vision International, among others.

The Josef Korbel School participates in a Washington, D.C., program with the University of Pittsburgh Graduate School of Public and International Affairs and Syracuse University's Maxwell School of Citizenship and Public Affairs. For the past five years, Korbel, GSPIA and the Maxwell School have operated the Global Security and Development Program, which combines professional internships with graduate courses taught by adjunct faculty drawn from the Washington, D.C., area's pool of experts in international relations and economics. Another study program outside of Denver offered by the school is its Geneva Program, a six-month exchange program allowing ten Korbel students to take classes at the Graduate Institute of International and Development Studies in Geneva, Switzerland.
