= Derogability =

In human rights law, derogability is whether the right may be infringed in certain circumstances. A non-derogable right is one whose infringement is not justified under any circumstances, generally right to life and freedom from torture, inhuman, or degrading treatment.
