= Journal of Asian Security and International Affairs =

- Discipline: Politics & International relations
- Language: English
- Edited by: Rajat Ganguly

Publication details
- History: Jan 2014
- Publisher: Sage Publications India Pvt Ltd
- Frequency: Triannual
- Impact factor: 0.8

Standard abbreviations
- ISO 4: J. Asian Secur. Int. Aff.

Indexing
- ISSN: 2347-7970 (print); 2349-0039 (web)

Links
- Journal homepage; Online access; Online archive

The Journal of Asian Security and International Affairs is an international peer reviewed academic journal that provides platform for discussion on domestic and international political issues and developments with national and regional security concerns and implications.

The Journal focuses on the main sub-regions of Asia – Central and West Asia; South Asia; Northeast Asia; Southeast Asia; and Australasia.

The journal is a member of the Committee on Publication Ethics (COPE). It is edited by Rajat Ganguly.

== Abstracting and indexing ==
- Australian Political Studies Association (APSA)
- Clarivate Analytics: Emerging Sources Citation Index (ESCI)
- DeepDyve
- Dutch-KB
- J-Gate
- JSTOR
- OCLC
- Ohio
- Portico
- ProQuest: Politics Collection
- ProQuest: Social Science Premium Collection
- ProQuest: WPSA
- SCOPUS
- UGC-CARE (GROUP II)
