= Journal of Contemporary China =

- Discipline: Area studies
- Language: English
- Edited by: Suisheng Zhao

Publication details
- History: 1992-present
- Publisher: Routledge
- Frequency: 5/year
- Impact factor: 2.345 (2019)

Standard abbreviations
- ISO 4: J. Contemp. China

Indexing
- ISSN: 1067-0564 (print); 1469-9400 (web)

Links
- Journal homepage; Online access; Online archive

The Journal of Contemporary China is a multidisciplinary peer-reviewed academic journal on contemporary Chinese affairs. It is published five times per year by Routledge and covers issues such as Chinese politics, law, economy, culture, and foreign policy, among others. It was purported to be the only English-language journal edited in North America that provides exclusive information about contemporary Chinese affairs for scholars, business people and government policy-makers.

As of 2025, the journal's editor is Suisheng Zhao (Josef Korbel School of International Studies, University of Denver). Some scholars affiliated with the journal have also contributed to articles published by Brookings and the Center for Strategic and International Studies.

== Abstracting and indexing ==
The journal is abstracted and indexed in the Social Sciences Citation Index and is listed in the Journal Citation Reports with an impact factor of 0.953 in the category "Area Studies" in 2013. It is also indexed in America: History & Life, British Humanities Index, CSA Abstracts, GEOBASE, Historical Abstracts, International Political Science Abstracts, International Development Abstracts, and MLA International Bibliography.
