= Special Tribunal for the Crime of Aggression against Ukraine =

Ad hoc tribunal created in 2025

- Спеціальний трибунал за злочин агресії проти України (Ukrainian)
- Established
- Jurisdiction: Ukraine
- Location: The Hague, Netherlands
- Authorised by: Agreement between Ukraine and CoE on the Establishment of the Special Tribunal for the Crime of Aggression against Ukraine
- Judge term length: 9 years maximum
- Number of positions: 15 seats
- Language: English (working)
- Type of tribunal: Ad hoc; International
- Website: Special Tribunal for the Crime of Aggression against Ukraine

President
- Currently

Prosecutor
- Currently

The Special Tribunal for the Crime of Aggression against Ukraine (STCAU or STCA French: Tribunal spécial pour le crime d'agression contre l'Ukraine) is an ad hoc international criminal tribunal aimed at prosecuting individuals responsible for the Russian invasion of Ukraine under the legal concept of crimes of aggression, as a complement to the existing International Criminal Court investigation in Ukraine.

An agreement between the Council of Europe and Ukraine to establish the tribunal was signed on 25 June 2025 in Strasbourg. The agreement sets out the conditions for establishing the tribunal and includes its statute in an annex. As of 26 March 2026, the tribunal had not yet been established.

== Background ==
In 2022 and 2023, several international bodies announced their support for establishing a tribunal for prosecuting the crime of aggression against Ukraine, including the Council of Europe, the European Commission, the NATO Parliamentary Assembly and the European Parliament.

=== Proposals ===
In April 2022 the Parliamentary Assembly of the Council of Europe (PACE) called for an ad hoc international criminal tribunal. In September 2022, the Council of Europe proposed to create a tribunal that would have a mandate to "investigate and prosecute the crime of aggression" committed by "the political and military leadership of the Russian Federation." Under the Council of Europe's proposal, the tribunal should be located in Strasbourg, "apply the definition of the crime of aggression" established in customary international law and "have the power to issue international arrest warrants and not be limited by State immunity or the immunity of heads of State and government and other State officials."

The government of Ukraine called for the establishment of such a tribunal.

In November 2022 the NATO Parliamentary Assembly designated the Russian Federation as a terrorist organization and called upon the international community to "take collective action towards the establishment of an international tribunal to prosecute the crime of aggression committed by Russia with its war against Ukraine." The European Commission said that the European Union (EU) would work to establish an ad hoc criminal tribunal to investigate and prosecute Russia's crime of aggression. In the same month the European Parliament also designated Russia as a state sponsor of terrorism, citing attacks against civilians, war crimes, and atrocities.

On 19 January 2023, the European Parliament called for the creation of an international tribunal to carry out investigations and prosecutions for Russian and Belarusian responsibility for the crime of aggression, complementary to the International Criminal Court investigation in Ukraine. The vote passed with 472 votes in favour, 19 against and 33 abstentions.

==== Core group ====
In late February 2023, Ukrainian foreign minister Dmytro Kuleba stated that a "core group" for creating the tribunal existed, including representation from Guatemala. In March 2025, the core group held its fourteenth and final meeting, finishing the technical preparation of drafts of three documents: a bilateral agreement between Ukraine and the Council of Europe (CoE) to establish the tribunal; the tribunal's statutes; and a management document. Hosting of the tribunal was likely to be in The Hague. It was expected that trials in absentia for prosecuting Russian leaders while they remained in office would be excluded. Planned formalisation of the agreements was scheduled for signing by Ukrainian authorities on 9 May 2025, to be followed by a vote by the Parliamentary Assembly of the Council of Europe (PACE).

=== International Centre for the Prosecution of the Crime of Aggression ===
Following European Union (EU) supported negotiations in March 2023, and given that neither Ukraine nor Russia had at that time ratified the 2010 ICC Kampala Amendments to the Rome Statute that added the crime of aggression alongside war crimes, crimes against humanity and genocide to ICC jurisdiction, the International Centre for the Prosecution of the Crime of Aggression (ICPA) was created in July 2023 by Eurojust to gather evidence and coordinate judicial actions related to the Russian invasion of Ukraine as a crime of aggression. The creation of the centre was seen as a first step towards creating a tribunal. Aims of the ICPA would include supporting exchange of evidence and coordination of investigative and prosecutorial strategies. An EU joint investigation team including Ukrainian, Lithuanian, Latvia, Estonian, Polish and Romanian representatives participated in establishing the ICPA.

The creation of the ICPA was the first institutional action to investigate a specific crime of aggression since World War II. The Kampala Amendments giving the ICC jurisdiction for crimes of aggression became effective in 2018, with an exception in Article 15bis (5) of the updated Statute that excludes jurisdiction when the crime is done on the territory of, or by nationals of, a state that is not an ICC member state. Ukraine was not a member state at the time of the full-scale invasion, having not yet ratified the Rome Statute, nor were Russia and Belarus. The ICC declared its willingness to support and cooperate with the ICPA.

== Steps towards creation ==
On 9 May 2025, representatives of 35 states and the Council of Europe (CoE) met in Lviv and, with support from High Representative of the European Union Kaja Kallas and EU Commissioner Michael McGrath, agreed to proceed with creating the proposed tribunal, stating that legal instruments were technically complete. A followup meeting on 13–14 May in Luxembourg by the Committee of Ministers of the Council of Europe was scheduled for further formal steps in creating the tribunal.

On 25 June 2025, the statute of the Special Tribunal was officially published as an annex to a formal legal agreement between the Council of Europe and Ukraine.

By early December 2025, according to Kateryna Rashevska of the Ukrainian NGO Regional Center for Human Rights, the EU had provided €10 million in funding for the tribunal, The Hague had been chosen as the location of the tribunal, and the practical creation of the tribunal was expected "by 2026 or 2027". Veronika Sentsov-Velch, the director of the Ukrainian section of Amnesty International, predicted that the tribunal's initial investigations would focus on "a group of approximately 20 high-ranking Russian officials".

=== Enlarged Partial Agreement ===
In November 2025, Lithuania expressed its intention to support the Tribunal by signing a document called the Enlarged Partial Agreement. By April 2026, 17 European countries had signed the agreement, as had Costa Rica.

By 15 May 2026, the date of a Committee of Ministers session in Chișinău, altogether 34 CoE members states, Costa Rica, Australia and the EU had signed the Enlarged Partial Agreement. At the meeting, Secretary General of the Council of Europe, Alain Berset, expressed his wish for the political commitment to be followed by funding and other practical steps towards creating the Tribunal. Dutch foreign minister Tom Berendsen stated that the Netherlands had agreed to "host the initial phase" of the Tribunal in The Hague.

=== Infrastructure creation ===
Around January 2026, the Special Tribunal Advance Team was created by the COE and the EU to establish the organisational structure of the Special Tribunal, on a time scale of up to 24 months under an already allocated €10 million budget, or on an alternative scale based on the Enlarged Partial Agreement. This phase was described as the "skeleton phase" by Ukrainian officials. Several workshops were held in The Hague as part of the organising process.

== Statute of the Tribunal ==
The Tribunal has jurisdiction to prosecute individuals bearing the greatest responsibility for the crime of aggression committed against Ukraine, applying its own Statute, the Rules of Procedure and Evidence, relevant international treaties, customary international law and, where necessary, the criminal law of Ukraine.

Article 1 contains no time limitation. This authorises the Tribunal to prosecute not only those responsible for the 2022 invasion but also those responsible for the illegal invasion and annexation of Crimea in 2014. This contrasts with the Registry of Damage Caused by the Aggression of the Russian Federation against Ukraine, created by the Council of Europe, which is limited to damages since 24 February 2022.

Like the International Criminal Court, the Tribunal guarantees fundamental procedural safeguards, including the right to a fair trial, the right not to be tried twice for the same conduct, the presumption of innocence, and the right to remain silent.

=== Organisation of the Tribunal ===
The Special Tribunal consists of three main organs: the Chambers, the Office of the Prosecutor, and the Registry.

==== Chambers ====
The Chambers are composed of:

- One judge acting as the Pre-Trial Judge, who reviews the indictment and can issue orders and warrants.
- Three judges sitting in the Trial Chamber, who conduct the trial, rule on the evidence, and render judgments and sentences.
- Five judges in the Appeals Chamber, who decide on appeals against convictions, acquittals or sentences.

Judges are elected to a roster of 15 for staggered nine-year terms. They must be of high moral character and fully independent. No two judges may be nationals of the same State.

The President of the Tribunal is elected by the judges for a renewable three-year term and presides over the Appeals Chamber. The Pre-Trial Judge, unlike the ICC's Pre-Trial Chamber of three judges, resembles the single judge formation used by the European Court of Human Rights for filtering admissibility.

==== Office of the Prosecutor ====
The Office of the Prosecutor is an independent organ of the Tribunal, responsible for conducting impartial investigations and prosecutions of those who bear the greatest responsibility for the crime of aggression against Ukraine.

The Prosecutor must be a person of high moral character, demonstrating the highest level of professional competence, with substantial experience in conducting complex investigations and prosecutions of serious criminal cases.

The Prosecutor is assisted by at least one Deputy Prosecutor and other staff as necessary to perform duties effectively and efficiently. Both the Prosecutor and Deputy Prosecutors are elected by secret ballot by an absolute majority of the Management Committee members, based on a shortlist prepared by an independent advisory panel.

The Prosecutor and Deputies cannot seek or receive instructions from any government or authority, and may not engage in any other professional occupation while in office.

To ensure impartiality, any person investigated or prosecuted can request the disqualification of the Prosecutor or Deputy Prosecutors on grounds of conflict of interest or lack of independence; such requests are decided by the Appeals Chamber.

Investigations are initiated by the Prosecutor General of Ukraine "referring" any criminal cases, information or evidence to the Prosecutor of the Special Tribunal.

==== Registry ====
The Registry is the principal administrative organ of the Tribunal and is responsible for its overall administration and servicing.

The Registry is headed by the Registrar, who must be a person of high moral character with extensive experience in managing international criminal justice institutions. The Registrar is elected by the judges sitting in plenary session and formally appointed by the Secretary General of the Council of Europe for a renewable four-year term.

The Registry includes several specialised units:

- A Victims and Witnesses Unit, which provides protective measures, security arrangements, counselling, and other assistance for witnesses and victims who are at risk due to their testimony. It also organises collective representation of victims before the Tribunal.
- A Detention Unit, which manages the conditions of detention of suspects and accused persons.
- An independent Defence Unit, which upholds the rights of the defence by maintaining a list of defence counsel, providing legal research, evidence collection support, advice, and appearing before the Tribunal on specific issues if needed.

The Registrar acts as the official channel of communication of the Tribunal with States and other entities (except where the Prosecutor has direct channels of communication under the Statute). The Registrar may also coordinate with national authorities to take custody of accused persons and is responsible for internal security at the Tribunal’s premises in consultation with the President, Prosecutor, and the host State.

Appointments to the Registry’s staff must ensure geographical balance, gender representation, and high professional competence.

==== Working language and rules of procedure ====
The working language of the Tribunal is English. The Rules of Procedure and Evidence may authorise the use of other languages in specific circumstances, in line with the Council of Europe’s official languages (which are English and French).

The Rules of Procedure and Evidence govern the conduct of investigations, pre-trial, trial and appeal phases, admission of evidence, victim representation, witness protection, data protection, and cooperation with other international bodies. They are adopted by the judges in plenary session by a two-thirds majority, and must meet the highest standards of international criminal procedure to ensure fair and expeditious proceedings. Amendments can be proposed by States parties, judges, the Prosecutor, or the Registrar, and follow the same adoption procedure. In case of conflict, the Statute prevails over the Rules.

=== Prosecutions ===
The Pre-Trial Judge examines the indictment prepared by the Prosecutor. If satisfied that there is sufficient evidence to provide reasonable grounds to believe that a person committed the alleged crime, the indictment is confirmed.

If confirmed, the Pre-Trial Judge may issue orders and warrants for arrest, detention, surrender or transfer of the suspect.

Although functional immunity does not apply to heads of State or government officials, if the indictment concerns a sitting Head of State, Head of Government or Minister of Foreign Affairs, the proceedings are suspended until they no longer hold office or an appropriate waiver is granted.

The Tribunal may conduct trials in absentia if the accused fails to appear after due notification. If convicted in absentia, the person has the right to a retrial if later present in person.

=== Penalties and enforcement ===
The written decision of the Trial Chamber judges is rendered within ten months following the closing date of the pleadings, except in particular circumstances justifying a fifteen-month period. This is the first time that the statute of an international criminal tribunal imposes a judgment deadline.

The Tribunal may impose prison sentences of up to 30 years, or exceptionally a life sentence if justified by the extreme gravity of the crime and the individual circumstances. Fines and confiscation of assets can be ordered in addition to imprisonment. This is consistent with Rome Statute standards for penalties.

Enforcement of sentences takes place in States that have concluded agreements with the Tribunal, or in Ukraine if no agreement exists. Sentences cannot be enforced in the host State.

== Predictions ==
In May 2026, Euronews predicted that the Tribunal would aim to prosecute Russian President Vladimir Putin.

== Analysis ==
=== Before June 2025 ===
In 2023, some international lawyers criticized the proposed tribunal. Kevin Jon Heller stated practical concerns, including obtaining suspects and evidence, predicted that the tribunal would not necessarily "be able to prosecute Russian officials who would be entitled to immunity ratione personae", and expressed worries about the "selectivity of international criminal justice" that it would express. Sergey Vasiliev argued that an ad hoc tribunal would be unable to secure the presence of Russian President Vladimir Putin or other defendants in the absence of Russian cooperation.

In contrast, Carrie McDougall argued that an ad hoc tribunal was the best available option to try this particular case of aggression for which the International Criminal Court lacks jurisdiction.

The idea is also supported by Evhen Tsybulenko and Henna Rinta-Pollari, who stated: "...the most appropriate approach to prosecuting the crime in the context of the Russo-Ukrainian war is to establish an international ad hoc tribunal, either through a treaty signed by the United Nations and Ukraine on the basis of a referral from the United Nations General Assembly and the United Nations Secretary-General or a multilateral treaty between Ukraine and other states supported by the United Nations".

=== June 2025–present ===
In June 2025, Pavel Latushko of the Belarusian opposition institution National Anti-Crisis Management stated his certainty that Belarusian President Alexander Lukashenko would be indicted by the Special Tribunal, since according to Latushko, Lukashenko's responsibility in allowing Russian forces to use Belarusian territory to invade Ukraine constitutes aggression under Article 3 of United Nations General Assembly Resolution 3314 (XXIX).

Law professor Kevin Jon Heller felt that the requirement requiring all judges to be of different nationalities removed the possibility of providing training to Ukrainian judges, since at most one Ukrainian judge could participate at any time. He objected to the range of possible penalties, arguing in favour of life sentences for leadership in the crime of aggression. Heller strongly objected to Article 23(1), which gives the Ukrainian Prosecutor General sole authority for initiating legal cases. He stated that the article effectively gives Ukraine control over the tribunal, which he suggests is unprecedented in the case of international criminal tribunals, and subjects the tribunal to the risk of political changes in Ukraine or corruption of the Ukrainian Prosecutor General.

Kate McInnes, director of the Canadian law firm Arendt Chamber, stated that the temporary immunity for heads of state, heads of government, and foreign ministers provided in Article 23(5) of the Statute applies to the people most likely to be responsible for a possible crime of aggression (which is a leadership crime). Moreover, the perpetrators of the aggression against Ukraine are generally authoritarian (Russian, Belarusian, or North Korean) leaders who have consolidated power in order to retain it until their death (or until a regime crisis). Consequently, McInnes argues that the Statute has a practical effect of granting lifetime immunity to the perpetrators of the crime of aggression. This temporary immunity was not included in the report of the 1919 Commission on the Responsibility of the Authors of the War, which rejected such immunity on the grounds that such impunity would "shock the conscience of civilized mankind". McInnes thus sees the Special Tribunal as weakening international law.

Chris Goebel of Public International Law & Policy Group saw the Special Tribunal as a significant development in international law, in that it is the first formal international tribunal for the crime of aggression created independently of the United Nations Security Council.

== See also ==
- Ad hoc international criminal tribunals
- Convention establishing an International Claims Commission for Ukraine – 2025 Council of Europe treaty
- Joint investigation team – EU members law enforcement and judicial team founded in 2014
- Kosovo Specialist Chambers – War crimes court
- International Criminal Tribunal for Rwanda – 1994 court of the United Nations Security Council
- International Criminal Tribunal for the former Yugoslavia – 1993–2017 Netherlands-based United Nations ad hoc court
- Legality of the 2022 Russian invasion of Ukraine
- War crimes in the 2022 Russian invasion of Ukraine
