= List of special tribunals and courts =

This is a list of special or exceptional tribunals and courts for the trying of people. Sometimes, courts that do not try people but curtail political freedoms are also derogatorily called "special tribunals," as well as courts that establish a privileged jurisdiction for powerful individuals or the government. List coverage is through history and worldwide.

- Tribunal del Santo Oficio de la Inquisición (Spanish Empire, 1478–1834)
- Tribunal do Santo Ofício da Inquisição (Portuguese Empire, 1536–1821)
- Suprema Congregatio Sanctae Romanae et Universalis Inquisitionis (Papal States, 1542–1860)
- Revolutionary Tribunal (France, 1792–1795)
- Exchequer Court of Canada (Canada, 1875–1971)
- Canadian Human Rights Commission (Canada, 1977–)
- Special Tribunal for the Defense of the State (Italy, 1926–1943)
- Tribunais Militares Especiais (Portugal, 1932–1945)
- Sondergerichte (Germany, 1933–1945)
- People's Court (Germany) (Germany, 1934–1945)
- Special Tribunal for the Defense of the RSI State (Italy, 1943–1945)
- Tribunais Plenários (Portugal, 1945–1974)
- International Military Tribunal (Nuremberg, occupied Germany, 1945–1946)
- International Military Tribunal for the Far East (Tokyo, occupied Japan, 1946–1948)
- Court of Parties (Egypt, 1977–)
- Tribunal de Orden Público (Spain, 1963–1977)
- Audiencia Nacional of Spain (Spain, 1977–)
- International Criminal Tribunal for the former Yugoslavia (The Hague, Netherlands, 1993–2017)
- International Criminal Tribunal for Rwanda (Tanzania, 1994–2015)
- Extraordinary Chambers in the Courts of Cambodia (Cambodja, 1997–2002)
- Special Court for Sierra Leone (Sierra Leone, 2002–2013)
- International Criminal Court (The Hague, Netherlands, 2002–present)
- Iraqi Special Tribunal (Iraq, 2003–2005; 2005–present as Iraqi High Tribunal, IHT, non-special tribunal)
- Special Tribunal for Lebanon (Leidschendam, Netherlands, 2009–2023)
- International Residual Mechanism for Criminal Tribunals (Tanzania and the Netherlands, 2010–present)
- Special international tribunal for the crime of aggression (Russian invasion of Ukraine) (proposed, 2023)

== See also ==
- International courts
- Political trial
- Show trial
- List of ad hoc international criminal courts
- List of impeachments of heads of state
- List of truth and reconciliation commissions
- Extraordinary courts
- Specialized courts
- A. V. Dicey's principle that people should not be judged by special courts.
