= European Union and the International Criminal Court =

Due to its status as a supranational union, the European Union (EU) is not a party to the International Criminal Court (ICC), but it has been one of the ICC's strongest supporters. The EU has given political, financial and technical support to the court, which is also based in its territory (The Hague, the Netherlands). All 27 EU member states are parties to the Rome Statute, which has a total of 125 member states worldwide. The 27 EU member states and the 125 member states of the ICC are obliged to detain and transfer any of the indicted individuals if any of them set foot on their territory.

== Positions and agreements ==
In 2001 the EU agreed to a common position, that is it has an EU-wide agreed foreign policy to strongly support the ICC. That position was updated in 2003 and combined with an action plan.

All EU member states have signed and ratified the Rome Statute which established the court, having come into force in 2002. However, in 2025 Hungary announced that it would withdraw from the ICC.

A 2006 co-operation agreement between the EU and ICC also obliges the EU and its members to assist the ICC, particularly by handing over classified information to the court. Examples of this cooperation already include supporting the ICC in the Democratic Republic of the Congo and Darfur, the latter including the EU Satellite Centre providing imagery and reports.

The Cotonou Agreement which the EU has with the African, Caribbean and Pacific Group of States includes a binding article signalling support of those states for the ICC and that they should "take steps towards ratifying and implementing the Rome Statute and related instruments". The EU has been inserting similar clauses in its association agreements and trade agreements around the world.

== Financial backing ==
Since other major world powers are not members of the ICC, the EU is the largest financial contributor to the court. Prior to the accession of Japan in 2007, their contributions was 75.6%, and subsequently it has been 57.4%. The EU also funds organisations promoting the court.

== Diplomatic backing ==
The EU has been the strongest supporter of the ICC and has supported it in nearly every instance. In ways it has operated as a public relations branch of the ICC and encouraged states around the world to adopt the Rome Statute (including putting it in trade agreements, as mentioned above). Due to the difficulty of the court's work, and opposition from major powers such as the US, this support has been indispensable and, likewise, the EU has been using the ICC as a tool to make its presence felt.
