= Joint investigation team =

EU members law enforcement and judicial team founded in 2014

A joint investigation team (abbr. JIT) is a law enforcement and judicial team set up jointly by national investigative agencies of European Union (EU) member states to handle cross-border crime. Joint investigation teams coordinate the investigations and prosecutions conducted in parallel by several countries. Such a team is formed based upon an agreement between competent authorities – both judicial (judges, prosecutors, investigative judges) and law enforcement – of two or more member states of the European Union. They can be backed up by Eurojust and Europol, the EU judicial and law enforcement cooperation agencies.

JITs are based on the Council Framework Decision 2002/465/JHA, and their terms of operation are defined on the Model Agreement for Setting up a Joint Investigation Team, as appended to EU Council Resolution 2017/C 18/01. However, their activities are governed by the national law of the member state that leads the JIT.

== History ==
After the shootdown of Malaysia Airlines Flight 17 in July 2014, a joint investigation team conducting criminal investigation with representatives from Australia, Belgium, Malaysia, the Netherlands and Ukraine was formed.

A JIT was formed in April 2020 by the French National Gendarmerie and the Dutch police to investigate the secure communication service EncroChat, used by some 60,000 subscribers at the time of its closure; nearly all of them were criminals.

== See also ==
- Special Tribunal for the Crime of Aggression against Ukraine – Ad hoc tribunal created in 2025
