= Audiencia Nacional =

High court in Spain

National Court
- Audiencia Nacional
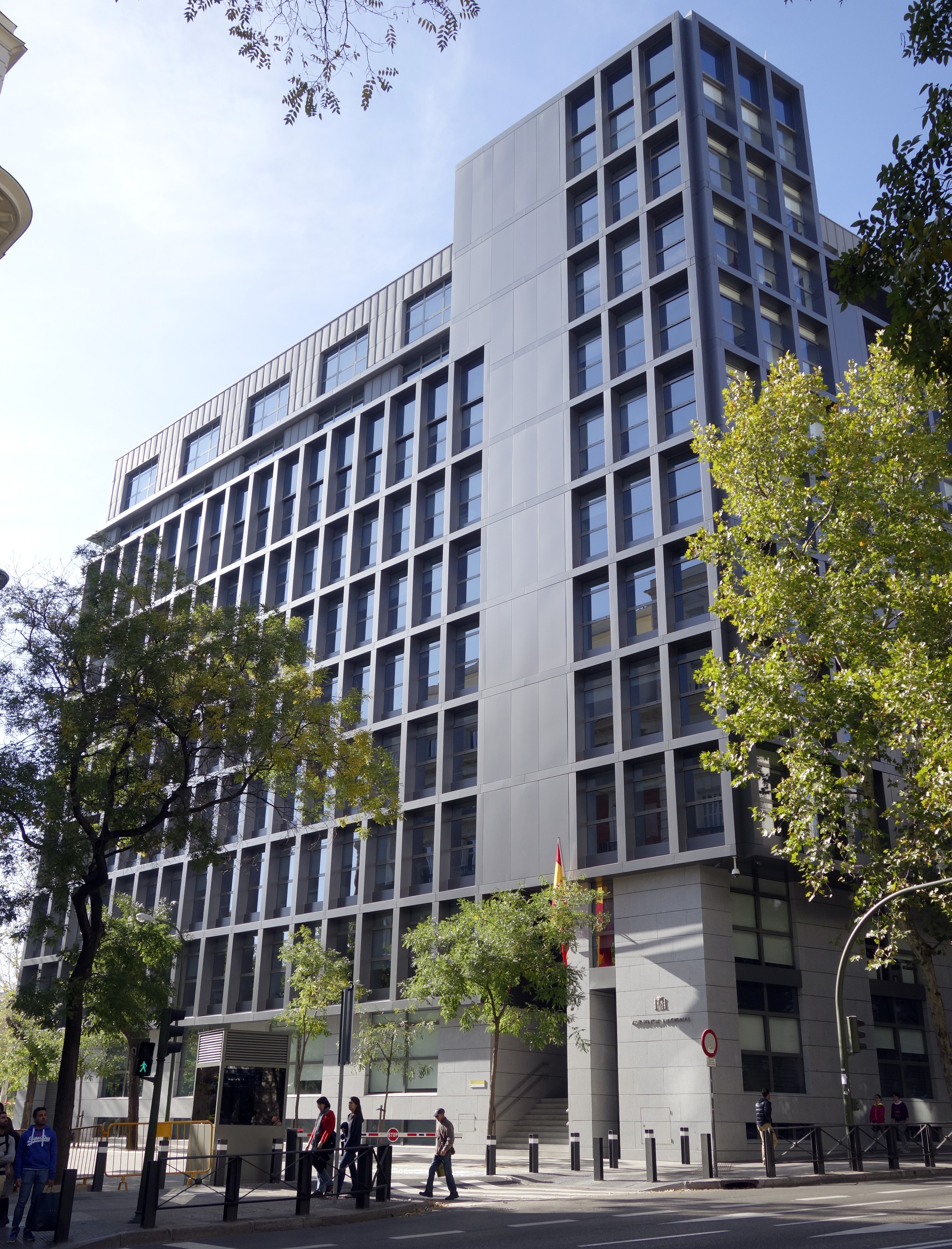
- Audiencia Nacional headquarters, in Madrid
- Established: January 4, 1977; 49 years ago
- Jurisdiction: Spain
- Location: Calle García Gutiérrez, 1, Madrid
- Authorised by: Judiciary Organic Act
- Appeals to: Supreme Court

President
- Currently: Juan Manuel Fernández Martínez
- Since: 25 March 2025

The Audiencia Nacional (Spanish pronunciation: [awˈðjen.θja naθjoˈnal]; English: National Court) is a high court in Spain with jurisdiction over all of the Spanish territory. It is specialised in certain kinds of crime, having original jurisdiction over major crimes such as those committed against the Crown and its members; terrorism; counterfeiting currency; credit/debit card and check fraud; certain kinds of business crime committed across regional borders; drug trafficking; food and medical fraud committed on a nationwide level; and international crimes which come under the competence of Spanish courts (LOPJ § 65). It also has appellate jurisdiction over the cases of the Criminal Chamber of the National Court (LOPJ § 64).

Most of the rulings of the National Court can ultimately be appealed before the Supreme Court. Its seat lies in Madrid, at Calle García Gutiérrez, 1, located across the Plaza Villa de Paris from the Supreme Court.

The Audiencia Nacional was created in 1977 at the same time as the Court of Public Order, an exceptional court created during the dictatorship of Francisco Franco, ceased to exist.

== Structure ==
The Audiencia is composed of its President, the Presidents of the Chambers, and the magistrates that the law specifies for each one of its courts and divisions.

The Audiencia includes the following chambers:

- Criminal Chamber, which is competent to try certain types of serious crimes such as terrorism, money laundering, genocide, etc., makes decisions about extradition demands by foreign countries and the execution of European arrest warrants, and hears appeals against rulings of the Central Criminal Courts (Juzgados Centrales de lo Penal).
- Appeals Chamber, which hears appeals against rulings of the Criminal Chamber.
- Administrative Chamber, which exercises judicial review of administrative decisions by senior officers (Ministers and Secretaries of State of the Government) and certain specialised agencies (Spanish Data Protection Agency, Concurrence Protection Commission, etc.)
- Social Chamber, which has jurisdiction over collective conflicts between businesspersons and workers.

== Related courts ==
Even when they are not part of the National Court, because they are in the same building, the Central Courts are popularly considered part of it. These courts have jurisdiction in all the national territory.

1. Central Criminal Courts (LOPJ § 89 bis). They prosecute the same crimes as the Criminal Chamber when they have sentence of less than five years of prison.
2. Central Instruction Courts (LOPJ § 88). These courts investigate the crimes that are then prosecuted by the Criminal Chamber of the National Court or the Central Criminal Courts.
3. Central Courts of Prison Vigilance (LOPJ § 94.4). They attend to the enforcement of the penalties imposed by the National Court or the Central Criminal Court
4. Central Minors Courts (LOPJ § 96.2). They prosecutes the same crimes as the National Court and the Central Criminal Court but when minors are accused.
5. Central Administrative Courts (LOPJ § 90.4). These courts a responsible for the appeals against dispositions and acts emanated from authorities, organisms, organs and public entities with competence over the national territory.

== Public Prosecutor's Office ==
The Public Prosecutor's Office of the National High Court is the body that exercises the functions of the Public Prosecutor's Office before this court and before the Central Courts. It is therefore involved in all criminal, contentious-administrative, and social proceedings heard by the National High Court and the Central Courts, except those that fall within the jurisdiction of the Special Prosecution Offices (Anti-Drug Prosecutor's Office and Anti-Corruption Prosecutor's Office). This prosecutor's office is composed of a Chief Prosecutor of the first category, a Lieutenant Prosecutor of the second category, and 16 prosecutors of the second category.

In terms of its organization, the Prosecutor's Office distributes the work among different services and coordination units. As of 2023, the departments of this prosecutor's office were: Deputy Prosecutor and Spokesperson; Terrorism; Economic Crimes; Prison Surveillance; Minors; Victim Support and ERE; International Cooperation; Immigration, Human Trafficking, and Universal Justice; European Arrest Warrants, Extraditions, Jurisprudence, and Documentation; Administrative and Social Litigation; Unsolved Crimes; Investigative and Pre-trial Proceedings.

The Public Prosecutor's Office has its headquarters at the National Court, with some

== See also ==
- Constitutional Court of Spain
- Judiciary of Spain
