= States parties to the Rome Statute =

State party Signatory that has not ratified State party that subsequently withdrew its membership Signatory that subsequently withdrew its signature Non-state party, non-signatory

The states parties to the Rome Statute of the International Criminal Court are those sovereign states that have ratified, or have otherwise become party to, the Rome Statute. The Rome Statute is the treaty that established the International Criminal Court, an international court that has jurisdiction over certain international crimes, including genocide, crimes against humanity, and war crimes that are committed by nationals of states parties or within the territory of states parties. States parties are legally obligated to co-operate with the Court when it requires, such as in arresting and transferring indicted persons or providing access to evidence and witnesses. States parties are entitled to participate and vote in proceedings of the Assembly of States Parties, which is the Court's governing body. Such proceedings include the election of such officials as judges and the prosecutor, the approval of the Court's budget, and the adoption of amendments to the Rome Statute.

== States parties ==
As of September 2026, there are 125 states parties to the Rome Statute.

State party	Signed	Ratified or acceded	Entry into force	A1	A2	A3	A4	A5	A6	A7
Afghanistan (Note: While the de facto Taliban government of Afghanistan declared its withdrawal from the ICC in February 2025, the former Islamic Republic of Afghanistan remains recognized as the legitimate government of Afghanistan by the UN and the ICC. See § Withdrawal for more information.)	—	10 February 2003	1 May 2003	—	—	—	—	—	—	—
Albania	18 July 1998	31 January 2003	1 May 2003	—	—	—	—	—	—	—
Andorra	18 July 1998	30 April 2001	1 July 2002	In force	In force	Ratified	In force	In force	In force	In force
Antigua and Barbuda	23 October 1998	18 June 2001	1 July 2002	—	—	—	—	—	—	—
Argentina	8 January 1999	8 February 2001	1 July 2002	In force	In force	—	—	—	—	—
Armenia (Note: On 15 November 2023, prior to ratifying the Rome Statute, Armenia submitted a declaration, dated the same day, accepting the Court's jurisdiction for "genocide, crimes against humanity, and war crimes ... starting from 10 May 2021," pursuant to article 12, paragraph 3, of the Statute. Armenia subsequently acceded to the Rome Statute, on 14 November 2023, and is therefore now a state party.)	1 October 1999	14 November 2023	1 February 2024	—	—	—	—	—	—	—
Australia	9 December 1998	1 July 2002	1 September 2002	—	—	—	—	—	—	—
Austria	7 October 1998	28 December 2000	1 July 2002	In force	In force	Ratified	—	—	—	—
Bangladesh	16 September 1999	23 March 2010	1 June 2010	—	—	—	—	—	—	—
Barbados	8 September 2000	10 December 2002	1 March 2003	—	—	—	—	—	—	—
Belgium	10 September 1998	28 June 2000	1 July 2002	In force	In force	Ratified	In force	In force	In force	In force
Belize	5 April 2000	5 April 2000	1 July 2002	—	—	—	—	—	—	—
Benin	24 September 1999	22 January 2002	1 July 2002	—	—	—	—	—	—	—
Bolivia	17 July 1998	27 June 2002	1 September 2002	—	In force	—	—	—	—	—
Bosnia and Herzegovina	17 July 1998	11 April 2002	1 July 2002	—	—	—	—	—	—	—
Botswana	8 September 2000	8 September 2000	1 July 2002	In force	In force	—	—	—	—	—
Brazil	7 February 2000	20 June 2002	1 September 2002	—	—	—	—	—	—	—
Bulgaria	11 February 1999	11 April 2002	1 July 2002	—	—	—	—	—	—	—
Burkina Faso (Note: Burkina Faso formally notified the depositary of its intentions to withdraw from the Statute, effective 24 June 2027.)	30 November 1998	16 April 2004	1 July 2004	—	—	—	—	—	—	—
Cambodia	23 October 2000	11 April 2002	1 July 2002	—	—	—	—	—	—	—
Canada	18 December 1998	7 July 2000	1 July 2002	—	—	—	—	—	—	—
Cape Verde	28 December 2000	10 October 2011	1 January 2012	—	—	—	—	—	—	—
Central African Republic	12 December 1999	3 October 2001	1 July 2002	—	—	—	—	—	—	—
Chad (Note: Chad formally notified the depositary of its intentions to withdraw from the Statute, effective 27 July 2027.)	20 October 1999	1 November 2006	1 January 2007	—	—	—	—	—	—	—
Chile	11 September 1998	29 June 2009	1 September 2009	In force	In force	—	In force	In force	In force	—
Colombia (Note: Upon ratification, Colombia made a declaration under article 124 of the Rome Statute to exempt war crimes committed by its nationals or on its territory from the jurisdiction of the Court for a period of seven years.)	10 December 1998	5 August 2002	1 November 2002	—	—	—	—	—	—	—
Comoros	22 September 2000	18 August 2006	1 November 2006	—	—	—	—	—	—	—
Congo, Democratic Republic of the	8 September 2000	11 April 2002	1 July 2002	—	—	—	—	—	—	—
Congo, Republic of the	17 July 1998	3 May 2004	1 August 2004	—	—	—	—	—	—	—
Cook Islands	—	18 July 2008	1 October 2008	—	—	—	—	—	—	—
Costa Rica	7 October 1998	7 June 2001	1 July 2002	In force	In force	—	—	—	—	—
Côte d'Ivoire (Note: On 1 October 2003, prior to ratifying the Rome Statute, the Ivorian government submitted a declaration, dated 18 April 2003, accepting the Court's jurisdiction for "acts committed on Ivorian territory since the events of 19 September 2002," pursuant to article 12, paragraph 3, of the Statute. Côte d'Ivoire subsequently acceded to the Rome Statute, on 15 February 2013, and is therefore now a state party.)	30 November 1998	15 February 2013	1 May 2013	—	—	—	—	—	—	—
Croatia	12 October 1998	21 May 2001	1 July 2002	In force	In force	Ratified	In force	In force	In force	In force
Cyprus	15 October 1998	7 March 2002	1 July 2002	In force	In force	Ratified	In force	In force	In force	In force
Czech Republic	13 April 1999	21 July 2009	1 October 2009	In force	In force	—	In force	In force	In force	—
Denmark (Note: The Rome Statute entered into force for the Faroe Islands on 1 October 2006 and for Greenland on 1 October 2004.)	25 September 1998	21 June 2001	1 July 2002	In force	In force	Ratified	In force	In force	In force	In force
Djibouti	7 October 1998	5 November 2002	1 February 2003	—	—	—	—	—	—	—
Dominica	—	12 February 2001	1 July 2002	—	—	—	—	—	—	—
Dominican Republic	8 September 2000	12 May 2005	1 August 2005	—	—	—	—	—	—	—
Ecuador	7 October 1998	5 February 2002	1 July 2002	—	In force	—	—	—	—	—
El Salvador	—	3 March 2016	1 June 2016	In force	In force	—	—	—	—	—
Estonia	27 December 1999	30 January 2002	1 July 2002	In force	In force	Ratified	In force	In force	In force	In force
Fiji	29 November 1999	29 November 1999	1 July 2002	—	—	—	—	—	—	—
Finland	7 October 1998	29 December 2000	1 July 2002	In force	In force	Ratified	—	—	—	—
France (Note: Upon ratification, France made a declaration under article 124 of the Rome Statute to exempt war crimes committed by its nationals or on its territory from the jurisdiction of the Court for a period of seven years. France withdrew its declaration on 13 August 2008, with effect from 15 June 2008.)	18 July 1998	9 June 2000	1 July 2002	—	—	Ratified	—	—	—	—
Gabon	22 December 1998	20 September 2000	1 July 2002	—	—	—	—	—	—	—
Gambia, The (Note: The Gambia formally notified the depositary of its intentions to withdraw from the Statute, effective 10 November 2017. However, this notification was rescinded effective 10 February 2017.)	4 December 1998	28 June 2002	1 September 2002	—	—	—	—	—	—	—
Georgia	18 July 1998	5 September 2003	1 December 2003	In force	In force	—	—	—	—	—
Germany	10 December 1998	11 December 2000	1 July 2002	In force	In force	Ratified	In force	In force	In force	In force
Ghana	18 July 1998	20 December 1999	1 July 2002	—	—	—	—	—	—	—
Greece	18 July 1998	15 May 2002	1 August 2002	—	—	—	—	—	—	—
Grenada	—	19 May 2011	1 August 2011	—	—	—	—	—	—	—
Guatemala	—	2 April 2012	1 July 2012	—	—	—	—	—	—	—
Guinea	7 September 2000	14 July 2003	1 October 2003	—	—	—	—	—	—	—
Guyana	28 December 2000	24 September 2004	1 December 2004	In force	In force	—	—	—	—	—
Honduras	7 October 1998	1 July 2002	1 September 2002	—	—	—	—	—	—	—
Hungary (Note: Hungary formally notified the depositary of its intentions to withdraw from the Statute, effective 2 June 2026. However, this notification was rescinded effective 29 May 2026.)	15 January 1999	30 November 2001	1 July 2002	—	—	—	—	—	—	—
Iceland	26 August 1998	25 May 2000	1 July 2002	—	In force	—	—	—	—	—
Ireland	7 October 1998	11 April 2002	1 July 2002	Ratified	In force	Ratified	Ratified	Ratified	Ratified	Ratified
Italy	18 July 1998	26 July 1999	1 July 2002	In force	In force	Ratified	—	—	—	—
Japan	—	17 July 2007	1 October 2007	—	—	—	—	—	—	—
Jordan	7 October 1998	11 April 2002	1 July 2002	—	—	—	—	—	—	—
Kiribati	—	26 November 2019	1 February 2020	—	—	—	—	—	—	—
Kenya	11 August 1999	15 March 2005	1 June 2005	—	—	—	—	—	—	—
Korea, South	8 March 2000	13 November 2002	1 February 2003	—	—	—	—	—	—	—
Latvia	22 April 1999	28 June 2002	1 September 2002	In force	In force	Ratified	In force	In force	In force	In force
Lesotho	30 November 1998	6 September 2000	1 July 2002	—	—	—	—	—	—	—
Liberia	17 July 1998	22 September 2004	1 December 2004	—	—	—	—	—	—	—
Liechtenstein	18 July 1998	2 October 2001	1 July 2002	In force	In force	Ratified	In force	—	—	In force
Lithuania	10 December 1998	12 May 2003	1 August 2003	In force	In force	Ratified	In force	In force	In force	In force
Luxembourg	13 October 1998	8 September 2000	1 July 2002	In force	In force	—	In force	In force	In force	In force
Madagascar	18 July 1998	14 March 2008	1 June 2008	—	—	—	—	—	—	—
Malawi	2 March 1999	19 September 2002	1 December 2002	—	—	—	—	—	—	—
Maldives	—	21 September 2011	1 December 2011	—	—	—	—	—	—	—
Mali (Note: Mali formally notified the depositary of its intentions to withdraw from the Statute, effective 24 June 2027.)	17 July 1998	16 August 2000	1 July 2002	—	—	—	—	—	—	—
Malta	17 July 1998	29 November 2002	1 February 2003	In force	In force	—	—	—	—	—
Marshall Islands	6 September 2000	7 December 2000	1 July 2002	—	—	—	—	—	—	—
Mauritius	11 November 1998	5 March 2002	1 July 2002	In force	—	—	—	—	—	—
Mexico	7 September 2000	28 October 2005	1 January 2006	In force	—	—	In force	In force	In force	—
Moldova	8 September 2000	12 October 2010	1 January 2011	—	—	—	—	—	—	—
Mongolia	29 December 2000	11 April 2002	1 July 2002	In force	In force	—	—	—	—	—
Montenegro (Note: Montenegro succeeded to the Rome Statute on 3 June 2006, the date of its independence from Serbia and Montenegro, per a declaration it sent to the Secretary-General of the United Nations, which was received on 23 October 2006.)	—	23 October 2006	3 June 2006	—	—	—	—	—	—	—
Namibia	27 October 1998	25 June 2002	1 September 2002	—	—	—	—	—	—	—
Nauru (Note: Nauru formally notified the depositary of its intentions to withdraw from the Statute, effective 23 September 2027.)	13 December 2000	12 November 2001	1 July 2002	—	—	—	—	—	—	—
Netherlands	18 July 1998	17 July 2001	1 July 2002	In force	In force	Ratified	In force	In force	In force	In force
New Zealand (Note: The Rome Statute is not in force for Tokelau.)	7 October 1998	7 September 2000	1 July 2002	In force	—	—	In force	In force	In force	In force
Niger (Note: Niger formally notified the depositary of its intentions to withdraw from the Statute, effective 18 June 2027.)	17 July 1998	11 April 2002	1 July 2002	—	In force	—	—	—	—	—
Nigeria	1 June 2000	27 September 2001	1 July 2002	—	—	—	—	—	—	—
North Macedonia	7 October 1998	6 March 2002	1 July 2002	In force	In force	—	—	—	—	—
Norway	28 August 1998	16 February 2000	1 July 2002	In force	—	Ratified	In force	In force	In force	In force
Palestine (Note: On 22 January 2009, prior to ratifying the Rome Statute, the Palestinian National Authority submitted a declaration, dated the previous day, accepting the Court's jurisdiction for "acts committed on the territory of Palestine since 1 July 2002," pursuant to article 12, paragraph 3, of the Statute. However, on 3 April 2012, the Prosecutor of the ICC deemed the declaration invalid because the Rome Statute only permits sovereign states to make such a declaration and Palestine was designated an "observer entity" within the United Nations (the body that is the depositary for the Rome Statute) at the time. On 29 November 2012, the United Nations General Assembly voted in favour of recognising Palestine as a non-member observer state. In November 2013, the Office of the Prosecutor concluded that this decision did "not cure the legal invalidity of the 2009 declaration." A second declaration accepting the court's jurisdiction was reportedly submitted in July 2014 by Palestine's Justice Minister Saleem al-Saqqa and General Prosecutor Ismaeil Jabr, but the prosecutor responded that only the head of state, head of government or minister of Foreign Affairs had the authority to make such a declaration. After failing to receive confirmation from Minister of Foreign Affairs Riyad al-Maliki during an August meeting that the declaration had been made on behalf of the Palestinian government, the Prosecutor concluded that the declaration was invalid because it did not come from an authority with the power to make it. On 2 September 2014, the Prosecutor clarified that if Palestine filed a new declaration, or acceded to the Rome Statute, it would be deemed valid. In December 2014, the assembly of state parties of the ICC recognized Palestine as a "state" without prejudice to any legal or other decisions taken by the court or any other organization. On 1 January 2015, a new declaration was submitted by Palestine, dated 31 December 2014, accepting the court's jurisdiction effective 13 June 2014. Palestine subsequently acceded to the Rome Statute on 2 January 2015, becoming a state party. The prosecutor launched a preliminary examination of the situation in Palestine on 16 January 2015, and on 22 January 2020 requested a ruling by the court on the territorial jurisdiction of the Rome Statute in Palestine. The ICC Pre-Trial Chamber ruled on 5 February 2021 that due to Palestine's accession to the Rome Statute, the ICC had jurisdiction over "territories occupied by Israel since 1967, namely Gaza and the West Bank, including East Jerusalem.") (Note: Canada filed a declaration stating that it does not recognize Palestine as a state and as such it does not consider the Rome Statute to be in force between it and Palestine.)	—	2 January 2015	1 April 2015	In force	In force	—	—	—	—	—
Panama	18 July 1998	21 March 2002	1 July 2002	In force	In force	—	—	—	—	—
Paraguay	7 October 1998	14 May 2001	1 July 2002	In force	In force	—	—	—	—	—
Peru	7 December 2000	10 November 2001	1 July 2002	In force	In force	—	—	—	—	—
Poland	9 April 1999	12 November 2001	1 July 2002	In force	In force	Ratified	Ratified	Ratified	Ratified	Ratified
Portugal	7 October 1998	5 February 2002	1 July 2002	In force	In force	Ratified	—	—	—	In force
Romania	7 July 1999	11 April 2002	1 July 2002	In force	—	Ratified	In force	In force	In force	In force
Saint Kitts and Nevis	—	22 August 2006	1 November 2006	—	—	—	—	—	—	—
Saint Lucia	27 August 1999	18 August 2010	1 November 2010	—	—	—	—	—	—	—
Saint Vincent and the Grenadines	—	3 December 2002	1 March 2003	—	—	—	—	—	—	—
Samoa	17 July 1998	16 September 2002	1 December 2002	In force	In force	—	—	—	—	—
San Marino	18 July 1998	13 May 1999	1 July 2002	In force	In force	Ratified	In force	In force	In force	In force
Senegal	18 July 1998	2 February 1999	1 July 2002	—	—	—	—	—	—	—
Serbia	19 December 2000	6 September 2001	1 July 2002	—	—	—	—	—	—	—
Seychelles	28 December 2000	10 August 2010	1 November 2010	In force	In force	Ratified	In force	In force	In force	In force
Sierra Leone	17 October 1998	15 September 2000	1 July 2002	—	—	—	—	—	—	—
Slovakia	23 December 1998	11 April 2002	1 July 2002	In force	In force	Ratified	In force	In force	In force	—
Slovenia	7 October 1998	31 December 2001	1 July 2002	In force	In force	Ratified	In force	In force	In force	In force
South Africa (Note: South Africa formally notified the depositary of its intentions to withdraw from the Statute, effective 19 October 2017. However, this notification was rescinded effective 7 March 2017.)	17 July 1998	27 November 2000	1 July 2002	—	—	—	—	—	—	—
Spain	18 July 1998	24 October 2000	1 July 2002	In force	In force	Ratified	In force	In force	In force	In force
Suriname	—	15 July 2008	1 October 2008	—	—	—	—	—	—	—
Sweden	7 October 1998	28 June 2001	1 July 2002	In force	In force	Ratified	In force	—	—	—
Switzerland	18 July 1998	12 October 2001	1 July 2002	In force	In force	Ratified	In force	In force	In force	In force
Tajikistan (Note: Tajikistan formally notified the depositary of its intentions to withdraw from the Statute, effective 20 November 2027.)	30 November 1998	5 May 2000	1 July 2002	—	—	—	—	—	—	—
Tanzania	29 December 2000	20 August 2002	1 November 2002	—	—	—	—	—	—	—
Timor-Leste	—	6 September 2002	1 December 2002	In force	In force	Ratified	—	—	—	—
Trinidad and Tobago	23 March 1999	6 April 1999	1 July 2002	In force	In force	—	—	—	—	—
Tunisia	—	24 June 2011	1 September 2011	—	—	—	—	—	—	—
Uganda	17 March 1999	14 June 2002	1 September 2002	—	—	—	—	—	—	—
Ukraine (Note: On 17 April 2014, prior to ratifying the Rome Statute, Ukraine submitted a declaration accepting the jurisdiction of the Court for a limited time period, pursuant to article 12, paragraph 3, of the Statute. Another declaration accepting jurisdiction indefinitely was submitted on 8 September 2015. Ukraine subsequently acceded to the Rome Statute, on 25 October 2024, and is therefore now a state party. Upon ratification, Ukraine made a declaration under article 124 of the Rome Statute to exempt war crimes under article 8 committed by its nationals from the jurisdiction of the Court for a period of seven years.)	20 January 2000	25 October 2024	1 January 2025	In force	In force	—	In force	In force	In force	In force
United Kingdom (Note: The Rome Statute entered into force for Akrotiri and Dhekelia; Anguilla; Bermuda; the British Virgin Islands; the Cayman Islands; the Falkland Islands; Montserrat; the Pitcairn Islands; Saint Helena, Ascension and Tristan da Cunha; and the Turks and Caicos Islands on 11 March 2010. The Statute entered into force for the Isle of Man on 1 February 2013. The Statute entered into force for Gibraltar on 20 April 2015.)	30 November 1998	4 October 2001	1 July 2002	—	—	—	—	—	—	—
Uruguay	19 December 2000	28 June 2002	1 September 2002	In force	In force	Ratified	In force	In force	In force	In force
Vanuatu	—	2 December 2011	1 February 2012	—	—	—	—	—	—	—
Venezuela (Note: Venezuela formally notified the depositary of its intentions to withdraw from the Statute, effective 24 July 2027.)	14 October 1998	7 June 2000	1 July 2002	—	—	—	—	—	—	—
Zambia	17 July 1998	13 November 2002	1 February 2003	—	—	—	—	—	—	—

=== Implementing legislation ===
The Rome Statute obliges states parties to cooperate with the Court in the investigation and prosecution of crimes, including the arrest and surrender of suspects. Part 9 of the Statute requires all states parties to “ensure that there are procedures available under their national law for all of the forms of cooperation which are specified under this Part”.

Under the Rome Statute's complementarity principle, the Court only has jurisdiction over cases where the relevant state is unwilling or unable to investigate and, if appropriate, prosecute the case itself. Therefore, many states parties have implemented national legislation to provide for the investigation and prosecution of crimes that fall under the jurisdiction of the Court.

As of October 2024, 68 states have adopted at least one piece of complementarity legislation, 59 have adopted at least one cooperation law, 52 have adopted neither, and 55 have adopted both, whereas 13 have implemented complementarity only and 4 have implemented cooperation only.

=== Timeline of signatures and ratifications/accessions ===
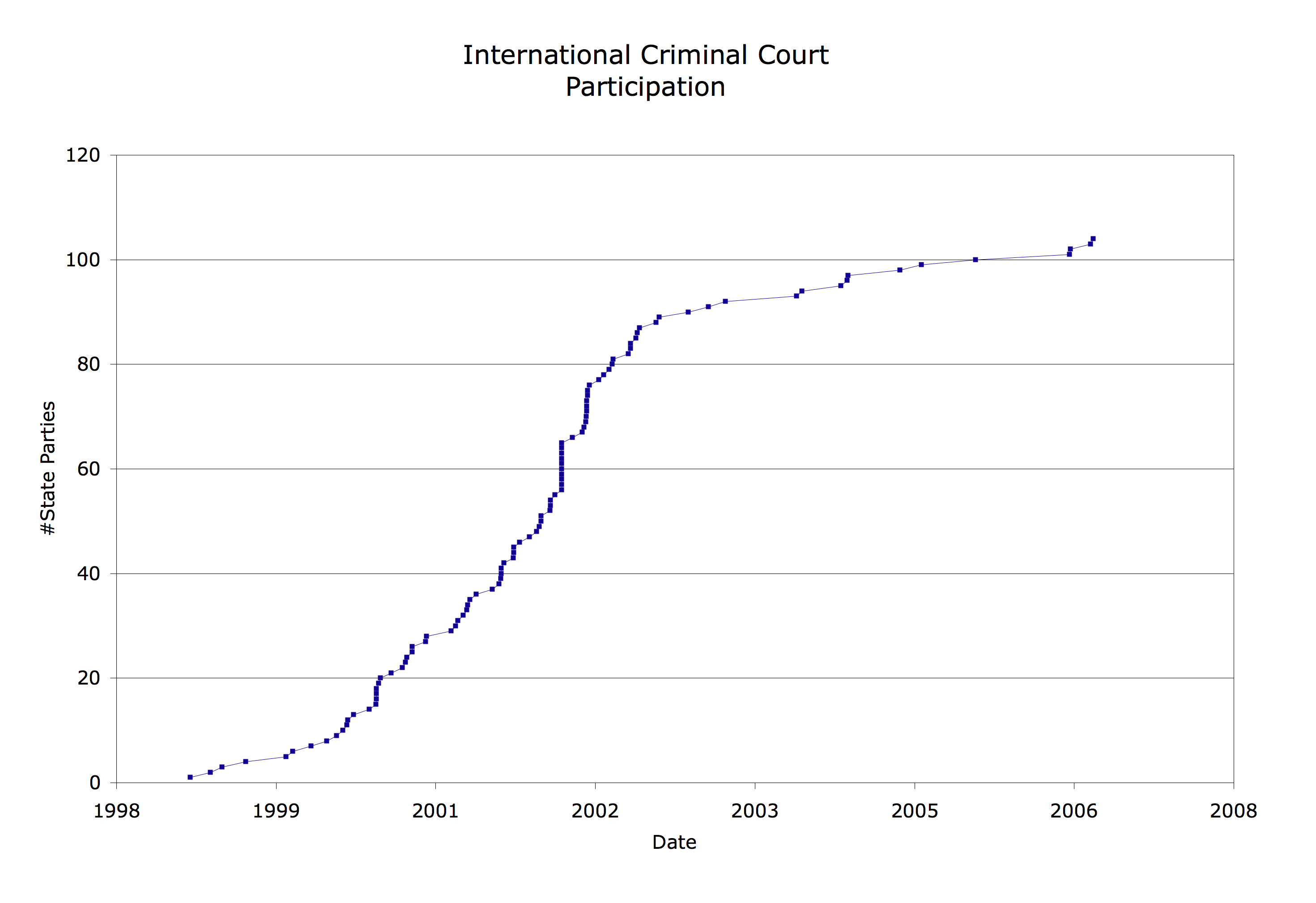
Total number of states parties from 1999 to 2006.

Date	Signatures		
31 December 1998	71		
31 December 1999	92		
31 December 2000	139		
Date	Ratifications/accessions	Remaining signatories	Denunciations
31 December 1998	0	71	0
31 December 1999	6	86	0
31 December 2000	27	112	0
31 December 2001	48	92	0
31 December 2002	87	55	0
31 December 2003	92	51	0
31 December 2004	97	46	0
31 December 2005	100	43	0
31 December 2006	104	41	0
31 December 2007	105	41	0
31 December 2008	108	40	0
31 December 2009	110	38	0
31 December 2010	114	34	0
31 December 2011	120	32	0
31 December 2012	121	32	0
31 December 2013	122	31	0
31 December 2014	122	31	0
31 December 2015	123	31	0
31 December 2016	124	31	0
31 December 2017	123	31	1
31 December 2018	123	31	1
31 December 2019	123	31	2
31 December 2020	123	31	2
31 December 2021	123	31	2
31 December 2022	123	31	2
31 December 2023	124	30	2
31 December 2024	125	29	2

States that have denounced the Rome Statute are no longer considered signatories.

=== Regional groups and minimum voting requirements ===
The number of states parties from the several United Nations regional groups has an influence on the regional minimum voting requirements during elections of judges. Paragraph 20(b) of the procedure for the nomination and election of judges of the Court states that each Party must vote for at least as many candidates from a regional group as would be required to bring the number of judges from that group to two. If, however, more than 16 states parties belong to the group, this target is increased to three.

The following table lists how many states parties there are from each regional group as of August 2024. After the accession of the Maldives on 1 December 2011, the Asia–Pacific Group became the last regional group to reach the threshold size of 17 members, just in time to increase the minimum voting requirement for this group in the 2011 election. Since then, the target for the regional minimum voting requirement has remained at three for all regional groups. This has resulted in at least three judges from each regional group sitting on the bench except during the term from 2020 to 2023, when there were only two judges from the Asia–Pacific group. Because only a single candidate from that group was nominated in the 2020 election, no minimum voting requirement was applied for the group, and the one nominee was not elected.

Group	Number of states parties
African Group	33
Asia–Pacific Group	19
Eastern European Group	20
Latin American and Caribbean Group	28
Western European and Others Group	25

== Withdrawal ==
Article 127 of the Rome Statute allows for states to withdraw from the ICC. Withdrawal takes effect one year after notification of the depositary, and has no effect on prosecution that has already started. As of September 2026, 11 states have given formal notice of their intention to withdraw from the statute, although three rescinded their notification before it came into effect.

State party	Signed	Ratified or acceded	Entry into force	Withdrawal notified	Withdrawal effective	Withdrawal rescinded
Withdrawals
Burundi	13 January 1999	21 September 2004	1 December 2004	27 October 2016	27 October 2017	—
Philippines	28 December 2000	30 August 2011	1 November 2011	17 March 2018 (Note: The legal validity of the Philippines' withdrawal was challenged at the Supreme Court of the Philippines, but was dismissed in a unanimous decision for being "moot and academic" two years after the country's official withdrawal from the tribunal.)	17 March 2019	—
Pending withdrawals
Niger	17 July 1998	11 April 2002	1 July 2002	18 June 2026	18 June 2027	—
Burkina Faso	30 November 1998	16 April 2004	1 July 2004	24 June 2026	24 June 2027	—
Mali	17 July 1998	16 August 2000	1 July 2002	24 June 2026	24 June 2027	—
Venezuela	14 October 1998	7 June 2000	1 July 2002	24 July 2026	24 July 2027	—
Chad	20 October 1999	1 November 2006	1 January 2007	27 July 2026	27 July 2027	—
Nauru	13 December 2000	12 November 2001	1 July 2002	23 September 2026	23 September 2027	—
Tajikistan	30 November 1998	5 May 2000	1 July 2002	20 November 2026	20 November 2027	—
Rescinded withdrawals
Gambia, The	4 December 1998	28 June 2002	1 September 2002	10 November 2016	—	10 February 2017
South Africa	17 July 1998	27 November 2000	1 July 2002	19 October 2016	—	7 March 2017
Hungary	15 January 1999	30 November 2001	1 July 2002	2 June 2025	—	29 May 2026

=== Burundi, South Africa, and the Gambia ===
Several states have argued that the ICC is a tool of Western imperialism, only punishing leaders from small, weak states while ignoring crimes committed by richer and more powerful states. This sentiment has been expressed particularly by African states, 34 of which are members of the ICC, due to a perceived disproportionate focus of the Court on Africa. Nine out of the ten situations which the ICC has investigated were in African countries.

In June 2009, several African states, including Comoros, Djibouti, and Senegal, called on African states parties to withdraw en masse from the statute in protest against the indictment of Sudanese President Omar al-Bashir. In September 2013, Kenya's National Assembly passed a motion to withdraw from the ICC in protest against the ICC prosecution of Kenyan Deputy President William Ruto and President Uhuru Kenyatta (both charged before coming into office). A mass withdrawal from the ICC by African member states in response to the trial of Kenyan authorities was discussed at a special summit of the African Union in October. The summit concluded that serving heads of state should not be put on trial, and that the Kenyan cases should be deferred. However, the summit did not endorse the proposal for a mass withdrawal due to lack of support for the idea. In November the ICC's Assembly of State Parties responded by agreeing to consider proposed amendments to the Rome Statute to address the AU's concerns.

In October–November 2016, Burundi, South Africa, and The Gambia all notified the UNSG of their intention to withdraw from the ICC. Burundi was the subject of an ongoing preliminary investigation by the ICC at the time. South Africa's exit followed its refusal to execute an ICC warrant for Sudan's al-Bashir when he was in the country. Following The Gambia's presidential election later that year, which ended the long rule of Yahya Jammeh, The Gambia rescinded its withdrawal notification. The constitutionality of South Africa's notice was challenged by the Democratic Alliance opposition party, which argued that the approval of parliament was required and not sought. The High Court of South Africa ruled in February 2017 that the government's notification was not legal, and it was required to revoke the notice effective 7 March 2017. A parliamentary bill on ICC withdrawal was subsequently withdrawn by the government. The governing African National Congress party continued to support withdrawing, and in 2019 a new bill was put before Parliament to withdraw from the Statute, though this was also withdrawn in March 2023. Following the issuance of ICC arrest warrants for Vladimir Putin and Maria Lvova-Belova of Russia in March 2023, due to the deportation of children from Ukraine to Russia during the Russian invasion of Ukraine, South African president Cyril Ramaphosa declared that his country had decided to withdraw from the treaty to allow Putin to visit their country without risk of arrest for the upcoming 2023 BRICS summit hosted in South Africa. However, it was subsequently clarified that such a decision had not been made.

=== Philippines ===
On 14 March 2018, Rodrigo Duterte, the Philippine president who was under preliminary examination by the ICC for his controversial war on drugs campaign, announced that the country would withdraw from the Rome Statute. He argued that while the Statute was ratified by the Senate of the Philippines in 2011, it was never published in the Official Gazette of the Philippines, a requirement for penal laws (of which the Rome Statute subscribes as such) to take effect. Hence, he claimed that the Philippines was never a State Party ab initio. Additionally, he stated that the ICC was being utilized as a political tool against weak targets such as the Philippines. The United Nations received the official notification of withdrawal on 17 March 2018; one year later (March 17, 2019), by rule, the Philippines' withdrawal became official. The legal validity of the withdrawal was challenged at the Supreme Court of the Philippines, which dismissed the case in 2021 in a unanimous decision for being "moot and academic". Nevertheless, the Supreme Court affirmed that the Philippines was obliged to cooperate with the ICC regarding acts committed while the Rome Statute was still in effect.

While Bongbong Marcos, Duterte's successor as President, initially stated that the country "has no intention of rejoining the ICC", in 2023 he stated that he was studying the possibility of rejoining. The Philippine government also confirmed that it would extradite Duterte to the ICC if the matter were transferred to Interpol. When an arrest warrant was issued in March 2025, Duterte was arrested by Philippine police and surrendered to the custody of the ICC shortly thereafter. In July 2025 the Secretary of Foreign Affairs stated that while no decision to rejoin the ICC had been made, the possibility was under discussion by relevant agencies. In February 2026, opposition parliamentarians introduced a resolution to calling for the government to rejoin the ICC. On 6 November 2025, the ICC issued a secret arrest warrant against Duterte's erstwhile police chief, now Senator Ronald dela Rosa, charging him with the crime against humanity of repeated murder during the period between 1 November 2011, and 16 March 2019. On 11 May 2026, the arrest warrant was made public, and dela Rosa was placed on the international wanted list. The Senate refused to authorize his arrest, and an attempt to capture him in the Senate building itself on 13 May resulted in the Senate lockdown and a shootout, during which dela Rosa fled. President Bongbong Marcos's spokeswoman, while stating that there are "no plans yet" underway for the country's return within the Court, had communicated the previous day that the president still intended to apply national and international laws and that parliamentary guarantees are subject to limits.

=== Islamic Emirate of Afghanistan ===
In February 2025, following the ICC prosecutor's request for arrest warrants against Supreme Leader Hibatullah Akhundzada and Chief Justice Abdul Hakim Haqqani, the Taliban government of Afghanistan—which is not recognized by the United Nations—stated that it did not view itself as bound to the Rome Statute, and declared that the country's accession in 2003 was "devoid of legal validity". However, the Taliban has not formally initiated its withdrawal from the Rome Statute.

=== Hungary ===
On 3 April 2025, Hungary announced that it would withdraw from the ICC, shortly after Benjamin Netanyahu, who is wanted by the court for alleged war crimes in Gaza, arrived to the country for an official visit. Prime Minister Viktor Orbán stated that the court's decision to prosecute Netanyahu showed it had become a "political court". On 20 May 2025, with 134 votes in favour, 37 against and 7 abstentions, the Hungarian National Assembly passed a bill approving withdrawal. According to article 127 of the Rome Statute, withdrawal would not discharge Hungary from its obligations under the Statute until it had officially become effective (1 year after its formal notification, i.e. on 2 June 2026). Following the 2026 Hungarian parliamentary election, newly elected Prime Minister Péter Magyar's government announced on 25 May 2026 that it would revoke the withdrawal. A bill to revoke withdrawal was passed by an overwhelming majority in the National Assembly on 27 May. President Tamás Sulyok and Parliamentary Speaker Ágnes Forsthoffer signed the bill into law the next day, and it officially took effect on 29 May. The proposed withdrawal, had it succeeded, would have made Hungary the only nation in the European Union not to recognise the ICC.

=== Alliance of Sahel States ===
In September 2025, Burkina Faso, Niger and Mali, who form the Alliance of Sahel States announced their plans to withdraw from the ICC, labeling it as an "instrument of neo-colonialist repression". The three leaders (Ibrahim Traoré, Abdourahamane Tiani and Assimi Goita) accused the ICC of targeting less privileged countries and stated that the ICC "has proven itself incapable of handling and prosecuting proven war crimes, crimes against humanity, crimes of genocide, and crimes of aggression". The three leaders further stated that they were in favor of creating "indigenous mechanisms for the consolidation of peace and justice" as an alternative. On 18 June 2026, nine months after the announcement, Niger submitted its instrument of withdrawal to the ICC, as did Burkina Faso and Mali on 24 June.

=== U.S. campaign for state withdrawals (2026–present) ===
In July 2026, the United States announced that it was launching a campaign to encourage ICC member states to withdraw, citing threats to American sovereignty.

In July 2026, Venezuelan foreign minister Félix Plasencia announced that Venezuela had informed the UN of its "irrevocable" decision to withdraw from the ICC under the orders of interim president Delcy Rodríguez, accusing the court of disproportionately focusing on African and Latin American nations in the Global South. The National Assembly of Venezuela had voted in December 2025 to revoke the law it had previously passed to ratify the Rome Statute. The United States praised Rodríguez for joining its campaign to dismantle the ICC. On 24 July 2026 the acting government of Venezuela formally notified the UN of its decision, with the withdrawal thus becoming effective on 24 July 2027, but Venezuela's exit will not affect the ongoing ICC investigation in the country.

On 27 July 2026, Chad announced its intention to withdraw from the ICC, citing limited effectiveness and disproportionate attention to African cases; it was directly asked to withdraw by the United States. According to the Chadian authorities, the instrument of withdrawal was duly notified to the Secretary-General of the United Nations on the same day; consequently, the withdrawal will become effective on 27 July 2027. On 7 August 2026, the Presidency of the Assembly of States Parties officially expressed its regret for the decisions taken by Chad and Venezuela.

In September 2026, Naoero (formerly known as Nauru) announced its intention to withdraw from the International Criminal Court. President David Adeang stated during his address to the United Nations General Assembly that the country would deposit its instruments of withdrawal from the Rome Statute, describing the ICC as a multilateral institution of “increasing irrelevance” to Naoero. The announcement followed a call by U.S. President Donald Trump earlier the same day for states to leave the court. In the same speech, Adeang also criticised the International Seabed Authority for prolonged delays in adopting a mining code for deep seabed mineral extraction, an issue of particular importance to Naoero as one of the strongest Pacific proponents of such activities.

=== Tajikistan ===
In September 2026, Tajikistan’s lower house of parliament considered a draft law providing for the country’s withdrawal from the International Criminal Court. The initiative followed the ICC's formal finding of non-compliance after Tajikistan hosted Russian President Vladimir Putin in October 2025 without executing the court’s outstanding arrest warrant against him, an action that had earlier drawn criticism from the European Union. Tajikistan, which ratified the Rome Statute in 2000 and became a state party in 2002, cited the obligations arising from membership as incompatible with its national interests and close partnership with Russia.

=== Uganda ===
On 20 November 2026, the Army Chief UgandaMuhoozi Kainerugaba, who was previously wanted by the ICC for alleged crimes against humanity, called for the withdrawal of the country from the ICC, making a post questioning why it was a part of the court in the first place. In another post he said that rebel leader of the Lord's Resistance Army Joseph Kony should face trial in Uganda instead of the Hague. He also voiced his support to the foreign minister Adonia Ayebare who also supported the idea of the country's' withdrawal of the ICC, but it was opposed by the justice minister. The country has yet to formally notify the UN.

== Acceptance of jurisdiction ==
Pursuant to article 12(3) of the Rome Statute of the International Criminal Court, a state that is not a party to the Statute may, "by declaration lodged with the Registrar, accept the exercise of jurisdiction by the Court with respect to the crime in question." Even if the state that does so is not a State Party to the Statute, the relevant provisions of the statute would still be applicable on the accepting state, but only on an ad hoc basis.

To date, the Court has received seven article 12(3) declarations. Additionally, a declaration was submitted in December 2013 by the Freedom and Justice Party of Egypt seeking to accept jurisdiction on behalf of Egypt. However, the Office of the Prosecutor found that as the party had lost power following the 2013 Egyptian coup d'état that July, it did not have the authority to make the declaration on behalf of Egypt.

State	Date of acceptance	Start of jurisdiction	End of jurisdiction	Date of membership
Côte d'Ivoire	18 April 2003	19 September 2002	Indefinite	1 May 2013
Palestine*	21 January 2009	1 July 2002	Indefinite	1 April 2015
Ukraine	9 April 2014	21 November 2013	22 February 2014	1 January 2025
Palestine	31 December 2014	13 June 2014	Indefinite	1 April 2015
Ukraine	8 September 2015	20 February 2014	Indefinite	1 January 2025
Armenia	15 November 2023	10 May 2021	Indefinite	1 February 2024
Libya (Note: On 12 May 2025, Libya submitted a declaration acceptance of the Court's jurisdiction with respect to alleged crimes committed in its territory from 2011 to the end of 2027.)	12 May 2025	1 January 2011	31 December 2027	—

*	= Declaration was deemed invalid by the Office of the Prosecutor.

== Signatories which have not ratified ==
Of the 139 states that had signed the Rome Statute, 29 have not ratified. Of these, 4 have formally indicated that they no longer plan to ratify the treaty.

State	Signature
Algeria	28 December 2000
Angola	7 October 1998
Bahamas, The	29 December 2000
Bahrain	11 December 2000
Cameroon	17 July 1998
Egypt	26 December 2000
Eritrea	7 October 1998
Guinea-Bissau	12 September 2000
Haiti	26 February 1999
Iran	31 December 2000
Israel* (Note: Signature withdrawn on 28 August 2002.)	31 December 2000
Jamaica	8 September 2000
Kuwait	8 September 2000
Kyrgyzstan	8 December 1998
Monaco	18 July 1998
Morocco	8 September 2000
Mozambique	28 December 2000
Oman	20 December 2000
Russia* (Note: Signature withdrawn on 30 November 2016.)	13 September 2000
São Tomé and Príncipe	28 December 2000
Solomon Islands	3 December 1998
Sudan* (Note: Signature withdrawn on 26 August 2008.)	8 September 2000
Syria	29 November 2000
Thailand	2 October 2000
United Arab Emirates	27 November 2000
United States* (Note: Signature withdrawn on 6 May 2002.)	31 December 2000
Uzbekistan	29 December 2000
Yemen	28 December 2000
Zimbabwe	17 July 1998

*	= States which have declared that they no longer intend to ratify the treaty

According to the Vienna Convention on the Law of Treaties, a state that has signed but not ratified a treaty is obliged to refrain from "acts which would defeat the object and purpose" of the treaty. However, these obligations do not continue if the state has "made its intention clear not to become a party to the treaty". Four signatory states (Israel, the Russian Federation, Sudan, and the United States) have informed the UN Secretary General that they no longer intend to become parties to the Rome Statute, and as such have no legal obligations arising from their signature.

=== Bahrain ===
The government of Bahrain originally announced in May 2006 that it would ratify the Rome Statute in the session ending in July 2006. By December 2006, the ratification had not yet been completed, but the Coalition for the International Criminal Court said they expected ratification in 2007.

=== Israel ===
Israel voted against the adoption of the Rome Statute but later signed it for a short period. In 2002, Israel notified the UN Secretary General that it no longer intended to become a party to the Rome Statute, and as such, it has no legal obligations arising from their signature of the statute.

Israel states that it has "deep sympathy" with the goals of the Court. However, it has concerns that political pressure on the Court would lead it to reinterpret international law or to "invent new crimes". It cites the inclusion of "the transfer of parts of the civilian population of an occupying power into occupied territory" as a war crime as an example of this, whilst at the same time disagrees with the exclusion of terrorism and drug trafficking. Israel sees the powers given to the prosecutor as excessive and the geographical appointment of judges as disadvantaging Israel which was prevented from joining any of the UN Regional Groups.

=== Kuwait ===
At a conference in 2007, the Kuwaiti Bar Association and the Secretary of the National Assembly of Kuwait, Hussein Al-Hereti, called for Kuwait to join the Court.

=== Russia ===
Russia signed the Rome Statute in 2000. On 14 November 2016 the ICC published a report on its preliminary investigation of the Russo-Ukrainian War which found that "the situation within the territory of Crimea and Sevastopol factually amounts to an on-going state of occupation" and that "information, such as reported shelling by both States of military positions of the other, and the detention of Russian military personnel by Ukraine, and vice versa, points to direct military engagement between Russian armed forces and Ukrainian government forces that would suggest the existence of an international armed conflict in the context of armed hostilities in eastern Ukraine". In response, a presidential decree by Russian President Vladimir Putin approved "sending the Secretary General of the United Nations notice of the intention of the Russian Federation to no longer be a party to the Rome Statute". Formal notice was given on 30 November 2016.

=== Sudan ===
Sudan signed the Rome Statute in 2000. In 2005 the ICC opened an investigation into the war in Darfur, a region of Sudan. Omar al-Bashir, the President of Sudan, was indicted in 2009. On 26 August 2008, Sudan notified the UN Secretary General that it no longer intended to ratify the treaty and therefore no longer bears any legal obligations arising from its signature. Following the 2019 Sudanese coup d'état, Sadiq al-Mahdi a former prime minister of Sudan who backs the opposition, called for Sudan to join the ICC.

On 4 August 2021, the Sudanese government approved unanimously a draft bill to join the Rome Statute of the International Criminal Court.

=== Thailand ===
Former Senator Kraisak Choonhavan called in November 2006 for Thailand to ratify the Rome Statute and to accept retrospective jurisdiction, so that former premier Thaksin Shinawatra could be investigated for crimes against humanity connected to 2,500 alleged extrajudicial killings carried out in 2003 against suspected drug dealers.

=== United States ===
The United States signed the Rome Statute in December 2000 (under President Bill Clinton), but Clinton decided not to submit the treaty to the United States Senate for ratification, stating: "I will not, and do not recommend that my successor [George W. Bush] submit the treaty to the Senate for advice and consent until our fundamental concerns are satisfied." Opponents of the ICC in the U.S. Senate are "skeptical of new international institutions and still jealously protective of American sovereignty"; before the Rome Statute, opposition to the ICC was largely headed by Republican Senator Jesse Helms. On May 6, 2002, the Bush administration stated that the U.S. did not intend to become a state party to the ICC; in a letter to Secretary-General of the United Nations Kofi Annan, Under Secretary of State for Arms Control and International Security John Bolton stated that "the United States does not intend to become a party to the treaty," and that "the United States has no legal obligations arising from its signature on December 31, 2000." This letter is sometimes called the "unsigning" of the treaty, but legal opinions on its actual legal effects differ, with some scholars arguing that the president does not have the power to unilaterally "unsign" treaties.

The United States "adopted a hostile stance towards the Court throughout most of the Bush presidency." In 2002, Congress enacted the American Servicemembers' Protection Act (ASPA), which was signed into law on August 2, 2002; the "overriding purpose of the ASPA was to inhibit the U.S. government from supporting the ICC." Major provisions of the ASPA blocked U.S. funding of the ICC and required the U.S. "to enter into agreements with all ICC signatory states to shield American citizens abroad from ICC jurisdiction, under the auspices of Article 98 of the Rome Statute," which bars the ICC "from prosecuting individuals located on the territory of an ICC member state, where such action by the Court would cause the member state to violate the terms of any other bilateral or multilateral treaty to which it is a party." Traditionally, Article 98 was used in relation to traditional status of forces agreements (SOFAs) and status of mission agreements (SOMAs), in which nations hosting U.S. military personnel by invitation agreed to immunize them from prosecution in foreign courts. The Bush administration, supported by opponents of the ICC in Congress, adopted a new strategy of aggressively pursuing Bilateral Immunity Agreements (BIAs), "which guarantee immunity from ICC prosecution for all American citizens in the country with which the agreement is concluded" rather than just U.S. military forces. "Under the original ASPA, nations who refused to conclude BIAs with the United States were subject to sanctions, including the loss of military aid (though these provisions have since been repealed)." As of December 2006, the U.S. State Department reported that it had signed 102 BIAs. In 2002, the United States threatened to veto the renewal of all United Nations peacekeeping missions unless its troops were granted immunity from prosecution by the Court. In a compromise move, the Security Council passed Resolution 1422 on 12 July 2002, granting immunity to personnel from ICC non-states parties involved in United Nations established or authorized missions for a renewable twelve-month period. This was renewed for twelve months in 2003 but the Security Council refused to renew the exemption again in 2004, after pictures emerged of US troops abusing Iraqi prisoners in Abu Ghraib, and the US withdrew its demand.

Under the Obama administration, the U.S. did not take moves to ratify the Rome Statute, but did adopt a "cautious, case-by-case approach to supporting the ICC" by supporting cases before the ICC. Secretary of State Hillary Clinton stated that the U.S. encouraged "effective ICC action in ways that promote U.S. interests by bringing war criminals to justice." U.S. steps in support of the ICC undertaken under the Obama administration included participating in the annual Assembly of States Parties as an observer; using the U.S.'s permanent seat on the UN Security Council to support the referral of cases to the ICC (including Libya in 2011); "sharing intelligence on fugitives and providing other substantial in-kind support" to the ICC; and expanding the War Crimes Rewards Program."

The first Trump administration strained relations with the ICC, stating it would revoke visas for any ICC staff seeking to investigate Americans for war crimes. Secretary of State Mike Pompeo stated that such revocations could be applied to any staff involved with investigating war crimes committed by Israel or other allied nations as well.

=== Yemen ===
On 24 March 2007, the Yemeni parliament voted to ratify the Rome Statute. However, some MPs claim that this vote breached parliamentary rules, and demanded another vote. In that further vote, the ratification was retracted.

== Non-party, non-signatory states ==
The deadline for signing the Rome Statute expired following 31 December 2000. States that did not sign before that date have to accede to the Statute in a single step.

Of all the states that are members of the United Nations, observers in the United Nations General Assembly, or otherwise recognized by the Secretary-General of the United Nations as states with full treaty-making capacities, there are 41 which have neither signed nor acceded to the Statute:

- Azerbaijan
- Belarus
- Bhutan
- Brunei
- China
- Cuba
- Equatorial Guinea
- Eswatini
- Ethiopia
- India
- Indonesia
- Iraq
- Kazakhstan
- Korea, North
- Laos
- Lebanon
- Libya
- Malaysia (Note: Malaysia submitted an instrument of accession to the Rome Statute on 4 March 2019, which was to enter into force on 1 June. However, on 29 April 2019 Malaysia submitted a notice withdrawing its instrument of accession effective immediately, preventing it from acceding. For more details see § Malaysia.)
- Mauritania
- Micronesia
- Myanmar
- Nepal
- Nicaragua
- Niue
- Pakistan
- Palau
- Papua New Guinea
- Qatar
- Rwanda
- Saudi Arabia
- Singapore
- Somalia
- South Sudan
- Sri Lanka
- Togo
- Tonga
- Turkey
- Turkmenistan
- Tuvalu
- Vatican City
- Vietnam

Additionally, in accordance with practice and declarations filed with the Secretary-General, the Rome Statute is not in force in the following dependent territories:

- British Indian Ocean Territory – an overseas territory of the United Kingdom
- Guernsey – a Crown dependency of the United Kingdom
- Jersey – a Crown dependency of the United Kingdom
- Tokelau – a territory of New Zealand

=== China ===
The People's Republic of China has opposed the Court, on the basis that it goes against the sovereignty of nation states, that the principle of complementarity gives the Court the ability to judge a nation's court system, that war crimes jurisdiction covers internal as well as international conflicts, that the Court's jurisdiction covers peacetime crimes against humanity, that the inclusion of the crime of aggression weakens the role of the UN Security Council, and that the Prosecutor's right to initiate prosecutions may open the Court to political influence.

=== India ===
The government of India has consistently opposed the Court. It abstained in the vote adopting the statute in 1998, saying it objected to the broad definition adopted of crimes against humanity; the rights given to the UN Security Council to refer and delay investigations and bind non-states parties; and the use of nuclear weapons and other weapons of mass destruction not being explicitly criminalized. Other anxieties about the Court concern how the principle of complementarity would be applied to the Indian criminal justice system, the inclusion of war crimes for non-international conflicts, and the power of the Prosecutor to initiate prosecutions.

=== Indonesia ===
In October 1999, the Indonesian representative at the United Nations General Assembly Sixth Committee stated that Indonesia supports the adoption of the Rome Statute, and that "universal participation should be the cornerstone of the International Criminal Court". The Indonesian 2004 National Plan of Action on Human Rights (Rencana Aksi Nasional Hak Asasi Manusia, RANHAM) stated Indonesia's intention to ratify the statute in 2008. This was repeated in 2007 by Foreign Minister Hassan Wirajuda and the head of the Indonesian People's Representative Council's Committee on Security and International Affairs, Theo L. Sambuaga. In May 2013, Defense Minister Purnomo Yusgiantoro stated that the government needed "more time to carefully and thoroughly review the pros and cons of the ratification".

=== Iraq ===
In February 2005, the Iraqi Transitional Government decided to ratify the Rome Statute. However, two weeks later it reversed this decision, a move that the Coalition for the International Criminal Court claimed was due to pressure from the United States.

=== Lebanon ===
In March 2009, Lebanese Justice Minister said the government had decided not to join for now. The Coalition for the International Criminal Court claimed this was due in part to "intense pressure" from the United States, who feared it could result in the prosecution of Israelis in a future conflict. Following the outbreak of the Gaza war which triggered clashes between Israel and the Lebanese armed group Hezbollah, in April 2024 Lebanon's cabinet decided to submit a declaration to the ICC accepting the court's jurisdiction over crimes committed on Lebanese territory since 7 October 2023. However, the following month this decision was reversed, and the declaration was not submitted.

=== Libya ===
On 12 May 2025, the UN recognized Libyan government (Government of National Unity) submitted a declaration acceptance of the court's jurisdiction with respect to alleged crimes committed in its territory from 2011 to the end of 2027.

=== Malaysia ===
Malaysia submitted an instrument of accession to the Rome Statute on 4 March 2019, which was to enter into force on 1 June. However, on 29 April 2019, Malaysia submitted a notice withdrawing its instrument of accession effective immediately to the Secretary General of the United Nations, preventing it from acceding. Prime Minister Mahathir Mohamad explained that the withdrawal was due to concerns over its constitutionality as well as possible infringement of the sovereignty of the Malay Rulers.

=== Nepal ===
On 25 July 2006, the Nepalese House of Representatives directed the government to ratify the Rome Statute. Under Nepalese law, this motion is compulsory for the Executive.

Following a resolution by Parliament requesting that the government ratify the Statute, Narahari Acharya, Ministry of Law, Justice, Constituent Assembly and Parliamentary Affairs of Nepal, said in March 2015 that it had "formed a taskforce to conduct a study about the process". However, he said that it was "possible only after promulgating the new constitution", which was being debated by the 2nd Nepalese Constituent Assembly.

=== Pakistan ===
Pakistan has supported the aims of the International Court and voted for the Rome Statute in 1998. However, Pakistan has not signed the agreement on the basis of several objections, including the fact that the Statute does not provide for reservations upon ratification or accession, the inclusion of provisional arrest, and the lack of immunity for heads of state. In addition, Pakistan (one of the largest suppliers of UN peacekeepers) has, like the United States, expressed reservations about the potential use of politically motivated charges against peacekeepers.

=== South Sudan ===
South Sudan's president Salva Kiir said in 2013 that the country would not join the ICC.

=== Turkey ===
Turkey is currently a candidate country to join the European Union, which has required progress on human rights issues in order to continue with accession talks. Part of this has included pressure, but not a requirement, on Turkey to join the Court which is supported under the EU's Common Foreign and Security Policy. Turkish prime minister Recep Tayyip Erdoğan stated in October 2004 that Turkey would "soon" ratify the Rome Statute, and the Turkish constitution was amended in 2004 to explicitly allow nationals to be surrendered to the Court. However, in January 2008, the Erdoğan government reversed its position, deciding to shelve accession because of concerns it could undermine efforts against the Kurdistan Workers Party (PKK).

== See also ==
- List of presidents and vice-presidents of the Assembly of States Parties of the International Criminal Court
- European Union and the International Criminal Court
- Armenia and the International Criminal Court
