= Convention establishing an International Claims Commission for Ukraine =

2025 Council of Europe treaty

Ukraine Claims Commission Convention
Convention establishing an International Claims Commission for Ukraine
- Signatories to the International Claims Commission for Ukraine Signatories Signatories also covered by the EU signature Non-signatories covered by the EU signature CoE member states which have not signed the convention
- Type: Multilateral treaty
- Signed: 16 December 2025
- Location: The Hague, Netherlands
- Condition: Upon ratification by a 25 signatories and fulfilment of financial requirements
- Signatories: 40 states and the European Union
- Parties: 9 states and the European Union
- Depositary: Secretary General of the Council of Europe
- Languages: English and French

The Convention establishing an International Claims Commission for Ukraine is a multilateral international treaty developed under the auspices of the Council of Europe and open for signature on 16 December 2025 in The Hague, Netherlands. Nine states and the European Union have ratified the Convention, whilst thirty-one states have signed it but have not yet ratified it.

The Convention establishes the International Claims Commission for Ukraine, an independent body tasked with reviewing, assessing and deciding upon compensation claims for damage, loss and injury caused by the Russian invasion of Ukraine since 24 February 2022. Member states of the Council of Europe, certain non-member states, and the European Union can become a party to the Convention, which will enter into force after 25 ratifications and sufficient financial commitments are secured.

This Commission will take over the responsibility for the Register of Damage Caused by the Aggression of the Russian Federation against Ukraine, which was also established by the Council of Europe.

== See also ==
- Special Tribunal for the Crime of Aggression against Ukraine
