= Kateryna Rashevska =

Ukrainian human rights activist (born 1997)

- Катерина Рашевська
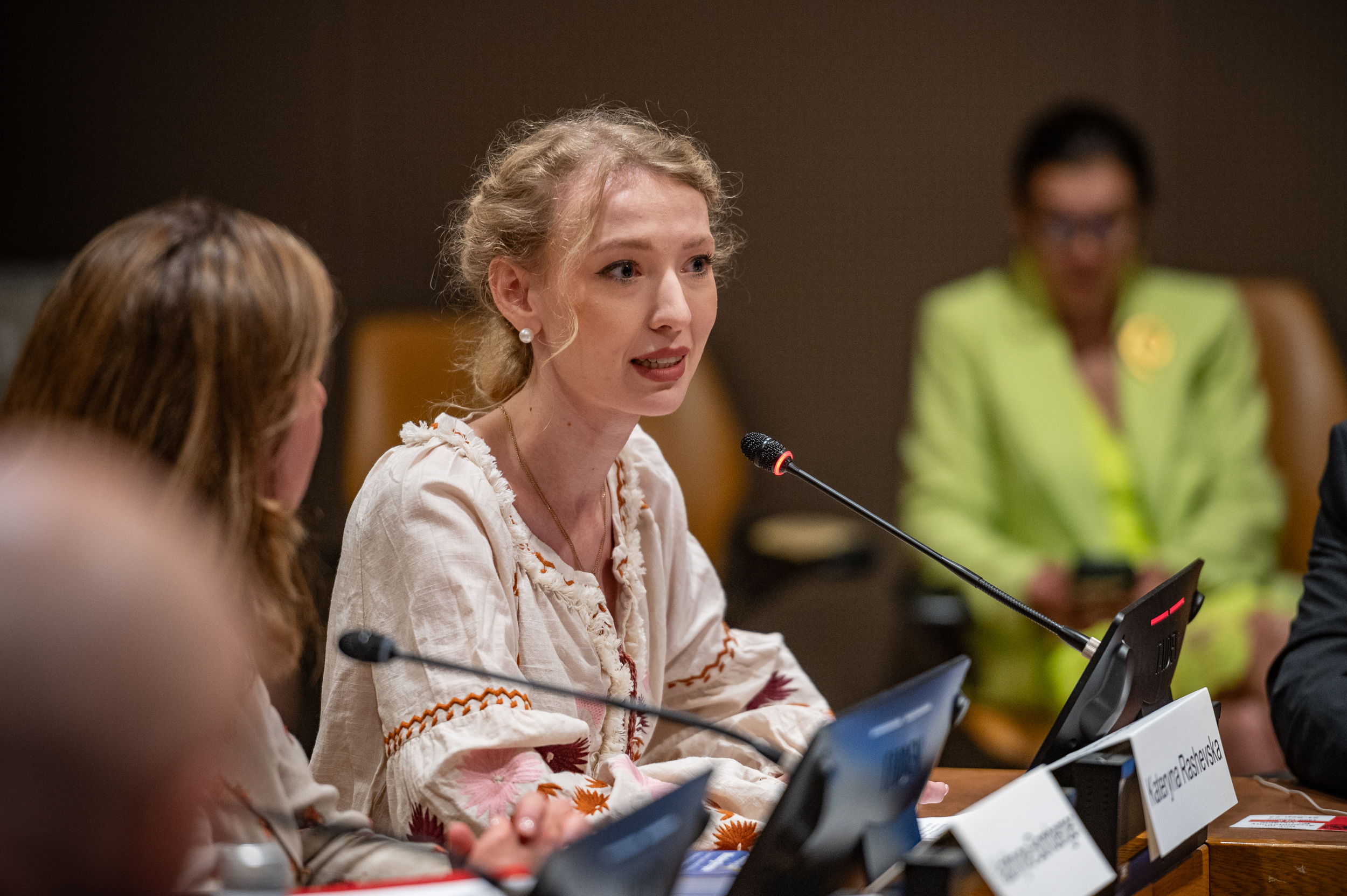
- Speaking at the UN General Assembly in 2023
- Born: 1997 (age 28–29); Poltava Oblast, Ukraine
- Education: Taras Shevchenko National University of Kyiv
- Occupations: Lawyer; Human rights activist
- Employer: Regional Centre for Human Rights

Kateryna Rashevska (Ukrainian: Катерина Рашевська; c. 1997) is a Ukrainian human rights activist. As a legal expert for the Regional Centre for Human Rights, she has advocated for the return of children abducted during the Russo-Ukrainian war.

== Early life and education ==
Rashevska was born and raised in Poltava Oblast. She trained as a lawyer at university, and subsequently obtained a PhD in international law from Taras Shevchenko National University of Kyiv. As of 2025, Rashevska lives in Kyiv.

== Activism ==
Rashevska is the lead for international justice at the Regional Centre for Human Rights, a non-governmental organisation reporting on human rights abuses in Ukraine. Following the outbreak of the Russo-Ukrainian war in 2014, she started a project documenting the deportation of Ukrainian soldiers from Crimea to Russia. Rashevska has worked as an identified expert for the Interdepartmental Commission on the Application and Implementation of International Humanitarian Law in Ukraine and the Expert Council at the Representation of the President of Ukraine in the Autonomous Republic of Crimea. She has also written a regular legal column for 24 Kanal.

In 2022, following the Russian invasion of Ukraine, Rashevska initially left Kyiv for Vienna, Austria, before returning to Ukraine shortly afterwards. She identified a pattern of children being "evacuated" from occupied areas of Ukraine by Russian authorities, and reported on the subsequent indoctrination, Russification and militarisation - and, at times, forced adoption - of Ukrainian children in Russia and Russian allies, including Belarus and North Korea. Rashevska has criticised the Russian use of the term "evacuation", stating that Russian authorities have not adhered to international humanitarian law concerning evacuation due to not providing lists of evacuated children; completing regular assessments on the justification for ongoing evacuation; and for not working to return children safely to Ukraine. Rashevska instead proposed the term "abduction" be used, and accused Russia of breaching multiple articles of the Convention on the Rights of the Child. In response to ongoing abductions, Rashevka joined Bring Back Kids UA Task Force, a national expert council. She has called for the development of a universal mechanism for the return of displaced children.

Rashevska has addressed the United Nations Security Council and the United States Senate on the issue of child abductions. She co-wrote four submissions to the International Criminal Court, which led to arrest warrants being issued for the President of Russia, Vladimir Putin; the Children's Commissioner, Maria Lvova-Belova; and the President of Belarus, Alexander Lukashenko; for the "unlawful deportation" of Ukrainian children into Russia. Rashevska has called on the international community to hold Russian accountable and to enforce the safe return of Ukrainian children; she has criticised countries that have permitted Putin to visit them without honouring the arrest warrant made by the ICC, including Mongolia and Tajikistan.

== Recognition ==
Victoria Amelina featured Rashevksa as one of thirteen women in her book Looking at Women Looking at War, which went on to win the Orwell Prize. Rashevska described Amelina as her role model.

In 2025, Rashevska was named as one of Forbes Ukraine's 30 Under 30, as a harbinger of change.
