= Amendments to the Rome Statute =

Amendments to the Rome Statute of the International Criminal Court must be proposed, adopted, and ratified in accordance with articles 121 and 122 of the Statute. Any state party to the Statute can propose an amendment. The proposed amendment can be adopted by a two-thirds majority vote in either a meeting of the Assembly of States Parties or a review conference called by the Assembly. An amendment comes into force for all states parties one year after it is ratified by seven-eighths of the states parties. However, any amendment to articles 5, 6, 7, or 8 of the Statute only enters into force for states parties that have ratified the amendment. A state party which ratifies an amendment to articles 5, 6, 7, or 8 is subject to that amendment one year after ratifying it, regardless of how many other states parties have also ratified it. For an article 5, 6, 7, or 8 amendment, the Statute itself is amended after the amendment comes into force for the first state party to ratify it. Amendments of a purely institutional nature enter into force six months after they are approved by a two-thirds majority vote in either a meeting of the Assembly of States Parties or a review conference.

== Summary of adopted amendments to the Rome Statute ==
In June 2010, two sets of amendments to the Rome Statute of the International Criminal Court were adopted by the Review Conference in Kampala, Uganda. The first amendment criminalizes the use of certain kinds of weapons in non-international conflicts whose use was already forbidden in international conflicts. The second set of amendments defines the crime of aggression. It entered into force in May 2013, but its activation was tied to two conditions, which were met in July 2018. In November 2015, an additional amendment to remove article 124 from the Statute was adopted during the 14th meeting of the Assembly of States Parties in The Hague in the Netherlands. In December 2017, three amendments to article 8 were adopted at the 12th meeting of the Assembly of States Parties in New York City. In December 2019, one additional amendment to article 8 was adopted by the Assembly of States Parties in The Hague.

Title	Adopted at	Adopted on	Ratified by	Entry into force	In force for (Note: An amendment to articles 5, 6, 7, or 8 of the Statute only enters into force for states parties that have ratified the amendment.)	Ref.
Amendment to article 8	Kampala	10 June 2010	50	26 September 2012	49	
Amendments on the crime of aggression	Kampala	10 June 2010	49	8 May 2013	49	
Amendment to article 124	The Hague	26 November 2015	29	—	0	
Amendment to article 8 (Weapons which use microbial or other biological agents, or toxins)	New York	14 December 2017	29	2 April 2020	27	
Amendment to article 8 (Weapons the primary effect of which is to injure by fragments undetectable by x-rays in the human body)	New York	14 December 2017	27	2 April 2020	25	
Amendment to article 8 (Blinding laser weapons)	New York	14 December 2017	27	2 April 2020	25	
Amendment to article 8 (Intentionally using starvation of civilians)	The Hague	6 December 2019	25	14 October 2021	23	

== Amendment to article 8 (2010) ==
=== Summary ===
An amendment to article 8 was adopted on 10 June 2010 at the Review Conference of the Rome Statute in Kampala, Uganda. The amendment had originally been proposed by Belgium and it was forwarded to the Review Conference by the eighth session of the Assembly of States Parties.

The amendment adds to article 8(2)(e) three clauses which make it a war crime to employ poison, "asphyxiating, poisonous or other gases, and all analogous liquids, materials or devices," or expanding bullets in an armed conflict not of an international character. The Rome Statute already makes the use of such means of warfare a war crime in international armed conflicts.

=== States parties to the amendment ===
Because the amendment is to article 8, it will come into force only for those states parties which have ratified it, one year after doing so. As of September 2026, 50 states parties have ratified the amendment. The Rome Statute itself was amended on 26 September 2012 after the amendment came into force for the first state party to ratify it.

State	Ratified	Entry into force
Andorra	26 September 2013	26 September 2014
Argentina	28 April 2017	28 April 2018
Austria	17 July 2014	17 July 2015
Belgium	26 November 2013	26 November 2014
Botswana	4 June 2013	4 June 2014
Chile	23 September 2016	23 September 2017
Costa Rica	5 February 2015	5 February 2016
Croatia	20 December 2013	20 December 2014
Cyprus	25 September 2013	25 September 2014
Czech Republic	12 March 2015	12 March 2016
Denmark (Note: The amendment to article 8 (2010) has not been extended to the Faroe Islands or Greenland.)	1 January 2025	1 January 2026
El Salvador	3 March 2016	3 March 2017
Estonia	27 March 2013	27 March 2014
Finland	30 December 2015	30 December 2016
Georgia	3 November 2015	3 November 2016
Germany	3 June 2013	3 June 2014
Guyana	28 September 2018	28 September 2019
Ireland	23 September 2026	23 September 2027
Italy	26 January 2022	26 January 2023
Latvia	25 September 2014	25 September 2015
Liechtenstein	8 May 2012	8 May 2013
Lithuania	7 December 2015	7 December 2016
Luxembourg	15 January 2013	15 January 2014
Malta	30 January 2015	30 January 2016
Mauritius	5 September 2013	5 September 2014
Mexico	20 January 2023	20 January 2024
Mongolia	18 January 2021	18 January 2022
Netherlands (Note: The amendment to article 8 (2010) entered into force for Aruba on 21 December 2017; it has not been extended to Curaçao or Sint Maarten.)	23 September 2016	23 September 2017
New Zealand	14 October 2020	14 October 2021
North Macedonia	1 March 2016	1 March 2017
Norway	10 June 2013	10 June 2014
Panama	6 December 2017	6 December 2018
Palestine	29 December 2017	29 December 2018
Paraguay	5 April 2019	5 April 2020
Peru	14 October 2022	14 October 2023
Poland	25 September 2014	25 September 2015
Portugal	11 April 2017	11 April 2018
Romania	14 February 2022	14 February 2023
Samoa	25 September 2012	25 September 2013
San Marino	26 September 2011	26 September 2012
Seychelles	1 July 2025	1 July 2026
Slovakia	28 April 2014	28 April 2015
Slovenia	25 September 2013	25 September 2014
Spain	25 September 2014	25 September 2015
Sweden	26 January 2022	26 January 2023
Switzerland	10 September 2015	10 September 2016
Timor-Leste	30 May 2025	30 May 2026
Trinidad and Tobago	13 November 2012	13 November 2013
Ukraine	25 October 2024	25 October 2025
Uruguay	26 September 2013	26 September 2014

== Amendments on the crime of aggression (2010) ==
=== Summary ===
Amendments on the crime of aggression were adopted on 11 June 2010 at the Review Conference of the Rome Statute in Kampala, Uganda. The amendments were proposed by Liechtenstein, which chaired the Special Working Group on the Crime of Aggression, the committee directed by the Assembly of States Parties to form a definition for the crime of aggression, which was originally absent from the Statute.

The amendments define the crime of aggression in accordance with United Nations General Assembly Resolution 3314. Acts of aggression are: invading another state; bombing another state; blockading the ports or coastlines of another state; attacking the land, sea, or air forces, or marine or sea fleets of another state; violating a status of forces agreement; using armed bands, groups, irregulars or mercenaries against another state; allowing territory to be used by another state to perpetrate an act of aggression against a third state.

The amendments inserted a new article 8 bis after article 8. The resolution adopting them clarified that their entry into force is governed by article 121, paragraph 5, which applies to amendments to articles 5 to 8. While the amendments thus come into force for each ratifying state one year after ratification, the amended text says that only crimes of aggression committed one year or more after the thirtieth ratification are within the jurisdiction of the Court. Furthermore, a decision had to be taken by the Assembly of States Parties with a two-thirds majority vote after 1 January 2017 to actually activate jurisdiction. On 26 June 2016, the State of Palestine became the 30th state party to ratify the amendments, thus ensuring that the first condition would be fulfilled. On 14 December 2017, the Assembly of States Parties adopted a resolution fulfilling the second condition, activating the Court's jurisdiction over the crime of aggression as of 17 July 2018.

While upon a United Nations Security Council referral the Prosecutor can open an investigation against the national of any state, this is not the case with state referral and proprio motu investigations by the Prosecutor. A state party can opt out of these amendments, and nationals of non-states parties are not subject to the Court's jurisdiction. Additionally, the Prosecutor must wait for a determination of the Security Council regarding an act of aggression. If the Security Council determines an act of aggression has taken place, the Prosecutor may proceed. If the Security Council does not act within six months, the Prosecutor can proceed provided that a Pre-Trial Chamber approves that move. The Security Council keeps its right to defer investigations for a period of one year.

=== States parties to the amendments ===
As of July 2026, 49 states parties have ratified the amendments. The Rome Statute itself was amended on 8 May 2013 after the amendments came into force for the first state party to ratify them. The Court gained jurisdiction over the crime of aggression on 17 July 2018.

State	Ratified	Entry into force
Andorra	26 September 2013	26 September 2014
Argentina	28 April 2017	28 April 2018
Austria	17 July 2014	17 July 2015
Belgium	26 November 2013	26 November 2014
Bolivia	10 December 2020	10 December 2021
Botswana	4 June 2013	4 June 2014
Chile	23 September 2016	23 September 2017
Costa Rica	5 February 2015	5 February 2016
Croatia	20 December 2013	20 December 2014
Cyprus	25 September 2013	25 September 2014
Czech Republic	12 March 2015	12 March 2016
Denmark (Note: The amendments on the crime of aggression (2010) have not been extended to the Faroe Islands or Greenland.)	1 January 2025	1 January 2026
Ecuador	25 September 2019	25 September 2020
El Salvador	3 March 2016	3 March 2017
Estonia	27 March 2013	27 March 2014
Finland	30 December 2015	30 December 2016
Georgia	5 December 2014	5 December 2015
Germany	3 June 2013	3 June 2014
Guyana	28 September 2018	28 September 2019
Iceland	17 June 2016	17 June 2017
Italy	26 January 2022	26 January 2023
Ireland	27 September 2018	27 September 2019
Latvia	25 September 2014	25 September 2015
Liechtenstein	8 May 2012	8 May 2013
Lithuania	7 December 2015	7 December 2016
Luxembourg	15 January 2013	15 January 2014
Malta	30 January 2015	30 January 2016
Mongolia	18 January 2021	18 January 2022
Netherlands (Note: The amendments on the crime of aggression (2010) entered into force for Aruba on 21 December 2017; they have not been extended to Curaçao or Sint Maarten.)	23 September 2016	23 September 2017
Niger	14 April 2023	14 April 2024
North Macedonia	1 March 2016	1 March 2017
Palestine	26 June 2016	26 June 2017
Paraguay	5 April 2019	5 April 2020
Panama	6 December 2017	6 December 2018
Peru	14 October 2022	14 October 2023
Poland	25 September 2014	25 September 2015
Portugal	11 April 2017	11 April 2018
Samoa	25 September 2012	25 September 2013
San Marino	14 November 2014	14 November 2015
Seychelles	1 July 2025	1 July 2026
Slovakia	28 April 2014	28 April 2015
Slovenia	25 September 2013	25 September 2014
Spain	25 September 2014	25 September 2015
Sweden	26 January 2022	26 January 2023
Switzerland	10 September 2015	10 September 2016
Timor-Leste	30 May 2025	30 May 2026
Trinidad and Tobago	13 November 2012	13 November 2013
Ukraine	25 October 2024	25 October 2025
Uruguay	26 September 2013	26 September 2014

== Amendment to article 124 (2015) ==
On 26 November 2015 during their 14th meeting, the Assembly of States Parties adopted the amendment to article 124 in The Hague in the Netherlands. The amendment deletes article 124 from the Rome Statute. Article 124 is a transitional provision, which allows a state, upon becoming party to the Statute, to declare that it does not accept the jurisdiction of the Court over war crimes committed in its territory or by its nationals for a period of seven years.

=== States parties to the amendment ===
As of September 2026, 29 states parties have ratified the amendment. Per article 121(4) of the Rome Statute, this amendment will enter into force for all states parties to the Rome Statute one year after seven-eighths of states parties (currently 110 states parties) have ratified it.

State	Ratified	Entry into force
Andorra	3 November 2020	TBD
Austria	22 September 2017	TBD
Belgium	16 May 2019	TBD
Croatia	27 April 2018	TBD
Cyprus	23 July 2024	TBD
Denmark (Note: The amendment to article 124 (2015) has not been extended to the Faroe Islands or Greenland.)	1 January 2025	TBD
Estonia	15 April 2024	TBD
France	19 March 2018	TBD
Finland	23 September 2016	TBD
Germany	21 September 2023	TBD
Ireland	23 September 2026	TBD
Italy	13 April 2018	TBD
Latvia	24 April 2020	TBD
Liechtenstein	21 January 2022	TBD
Lithuania	25 June 2024	TBD
Netherlands (Note: The Netherlands' acceptance of the amendment to article 124 (2015) has not been extended to Aruba or Sint Maarten.)	20 March 2017	TBD
Norway	1 July 2016	TBD
Poland	8 July 2026	TBD
Portugal	11 April 2017	TBD
Romania	14 June 2018	TBD
San Marino	25 September 2025	TBD
Seychelles	1 July 2025	TBD
Slovakia	28 October 2016	TBD
Slovenia	2 April 2019	TBD
Spain	21 March 2022	TBD
Sweden	26 January 2022	TBD
Switzerland	14 December 2018	TBD
Timor-Leste	30 May 2025	TBD
Uruguay	21 March 2023	TBD

== Amendment to article 8 (biological weapons) (2017) ==
On 14 December 2017, during their 16th meeting the Assembly of States Parties adopted the amendment to article 8. The amendment inserted an article defining the use of weapons which use microbial or other biological agents, or toxins as a war crime.

=== States parties to the amendment ===
Because the amendment is to article 8, it will come into force only for those states parties which have ratified it, one year after doing so. As of September 2026, 29 states parties have ratified the amendment. The Rome Statute itself was amended on 2 April 2020 after the amendment came into force for the first state party to ratify it.

State	Ratified	Entry into force
Andorra	23 September 2025	23 September 2026
Belgium	21 June 2024	21 June 2025
Chile	21 September 2023	21 September 2024
Croatia	17 May 2021	17 May 2022
Cyprus	23 July 2024	23 July 2025
Czech Republic	10 July 2020	10 July 2021
Denmark (Note: The amendment to article 8 (biological weapons) (2017) has not been extended to the Faroe Islands or Greenland.)	1 January 2025	1 January 2026
Estonia	15 April 2024	15 April 2025
Germany	21 September 2023	21 September 2024
Ireland	23 September 2026	23 September 2027
Latvia	24 April 2020	24 April 2021
Liechtenstein	21 January 2022	21 January 2023
Lithuania	25 June 2024	25 June 2025
Luxembourg	2 April 2019	2 April 2020
Mexico	20 January 2023	20 January 2024
Netherlands (Note: The Netherlands' acceptance of the amendment to article 8 (biological weapons) (2017) has not been extended to Aruba, Curaçao, or Sint Maarten.)	21 April 2020	21 April 2021
New Zealand	14 October 2020	14 October 2021
Norway	22 March 2021	22 March 2022
Poland	8 July 2026	8 July 2027
Romania	14 February 2022	14 February 2023
San Marino	25 September 2025	25 September 2026
Seychelles	1 July 2025	1 July 2026
Slovakia	19 June 2019	19 June 2020
Slovenia	1 December 2022	1 December 2023
Spain	17 October 2025	17 October 2026
Sweden	26 January 2022	26 January 2023
Switzerland	7 July 2020	7 July 2021
Ukraine	25 October 2024	25 October 2025
Uruguay	21 March 2023	21 March 2024

== Amendment to article 8 (non-detectable fragments) (2017) ==
On 14 December 2017, during their 16th meeting the Assembly of States Parties adopted the amendment to article 8. The amendment inserted an article defining the use of weapons the primary effect of which is to injure by fragments undetectable by x-rays in the human body as a war crime.

=== States parties to the amendment ===
Because the amendment is to article 8, it will come into force only for those states parties which have ratified it, one year after doing so. As of September 2026, 27 states parties have ratified the amendment. The Rome Statute itself was amended on 2 April 2020 after the amendment came into force for the first state party to ratify it.

State	Ratified	Entry into force
Andorra	23 September 2025	23 September 2026
Belgium	21 June 2024	21 June 2025
Chile	21 September 2023	21 September 2024
Croatia	17 May 2021	17 May 2022
Cyprus	23 July 2024	23 July 2025
Czech Republic	10 July 2020	10 July 2021
Denmark (Note: The amendment to article 8 (non-detectable fragments) (2017) has not been extended to the Faroe Islands or Greenland.)	1 January 2025	1 January 2026
Estonia	15 April 2024	15 April 2025
Germany	21 September 2023	21 September 2024
Ireland	23 September 2026	23 September 2027
Latvia	24 April 2020	24 April 2021
Lithuania	25 June 2024	25 June 2025
Luxembourg	2 April 2019	2 April 2020
Mexico	20 January 2023	20 January 2024
Netherlands (Note: The Netherlands' acceptance of the amendment to article 8 (non-detectable fragments) (2017) has not been extended to Aruba, Curaçao, or Sint Maarten.)	21 April 2020	21 April 2021
New Zealand	14 October 2020	14 October 2021
Norway	22 March 2021	22 March 2022
Poland	8 July 2026	8 July 2027
Romania	14 February 2022	14 February 2023
San Marino	25 September 2025	25 September 2026
Seychelles	1 July 2025	1 July 2026
Slovakia	19 June 2019	19 June 2020
Slovenia	1 December 2022	1 December 2023
Spain	17 October 2025	17 October 2026
Switzerland	7 July 2020	7 July 2021
Ukraine	25 October 2024	25 October 2025
Uruguay	21 March 2023	21 March 2024

== Amendment to article 8 (blinding laser weapons) (2017) ==
On 14 December 2017, during their 16th meeting the Assembly of States Parties adopted the amendment to article 8. The amendment inserted an article defining the use of blinding laser weapons as a war crime.

=== States parties to the amendment ===
Because the amendment is to article 8, it will come into force only for those states parties which have ratified it, one year after doing so. As of September 2026, 27 states parties have ratified the amendment. The Rome Statute itself was amended on 2 April 2020 after the amendment came into force for the first state party to ratify it.

State	Ratified	Entry into force
Andorra	23 September 2025	23 September 2026
Belgium	21 June 2024	21 June 2025
Chile	21 September 2023	21 September 2024
Croatia	17 May 2021	17 May 2022
Cyprus	23 July 2024	23 July 2025
Czech Republic	10 July 2020	10 July 2021
Denmark (Note: The amendment to article 8 (blinding laser weapons) (2017) has not been extended to the Faroe Islands or Greenland.)	1 January 2025	1 January 2026
Estonia	15 April 2024	15 April 2025
Germany	21 September 2023	21 September 2024
Ireland	23 September 2026	23 September 2027
Latvia	24 April 2020	24 April 2021
Lithuania	25 June 2024	25 June 2025
Luxembourg	2 April 2019	2 April 2020
Mexico	20 January 2023	20 January 2024
Netherlands (Note: The Netherlands' acceptance of the amendment to article 8 (blinding laser weapons) (2017) has not been extended to Aruba, Curaçao, or Sint Maarten.)	21 April 2020	21 April 2021
New Zealand	14 October 2020	14 October 2021
Norway	22 March 2021	22 March 2022
Poland	8 July 2026	8 July 2027
Romania	14 February 2022	14 February 2023
San Marino	25 September 2025	25 September 2026
Seychelles	1 July 2025	1 July 2026
Slovakia	19 June 2019	19 June 2020
Slovenia	1 December 2022	1 December 2023
Spain	17 October 2025	17 October 2026
Switzerland	7 July 2020	7 July 2021
Ukraine	25 October 2024	25 October 2025
Uruguay	21 March 2023	21 March 2024

== Amendment to article 8 (starvation of civilians) (2019) ==
On 6 December 2019, at its ninth plenary meeting, the Assembly of States Parties adopted the amendment to article 8 defining the war crime of the intentional use of starvation of civilians as a method of warfare in armed conflicts not of an international character. The Rome Statute already makes the use of such means of warfare a war crime in international armed conflicts.

=== States parties to the amendment ===
Because the amendment is to article 8, it will come into force only for those states parties which have ratified it, one year after doing so. As of September 2026, 25 states parties have ratified the amendment. The Rome Statute itself was amended on 14 October 2021 after the amendment came into force for the first state party to ratify it.

State	Ratified	Entry into force
Andorra	3 November 2020	3 November 2021
Belgium	21 June 2024	21 June 2025
Croatia	17 May 2021	17 May 2022
Cyprus	23 July 2024	23 July 2025
Denmark (Note: The amendment to article 8 (starvation of civilians) (2019) has not been extended to the Faroe Islands or Greenland.)	1 January 2025	1 January 2026
Estonia	15 April 2024	15 April 2025
Germany	21 September 2023	21 September 2024
Ireland	23 September 2026	23 September 2027
Latvia	28 February 2025	28 February 2026
Liechtenstein	21 January 2022	21 January 2023
Lithuania	25 June 2024	25 June 2025
Luxembourg	4 August 2022	4 August 2023
Netherlands (Note: The Netherlands' acceptance of the amendment to article 8 (starvation of civilians) (2019) has not been extended to Aruba, Curaçao, or Sint Maarten.)	4 December 2020	4 December 2021
New Zealand	14 October 2020	14 October 2021
Norway	22 March 2021	22 March 2022
Poland	8 July 2026	8 July 2027
Portugal	26 May 2021	26 May 2022
Romania	14 February 2022	14 February 2023
San Marino	25 September 2025	25 September 2026
Seychelles	1 July 2025	1 July 2026
Slovenia	1 December 2022	1 December 2023
Spain	17 October 2025	17 October 2026
Switzerland	21 September 2022	21 September 2023
Ukraine	25 October 2024	25 October 2025
Uruguay	21 March 2023	21 March 2024

== Proposed amendments ==
A number of amendments have been proposed by states parties, but have either not been considered or adopted by the Assembly:

- African Union states parties have proposed allowing a state party that has jurisdiction over a situation before the Court to ask the United Nations Security Council to defer the matter, or alternatively, if the Security Council fails to make a decision the state party can ask the United Nations General Assembly to defer the matter.
- Kenya proposed several amendments, including making sitting heads of state immune from prosecution, subjecting ICC authorities to prosecution for crimes against the administration of justice, and granting the Independent Oversight Mechanism more authority.
- Mexico has proposed to list the use or the threat of use of nuclear weaponry as a war crime.
- The Netherlands has proposed adding terrorism as a prosecutable crime.
- Norway has proposed establishing a mechanism for allowing international or regional organizations to play a role in the enforcement of sentences.
- Trinidad and Tobago and Belize have proposed adding international drug trafficking as a prosecutable crime.
- Fiji, Samoa and Vanuatu have proposed adding ecocide as a prosecutable crime.
- Costa Rica, Germany, Sierra Leone, Slovenia, and Vanuatu have proposed changing the Court's jurisdiction over the crime of aggression to harmonize it with the scheme that applies to other crimes.
