= Ad hoc international criminal tribunals =

Ad hoc international criminal tribunals (year of establishment stated) include:

- International Military Tribunal (1945)
- International Military Tribunal for the Far East (1945)
- International Criminal Tribunal for the former Yugoslavia (1993)
- International Criminal Tribunal for Rwanda (1994)
- Special Court for Sierra Leone (2002)
- Extraordinary Chambers in the Courts of Cambodia (2004)
- Special Tribunal for Lebanon (2009)
- Kosovo Specialist Chambers (2017)
- Special Tribunal for the Crime of Aggression against Ukraine (25 June 2025)
