= Register of Damage for Ukraine =

Register for compensation for damages in the Russian invasion of Ukraine

- Register of Damage Caused by the Aggression of the Russian Federation against Ukraine
- Formation: 17 May 2023 (3 years ago)
- Headquarters: The Hague
- Leader: Markian Kliuchkovskyi (Executive director)
- Parent organization: Council of Europe
- Website: Official website

The Register of Damage Caused by the Aggression of the Russian Federation against Ukraine, also called the Register of Damage for Ukraine or RD4U, is a register founded by the Council of Europe for Ukrainian individuals, businesses, and state and municipal entities to seek compensation for damages from the Russian invasion of Ukraine. The register is an enlarged partial agreement, thereby allowing international cooperation between members and non-members within the framework of the Council of Europe. The Register is headquartered in The Hague, Netherlands, and has an office in Kyiv, Ukraine.

On 2 April 2024, the register opened to applications, receiving over 100 online applications within the first 24 hours, anticipating an eventual 300,000 to 600,000 claims.

As of April 2024, the register only accepts claims regarding the damage or destruction of residential real estate. Other categories, such as injury or loss, will gradually become available throughout 2024.

The register is not intended to pay compensation for claims, but is instead the initial approach to an international compensation mechanism that, by April 2024, had not yet been established. Preceding the creation of the Register in November 2022, the United Nations "recognized that Russia must be held to account for its violations of international law in Ukraine, including by way of payment of reparation."

In 2025, the registry was designated as an undesirable organization in Russia.

After the Convention establishing an International Claims Commission for Ukraine enters into force, the International Claims Commission for Ukraine will take over responsibility for the register.

== See also ==
- International Criminal Court investigation in Ukraine
- Legality of the Russian invasion of Ukraine
- Ukraine v. Russian Federation (2022)
