= Rome Statute =

1998 international treaty establishing the International Criminal Court

Rome Statute, a statute establishing the International Criminal Court
Rome Statute of the International Criminal Court
- Parties and signatories of the Statute State party Signatory that has not ratified State party that subsequently withdrew its membership Signatory that subsequently withdrew its signature Non-party, non-signatory
- Drafted: 17 July 1998
- Signed: 17 July 1998
- Location: Rome, Italy
- Effective: 1 July 2002
- Condition: 60 ratifications
- Signatories: 137
- Parties: 125
- Depositary: UN Secretary-General
- Languages: Arabic, Chinese, English, French, Russian and Spanish

Full text
- Rome Statute of the International Criminal Court at Wikisource
- www.ohchr.org/en/instruments-mechanisms/instruments/rome-statute-international-criminal-court

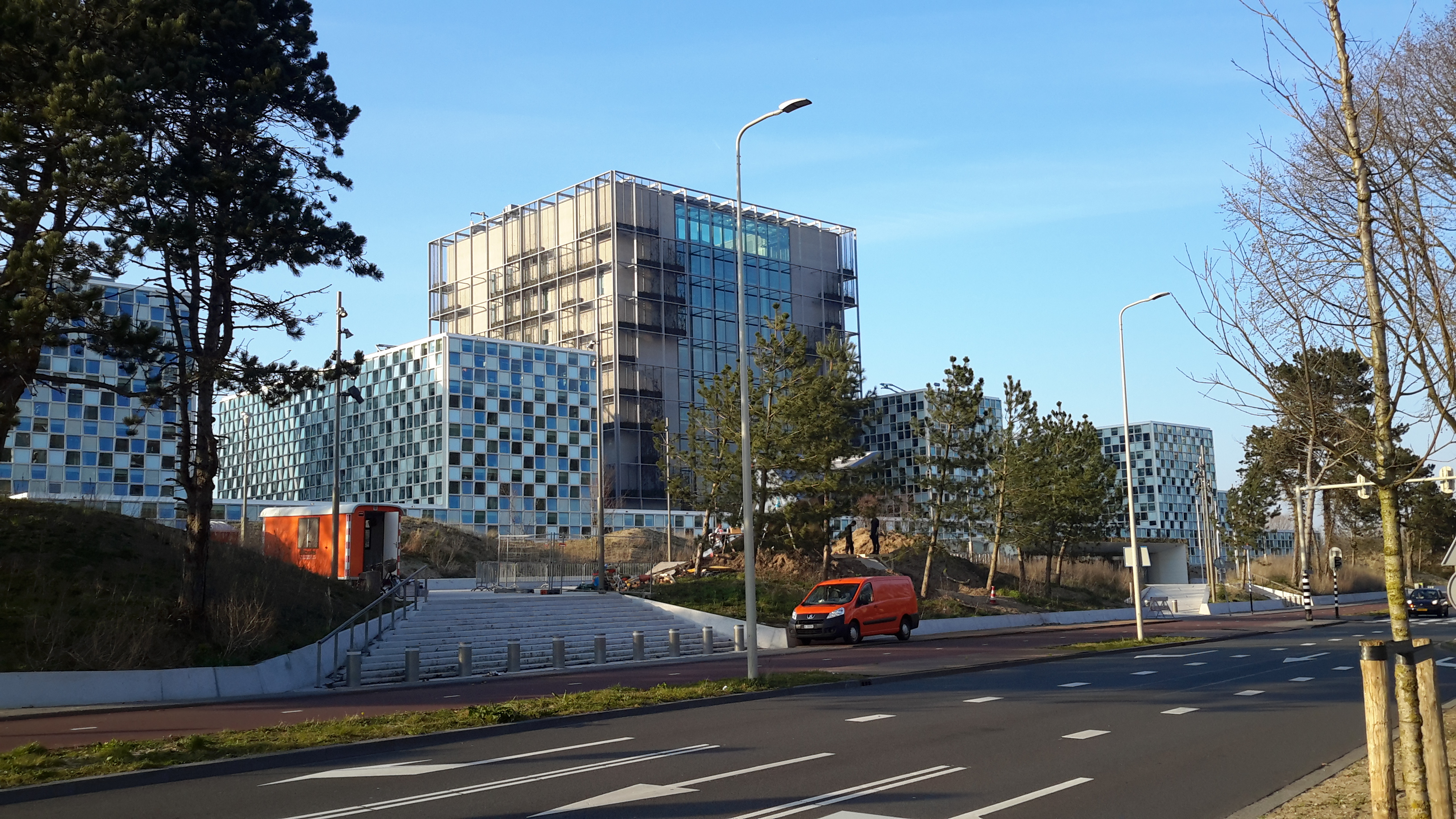
Headquarters of the International Criminal Court in The Hague

The Rome Statute of the International Criminal Court is the treaty that established the International Criminal Court (ICC). It was adopted at a diplomatic conference in Rome, Italy on 17 July 1998 and entered into force on 1 July 2002. As of January 2025, 125 states are party to the statute. Among other things, it establishes court function, jurisdiction and structure.

The Rome Statute established four core international crimes: genocide, crimes against humanity, war crimes, and the crime of aggression. Those crimes "shall not be subject to any statute of limitations." Under the Rome Statute, the ICC can only investigate and prosecute the four core international crimes in situations where states are "unable" or "unwilling" to do so themselves. The provisions on the crime of aggression did not take effect until after it was defined at the 2010 Kampala Conference.

The jurisdiction of the ICC is complementary to jurisdictions of domestic courts. The Court has jurisdiction over crimes only if they are committed in the territory of, by a national of, or on a vessel registered under a state party or a non-party that has accepted the jurisdiction of the Court; or if the United Nations Security Council makes a referral.

== Purpose ==
The Rome Statute established four core international crimes: (I) Genocide, (II) Crimes against humanity, (III) War crimes, and the (IV) Crime of aggression. Following years of negotiation, aimed at establishing a permanent international tribunal to prosecute individuals accused of genocide and other serious international crimes, such as crimes against humanity, war crimes and crimes of aggression, the United Nations General Assembly convened a five-week diplomatic conference in Rome in June 1998 "to finalize and adopt a convention on the establishment of an international criminal court".

== History ==
=== Background ===
The Rome Statute is the result of multiple attempts for the creation of a supranational and international tribunal. At the end of the 19th century, the international community took the first steps toward the institution of permanent courts with supranational jurisdiction. With the Hague International Peace Conferences of 1899 and 1907, representatives of the most powerful nations made an attempt to harmonize laws of war and to limit the use of technologically advanced weapons.

After the Nuremberg trials of Nazi leaders, international institutions began prosecuting individuals responsible for crimes against humanity which are inhumane actions that may be legal in a given nation, but represent gross human rights violations. In order to re-affirm basic principles of democratic civilisation, the accused received a regular trial, the right to defense and the presumption of innocence. The Nuremberg trials marked a crucial moment in legal history, and after that, some treaties that led to the drafting of the Rome Statute were signed.

UN General Assembly Resolution n. 260 9 December 1948, the Convention on the Prevention and Punishment of the Crime of Genocide, was the first step toward the establishment of an international permanent criminal tribunal with jurisdiction on crimes yet to be defined in international treaties. In the resolution there was a hope for an effort from the Legal UN commission in that direction.

The UN General Assembly, after the considerations expressed from the commission, established a committee to draft a statute and study the related legal issues. In 1951 a first draft was presented; a second draft followed in 1955 but there were a number of delays, officially due to the difficulties in the definition of the crime of aggression, that were only solved with diplomatic assemblies in the years following the statute's coming into force. The geopolitical tensions of the Cold War also contributed to the delays.

In December 1989, Trinidad and Tobago asked the UN General Assembly to re-open the talks for the establishment of an international criminal court and in 1994 presented a draft statute. The General Assembly created an ad hoc committee for the International Criminal Court and, after hearing the conclusions, a Preparatory Committee that worked on the draft for two years from 1996 to 1998.

Meanwhile, the United Nations created the ad hoc tribunals for the former Yugoslavia (ICTY) and for Rwanda (ICTR) using statutes—and amendments due to issues raised during pre-trial or trial stages of the proceedings—that are quite similar to the Rome Statute.

The UN’s International Law Commission considered the inclusion of the crime of ecocide to be included within the Draft Code of Crimes Against the Peace and Security of Mankind, the document which later became the Rome Statute. Article 26 (crime against the environment) was publicly supported by 19 countries in the Legal Committee but was removed due to opposition from the Netherlands, the United Kingdom and the United States of America.

=== Establishment ===
During its 52nd session, the UN General Assembly decided to convene a diplomatic conference "to finalize and adopt a convention on the establishment of an international criminal court." The conference was convened in Rome from 15 June 1998 to 17 July 1998. It was attended by representatives from 161 member states, along with observers from various other organizations, intergovernmental organizations and agencies, and non-governmental organizations (including many human rights groups) and was held at the headquarters of the Food and Agriculture Organization of the United Nations, located about 4 km away from the Vatican (one of the states represented). On 17 July 1998, the Rome Statute was adopted by a vote of 120 to 7, with 21 countries abstaining.

By agreement, there was no official record of each delegation's vote regarding the adoption of the Rome Statute. Therefore, there is some dispute over the identity of the seven countries that voted against the treaty.

It is certain that the People's Republic of China, Israel, and the United States were three of the seven because they have publicly confirmed their negative votes. India, Indonesia, Iraq, Libya, Qatar, Russia, Saudi Arabia, Sudan, and Yemen have been identified by various observers and commentators as possible sources for the other four negative votes, with Iraq, Libya, Qatar, and Yemen being the four most commonly identified.

Explanations of vote were made by India, Uruguay, Mauritius, Philippines, Norway, Belgium, United States, Brazil, Israel, Sri Lanka, China, Turkey, Singapore, and the United Kingdom.

On 11 April 2002, 10 countries ratified the Rome Statute at the same time at a special ceremony held at the United Nations headquarters in New York City, bringing the total number of signatories to 60, which was the minimum number required to bring the statute into force, as defined in Article 126. The treaty entered into force on 1 July 2002; the ICC can only prosecute crimes committed on or after that date.

The states parties held a Review Conference in Kampala, Uganda from 31 May 2010 to 11 June 2010. The Review Conference adopted a definition of the crime of aggression, thereby allowing the ICC to exercise jurisdiction over the crime for the first time. It also adopted an expansion of the list of war crimes. Amendments to the statute were proposed to implement these changes.

== Ratification status ==
As of January 2025, 125 states (Note: The sum of (a) states parties, (b) signatories and (c) non-signatory United Nations member states is 195. This number is two more than the number of United Nations member states (193) due to Palestine and Cook Islands being states parties but not United Nations member states.) are parties to the Statute of the Court, including all the countries of South America, nearly all of Europe, most of Oceania and roughly half of Africa. Burundi and the Philippines were member states, but later withdrew effective 27 October 2017 and 17 March 2019, respectively. A further 29 countries have signed but not ratified the Rome Statute. The law of treaties obliges these states to refrain from "acts which would defeat the object and purpose" of the treaty until they declare they do not intend to become a party to the treaty. Four signatory states have informed the UN Secretary General that they no longer intend to become states parties and, as such, have no legal obligations arising from their signature of the Statute; they are Israel in 2002, the United States on 6 May 2002, Sudan on 26 August 2008, and Russia on 30 November 2016. Forty-one other states have neither signed nor acceded to the Rome Statute. Some of them, including China and India, are critical of the Court.

== Jurisdiction, structure and amendment ==
The Rome Statute outlines the structure and areas of jurisdiction of the International Criminal Court. The Court can prosecute individuals (but not states or organizations) for four kinds of crimes: genocide, crimes against humanity, war crimes, and the crime of aggression. These crimes are detailed in Articles 6, 7, 8, and 8 bis of the Rome Statute, respectively. They must have been committed after 1 July 2002, when the Rome Statute came into effect.

The International Criminal Court has jurisdiction over these crimes in three cases: first, if they took place on the territory of a state party; second, if they were committed by a national of a state party; or third, if the crimes were referred to the Prosecutor by the UN Security Council. The Court may begin an investigation before issuing a warrant if the crimes were referred by the UN Security Council or if a state party requests an investigation. Otherwise, the Prosecutor must seek authorization from a Pre-Trial Chamber of three judges to begin an investigation proprio motu (on its own initiative). The only type of immunity the ICC recognizes is that it cannot prosecute those under the age of 18 when the crime was committed. In particular, no officials (not even a head of state) are immune from prosecution.

The issue of immunities from the jurisdiction of the ICC has become recently relevant, when the Court issued arrest warrants for Russian and Israeli national leaders, since their immunities are granted from states which are not parties to the Rome Statute. States which have ratified the statute have waived the immunities of their officials with respect to the jurisdiction of the court by accepting the provisions of Article 27:

Article 27

Irrelevance of official capacity

1. This Statute shall apply equally to all persons without any distinction based on official capacity. In particular, official capacity as a Head of State or Government, a member of a Government or parliament, an elected representative or a government official shall in no case exempt a person from criminal responsibility under this Statute, nor shall it, in and of itself, constitute a ground for reduction of sentence.

2. Immunities or special procedural rules which may attach to the official capacity of a person, whether under national or international law, shall not bar the Court from exercising its jurisdiction over such a person.

However, according to the Vienna Convention on the Law of Treaties, states which have not ratified a treaty cannot be bound by its provisions, meaning that states such as Russia and Israel have not agreed to waive the immunities of their officials for that purpose. On the other hand, states which are bound to cooperate with the Court under part 9 of the Rome Statute, shall comply with any and all cooperation requests of the Court, including arrest warrants for officials of non-state parties. However, Article 98 of the Statue, which has been used as an argument by state parties defending their non-compliance in assisting with arrest warrants as such reads as follows:

Article 98

Cooperation with respect to waiver of immunity and consent to surrender

1.The Court may not proceed with a request for surrender or assistance which would require the requested State to act inconsistently with its obligations under international law with respect to the State or diplomatic immunity of a person or property of a third State, unless the Court can first obtain the cooperation of that third State for the waiver of the immunity.

2. The Court may not proceed with a request for surrender which would require the requested State to act inconsistently with its obligations under international agreements pursuant to which the consent of a sending State is required to surrender a person of that State to the Court, unless the Court can first obtain the cooperation of the sending State for the giving of consent for the surrender.

The court has established a few different arguments to deal with this.

The first argument, as established in the Al-Bashir case, and commonly known as "The Security Council route," is based on the premise that when a situation is referred to the Court by the UN Security Council in accordance with Article 13(b) of the Statute, such a referral itself necessarily places the state in question into an analogous position to that of a state party to the Rome Statute, "at least when it comes to cooperation with the Court", which includes the waiver of immunities provided in Article 27.

Another argument, which was reaffirmed by the Court in the decision against Mongolia in 2024 (in light of their non-compliance in choosing not to assist with an arrest warrant for Vladimir Putin), references Article 31 of the Vienna Convention on the Law of Treaties, which states "A treaty shall be interpreted in good faith in accordance with the ordinary meaning to be given to the terms of the treaty in their context and in the light ofits object and purpose." Given that "an interpretation of Articles 27 and 98 which protected non-state party nationals from the execution of arrest warrants would critically undermine the ICC’s functions" and that the original purpose of state immunities, including the personal immunities of heads of state, under Article 98 is not to provide protection from accountability for serious international crimes, the Court therefore concluded that such immunities"do not operate before it."

The Rome Statute established three bodies: the International Criminal Court itself, the Assembly of States Parties (ASP), and the Trust Fund for Victims. The ASP has two subsidiary bodies. These are the Permanent Secretariat, established in 2003, and an elected Bureau which includes a president and vice-president. The ICC itself has four organs: the Presidency (with mostly administrative responsibilities); the Divisions (the Pre-Trial, Trial, and Appeals judges); the Office of the Prosecutor; and the Registry (whose role is to support the other three organs). The functions of these organs are detailed in Part 4 of the Rome Statute.

Any amendment to the Rome Statute requires the support of a two-thirds majority of the states parties, and an amendment (except those amending the list of crimes) will not enter into force until it has been ratified by seven-eighths of the states parties. A state party which has not ratified such an amendment may withdraw with immediate effect, as long as it does so within a year of the amendment taking effect. Any amendment to the list of crimes within the jurisdiction of the court will only apply to those states parties that have ratified it. It does not need a seven-eighths majority of ratifications.

== See also ==
- States parties to the Rome Statute
- Review Conference of the Rome Statute
- Amendments to the Rome Statute of the International Criminal Court
- International Criminal Court Act 2001
- Völkerstrafgesetzbuch
- World Day for International Justice
- Outline of genocide studies
- International Criminal Court
- War crimes
- Geneva Conventions
- Law of armed conflict, also known as law of war or international humanitarian law
- Jus in bello, a legal doctrine of armed conflict
