= United Nations General Assembly Resolution 3314 (XXIX) =

UN General Assembly Resolution 3314
- Date: 14 December 1974
- Meeting no.: 29
- Code: A/RES/3314 (Document)
- Subject: Adoption of the definition of aggression
- Result: Adopted by consensus

United Nations General Assembly Resolution 3314 (XXIX) (Definition of Aggression) was adopted by the United Nations General Assembly on December 14, 1974 as a non-binding recommendation to the United Nations Security Council on the definition it should use for the crime of aggression.

== Background ==
The adoption of the definition was the culmination of a long process begun in 1923 under the auspices of the League of Nations. In December 1967 the General Assembly adopted Resolution 2330 (XXII), which established a Special Committee on the Question of Defining Aggression. This body comprised 35 member states. After seven years, it reported back to the General Assembly with draft proposals that formed the basis of the final Definition of Aggression.

== The definition of aggression ==
The definition makes a distinction between aggression (which "gives rise to international responsibility") and war of aggression (which is "a crime against international peace"). Article 3 "in accordance with the provisions of article 2", defines certain acts as aggression, namely:

- armed invasions or attacks, occupation and annexation by force,
- bombardments,
- blockades,
- attacks on armed forces or civilian merchant or air fleet of a state,
- armed violations of Status of forces agreements,

Also, certain use of third parties as "proxy" is attributable as own acts to a state, namely:

- permitting other states to use one's own territory to perpetrate acts of aggression, and
- the employment of armed irregulars or mercenaries to carry out acts of aggression.

Article 2 states that the first use of force in contravention of the UN Charter will be prima facie evidence of aggression, but the Security Council has the authority to determine that given the circumstances aggression has not taken place. A war of aggression is a series of acts committed with a sustained intent. The definition's distinction between an act of aggression and a war of aggression make it clear that not every act of aggression would constitute a crime against peace; only war of aggression does. States would nonetheless be held responsible for acts of aggression.

== Relationship to the definition of the crime of aggression ==
Resolution 3314 forms with United Nations General Assembly Resolution 2625 (XXV) an integral part of the normative arsenal of international law and continue to exert substantial influence in determining the legality of the use of force between states, the protection of sovereignty, and the promotion of international peace and security.

However, the provisions of Resolution 2625 (XXV) of 1970 have a significantly broader scope than the more narrowly defined concept of aggression set out in UN General Assembly Resolution 3314 (XXIX). While a violation of the latter constitutes an international crime, unlawful intervention under the 1970 resolution is limited to an international delict, which renders states responsible but does not entail individual criminal responsibility for their leaders.

== Criticisms of the definition ==
The wording of the definition has been criticised by many commentators. Its clauses on the use of armed irregulars are vague, as it is unclear what level of "involvement" would entail state responsibility. It is also highly state-centric, in that it deems states to be the only actors liable for acts of aggression. Domestic or transnational insurgent groups, such as those that took part in the Sierra Leone Civil War and the Yugoslav Wars, were key players in their respective conflicts despite being non-state parties; they would not have come within the scope of the definition.

The Definition of Aggression also does not cover acts by international organisations. The two key military alliances at the time of the definition's adoption, NATO and the Warsaw Pact, were non-state parties and thus were outside the scope of the definition. Moreover, the definition does not deal with the responsibilities of individuals for acts of aggression. It is widely perceived as an insufficient basis on which to ground individual criminal prosecutions.

The definition is not binding on the Security Council. The United Nations Charter empowers the General Assembly to make recommendations to the United Nations Security Council but the Assembly may not dictate to the Council. The resolution accompanying the definition states that it is intended to provide guidance to the Security Council to aid it "in determining, in accordance with the Charter, the existence of an act of aggression". The Security Council may apply or disregard this guidance as it sees fit. Legal commentators argued in 1999 that the Definition of Aggression has had "no visible impact" on the deliberations of the Security Council.

== See also ==
- Command responsibility
- Crime against peace
- Review Conference of the Rome Statute
