= War of aggression =

Military conflict waged without the justification of self-defense

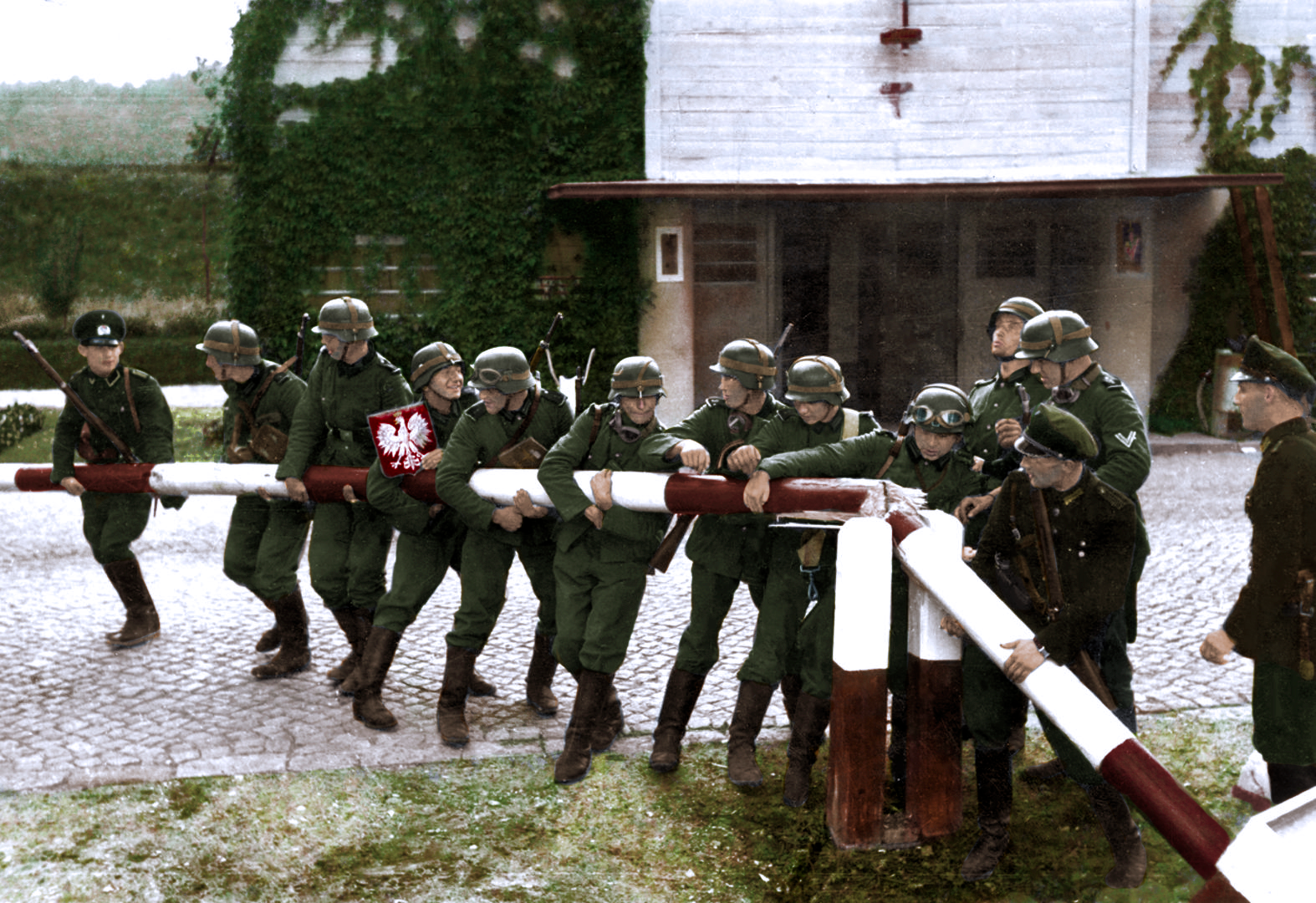
Colored image of Danzig Police re-enacting the destruction of a Polish border post

A war of aggression, sometimes also war of choice, is a military conflict waged without the justification of self-defense, often for territorial gain and subjugation as a war of conquest, in contrast with the concept of a just war or war of necessity.

Wars without international legality (i.e. not out of self-defense nor sanctioned by the United Nations Security Council) can be considered wars of aggression. However, this alone usually does not constitute the definition of a war of aggression: certain wars may be unlawful but not aggressive (a war to settle a boundary dispute where the initiator has a reasonable claim, and limited aims, is one example).

In the judgment of the International Military Tribunal at Nuremberg, which followed World War II, "War is essentially an evil thing. Its consequences are not confined to the belligerent states alone, but affect the whole world. To initiate a war of aggression, therefore, is not only an international crime; it is the supreme international crime differing only from other war crimes in that it contains within itself the accumulated evil of the whole."

Article 39 of the United Nations Charter provides that the UN Security Council shall determine the existence of any act of aggression and "shall make recommendations, or decide what measures shall be taken in accordance with Articles 41 and 42, to maintain or restore international peace and security".

The Rome Statute of the International Criminal Court refers to the crime of aggression as one of the "most serious crimes of concern to the international community", and provides that the crime falls within the jurisdiction of the International Criminal Court (ICC). However, the Rome Statute stipulates that the ICC may not exercise its jurisdiction over the crime of aggression until such time as the states parties agree on a definition of the crime and set out the conditions under which it may be prosecuted. At the Kampala Review Conference on 11 June 2010, a total of 111 State Parties to the Court agreed by consensus to adopt a resolution accepting the definition of the crime and the conditions for the exercise of jurisdiction over this crime. The relevant amendments to the Statute entered into force on July 17, 2018 after being ratified by 35 States Parties. The Kellogg–Briand Pact was a similar effort to define and prohibit a war of aggression.

Possibly the first trial for waging aggressive war is that of the Sicilian king Conradin in 1268.

== Definitions ==
The origin of the concept, the author Peter Maguire argues, emerged from the debate on Article 231 of the Treaty of Versailles of 1919: "Germany accepts the responsibility of Germany and her allies for causing all the loss and damage to which the Allied and Associated Governments and their nationals have been subjected as a consequence of the war imposed upon them by the aggression of Germany and her allies." Maguire argues:

Originally President Wilson resisted the effort to brand Germany with war guilt, but French and British leaders forced him to compromise. Naming Germany an 'aggressor' introduced the concept into positive international law.

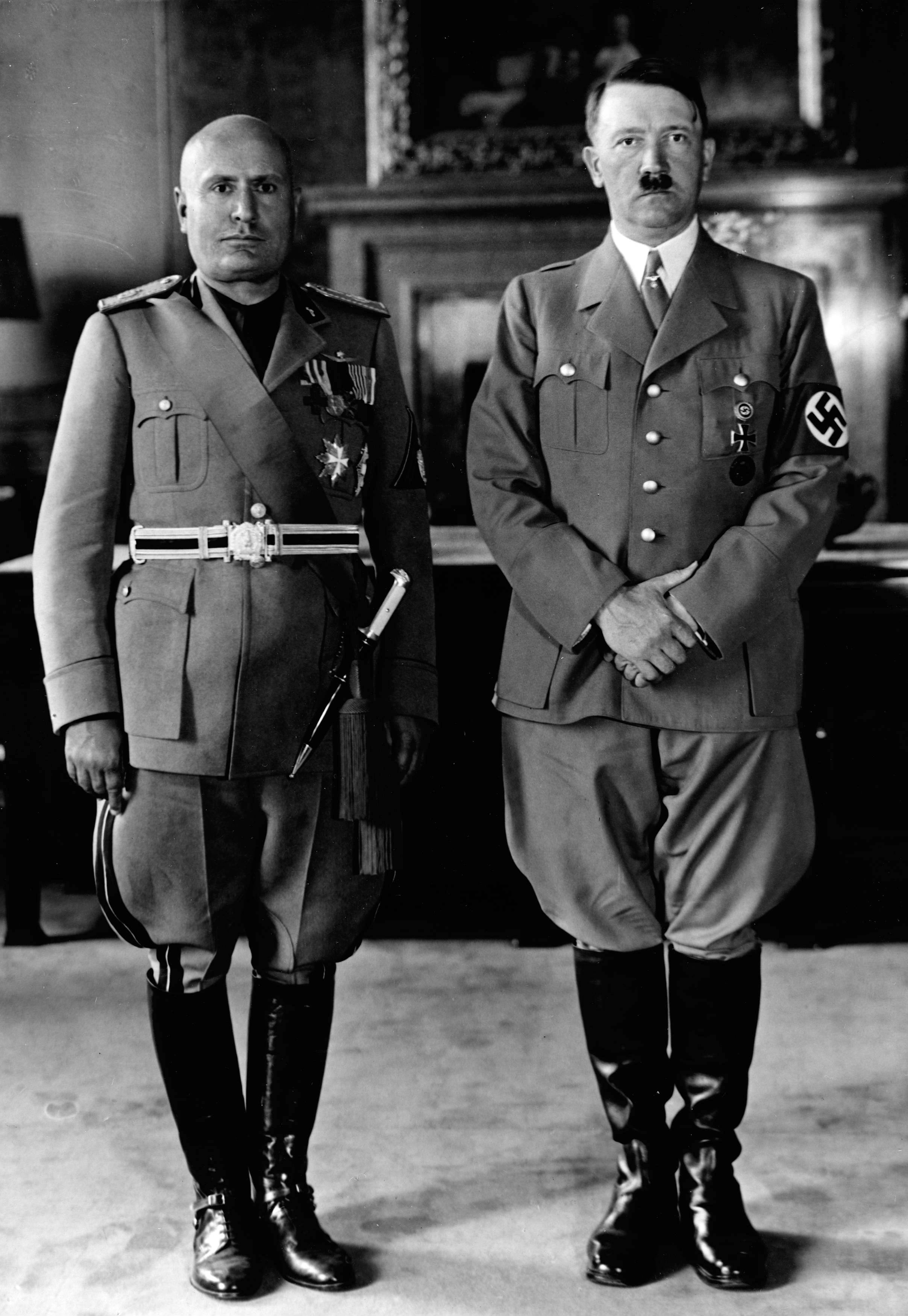
Italian fascist leader Benito Mussolini and Nazi Germany's leader Adolf Hitler in 1940

The Japanese invasion of Manchuria had a significant negative effect on the moral strength and influence of the League of Nations. As critics had predicted, the League was powerless if a strong nation decided to pursue an aggressive policy against other countries, allowing a country such as Japan to commit blatant aggression without serious consequences. Adolf Hitler and Benito Mussolini were also aware of this, and ultimately both followed Japan's example in aggression against their neighbors: in the case of Italy, against Ethiopia (1935–1937) and Albania (1939); and Germany, against Czechoslovakia (1938–1939) and Poland (1939).

In November 1935, the League of Nations condemned Italy's aggression in Ethiopia and imposed economic sanctions. The prominent jurist Hans Kelsen argued that in the Ethiopian case, the League had "at least made certain efforts to fulfill its duty in the cases of illegal aggression undertaken by member states against other member states."

=== The Convention for the Definition of Aggression ===
Two Conventions for the Definition of Aggression were signed in London on 3 and 4 July 1933. The first was signed by Czechoslovakia, Romania, the Soviet Union, Turkey and Yugoslavia, and came into effect on 17 February 1934, when it was ratified by all of them but Turkey. The second was signed by Afghanistan (ratified 20 October 1933), Estonia (4 December), Latvia (4 December), Persia (16 November), Poland (16 October), Romania (16 October), the Soviet Union (16 October) and Turkey, which ratified both treaties on 23 March 1934. Finland acceded to the second convention on 31 January 1934. The second convention was the first to be registered with the League of Nations Treaty Series on 29 March 1934, while the first was registered on 26 April. As Lithuania refused to sign any treaty including Poland, it signed the definition of aggression in a separate pact with the Soviet Union on 5 July 1933, also in London, and exchanged ratifications on 14 December. It was registered in the Treaty Series on 16 April 1934.

The signatories of both treaties were also signatories of the Kellogg–Briand Pact prohibiting aggression, and were seeking an agreed definition of the latter. Czechoslovakia, Romania and Yugoslavia were members of the Little Entente, and their signatures alarmed Bulgaria, since the definition of aggression clearly covered its support of the Internal Macedonian Revolutionary Organization. Both treaties base their definition on the "Politis Report" of the Committee of Security Questions made 24 March 1933 to the Conference for the Reduction and Limitation of Armaments, in answer to a proposal of the Soviet delegation. The Greek politician Nikolaos Politis was behind the inclusion of "support for armed bands" as a form of aggression. Ratifications for both treaties were deposited in Moscow, as the convention was primarily the work of Maxim Litvinov, the Soviet signatory. The convention defined an act of aggression as follows:

- Declaration of war upon another State.
- Invasion by its armed forces, with or without a declaration of war, of the territory of another State.
- Attack by its land, naval or air forces, with or without a declaration of war, on the territory, vessels or aircraft of another State.
- Naval blockade of the coasts or ports of another State.
- Provision of support to armed bands formed in its territory which have invaded the territory of another State, or refusal, notwithstanding the request of the invaded State, to take, in its own territory, all the measures in its power to deprive those bands of all assistance or protection.

The League prerogative under that convention to expel a League member found guilty of aggression was used by the League Assembly only once, against the Soviet government itself, on December 14, 1939, following the Soviet invasion of Finland.

Primary documents:

- Text of the Convention of 3 July
- Text of the Convention of 4 July
- Text of the Convention of 5 July

=== The Nuremberg Principles ===
In 1945, the London Charter of the International Military Tribunal defined three categories of crimes, including crimes against peace. This definition was first used by Finland to prosecute the political leadership in the war-responsibility trials in Finland. The principles were later known as the Nuremberg Principles.

In 1950, the Nuremberg Tribunal defined Crimes against Peace, in Principle VI, specifically Principle VI(a), submitted to the United Nations General Assembly, as:

1. Planning, preparation, initiation or waging of a war of aggression or a war in violation of international treaties, agreements or assurances;
2. Participation in a common plan or conspiracy for the accomplishment of any of the acts mentioned under (i).

See: Nuremberg trials: "The legal basis for the jurisdiction of the court was that defined by the Instrument of Surrender of Germany, political authority for Germany had been transferred to the Allied Control Council, which having sovereign power over Germany could choose to punish violations of international law and the laws of war. Because the court was limited to violations of the laws of war, it did not have jurisdiction over crimes that took place before the outbreak of war on September 1, 1939."

For committing this crime, the Nuremberg Tribunal sentenced a number of persons responsible for starting World War II. One consequence of this is that nations who are starting an armed conflict must now argue that they are either exercising the right of self-defense, the right of collective defense, or – it seems – the enforcement of the criminal law of jus cogens. It has made formal declaration of war uncommon after 1945.

Reading the Tribunal's final judgment in court, British alternate judge Norman Birkett said:

The charges in the Indictment that the defendants planned and waged aggressive wars are charges of the utmost gravity. War is essentially an evil thing. Its consequences are not confined to the belligerent states alone, but affect the whole world. To initiate a war of aggression, therefore, is not only an international crime; it is the supreme international crime differing only from other war crimes in that it contains within itself the accumulated evil of the whole.

Associate Supreme Court Justice William O. Douglas charged that the Allies were guilty of "substituting power for principle" at Nuremberg: "I thought at the time and still think that the Nuremberg trials were unprincipled. Law was created ex post facto to suit the passion and clamor of the time."

=== The United Nations Charter ===
The relevant provisions of the Charter of the United Nations mentioned in the RSICC article 5.2 were framed to include the Nuremberg Principles. The specific principle is Principle VI.a "Crimes against peace", which was based on the provisions of the London Charter of the International Military Tribunal that was issued in 1945 and formed the basis for the post World War II war crime trials. The Charter's provisions based on the Nuremberg Principle VI.a are:

- Article 1:
  - The Purposes of the United Nations are:
    1. To maintain international peace and security, and to that end: to take effective collective measures for the prevention and removal of threats to the peace, and for the suppression of acts of aggression or other breaches of the peace, and to bring about by peaceful means, and in conformity with the principles of justice and international law, adjustment or settlement of international disputes or situations which might lead to a breach of the peace;
    2. To develop friendly relations among nations based on respect for the principle of equal rights and self-determination of peoples, and to take other appropriate measures to strengthen universal peace;
- Article 2, paragraph 4
  - All Members shall refrain in their international relations from the threat or use of force against the territorial integrity or political independence of any state, or in any other manner inconsistent with the Purposes of the United Nations.
- Article 33
  - The parties to any dispute, the continuance of which is likely to endanger the maintenance of international peace and security, shall, first of all, seek a solution by negotiation, enquiry, mediation, conciliation, arbitration, judicial settlement, resort to regional agencies or arrangements, or other peaceful means of their own choice.
  - The Security Council shall, when it deems necessary, call upon the parties to settle their dispute by such means.
- Article 39
  - The Security Council shall determine the existence of any threat to the peace, breach of the peace, or act of aggression and shall make recommendations, or decide what measures shall be taken in accordance with Articles 41 and 42, to maintain or restore international peace and security.

=== The Inter-American Treaty of Reciprocal Assistance (Rio Pact) ===
The Inter-American Treaty of Reciprocal Assistance, signed in Rio de Janeiro on September 2, 1947, included a clear definition of aggression. Article 9 stated:

In addition to other acts which the Organ of Consultation may characterize as aggression, the following shall be considered as such:

1. Unprovoked armed attack by a State against the territory, the people, or the land, sea or air forces of another State;
2. Invasion, by the armed forces of a State, of the territory of an American State, through the trespassing of boundaries demarcated in accordance with a treaty, judicial decision, or arbitral award, or, in the absence of frontiers thus demarcated, invasion affecting a region which is under the effective jurisdiction of another State.

=== Further discussions on defining aggression ===
The discussions on definition of aggression under the UN began in 1950, following the outbreak of the Korean War. As the western governments, headed by Washington, were in favor of defining the governments of North Korea and the People's Republic of China as aggressor states, the Soviet government proposed to formulate a new UN resolution defining aggression and based on the 1933 convention. As a result, on November 17, 1950, the General Assembly passed resolution 378, which referred the issue to be defined by the International Law Commission. The commission deliberated over this issue in its 1951 session and due to large disagreements among its members, decided "that the only practical course was to aim at a general and abstract definition (of aggression)". However, a tentative definition of aggression was adopted by the commission on June 4, 1951, which stated:

Aggression is the use of force by a State or Government against another State or Government, in any manner, whatever the weapons used and whether openly or otherwise, for any reason or for any purpose other than individual or collective self-defence or in pursuance of a decision or recommendation by a competent organ of the United Nations.

=== General Assembly Resolution 3314 ===
On December 14, 1974, the United Nations General Assembly adopted Resolution 3314, which defined aggression by states.

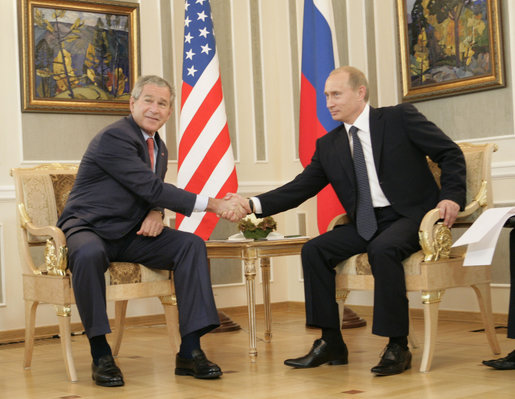
US President George W. Bush and Russian President Vladimir Putin were both accused of starting a war of aggression.

The Definition of Aggression does not cover acts by international organizations. The two key military alliances at the time of the definition's adoption, NATO and the Warsaw Pact, were non-state parties and thus were outside the scope of the definition. Moreover, the definition does not deal with the responsibilities of individuals for acts of aggression. It is widely perceived as an insufficient basis on which to ground individual criminal prosecutions.

The definition is not binding on the Security Council. The United Nations Charter empowers the General Assembly to make recommendations to the United Nations Security Council but the Assembly may not dictate to the Council. The resolution accompanying the definition states that it is intended to provide guidance to the Security Council to aid it "in determining, in accordance with the Charter, the existence of an act of aggression". The Security Council may apply or disregard this guidance as it sees fit. Legal commentators argue that the Definition of Aggression has had "no visible impact" on the deliberations of the Security Council.

=== Rome Statute of the International Criminal Court ===
The Rome Statute of the International Criminal Court lists the crime of aggression as one of the most serious crimes of concern to the international community, and provides that the crime falls within the jurisdiction of the International Criminal Court (ICC). However, Article 5.2 of the Rome Statute states that "The Court shall exercise jurisdiction over the crime of aggression once a provision is adopted in accordance with articles 121 and 123 defining the crime and setting out the conditions under which the Court shall exercise jurisdiction with respect to this crime. Such a provision shall be consistent with the relevant provisions of the Charter of the United Nations." The Assembly of States Parties of the ICC adopted such a definition in 2010 at the Review Conference in Kampala, Uganda.

== See also ==
- Right of conquest
- Command responsibility
- Peremptory norm
- Jus ad bellum
- List of war crimes
- Nuremberg principles
- Preventive war
- Voluntary war
- War of liberation
