= United Nations General Assembly Resolution 2625 (XXV) =

UN General Assembly Resolution 2625 (XXV)
- Date: 24 October 1970
- Meeting no.: 1883 plenary
- Code: 2625 (XXV) (Document)
- Subject: Declaration on Principles of International Law concerning Friendly Relations and Co-operation among States
- Result: Adopted by consensus

The United Nations General Assembly Resolution 2625, "The Declaration on Principles of International Law concerning Friendly Relations and Co-operation among States" was adopted by the General Assembly on 24 October 1970, during a commemorative session to celebrate the twenty-fifth anniversary of the United Nations. The Declaration worked out the most authoritative and comprehensive formulation so far of the principle of self-determination.

== Content ==
According to this document "the principle of equal rights and self-determination of peoples enshrined in the Charter of the United Nations" embraces the right of all peoples "freely to determine, without external interference, their political status and to pursue their economic, social and cultural development" as well as the duty of every State "to respect this right in accordance with the provisions of the Charter". It further added that "the establishment of a sovereign and independent State, the free association or integration with an independent State, or the emergence into any other political status freely determined by a people constitute modes of implementing the right of self-determination", thus stressing, as the critical issue, the methods of reaching the decision and not the result.

== Role in International law ==
Resolution 2625 was adopted in a context of increasing decolonization and a redefinition of geopolitical balances. It codifies fundamental principles of international law, including the prohibition on the use of force, the principle of non-intervention, the sovereign equality of states, and the right of peoples to self-determination. The International Court of Justice has recognized the customary value of these principles, as demonstrated in the Nicaragua v. United States judgment of 1986, where the Court explicitly referred to Resolution 2625 as evidence of the existence of customary obligations parallel to those arising from the UN Charter, in light of which the notion of armed attack must be interpreted.

Resolution 3314 (XXIX) of 1974 on the definition of aggression, adopted by the same General Assembly four years later (on 14 December 1974), serves as an operational complement to Resolution 2625. It defines in detailed terms what constitutes an "act of aggression", listing situations such as armed invasion, bombardment, blockade of ports, or support for armed militias operating against another state. Although not legally binding, the resolution provides authoritative guidance for interpreting Article 2(4) of the United Nations Charter, and it has been used both in legal scholarship and in international case law to assess the legality of the use of force.

From a systematic perspective, Resolution 2625 provides the general axiological and normative framework, while Resolution 3314 performs an applicative and specifying function. Both resolutions are closely linked to Articles 1, 2(4), and 51 of the UN Charter and have been used in international practice to interpret state obligations regarding the use of force. The prevailing doctrine—including the works of Antonio Cassese, Ian Brownlie, and Bruno Simma—confirms the importance of these two resolutions not only as soft law instruments but as texts that crystallize binding international principles and customs.

== Bibliography ==
- Antonio Cassese, International Law (Oxford University Press, 2nd ed. 2005)
- Ian Brownlie, Principles of Public International Law (Oxford, various editions)
- Bruno Simma (ed.), The Charter of the United Nations: A Commentary (Oxford University Press, 3rd ed. 2012)
- Christine Gray, International Law and the Use of Force (Oxford University Press, 4th ed. 2018)
- Nicolas Tsagourias and Nigel D. White, Collective Security: Theory, Law and Practice
