= Crime of aggression =

Aggressive use of state military force that violates the Charter of the United Nations

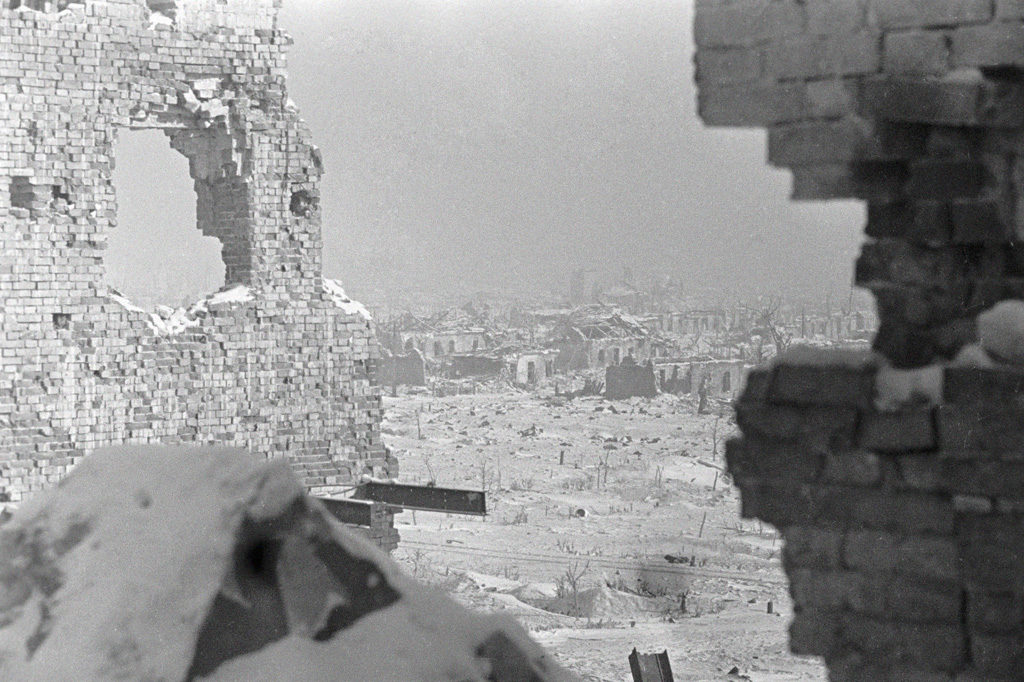
The crime of aggression was conceived by Soviet jurist Aron Trainin in the wake of the German invasion of the Soviet Union during World War II. Pictured: Stalingrad in ruins, December 1942

A crime of aggression or crime against peace is the planning, initiation, or execution of a large-scale and serious act of aggression using state military force. The definition and scope of the crime is controversial. The Rome Statute contains an exhaustive list of acts of aggression that can give rise to individual criminal responsibility, which include invasion, military occupation, annexation by the use of force, bombardment, and military blockade of ports. In general, committing an act of aggression is a leadership crime that can only be committed by those with the power to shape a state's policy of aggression, as opposed to those who discharge it.

The philosophical basis for the wrongness of aggression is found in just war theory, in which waging a war without a just cause for self-defense is unjust. In the wake of the German invasion of the Soviet Union during World War II, Soviet jurist Aron Trainin made the first successful proposal to criminalize aggression. The Charter of the International Military Tribunal provided criminal liability for waging aggressive war, which was the main focus of the Nuremberg trial. Other participants in World War II were tried for aggression in Finland, Poland, China, the subsequent Nuremberg trials, and the Tokyo trial. No one has been prosecuted for aggression either before or since the 1940s.

There are cases that make the definition especially vague, like "war on terror", which is by definition state-initiated harm. This case might present the use of existing legal and social frameworks to "construct an environment within which the applicability of the relevant international norms was either severely restricted or uncertain", and thus justify the brute fact of aggression.

It is generally accepted that the crime of aggression exists in international customary law. The definitions and the conditions for the exercise of jurisdiction over this crime by the International Criminal Court were adopted in 2010 at the Kampala Review Conference by the states parties to the court. Aggression is criminalized according to the statute law of some countries, and can be prosecuted under universal jurisdiction.

Aggression is one of the core crimes in international criminal law, alongside genocide, crimes against humanity, and war crimes. In 1946, the International Military Tribunal ruled that aggression was "the supreme international crime" because "it contains within itself the accumulated evil of the whole". The standard view is that aggression is a crime against the state that is attacked, but it can also be considered a crime against individuals who are killed or harmed as a result of war.

== Background ==
=== Just war theory ===
Warfare has been part of human experience since the beginning of human history. The criminalization of aggression is of recent origin, dating to after World War II, but the idea of aggression as a grave moral transgression and violation of the international order dates back much farther. Just war theory, over the centuries, held that a war fought for territorial aggrandizement was unjust, and that just wars are fought only for self-defense, or in defense of allies, against such aggression. The philosophical basis for the criminalization of aggression derives from eighteenth-century theorist Emer de Vattel, although Vattel did not envision formal trials for aggression, simply the execution of wrongdoers. Early modern just war theorists conceived aggression as the first wrong committed against another country, rather than the first military strike. Hugo Grotius, often considered the founder of international law, saw the principal wrong in aggression in the violation of individual rights. In 1815, Napoleon was outlawed "as an Enemy and Disturber of the tranquillity of the World" in what was considered an "Exception to general rules of the Law of Nations".

=== World War I and interwar ===
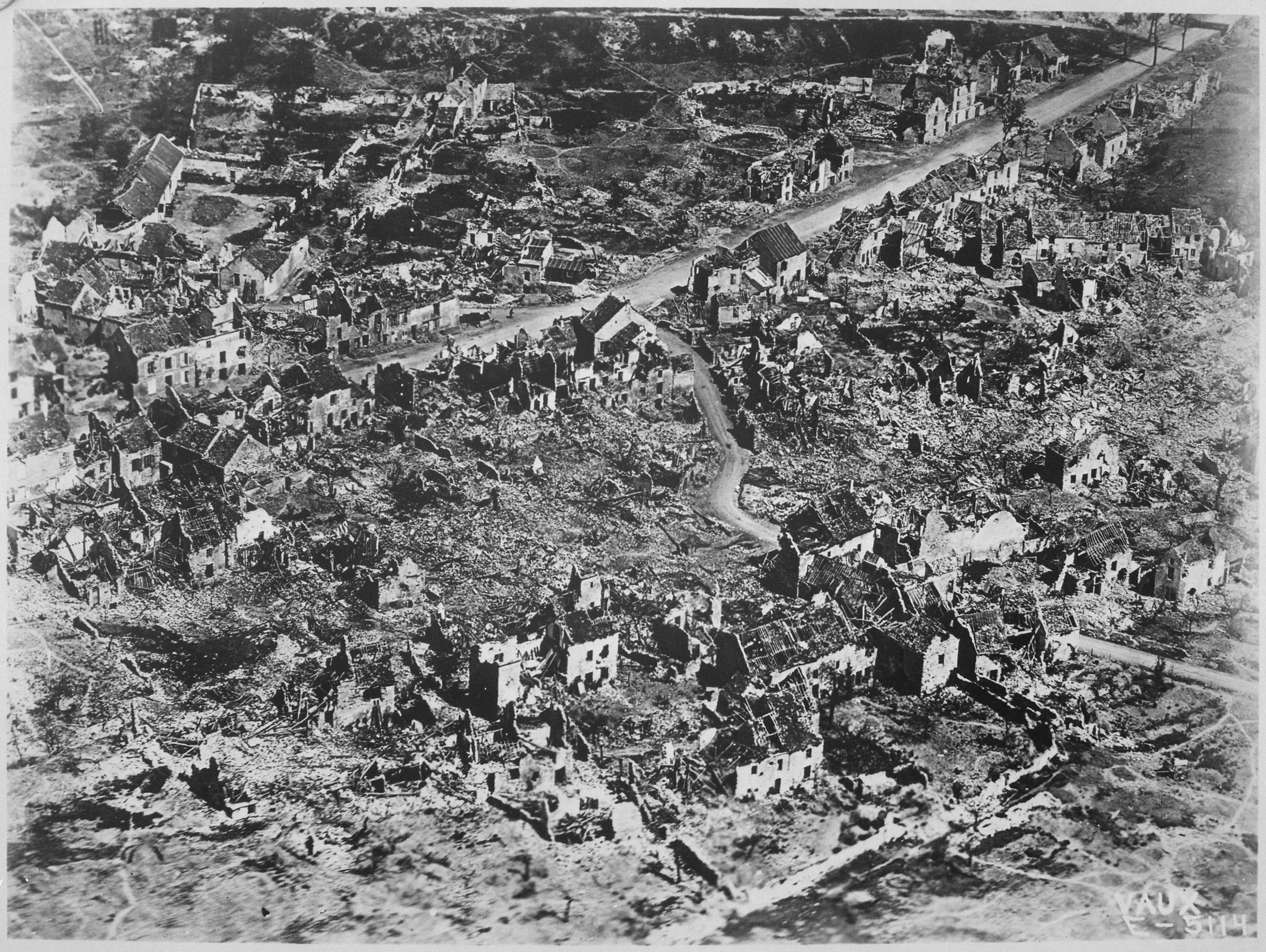
The loss of life and harms of war are cited as a reason for the illegality of aggression. Pictured: aerial view of the ruins of Vaux, France, 1918.

After World War I, the prosecution of Kaiser Wilhelm II for aggression was proposed by the United Kingdom and France. In a speech on 11 November 1918, British Prime Minister David Lloyd George cited the loss of "the lives of millions of the best young men in Europe" and "the outrage upon international law which is involved in invading the territory of an independent country without its consent" as a crime for which someone should be held responsible. The proposed prosecution met with disapproval from the judiciary and was rejected by the United States.

Instead, the League of Nations had the mandate of maintaining international peace. Interwar treaties criminalizing aggression were proposed but not ratified, and there was no progress towards the criminalization of aggression. Aggressive war became progressively delegitimized but was not considered illegal under international customary law. Although the 1928 Kellogg–Briand Pact did not contain any suggestion that war was criminal, it was cited as a precedent for the prosecution of German and Japanese leaders for waging aggressive wars after World War II.

=== World War II ===
Invasions during World War II led to new thinking on aggression. Soviet criminologist Aron Naumovich Trainin developed the ideas that were used to criminalize aggressive war, although he did not attract international attention until 1943. Others making similar proposals included Hersch Lauterpacht, Marcel de Baer, and Bohuslav Ečer. Trainin argued that although material and political responsibility rested with the state, criminal responsibility for aggressive war was vested in the individuals exercising authority. He blamed Adolf Hitler, his cabinet, government officials, the Nazi Party and German industrialists for acts of aggression against the Soviet Union, which he described as "the most heinous crime". The governments-in-exile represented in the London International Assembly lobbied for a formal international tribunal with jurisdiction over acts of aggression. In 1944, Trainin proposed that the Nazi leaders could be dealt with either with a tribunal or by "the political verdict of the victorious democratic States". At the time, the Soviet Union still perceived itself as vulnerable to international aggression, which motivated its interest in criminalizing aggression.

Although there was not much in the way of international criminal law to work from, the United States Department of War put together the legal framework for the Nuremberg trials in ten months. Some prominent United States policymakers thought that execution without trial compromised the principles of the Allies and that formal trials before an international court would lend legitimacy. At the London Conference of 1945, the victorious Allies decided to criminalize aggression and try their vanquished enemies although at the conference doubts were raised that wars of aggression were illegal under customary law. Both the Soviet Union, which invaded the Baltic States and Poland according to the secret protocols of the German–Soviet pact, and Western countries, which had planned an invasion of Norway, were aware that they could also be accused of acts of aggression and so they limited the definition of crimes against peace to the actions of their defeated enemies during World War II.

== Case law ==
Almost all the trials for crimes against peace took place between November 1945 and November 1948, though in some cases such as Romania they extended into 1949; no one has been prosecuted for aggression before or since. The courts faced the challenge, first of proving the criminality of acts of aggression, and secondly in tying such acts to individuals.

=== War-responsibility trials in Finland ===
In 1939, the Soviet Union invaded Finland, leading to a peace treaty on unfavorable terms in 1940. During the Continuation War, Finland managed to retake its ceded territory and progressed further to the areas of Soviet Union that had never been part of Finland. In 1944, the war turned against Finland, which signed an armistice on even less favorable terms. The Allied Control Commission in Finland insisted on holding trials for aggression during the second war, as the armistice had required Finnish cooperation in trying those accused of war crimes. The law establishing the tribunal established criminal responsibility for those who "in a significant manner contributed in Finland's engagement in the war...or prevented peace" between 1941 and 1944. Eight men were tried; wartime president Risto Ryti, six members of the cabinet, and the Finnish ambassador to Germany, but not any generals. Unlike other specifications of the crimes against peace, the Finnish trials charged those who joined the government after 1941 and rejected peace offers from the Soviet Union. Initially seven were convicted and the ambassador was acquitted; the judgement was revised to convict all the defendants with harsher penalties, up to ten years imprisonment with hard labor. The convicts were treated leniently in prison and all were released by 1949.

=== International Military Tribunal ===
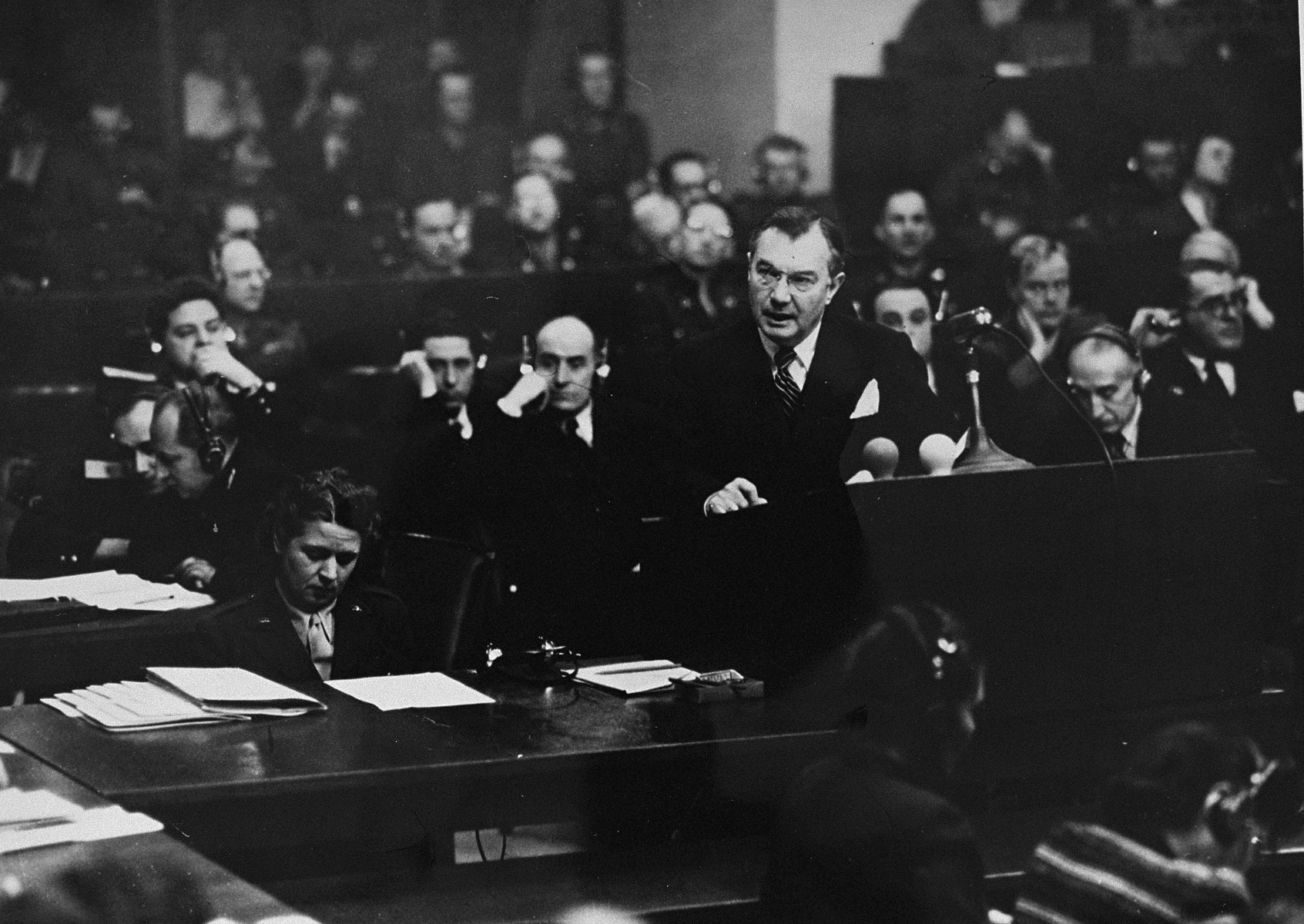
Chief prosecutor Robert H. Jackson (on the pulpit)

The Nuremberg Charter defined crimes against peace as

planning, preparation, initiation or waging of a war of aggression, or a war in violation of international treaties, agreements or assurances, or participation in a common plan or conspiracy for the accomplishment of any of the foregoing.

The International Military Tribunal agreed with the prosecution that aggression was the gravest charge against the accused, stating in its judgement that because war in general is evil, "To initiate a war of aggression, therefore, is not only an international crime; it is the supreme international crime differing only from other war crimes in that it contains within itself the accumulated evil of the whole." These words, originally written in a letter by British judge Robert Wright, have been widely quoted. The judgement found that there was a premeditated conspiracy to commit crimes against peace, whose goals were "the disruption of the European order as it had existed since the Treaty of Versailles" and "the creation of a Greater Germany beyond the frontiers of 1914".

The planning of aggression was traced to Hitler's 1925 book Mein Kampf and specific secret meetings held on 5 November 1937, 23 May 1939, 22 August 1939, and 23 November 1939. The court considered the planning of acts of aggression against Austria and Czechoslovakia, as well as wars of aggressions against Poland, Denmark and Norway, Belgium, the Netherlands and Luxembourg, Yugoslavia, Greece, and the Soviet Union, as well as the declaration of war on the United States and prior encouragement of Japanese aggression against the United States. Although the court did not rule on acts of aggression short of war, it does not preclude the criminality of aggression for less large-scale actions than World War II.

All 22 defendants were charged with crimes against peace, and 12 were convicted: Hermann Göring, Rudolf Hess, Joachim von Ribbentrop, Wilhelm Keitel, Alfred Rosenberg, Wilhelm Frick, Walther Funk, Karl Dönitz, Erich Raeder, Alfred Jodl, Arthur Seyss-Inquart, and Konstantin von Neurath. The Nuremberg verdict was groundbreaking, establishing international criminal law and rejecting that act of state doctrine granted immunity for such serious crimes. The defendants were prosecuted even for acts that were legal under domestic law. Opinion on the Nuremberg trials was divided. While some heralded it as a breakthrough in international law, crimes against peace specifically were subject to criticism as ex post facto law.

=== Nuremberg Military Tribunals ===
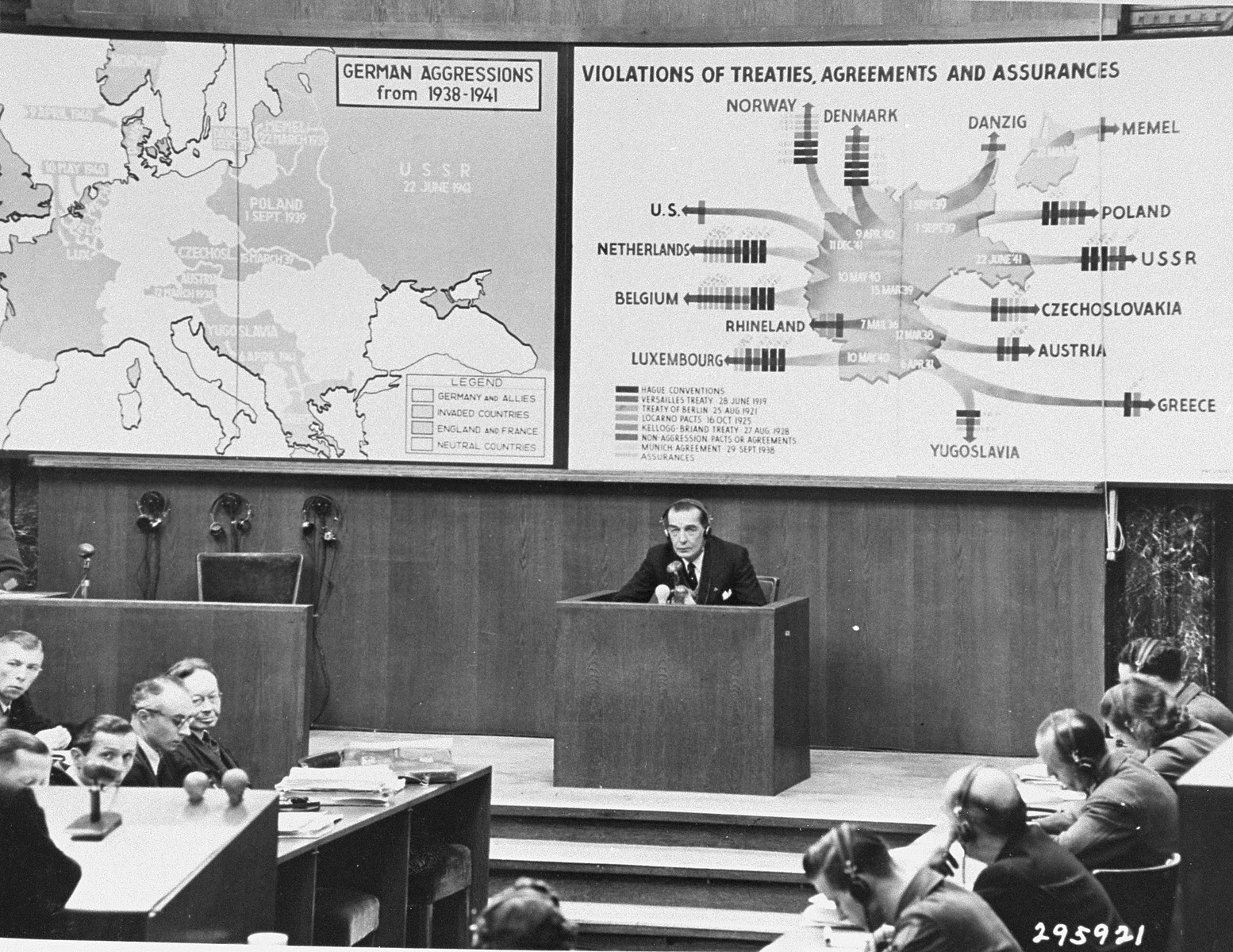
Theodor von Hornbostel testifies for the prosecution during the Ministries trial, giving evidence for aggression

The Nuremberg Military Tribunals were based on Law No. 10, which defined aggression as follows:

Initiation of invasions of other countries and wars of aggression in violation of international laws and treaties, including but not limited to planning, preparation, initiation or waging a war of aggression, or a war of violation of international treaties, agreements or assurances, or participation in a common plan or conspiracy for the accomplishment of any of the foregoing.

The main Nuremberg trial only considered the conspiracy to commit crimes against peace against Austria and Czechoslovakia, ruling that these relatively bloodless invasions were not wars of aggression. The slightly different wording of the offense in Law No. 10 allowed the invasions of these countries to be counted as substantive crimes against peace, and ultimately two defendants were convicted for their role in these invasions. Chief prosecutor Telford Taylor was skeptical about prosecuting aggression, but ultimately charged defendants in four of the subsequent Nuremberg trials: the IG Farben trial, Krupp trial, High Command trial, and Ministries trial. Of 66 defendants charged with aggression, only three were convicted (Hans Lammers, Wilhelm Keppler, and Paul Koerner), all of them during the Ministries trial. Nevertheless, the trials helped clarify the scope of aggression as a criminal offense, defining its four necessary elements as "a state act of aggression; sufficient authority to satisfy the leadership requirement; participation in the planning, preparing, initiating or waging of the aggressive act; and mens rea".

=== International Military Tribunal for the Far East ===
The Tokyo Charter defined crimes against peace as

the planning, preparation, initiation or waging of a declared or undeclared war of aggression, or a war in violation of international law, treaties, agreements or assurances, or participation in a common plan or conspiracy for the accomplishment of any of the foregoing.

The charge of aggression was central to the trial; 36 out of 55 counts were for crimes against peace. The judgement in the Tokyo Trial was three times longer than the Nuremberg judgement, making it a valuable source of case law on aggression. The majority of the judges followed the Nuremberg interpretation of crimes against peace, but two judges – Radhabinod Pal from India and Bert Röling of the Netherlands – dissented against the prosecution of crimes against peace. The prosecution used conspiracy to file more charges as each member of a conspiracy was held responsible for all others acting in the same conspiracy. All of the conspiracy charges related to crimes against peace alleged that the conspiracy sought to "secure military, naval, political and economic domination of East Asia and of the Pacific and Indian Oceans, and of all countries and islands therein and bordering thereon" by "wag[ing] declared or undeclared war or wars of aggression, and war or wars in violation of international law, treaties, agreements and assurances, against any country or countries which might oppose that purpose." The conspiracy charges were partly successful as the judges accepted that there was a joint conspiracy to wage aggressive war from 1928 to 1945.

The judgement summarizes the rise of Japanese militarism in the 1930s leading up to the Conference of 11 August 1936 in which an expansionist policy was decided. In 1937, Japan invaded China and in 1938–1939 it prepared for war with the Soviet Union.

=== Romania ===
The 1947 treaty of peace with Romania obliged the country to apprehend and bring to trial people accused of "war crimes and crimes against peace and humanity". Consequently, on 18 August 1947, Romania issued its "Law for the Prosecution and Punishment of Those Guilty of War Crimes or Crimes against Peace or Humanity". At least 8 members of the wartime government of Ion Antonescu were sentenced in 1949 for crimes against peace, although one of them was rehabilitated by the Romanian Supreme Court on 26 October 1998. Another Romanian sentenced for crimes against peace – Gheron Netta, Ion Antonescu's last finance minister (1 April to 23 August 1944) – was rehabilitated by the Supreme Court on 17 January 2000.

=== Other trials ===
Arthur Greiser, a Nazi leader in Danzig and later Gauleiter in the Warthegau region annexed from Poland, was tried and convicted by a Polish court in 1946 for aggression among other charges. Historian Catherine Epstein states that the evidence that Greiser had participated in a conspiracy to wage aggressive war is weak or nonexistent. According to Mark A. Drumbl, he would probably not be convicted according to the Rome Statute definition of aggression.

In 1946, former Japanese general Takashi Sakai was tried by a Chinese court for aggression, convicted, and executed. Sakai appears to have been responsible for carrying out policies designed by others, which would put him outside the Rome Statute definition of aggression. According to jurist Roger S. Clark, he probably would not have been convicted for crimes against peace if tried at the Tokyo trial.

== Development in the United Nations ==
On 11 December 1946, the United Nations General Assembly passed a resolution affirming the criminality of "waging aggressive war" and stating that it was not just the aggression of the Axis powers that was a crime, but aggression in general. Crimes against peace, devised by the Allies as a temporary solution, soon exhausted their usefulness and were abandoned by 1950. In the early 1950s, attempts to codify the crime of aggression in a "Code of Offences Against the Peace and Security of Mankind" stalled. After the 1940s, other crimes against international law, especially genocide and crimes against humanity, took priority over aggression.

Maintenance of international peace and stability is a major function of the international order, and the Charter of the United Nations prohibits acts of aggression against other states. The prohibition of aggression is considered a peremptory norm in customary law, such that it is binding on states that are not members of the United Nations. The most important provision in the UN Charter is Article 2(4): "All Members shall refrain in their international relations from the threat or use of force against the territorial integrity or political independence of any state, or in any other manner inconsistent with the Purposes of the United Nations." "Force" refers to armed or military force, defined broadly: it can refer to conventional armies or irregular forces. Although not explicitly stated in the UN Charter, the conventional view is that only state actors can commit aggression. Although self-defense is an exception to the prohibition of force, claims of preventive self-defense are largely rejected, while claims of pre-emptive self defense are "more well-founded".

On 14 December 1974, United Nations General Assembly Resolution 3314 elaborated on the prohibition of the use of force in the UN Charter. Although not legally binding, it influenced the Rome Statute's definition of aggression. Resolution 3314 generally defines aggression as "the use of armed force by a State against the sovereignty, territorial integrity or political independence of another State, or in any other manner inconsistent with the Charter of the United Nations, as set out in this Definition". It includes an incomplete list of acts of aggression and confirms that aggression are committed by one state against another, excluding non-state actors. The resolution also refers to "crime of aggression" and makes it clear that there is individual criminal liability for aggression.

== Customary law ==
It is generally agreed by scholars of international criminal law that the crime of aggression is part of international customary law, but there is no agreement on the exact scope of aggression that is covered in customary law. This threshold is probably high, in order to distinguish criminal aggression from other acts of aggression. According to Antonio Cassese, the customary criminalization of aggression covers "planning, or organizing, or preparing, or participating in the first use of armed force by a State against the territorial integrity and political independence of another State in contravention of the UN Charter, provided the acts of aggression concerned have large-scale and serious consequences". Gerhard Werle and Florian Jessberger argue that wars of aggression are criminalized under customary law, but not acts of aggression falling short of war. Others argue for a broader conception, including other acts of aggression that have broad-ranging and severe consequences.

Aggression requires both a mens rea and actus reus. In terms of mens rea, Israeli jurist Yoram Dinstein argues that aggression can only be committed by a few high state officials who decide to wage aggressive war, and any subordinates who know in advance that their plans will be used to wage an aggressive war. Other jurists require a special intent, in the form of seeking to "achieve territorial gains, or to obtain economic advantages, or to interfere with the internal affairs" of the state that is aggressed.

== National law ==
After 1948, many states passed statute law criminalizing aggression, with different variations in prohibited conduct. Dinstein has argued that national prosecutions for aggression are undesirable as "the nature of crimes against peace is such that no domestic proceedings can conceivably dispel doubts regarding the impartiality of the judges." Aggression can be tried under universal jurisdiction.

== Rome Statute ==
In 1998, at the Rome Conference that adopted the Rome Statute of the International Criminal Court ("the Statute"), the crime was included as one of the crimes within the jurisdiction of the Court (Article 5.1) and over which any State that becomes party to the Statute accepts the Court's jurisdiction (Article 12.1). Participants to the Rome Conference could not agree on the definition of the crime nor on further conditions for the Court's exercise of jurisdiction; the Statute did not allow the Court to exercise such jurisdiction until these outstanding issues were solved (Article 5.2). At the 2010 Review Conference ("the Conference"), States Parties agreed by consensus to adopt resolution RC/Res.6 accepting the amendments to the Statute adding the definition of the crime and the conditions for the exercise of jurisdiction over this crime. Aggression is one of the core crimes in international criminal law, alongside genocide, crimes against humanity, and war crimes.

=== Definition of aggression ===
Under the Rome Statute, as amended in the 2010 Kampala Review Conference, the crime of aggression "means the planning, preparation, initiation or execution, by a person in a position effectively to exercise control over or to direct the political or military action of a State, of an act of aggression which, by its character, gravity and scale, constitutes a manifest violation of the Charter of the United Nations". The criminal prosecution of aggression is limited to the most serious acts of state aggression; non-state aggression, an even more disputed concept, is excluded. The Rome Statute also restricts the crime of aggression to leaders of a state who have the power to determine a state's policy, excluding even high-ranking officials or generals who carry out a war of aggression.

Thus, the crime of aggression is distinguished from the act of aggression, defined in the Rome Statute by the amendments of the 2010 Kampala Review Conference as follows:

2. For the purpose of paragraph 1, "act of aggression" means the use of armed force by a State against the sovereignty, territorial integrity or political independence of another State, or in any other manner inconsistent with the Charter of the United Nations. Any of the following acts, regardless of a declaration of war, shall, in accordance with United Nations General Assembly resolution 3314 (XXIX) of 14 December 1974, qualify as an act of aggression:

(a) The invasion or attack by the armed forces of a State of the territory of another State, or any military occupation, however temporary, resulting from such invasion or attack, or any annexation by the use of force of the territory of another State or part thereof;
(b) Bombardment by the armed forces of a State against the territory of another State or the use of any weapons by a State against the territory of another State;
(c) The blockade of the ports or coasts of a State by the armed forces of another State;
(d) An attack by the armed forces of a State on the land, sea or air forces, or marine and air fleets of another State;
(e) The use of armed forces of one State which are within the territory of another State with the agreement of the receiving State, in contravention of the conditions provided for in the agreement or any extension of their presence in such territory beyond the termination of the agreement;
(f) The action of a State in allowing its territory, which it has placed at the disposal of another State, to be used by that other State for perpetrating an act of aggression against a third State;
(g) The sending by or on behalf of a State of armed bands, groups, irregulars or mercenaries, which carry out acts of armed force against another State of such gravity as to amount to the acts listed above, or its substantial involvement therein.

— Kampala Review Conference, 11 June 2010

The list of prohibited acts is exhaustive.

=== Jurisdiction ===
The International Criminal Court may only prosecute an act of aggression if the aggressing state has accepted its jurisdiction over the crime of aggression, or following a referral from the Security Council. Critics argue that the ICC should not prosecute aggression; a prominent criticism is that justified war is a political determination, and the involvement of a court in such a matter could compromise its legitimacy. A prosecution by the ICC is unlikely because of the narrow scope of the crime and limited jurisdiction.

The ICC's jurisdiction over aggression was activated on 17 July 2018 after a decision by two-thirds of states parties. As of 17 March 2022, 43 State Parties have ratified or acceded to the amendments on the crime of aggression to the Rome Statute.

== State- versus human-rights-centric approaches to aggression ==
Wars of aggression entail "legally unjustified killing that is otherwise anomalously non-criminal at both the international and national levels: the killing of combatants and proportionate collateral civilians through a manifestly illegal use of international force". The standard view is that aggression is a crime against the state that is attacked. The Rome Statute definition of aggression does not technically require harm to individuals, but the relatively bloodless invasion of the Czech lands in 1939 was not prosecuted at Nuremberg. Some severe violations of state sovereignty (such as foreign electoral interference aiming at regime change) are not criminalized as aggression, while lesser infringements involving military force can be criminalized. It is debatable whether prohibiting aggression protects state sovereignty or circumscribes it. Others see aggression as a crime primarily against individuals who are killed or harmed as a result of war.

Philosopher Larry May maintains that serious aggressions, entailing loss of life, can be subsumed under the category of crimes against humanity. Conversely, a war cannot be justified by a minor violation of territorial integrity, and a violation of territorial integrity that does not involve serious human rights violations cannot be considered a criminal act of aggression. This conception of aggression could also allow for humanitarian intervention.

The traditional view is that only decision-makers can be held criminally responsible for aggression, rather than lower-level military personnel and ordinary soldiers. In recent times, some have considered whether soldiers who knowingly participate in a war of aggression incur moral or should incur legal liability. Soldiers have a right and a responsibility to refuse to commit war crimes, but in general the right to refuse to fight an illegal war is not recognized. International law scholar Tom Dannenbaum argues that soldiers should have a right not to fight in illegal wars, and those who refuse to do so should be recognized as refugees.

One controversial issue is whether waging aggressive war inherently violates the right to life guaranteed in international human rights law. In 2019, the United Nations Human Rights Committee ruled that "States parties engaged in acts of aggression as defined in international law, resulting in deprivation of life, violate ipso facto article 6 [the right to life] of the" International Covenant on Civil and Political Rights.

== See also ==
- International Day of Innocent Children Victims of Aggression
- Forced displacement
- Ethnic cleansing
- Reprisal

== Sources ==
- Clark, Roger S. (2013). "The Crime of Aggression: From the Trial of Takashi Sakai, August 1946, to the Kampala Review Conference on the ICC in 2010". The Hidden Histories of War Crimes Trials. Oxford University Press. ISBN 978-0-19-967114-4.
- Cohen, David; Totani, Yuma (2020). The Tokyo War Crimes Tribunal: Law, History, and Jurisprudence. Cambridge University Press. ISBN 978-1-108-82068-4.
- Dannenbaum, Tom (2018). "The Criminalization of Aggression and Soldiers' Rights". European Journal of International Law. 29 (3): 859–886. doi:10.1093/ejil/chy054.
- Drumbl, Mark A. (2013). "'Germans are the Lords and Poles are the Servants': The Trial of Arthur Greiser in Poland, 1946". The Hidden Histories of War Crimes Trials. Oxford University Press. ISBN 978-0-19-967114-4.
- Heller, Kevin Jon (2011). The Nuremberg Military Tribunals and the Origins of International Criminal Law. Oxford University Press. ISBN 978-0-19-955431-7.
- Kemp, Gerhard (2010). Individual Criminal Liability for the International Crime of Aggression. Intersentia. ISBN 978-94-000-0013-1.
- May, Larry (2016). "Just War Theory and the Crime of Aggression". In Kreß, Claus; Barriga, Stefan (eds.). The Crime of Aggression: A Commentary. Cambridge University Press. pp. 273–286. ISBN 978-1-107-01526-5.
- Sayapin, Sergey (2014). The Crime of Aggression in International Criminal Law: Historical Development, Comparative Analysis and Present State. T.M.C. Asser Press. ISBN 978-90-6704-927-6.
- Sellars, Kirsten (2013). 'Crimes Against Peace' and International Law. Cambridge University Press. ISBN 978-1-107-02884-5.
- Soler, Christopher (2019). The Global Prosecution of Core Crimes under International Law. T.M.C. Asser Press. ISBN 978-94-6265-335-1.
- Tallgren, Immi (2013). "The Finnish War-Responsibility Trial in 1945–6: The Limits of Ad Hoc Criminal Justice?". The Hidden Histories of War Crimes Trials. Oxford University Press. ISBN 978-0-19-967114-4.
