= Kampala Conference to review the Rome Statute =

A Review Conference of the Rome Statute took place from 31 May to 11 June 2010, in Kampala, Uganda, to consider amendments to the Rome Statute of the International Criminal Court. The Rome Statute established the International Criminal Court in 2002 as a permanent tribunal to prosecute individuals accused of the most serious crimes of international concern, and provided that a review conference be held seven years after the entry into force.

The Review Conference of the Rome Statute, adopted the main amendment via Resolution RC/Res.6, circulated under depositary notification C.N.651.2010.TREATIES-8 on November 29, 2010.

== Scope ==
The Review Conference considered amendments to the Rome Statute and the Statute made specific reference to reviewing the list of crimes within the court's jurisdiction. The final resolution when the Rome Statute was signed specifically recommended that the review should reconsider including drug trafficking and terrorism in the list of crimes, and also agreeing on a definition of crimes of aggression so that the court can exercise its jurisdiction over this crime.

Two amendments to the Rome Statute of the International Criminal Court were adopted. The first one is to extend the jurisdiction of the Court over some war crimes committed in non-international conflicts for which it already had jurisdiction if committed in international conflicts. The second one defines the crime of aggression and lays out conditions for the jurisdiction of the Court to be in force.

The transitional provision of Article 124 regarding the war crimes opt-out was also discussed at the review conference, but it was decided to retain it for the time being.

There was some disagreement as to whether the amendment relating to the definition of the crime of aggression needs ratification by seven eighths of the states parties (as a change of institutional provisions would) to enter into force or if it comes only in force for those countries that have ratified it (as a change of crime provisions would and as the amendment itself puts it). With the latter view prevailing, the United Nations Security Council could also refer to the Court a situation regarding a crime of aggression allegedly committed by a national of a non-state party.

== Proposals ==
=== General Assembly ===
The Assembly of States Parties (ASP) is the management oversight and legislative body of the International Criminal Court.

In November 2009, South Africa floated a proposal at the ASP that the power of the UN Security Council to defer an investigation should also be given to the UN General Assembly. This followed the African Union's unsuccessful attempt to defer the investigation in Darfur.

=== Drug trafficking ===
In September 2007, Trinidad and Tobago specifically called for drug trafficking to be included in the list of crimes.

=== Targeting of journalists ===
The British television media company ITN wrote to the UK government in 2007 asking them to support an amendment to the definition of war crimes to include the intentional targeting of journalists.

== Resolutions ==
The Review Conference of the Rome Statute, concluded with the adoption of six key resolutions.

The adoption of these resolutions was the result of an intensive negotiation process that took place throughout the conference. While some drafts had been discussed in previous sessions of the Assembly of States Parties, dedicated groups were established in Kampala—most notably the Working Group on the Crime of Aggression and the Working Group on Other Amendments—to refine the final legal texts and resolve last-minute disagreements. Although the resolutions were adopted on different dates as consensus was reached, they collectively represent the "Kampala Package," a historic milestone in the development of international criminal law.

The following table summarizes the resolutions adopted during the final plenary sessions:

Resolutions adopted
Resolution	Title	Date of Adoption
RC/Res.1	Complementarity	8 June 2010
RC/Res.2	The impact of the Rome Statute system on victims and affected communities	8 June 2010
RC/Res.3	Strengthening the enforcement of sentences	8 June 2010
RC/Res.4	Article 124 of the Rome Statute	10 June 2010
RC/Res.5	Amendments to article 8 of the Rome Statute	10 June 2010
RC/Res.6	The crime of aggression	11 June 2010

While the conference began on May 31, legal adoptions only occurred during the final plenary sessions once consensus was reached.

== Other reforms of the Rome Statute ==
A summary of the most important reforms, after Kampala (2015 – 2019):

- Article 124 (2015): removed the clause allowing states to avoid war crime trials for 7 years, amendment adopted at the 14th ASP.
- New Weapons (2017): banned biological weapons, blinding lasers, and undetectable fragments, adopted at the 16th ASP by Resolution ICC-ASP/16/Res.4.
- Starvation (2019): classified using starvation against civilians in internal conflicts as a war crime, Adopted at the18th ASP by Resolution ICC-ASP/18/Res.5.

== See also ==
- United Nations:
  - United Nations Document Codes
  - United Nations Official Document System
  - United Nations Treaty Series
