= International Day of Innocent Children Victims of Aggression =

International observance, 4 June

- Date: 4 June
- Next time: 4 June 2026
- Frequency: annual
- First time: 4 June 2011

International Day of Innocent Children Victims of Aggression is a United Nations observance held on June 4 every year. It was established on 19 August 1982.

Originally focused on victims of the 1982 Lebanon War, its purpose expanded to "acknowledge the pain suffered by children throughout the world who are the victims of physical, mental and emotional abuse. This day affirms the UN's commitment to protecting the rights of children."

== UN Resolution E-7/8. International Day of Innocent Children Victims of Aggression ==
The General Assembly on its 31st plenary meeting on 19 August 1982, having considered the question of Palestine at its resumed seventh emergency special session, "appalled at the great number of innocent Palestinian and Lebanese children victims of Israel's acts of aggression", decided to commemorate 4 June of each year as the International Day of Innocent Children Victims of Aggression.

== See also ==
- 1982 Lebanon War

Russian invasion of Ukraine

- Israeli–Palestinian conflict
- Civilian casualties
- Crime of aggression
