= Aron Trainin =

Soviet jurist (1883–1957)

- Арон Трайнин
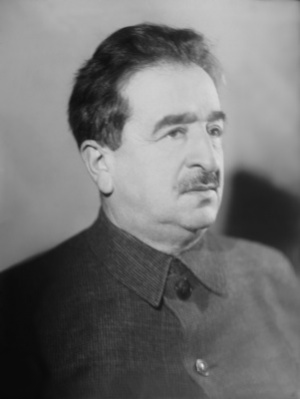
- Trainin in the 1920s
- Born: 26 June [O.S. July 8] 1883; Vitebsk, Russian Empire
- Died: 7 February 1957 (aged 73); Moscow, Russian SFSR, Soviet Union
- Education: Moscow State University
- Occupations: Jurist; criminologist
- Political party: CPSU
- Awards: Order of the Red Banner of Labour; Medal "For Valiant Labour in the Great Patriotic War 1941–1945"

Aron Naumovich Trainin (Russian: Арон Наумович Трайнин), also known as Moshe Aron Naumovich Trainin (Russian: Мовша-Арон Наумович Трайнин), or Moshe Aron Nahimovich Trainin (Russian: Мовша-Арон Нохимович Трайнин; 26 June [O.S. July 8] 1883 – 7 February 1957), was a Soviet jurist and criminologist.

== Early life and career ==
Trainin was born in a Jewish family and attended the gymnasium of Kaluga, graduating in 1903, the same year he matriculated to Moscow State University (MGU), where he graduated in 1908. During his university years, he participated in the студе́нчество, "studénčestvo", student activist movement, during the pivotal, though failed, 1905 Russian Revolution.

After graduation, Trainin worked in the MGU Department of Criminal Law, on track for a professorship, but he would resign his position in 1912 in connection with the "Kasso Case", in which a great many academics resigned out of solidarity with the targets of Imperial Education Minister Lev Aristidovich Kasso. From 1912 to 1918 he taught at the Shanyavsky Moscow City People's University in Moscow.

From 1916 to 1917, he was an editor of the Jewish newspaper titled New Way. He was a founding member of the Moscow chapter of the Political Red Cross, which was formed in 1918.

Trainin came to prominence in the inter-war years as critical of the League of Nations for not doing enough to prosecute those who waged war against peace. Scholars Francine Hirsch of the University of Wisconsin–Madison, Kirsten Sellars of the National University of Singapore, and Michelle Jean Penn of the University of Colorado Boulder credit him with establishing the international legal concept of "crimes against peace".

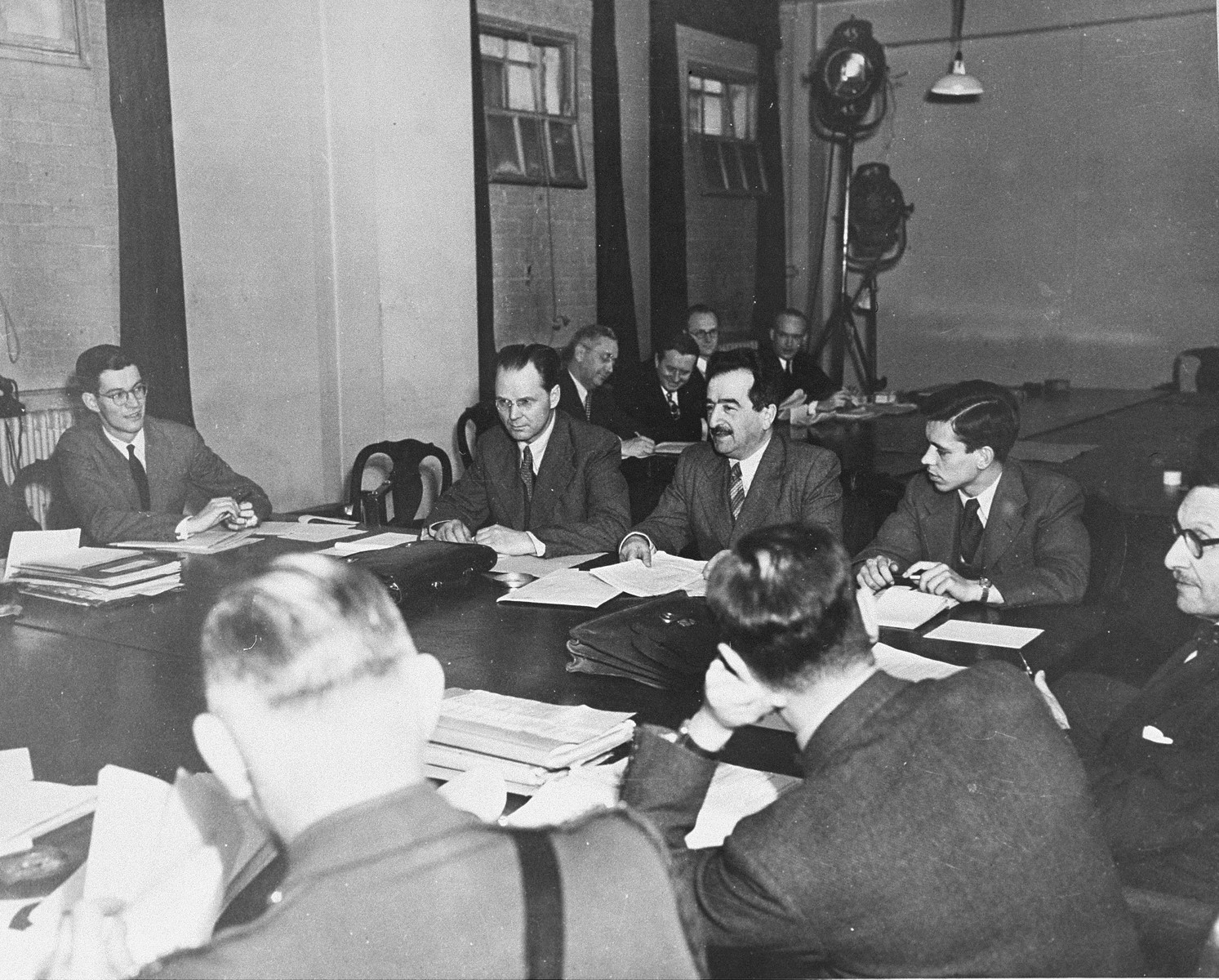
Trainin speaks in London in August 1945 at the Nüremberg Tribunals War Crimes Executive Committee.

In 1937, Trainin published his 'The Defense of Peace and Criminal Law' in which he castigated the League of Nations for failing to make aggressive war a criminal offense and not providing for any sort of international court to punish aggressors. Along with Major-General Iona Timofeevich Nikitchenko, who also served as a judge, Trainin was a signatory for the Soviet Union to the charter of the Allies of World War II War Crimes Executive Committee which established the Nüremberg International Military Tribunal for "the prosecution and punishment of the major war criminals of the European Axis", known in Russian as the "London Agreement", 'Лондонском соглашении'.

Trainin played a central role in establishing the legal framework for the Nuremberg Trials. He proposed that a new legal concept, "the crime of aggression", be used to hold Nazi Germany's military and political leadership accountable for the numerous countries they invaded and occupied. Along with the other jurists involved in crafting the Nuremberg Charter, Trainin was influential in establishing the new legal field of international law. Despite this foundational role, his contributions are often ignored or forgotten by Western scholars, largely as a result of Cold War perceptions of the Soviet Union. More recent scholarship has begun to acknowledge the influence of Soviet legal thought on international law, arguing that Trainin's contributions must be taken seriously, alongside an ongoing recognition of the crimes of the Soviet regime.

Trainin later became a Corresponding member of the Academy of Sciences of the USSR (1946). In 1947 and 1948 he served as vice-president of the International Association of Democratic Lawyers. His major works were On Complicity (1941) and Elements of a Crime According to Soviet Criminal Law (1951).

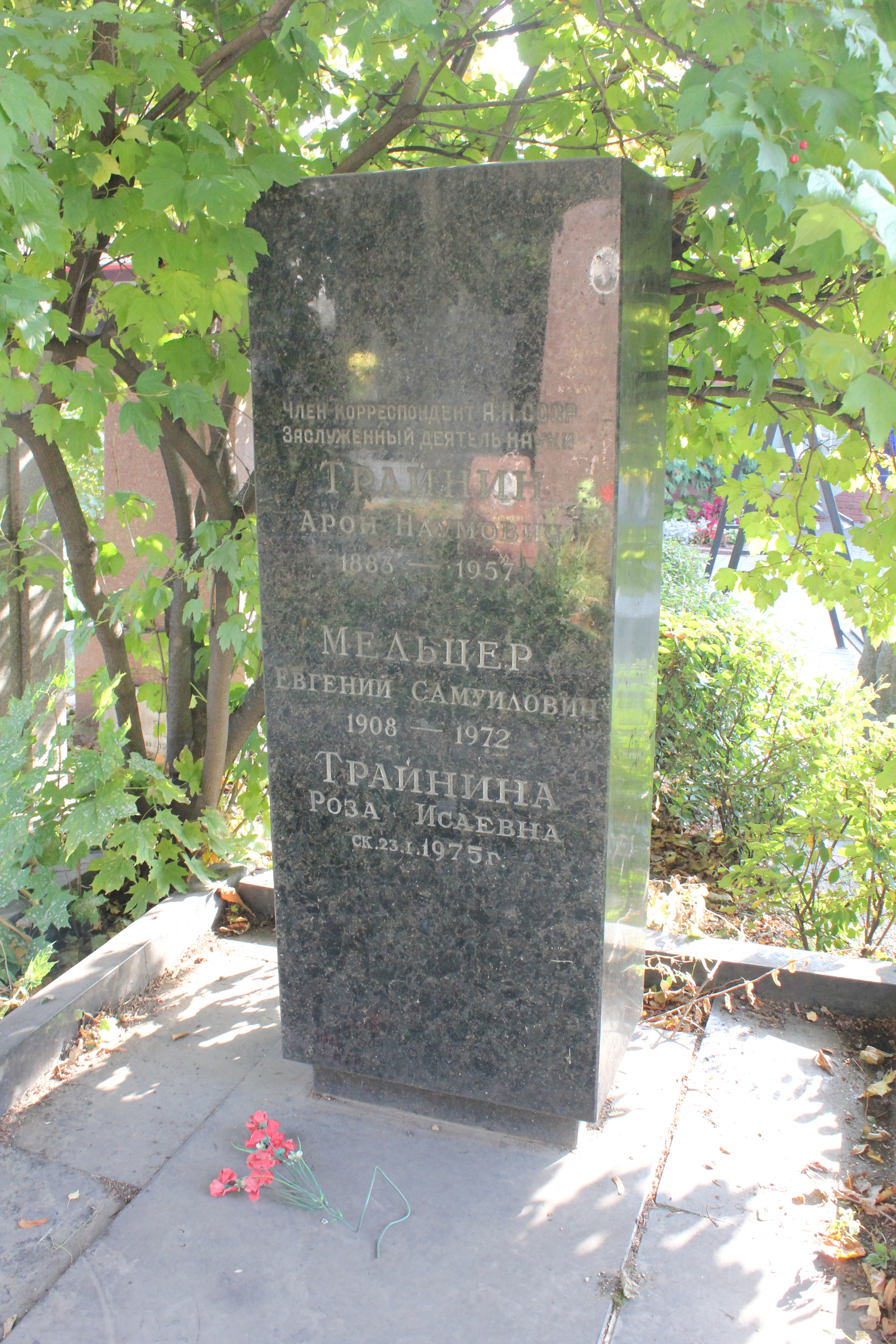
Grave of Aron Trainin at the Novodevichy Cemetery

In 1945, in Fundamental Principles of Soviet Criminal Law, he wrote,

Soviet law combines formal definition of crime with material definition of it. Soviet law defines crime as an act of commission (or omission) dangerous to the community, transgressing the foundations of the Soviet System or Socialist law and order (material feature) and entailing punishment by law (formal feature).

Trainin was awarded two Orders of the Red Banner of Labor.

== See also ==
- History of the Jews in the Soviet Union
