= United Nations Document Codes =

United Nations documentation symbols

The United Nations issues most of its official documents in its six working languages: Arabic, Chinese, English, French, Russian and Spanish. Many are also issued in German, which in 1973 gained the status of "documentation language" and has its own translation unit at the UN. The official documents are published under the United Nations masthead and each is identified by a unique document code (symbol) for reference, indicating the organ to which it is linked and a sequential number. There are also sales publications with distinctive symbols representing subject categories, as well as press releases and other public information materials, only some of which appear in all the official languages.

A definitive list of United Nations documentation symbols is published and periodically updated by the United Nations Library. With the addition of new bodies and functions, the documentation scheme evolves to keep pace.

== Online access to documents and consolidation ==
In 2001 the United Nations transferred its platform for electronic storage and distribution of documents, in operation since 1991, from internal accessibility to Web-based access. The revised system, to enable unrestricted public access over the Internet, was called the Official Document System (ODS).

Parallel development of an Integrated Library Management System, to facilitate indexing of documents with links to ODS, was delayed until 2002 by budget cuts.

In 2004 the project to digitize older archived documents and upload them in electronic form was under way and ready to be made available once the system was opened up to the public at large. In 2007 the need for a proper content management system was recognized as a long-term solution. Since 2007, the global Making Commitments Matter Initiative is concerned with the creation of a searchable database of UN resolutions and conventions (UN-informed.org).

The United Nations maintains several online consolidation (legislation) systems for international law (treaties, legislation, sanctions lists), and specific areas of national legislation, though it does not consolidate all national laws of all member states into one single repository. National laws are essential for comparative legal studies and for monitoring a State's compliance with the international instruments it has ratified.

== Elements ==
While United Nations bodies share many of the same procedures, the code numbers for their sessions are usually incompatible due to the date of establishment of the body and the different timing of their session transitions. For example, the General Assembly began operation in 1947 with its session number incrementing in September every year, while the Security Council is permanently in session, so its meetings are numbered consecutively from its first sitting at its foundation.

=== First letter ===
There are four primary document producing bodies which print documents under the mast-head of the United Nations. Other bodies, such as the World Health Organization, have their own sets of codes which are sometimes similar in nature but have a different heading at the top of the page.

A/ - United Nations General Assembly

A/C.3 - Third Main Committee of the United Nations General Assembly

S/ - United Nations Security Council
ST/ - United Nations Secretariat
E/ - United Nations Economic and Social Council

=== Middle codes ===
- /RES/ – A resolution of the body
- /PV.67/ – A full, first-person account of the proceedings of the 67th meeting (of the year, or since the start of the UN) known as a "proces verbal" or "Verbatim record".
- /SR.67/ – A third-person condensed version of the above meeting, known as the "Summary record".
- /L.45/ – Document which has limited distribution, usually a draft resolution before it is voted on and reprinted in its final form.
- /ES-10/ – A "meeting" of the Tenth 'emergency special session'.

=== Trailing codes ===
/Add.3 – Addendum to a document.
/Rev.1 – First revision of a document.
/Corr.1 – Corrigendum to a document.

== General Assembly ==
- A/RES/57/100 - The 100th resolution of the General Assembly in Session 57 (the year 2002–2003).
- A/RES/1239(XIII) - Prior to 1976 (session 31), General Assembly resolutions were numbered consecutively from the beginning, with the session number given in Roman numerals. This is the 1239th resolution, which was passed in session 13 (1958–1959).
- A/45/712 - A General Assembly document, number 712 session 45. Sometimes a report or an official letter of representation. These are documents which are referred to during the business of a meeting.
- A/4867 - A General Assembly document from before 1975 when they were numbered sequentially.

=== Special cases ===
- A/52/1 - Always the annual report from the Secretary-General to the General Assembly.
- A/52/2 - Always the annual report from the Security Council to the General Assembly at the start of the session, since 1976. Prior to this it was a numbered document (e.g. A/6702) which needed to be looked up on an index.
- A/52/6/Rev.1 - Always the "Biennial programme plan and priorities" budget report from the Secretary General.
- A/62/50 - Preliminary list of items to be included in the agenda for the 62nd session. Issued in February, seven months before the start of the actual session in September.
- A/520/Rev.16 - Most recent revision of the rules and procedures of the General Assembly (was originally released at A/520 in 1948).

=== Main committees ===
- A/C.5/ - A document from the fifth main committee. Since reports from these committees become working documents of the General Assembly, they are allocated a sequential number within the standard scheme when they are issued.

=== Human Rights Council ===
The Human Rights Council, established in 2006, publishes its own series of documents, many of which are distributed under the General Assembly masthead.

- A/HRC/4/123 - A document circulated in the fourth session.
- A/HRC/S/3/2 - A document circulated in the third special session.
- A/HRC/4/NGO/129 - An NGO authored document circulated in the fourth session.

== Security Council ==
S/RES/1441(2002) – Security Council resolution number 1441 of the year 2002. These are numbered consecutively since the start of the UN.
S/PV.4644 – The verbatim report of the 4644th meeting of the Security Council, numbered since 1945.

S/PV/4460/Resu.2 – Verbatim report of the second resumption (and therefore the third sitting) of the 4460th Security Council meeting.

S/PRST/1996/37 – The 37th Presidential Statement (president of the Security Council) in the year 1996. Prior to 1994 these were issued in the sequential series of documents.

== Secretariat ==
These are documents produced in the name of the Secretary-General but aren't filed under a code-heading for the body they were submitted to. The structure is less easy summarized. For example:

ST/LIB/SER.B/S.38 – Report of Secretary-General to the Security Council in the 56th year/session (=38+18).

The index of the Secretariat's documents issued annually, with a name of the form: ST/IC/2007/1 where 2007 is the year should be referred to.
