= New Way (Jewish newspaper) =

Russian-language newspaper (1916–1917)

Новый путь, Novyĭ putʹ, 'New Way'
- еженедв̌льник, посвященный вопросам еврейской жизни, 'A Weekly Dedicated to Questions of Jewish Cultural Life'
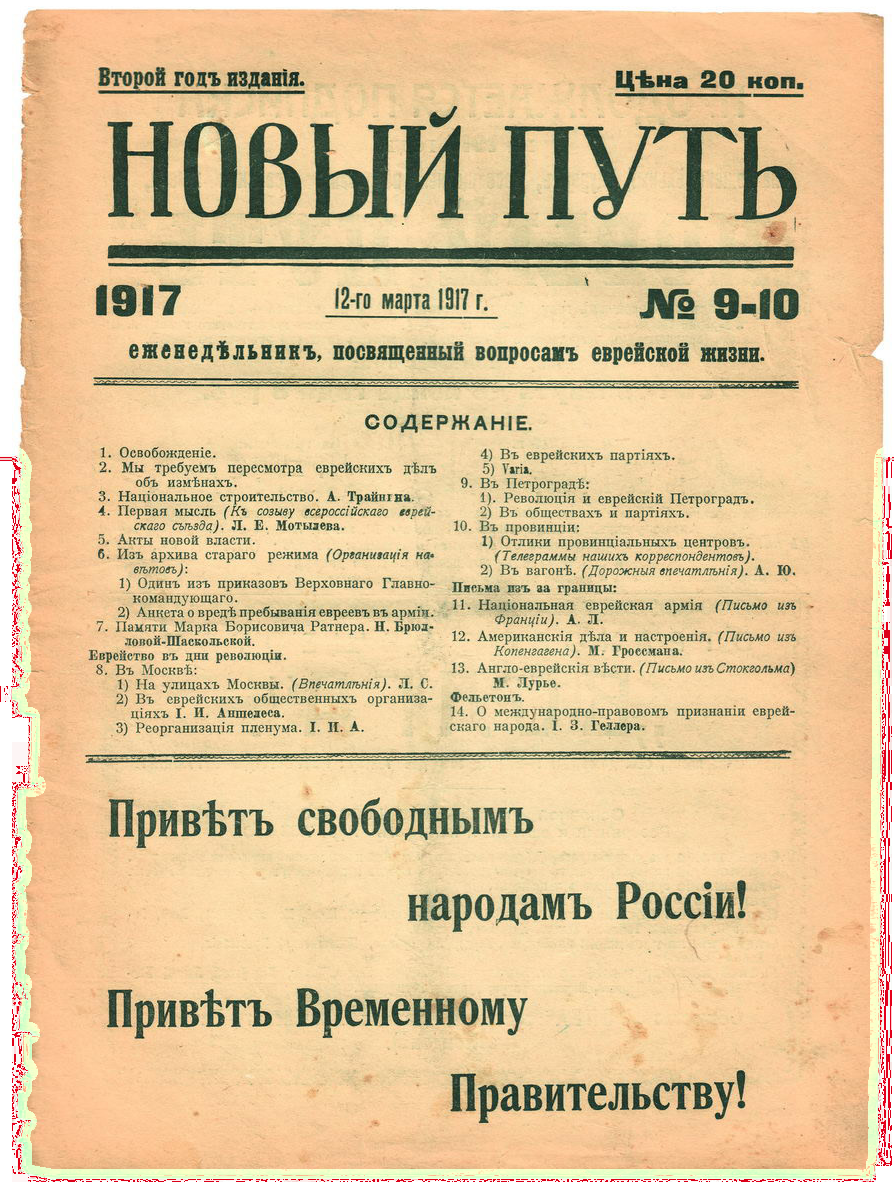
- Front page for 12 March 1917
- Type: Weekly Jewish newspaper
- Format: 30 см.
- Publisher: С. Ко́ган, S. Kogan or С. С. Каган, S. S. Kagan
- Editor: Aron Naumovich Trainin; Abram Markovich Ėfros
- Founded: 1916
- Ceased publication: October 1917
- Language: Russian
- Headquarters: Moscow
- Country: Russian Empire
- OCLC number: 58868102

New Way Russian: Новый путь, romanized: Novyĭ put was a Russian-language weekly Jewish newspaper published in Moscow in the Russian Empire from 1916 until October 1917. Its publisher was С. Ко́ган, S. Kogan or С. С. Каган, S. S. Kagan and editors included Aron Naumovich Trainin and Abram Markovich Ėfros.

== See also ==
- History of the Jews in Russia
