= Marcel de Baer =

Belgian judge and politician (1890–c.1983)

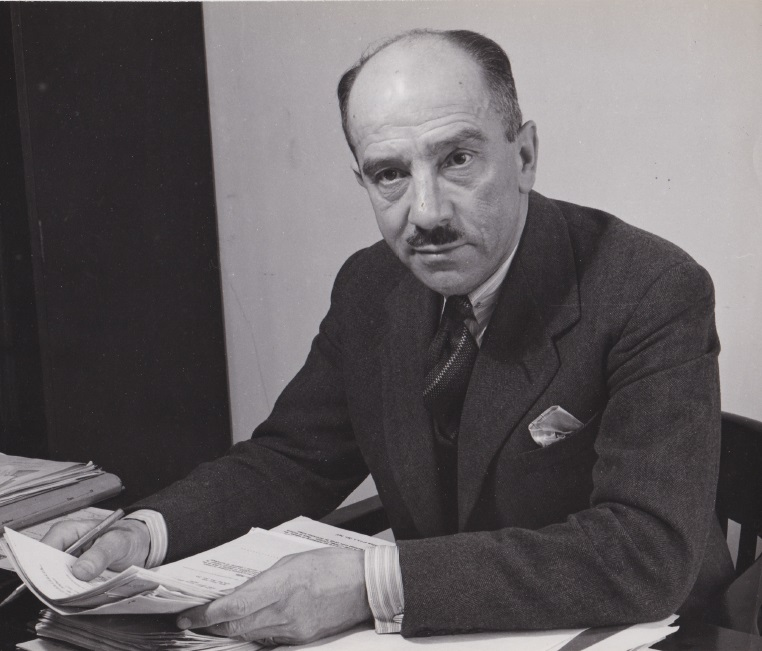
- Marcel de Baer, as chairman at the LIA in 1944
- Born: 31 August 1890; Antwerp, Belgium
- Died: c. 1983; Geneva
- Occupations: Belgian Army Officer, Judge, Politician
- Spouse: Margaret Rudston-Read (m. 1927)
- Children: Philip Rudston; Oliver Rudston
- Awards: Croix de Guerre, Croix Civique

General Marcel Marie José Emile de Baer (31 August 1890 – c. 1983) was a Belgian judge and politician who, as chairman of the London International Assembly, laid the groundwork for the founding of the International Criminal Court in the Hague, and for the Nuremberg Trials. Moving to the UN in 1945, he became chairman of the first Committee of the UN War Crimes Commission, and in 1948, chairman of the Review Board of the International Refugee Organization (IRO) in Geneva.

== Personal life ==
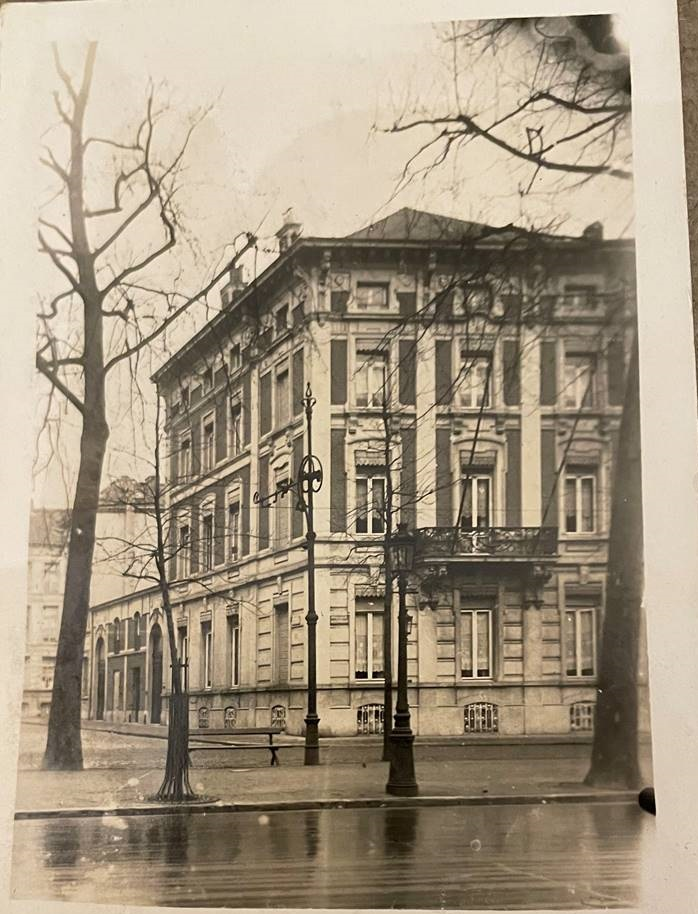
de Baer house in Antwerp, corner of Rue Baechelmans and Avenue de France

Marcel was born to a prosperous family in Antwerp. The family had a large house in town, now demolished and redeveloped, and owned a country house, Domain La Châtaigneraie, near Boechout, now a listed building. Marcel's father, Emil de Baer, and his father's father, Ferdinand de Baer, were both lawyers in Antwerp – working in maritime law and divorce law respectively. On his mother's side, Marcel was part English and part Scottish. Until he was 16 Marcel was home educated by tutors - among them a Scottish governess. Marcel took up law, completing a law degree at Brussels University.

He had one sister, Edmée, from whom he became estranged due to a dispute over inheritance. Marcel was in London at the time, and left the negotiation of a land sale to Petrofina to his sister, but was unhappy with the outcome. Edmée married Charles Boelens, and there was no further communication.

Marcel married Margaret Rudston-Read (1904–1995), in London, May 1927. Under the rules of the time, Margaret had to renounce her British citizenship in order to marry a Belgian. They had two children, Philip (born 29 October 1929) and Oliver (born 13 June 1933). Both boys became naturalised British citizens when they decided to join the British army. Oliver became a cavalry reserve officer, while Philip joined the Royal Artillery and saw service in Korea. Marcel had four grandchildren, Jacqueline and Richard by Philip, and William and Leonora by Oliver.

Marcel was a capable linguist, speaking around 11 languages - among them German, French, Dutch, Flemish, English, Italian, Spanish, Persian and Swahili, with some knowledge of Russian and Arabic. Some of these would come naturally to a Belgian, some would be needed for work, but Marcel pursued an interest generally in learning new languages.

== Career summary ==
- 1912 - Doctorate of Law at the University of Brussels
- August 1914 - called up to join the Belgian army
- 5 August 1914 - wounded at Liège. He received a bullet wound in the shoulder, and was slashed across the stomach with a bayonet. By his own account, he pushed his intestines back inside his body cavity - the dramatic scars remained visible until the end of his life. He was rescued and treated at hospitals in Malmedy, Euskirchen. Hanover and Münsterlager. Recovered, he became a prisoner of war in Germany at Soltau
- 1915 - escaped and was recaptured at Bremen
- August 1916 - escaped a second time, reached Holland then rejoined the Belgian Army
- December 1916 - sent to the Belgian Congo as Territorial Administrator, 1st Class
- January 1917 to the end of 1919 - Territorial Administrator based in Albertville (now Kalemie) Tanganyika
- December 1918 - became Principal Administrator of the territory
- December 1919 - returned to Belgium
- June 1920 - appointed Judge at the Antwerp Tribunal of First Instance
- 1925 - Judge of Instruction (makes the initial inquiry into possible criminal proceedings)
- 1927 - appointed Crown Prosecutor at Leopoldville (now Kinshasa)
- 1928 - appointed President of the Tribunal in the second district of Stanleyville (now Kisangani), Congo
- 1933 - returned to Belgium to the Antwerp Tribunal
- 1936 - appointed Vice President of the Antwerp Tribunal of First Instance
- 1939 - appointed Counsellor at the Court of Appeal in Brussels
- May 1940 following the German invasion of Belgium, escaped via France to the USA and joined Harvard Law School
- November 1940 - joined the Belgian Government in Exile in London
- November 1941 - was invited to join the Cambridge Commission on International law

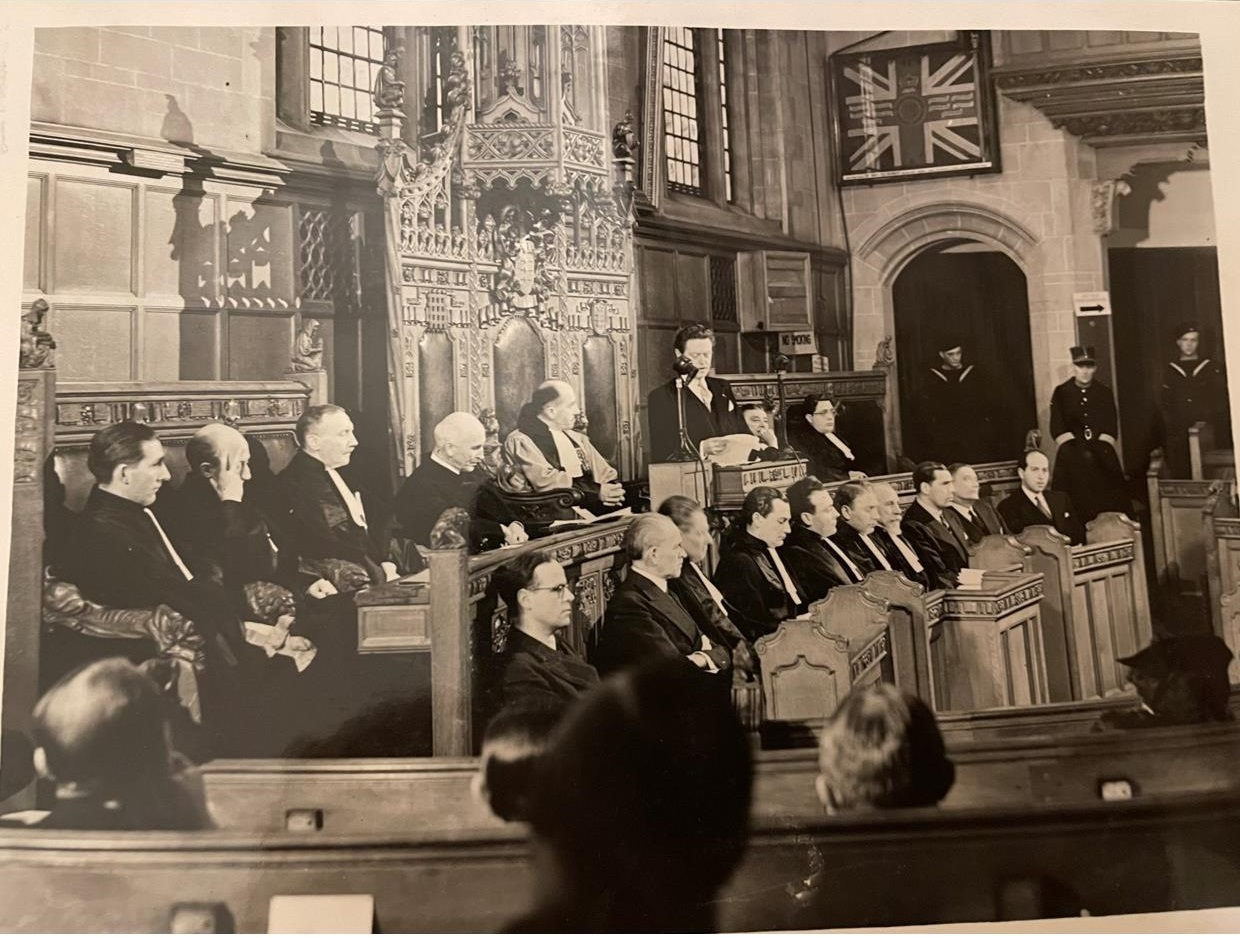
Belgian government in exile, de Baer presiding

- 1941 - 1947 - President of the Military Court of the Belgian Government in exile in London
- 1942 - additionally became President of the Maritime Court
- 1948 - Chairman of the Review Board, International Refugee Organization (IRO), in Geneva
- 1949 - 1955 - Resident Representative of the United Nations to the Shah of Iran in Iran
- 1955 - took retirement at age 65, moved to Domaine de Canteperdrix in Auribeau-sur-Siagne near Cannes, Alpes Maritimes
- 1955 - 1973 - Honorary Vice Consul for Belgium at Nice

=== Parallel activities ===
- 1936 - 1947 - Professor at the Colonial University of Belgium
- Professor at the Higher institute of Commerce in Antwerp
- In charge of courses at the University of Brussels
- 1940 - President and Member of various commissions of the Belgian Government in Exile in London, and other commissions on the Belgian Government too numerous to mention
- 1941 - President of the Commission on War Crimes within the London International Assembly
- 1944 - elected President of the London International Assembly, replacing Lord Cecil
- 1945 - made representative of the Belgian Government at the UN, and President of the first committee at the UN on War Crimes

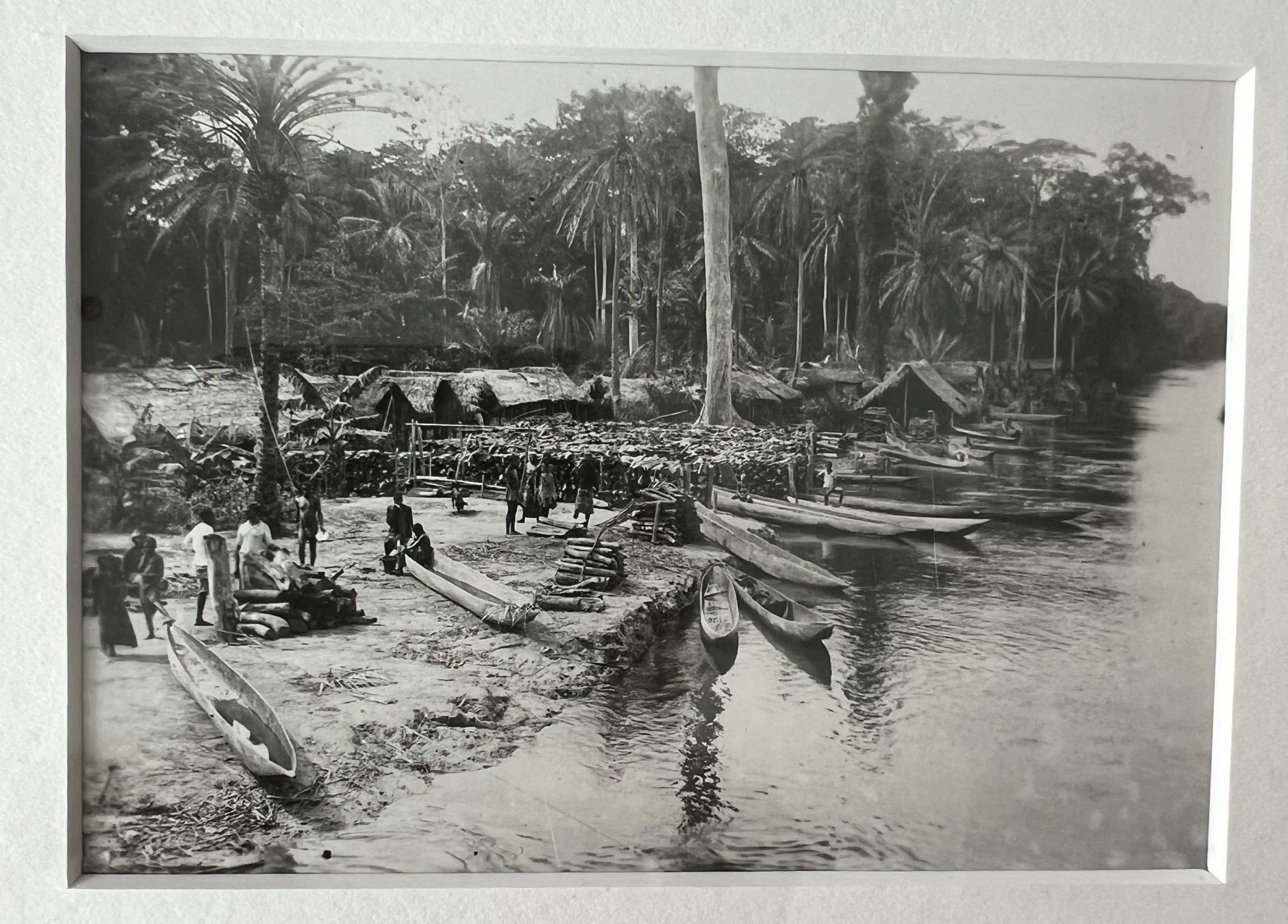
Belgian Congo photograph by Marcel de Baer, 1920 approx

== The Belgian Congo ==
In 1908, following an international humanitarian outcry, King Leopold II was forced to surrender what had been his personal possession, the Congo Free State, to the democratically elected Belgian parliament, when it then became the Belgian Congo. This ended the notorious period of slavery and genocide under King Leopold.

de Baer was sent to the Congo 8 years later, in 1916, and was made administrator of the Tanganyika territory through the years of 1917 to 1919.

De Baer shared the pro colonial attitudes of his time, seeing colonialism as a means of advancing civilisation and commercial enterprise in Third World countries - the Congo became a major producer of diamonds and radium in that period. In the article he penned for 'Belgium Review', "Leopold II: An Undeserved Reputation" he praised Leopold II as a visionary idealist and strategist.

== Work for the London International Assembly ==
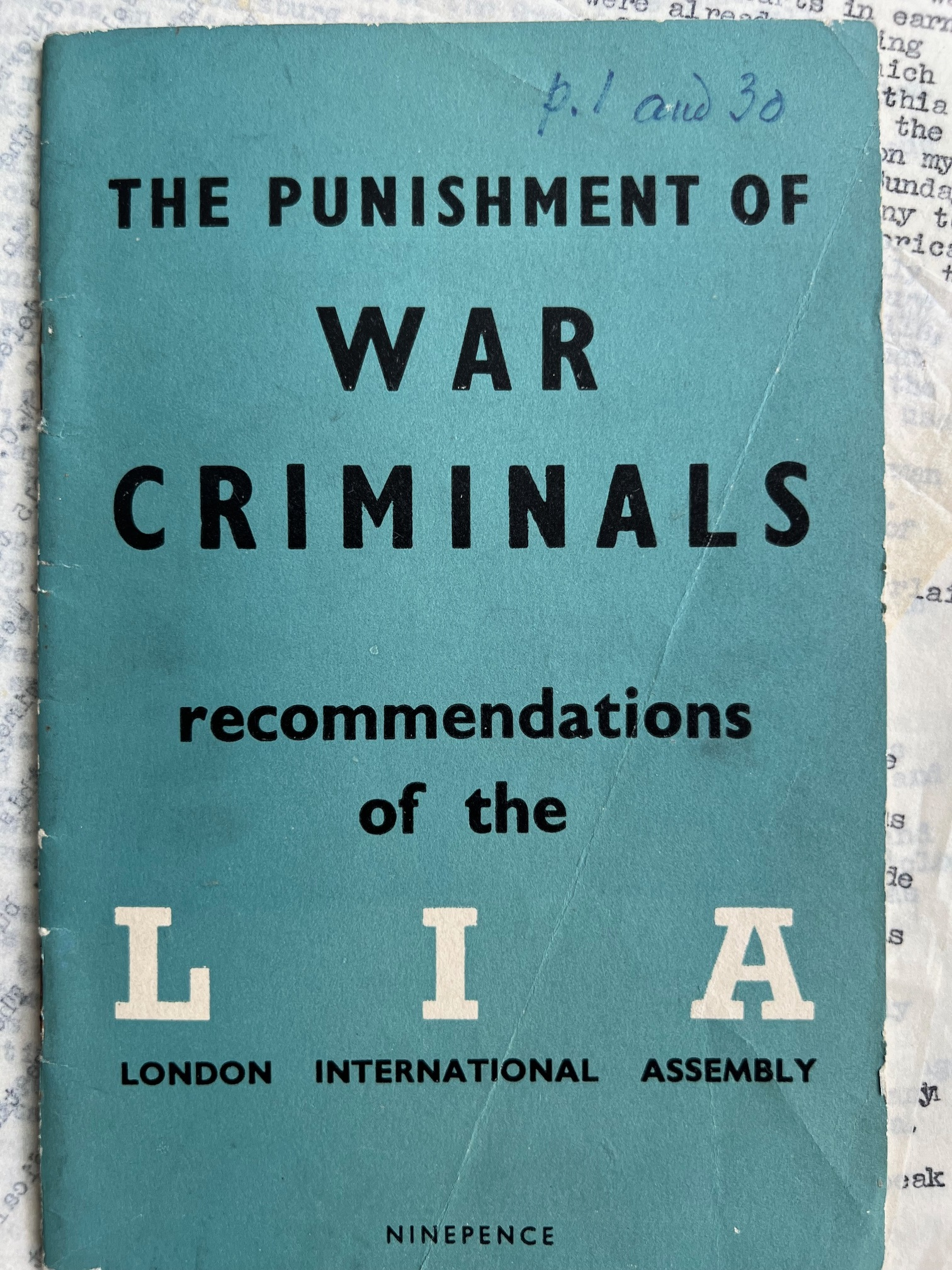
LIA publication, War Criminals, on proposed trials of War Crimes

His most significant work was as a member (1941–1945) and later chairman (1944) of the London International Assembly (LIA) – a committee of allied and friendly countries set up by Churchill under the auspices of the League of Nations to discuss plans for a post-war world order. Following the guidance of the first chairman, Lord Cecil, de Baer was encouraged to set up a committee to look into the question of punishing War Crimes - as, in Lord Cecil's view, de Baer was the person most passionate about it.

(de Baer, on setting up the War Crimes Committee) -
"After we had spoken, several members of the LIA spoke in support of the proposal. Lord Cecil and I then asked Professor Goodheart to form a committee to study the question, but he refused. Lord Cecil then pressed me to form a committee, but I repeated that such a committee, in order to enjoy sufficient prestige, should be formed and presided over not by a national of a small country, but by an Englishman or an American, and I declined the offer.

I then tried to persuade some top British jurists to accept the chair, with the promise that I would do all the spade work and later be the driving spirit of the commission. I approached Lord Maugham and Lord Simon and a few others without success: as reasons they gave that the idea had failed after World War I, that the British law of superior order would preclude any punishment, that the British government felt lukewarm (if not openly hostile) to the idea.

About six months later, Lord Cecil asked me whether I had been able to set up a commission and I explained to him why I had been unable to. "I realise" he said "that people are half hearted about this question, but I feel that it is important and should be carried on, and I can see no one but you who has enough enthusiasm to do it. I strongly feel and urge you to". (Manuscript, de Baer family archive)

De Baer, along with others, had considered the issue of War Crimes between 1919 and 1939 – but, like others, had taken no action then. The previous discussions were impeded by various factors: the defeated nations did not welcome trials and further humiliation of their own personnel, and there was a lack of any legal institution outside of a criminal's own country in which they could be tried.

The earlier War Crimes trials - the Leipzig Trials of 1921 in Germany - arose from demands made in the Treaty of Versailles and were generally viewed as a failure. They were seen as unfairly one-sided by the Germans, and unduly lenient by the Allies. The popular cry in 1918 to "hang the Kaiser", notably supported by Lloyd George, was also a failure. After his abdication in Germany, the Kaiser was invited to the Netherlands by Queen Wilhelmina, and was granted asylum. Extradition requests to the Dutch government were refused. Lacking any determined Allied support, the proposal lost momentum and the Kaiser ended his days in peaceful retirement in Doorn.

"I firmly believe that, if Hitler had merely waged war, however ruthlessly, he and his generals would, after the war, have been treated in the usual way. What revolted mankind was his cynical extermination of innocent Jews. The world could have swallowed concentration camps (eg. Oranienberg, Sachsenhausen) however distasteful such as they had been set up before the war, but not extermination camps such as Treblinka, Auschwitz etc. It is only when the existence of these camps became known that I decided to take action". (Manuscript, de Baer family archive)

In his role on the War Crimes Committee of the LIA, de Baer created early proposals for an international declaration of human rights, a clear definition of war crimes, and, more substantively, for a proposal to set up an international criminal court. Although a member of a minor European government, he influenced the major powers through a series of international presentations and meetings – between 1941 and 1944 he went to around 300 meetings and conferences on this subject. It is possible that the Nuremberg trials would not have gone ahead without his energy and persistence.

At this stage, the British Government were not keen on his proposals – "Lord Vansittart invited me to Denham and led me to understand that, in Sir Anthony Eden's view, I should be given no encouragement in my activities".

De Baer was told that English Military Law – of Superior Order – would mean that only Hitler could be held responsible, that there was no law concerning these acts, and that there was no precedent for it in English law. It was also pointed out to him that discussions on the Peace Treaty would not welcome proposals for trying War Criminals.

At the end of the war, the mood had changed. When there was a request from Belgium that de Baer join the new Belgian government, both the Lord Chancellor of England and the Chairman of the UN War Crimes Commission resisted it, and paid tribute to his efforts, stating that de Baer had been central to making proposals for war crimes trials, and that his continued involvement in the process was critical. When Louis Nizer gave de Baer a copy of his book "What to do with Germany", he included a personal note, praising de Baer's historic contribution.

Due to wartime security restrictions, the LIA operated as a secret organisation for most of its working life. This has hindered the recognition of its work in the historical record. However, his great-granddaughter, Louisa Laughton-Scott, has argued in her dissertation (1st class) as published by Bristol University that the contribution of the London International Assembly to the Declaration of Human Rights, the setting up of the International Criminal Court and the organisation of the Nuremberg War Trials has been neglected by historians, and should be recognised.

It was evident that the League of Nations had failed in its original objectives, and new organisations were needed. The LIA functioned from 1941 to 1944 after which its members and recommendations were absorbed into the newly created United Nations.

== Work for the UN ==
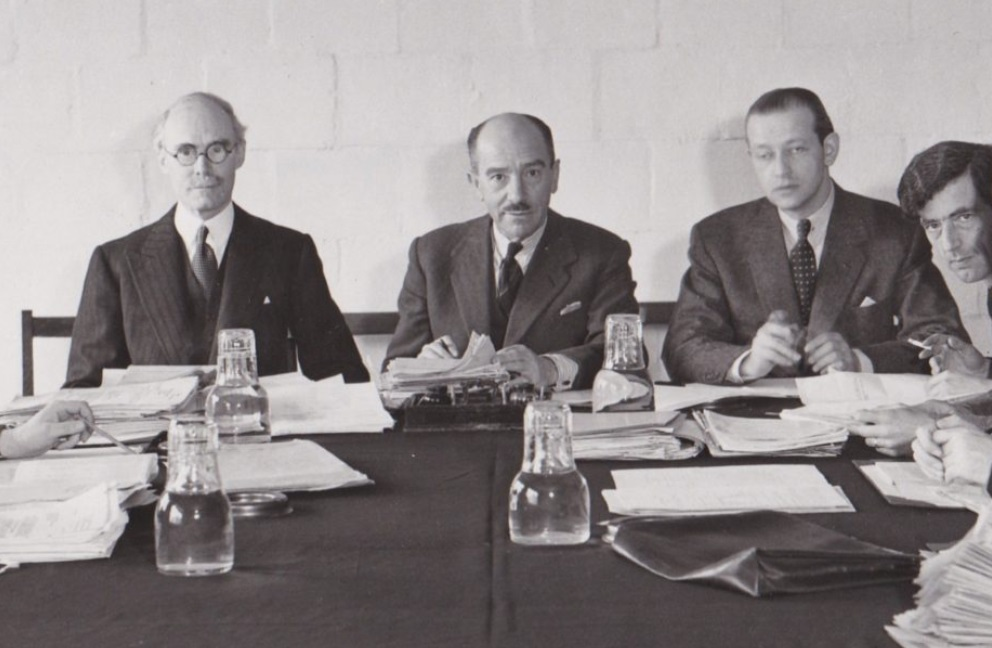
Marcel de Baer at UNWCC committee meeting, London April 1946

Members of the LIA, including de Baer, moved to the newly formed United Nations. In this role, they drafted the proposals and methods for the Nuremberg war trials, and assisted the military authorities to pursue the alleged war criminals through providing information and a viable legal basis to arrest them.

As chairman of the first Committee of the UN War Crimes Commission, de Baer was asked to propose the list of War Criminals to be tried at Nuremberg (de Baer family archive). He refused to include Schacht, and omitted others he considered doubtful – Rudolf Hess and von Neurath among them. The Allied Powers amended his list, reinstating his omissions on the basis that "it would look better if not all of them were sentenced, and some were acquitted". In fact, Schacht was acquitted – the others sentenced.

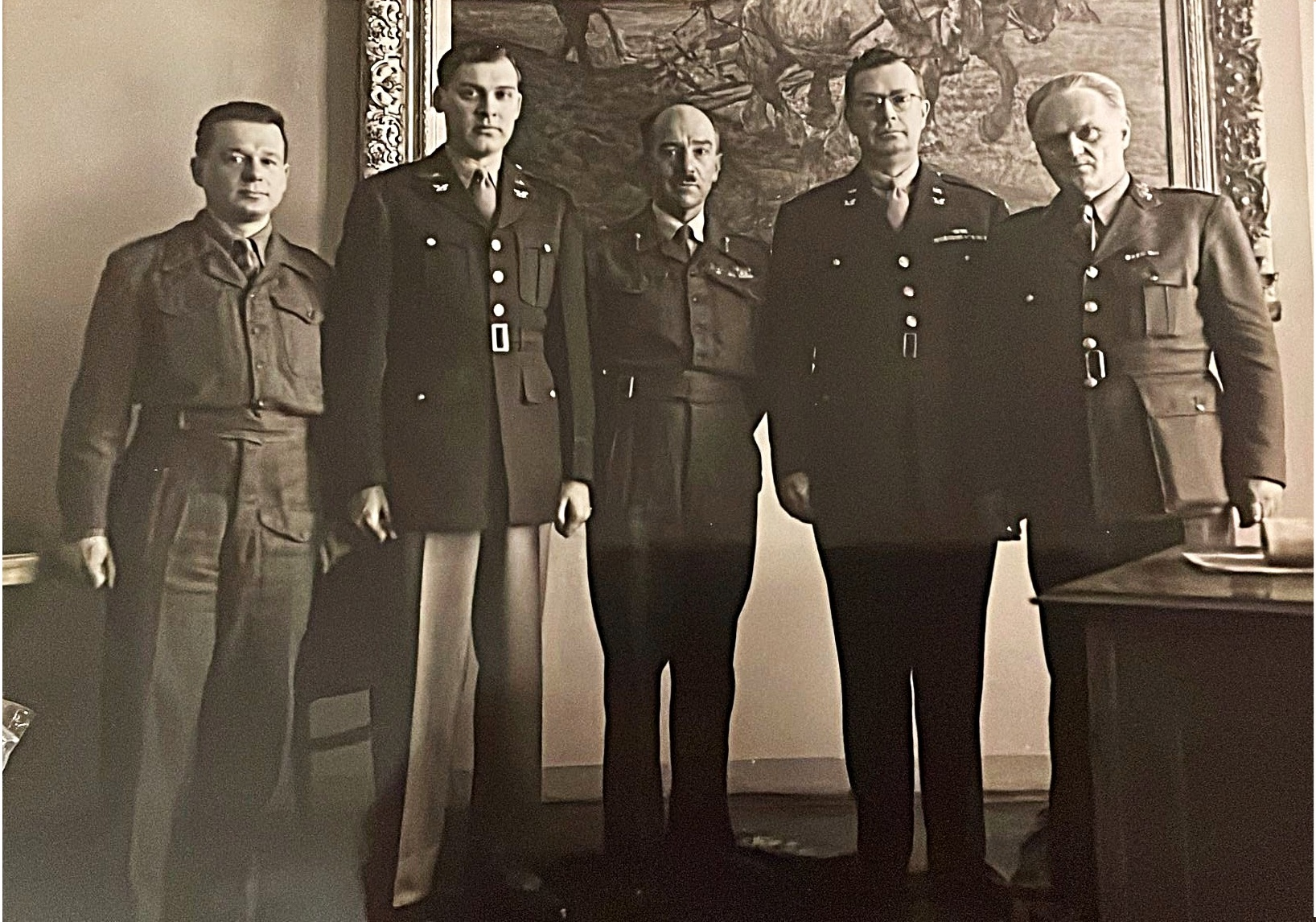
Marcel de Baer, Prague Castle, while at the trial of KH Frank

In 1946, the UN set up the International Refugee Organization (IRO) in Geneva to consider the many post-war applications for refugee status. A Review Board was also set up to consider appeals. Directly after his work at Nuremberg, de Baer moved to Geneva to be Chairman of the Review Board. In her book 'Fascists in Exile', Jayne Persian describes the problems of screening out alleged war criminals from the massive post-war population of displaced persons, and the part played by the IRO within it. In this role, de Baer came into contact with the Austrian Bishop, Alois Hudal who asked for his help. de Baer did not assist Hudal (see side panel).

"The Bishop asked me whether I might find it possible to hear a few appeals from people in whom the Vatican was interested, and who had been turned down, quite wrongly, by the IRO. I said I would see what I could do. He left me a list of the people in whom he was interested, most of them were staying at the Convent of the Franciscan Brothers in the via Sicilia.

To make a long story short, I found the list most suspicious. Many, instead of being given their full name, were listed as (e.g.) 'Father Maximilien of the H. Order of Jesus' which made it impossible to identify them without further investigation. I later found out that many of them had false identities, had never belonged to any religious order, etc. I was even told confidentially, by an American member of the IRO Office that one of the 'priests' was no other than Ante Pavelic, the ex-Ustashi leader of Croatia."

A couple of years later, when the UN offered de Baer the position of High Commissioner for Refugees in Rome, the Vatican sent Monsignor Landis on a special mission to Geneva to inform the UN that de Baer would not be 'persona grata' with the Vatican if he were appointed. Privately informed of this, de Baer turned down the appointment (de Baer family archive). He renounced his Catholicism after this.

As an alternative, he was made UN representative in Iran, where he was chiefly tasked with protecting the oil wells and maintaining the position of the Shah – a valued ally of the United States.

== Retirement ==
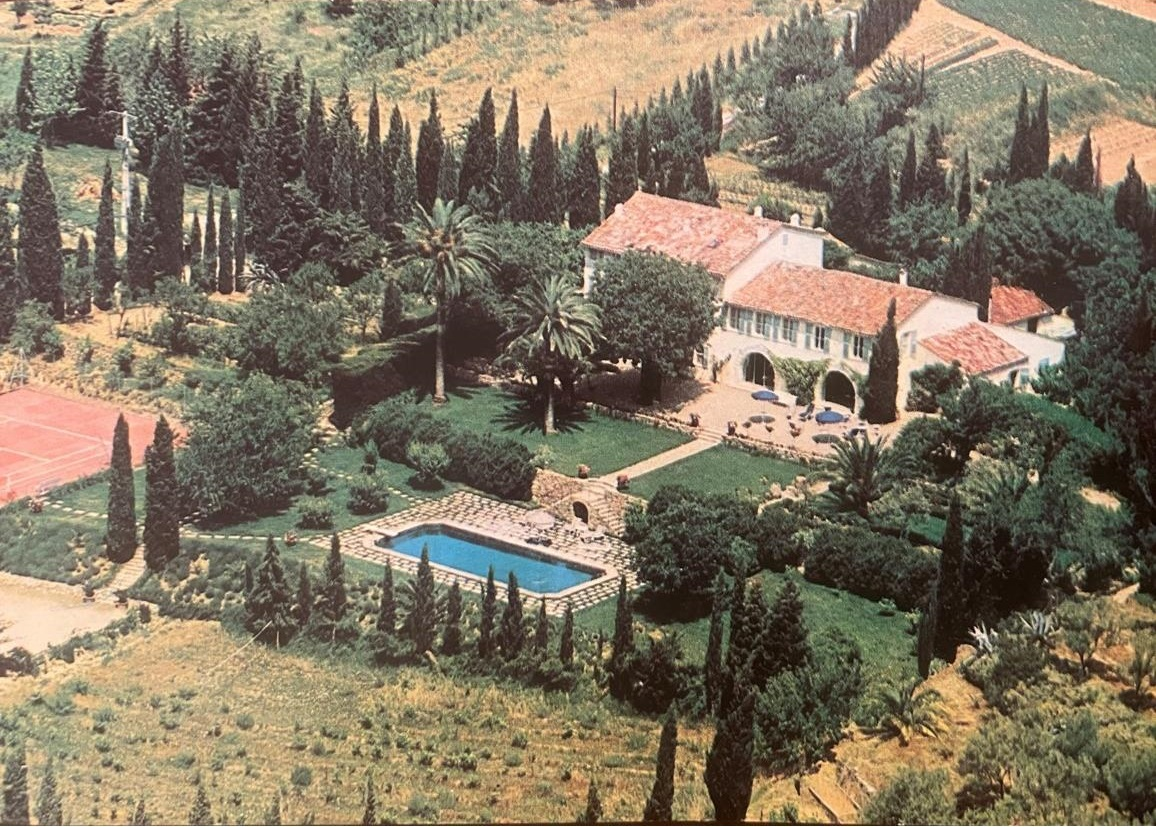
Domaine de Canteperdrix from the air

In 1955, at the age of 65, Marcel retired with his wife to Domaine de Canteperdrix, Auribeau-sur-Siagne near Cannes in the South of France. There they had a farm producing jasmine flowers for the scent industry.

After Marcel's son Philip got divorced, and became involved in drugs and petty crime, Marcel took charge of bringing up his two grandchildren, Jacqueline and Richard. The children spent half the year in Cannes with Marcel and his wife, and half in England with their mother - although most of that time they were away at boarding school. According to his granddaughter, Marcel was a strong character who gave the children a stable and secure home, and a happy, though hard worked, childhood. He insisted on high academic standards, and told the children that they must learn enough of any language to be able to speak it to the frequent international visitors they received at home.

While at Cannes, Marcel was appointed Honorary Vice Consul in Nice for the Belgian Government.

Concerned by the political direction of the then French government, Marcel decided to move to Switzerland, where he and his wife took a suite in the Palace Hotel in Montreux. As Marcel's health declined, they moved to a flat in Tour-de-Peilz. Marcel died in Geneva - the exact date is unavailable. His wife outlived him by many years. His granddaughter eventually inherited Marcel's papers and photographs.

=== The de Baer archive ===
There is an extensive archive of manuscripts, letters and articles, focusing particularly on de Baer's work with the London International Assembly, held by the British Library in London. The papers are at shelf mark 'Add MS 89854'. There is also a selection of photographs from the archive listed under the 'Related Websites' heading.

== Honours ==
- Croix de Guerre
- Croix Civique
- Chevalier of the Royal Order of the Lion
- Officer of the Order of Leopold II
- Officer of the Order of Leopold
- Commander of the Order of the Crown
- Grand Officer of the Order of Homayoun (Iran)

== Related websites ==
- Sara Weydner. "Selected photos from de Baer archive". Humboldt University Berlin.
- KERSTIN VON LINGEN. "LEGAL FLOWS: CONTRIBUTIONS OF EXILED LAWYERS TO THE CONCEPT OF "CRIMES AGAINST HUMANITY" DURING THE SECOND WORLD WAR". Cambridge University Press.
- Marcel de Baer. "THE TRIAL OF WAR CRIMINALS". The National Archives.
- "United Nations War Crimes Commission". encyclopedia.com.
- "War Crimes and the Path towards the UNWCC". In the Shadow of the Holocaust. Cambridge University Press. 2021. pp. 113–143. doi:10.1017/9781009106719.005. ISBN 978-1-009-10671-9.
- Eichenberg, Julia (13 July 2022). "The London International Assembly". Journal of the History of International Law / Revue d'Histoire du Droit International. 24 (3): 334–353. doi:10.1163/15718050-bja10071. S2CID 250575782.
- "UN War Crimes Commission and International Law" (PDF). SOAS.
