= United Nations Official Document System =

Online database of the United Nations

Official Document System
- Producer: United Nations
- History: Digital documents (1993–present); Scanned documents (1946–1993)
- Languages: Arabic, Chinese, English, French, Russian, Spanish

Access
- Providers: United Nations (digitalized material); Dag Hammarskjöld Library (scanned copies, metadata)

Coverage
- Disciplines: international studies, world peace, international security, political science, social science, government resources, area studies
- Record depth: Index, full-text
- Format coverage: Electronic, print
- Temporal coverage: Digital documents (1993–present); Scanned documents (1946–1993)
- Update frequency: Daily

Links
- Website: documents.un.org

The United Nations Official Document System (ODS), commonly known as the Official Document System, is a multilingual online database of the United Nations documents consisting electronic publications from 1993 to the present century available in official languages of the UN, such as Arabic, Chinese, English, French, Russian and Spanish in addition to German language. It was established in 1993 and was later updated in 2016. It preserve full text of its main bodies such as the Security Council, General Assembly, and the United Nations Economic and Social Council in addition to preserve records of the UN subsidiaries and other administrative documents.

The ODS has also maintained a database of scanned copies of all resolutions, principal organs, the Security Council, and General Assembly. However it has not digitalized publishing material issued before 1993 such as press releases, sales publications, yearbooks, the treaty series, and documents without a UN symbol.

Supported by all major web browsers, ODS is maintained by the Office of Information and Communications Technology (OICT). Its new documents are added by the Department for General Assembly and Conference Management (DGACM). However, scanned copies and metadata are frequently added and updated by the Dag Hammarskjöld Library and the United Nations Office at Geneva library.

== Languages ==
The ODS user interface and publishing material is available in 6 official languages with prime focus on international studies, world peace, international security, government and political science with broad categories on area studies, government resources, and social sciences.

== Coverage ==
The ODS digital documents are available published from 1993 to present century and is regularly updated while scanned copies are available published from 1946 to 1993. All published materials are downloadable in any of the available languages.

== See also ==
- United Nations Treaty Series, the largest collection of treaties.
