= 2026 International Criminal Court judges election =

- 7–17 December 2026

6 of 18 seats on the International Criminal Court
- Outgoing judges (Japan) Tomoko Akane (Uganda) Solomy Balungi Bossa (Benin) Reine Alapini-Gansou (Peru) Luz del Carmen Ibáñez Carranza (Canada) Kimberly Prost (Italy) Rosario Salvatore Aitala

Six judges of the International Criminal Court will be elected during the 25th session of the Assembly of States Parties to the Rome Statute of the International Criminal Court to be held from 7 to 17 December 2026 in New York. The judges will be elected for terms of nine years and will take office on 11 March 2027.

== Background ==
The judges elected at this session will replace six judges who were elected in 2017 for full nine-year terms. The newly elected judges will serve for nine years until 2036.

The election is governed by the Rome Statute of the International Criminal Court. Its article 36(8)(a) states that "[t]he States Parties shall, in the selection of judges, take into account the need, within the membership of the Court, for:

- (i) The representation of the principal legal systems of the world;
- (ii) Equitable geographical representation; and
- (iii) A fair representation of female and male judges."

Furthermore, article 36(3)(b) and 36(5) provide for two lists:

- List A contains those judges that "[h]ave established competence in criminal law and procedure, and the necessary relevant experience, whether as judge, prosecutor, advocate or in other similar capacity, in criminal proceedings";
- List B contains those who "[h]ave established competence in relevant areas of international law such as international humanitarian law and the law of human rights, and extensive experience in a professional legal capacity which is of relevance to the judicial work of the Court".

Each candidate has to belong to exactly one list. A minimum of nine judges elected from list A and five judges elected from list B is to be maintained on the court.

Further rules of election were adopted by a resolution of the Assembly of States Parties in 2004.

== Judges remaining in office ==
The following judges were scheduled to remain in office beyond 2027:

Judge	Nationality	List A or B		Regional criteria					Gender	
Judge	Nationality	List A	List B	African	Asian	E. European	GRULAG	WEOG	Female	Male
Miatta Maria Samba	Sierra Leone	X		X					X	
Haykel Ben Mahfoudh	Tunisia		X	X						X
Erdenebalsuren Damdin	Mongolia	X			X					X
Keebong Paek	South Korea	X			X					X
Gocha Lordkipanidze	Georgia		X			X				X
Beti Hohler	Slovenia	X				X			X	
Iulia Antoanella Motoc	Romania		X			X			X	
Althea Violet Alexis-Windsor	Trinidad and Tobago	X					X		X	
María del Socorro Flores Liera	Mexico		X				X		X	
Sergio Gerardo Ugalde Godínez	Costa Rica		X				X			X
Joanna Korner	United Kingdom	X						X	X	
Nicolas Guillou	France	X						X		X
		7	5	2	2	3	3	2	6	6

== Nomination process ==
The nomination period of judges for the 2026 election lasted from 5 January to 29 March 2026. It was extended three times (the maximal number of extensions), to 12 April, to 26 April and finally to 10 May, because the required number of two Asian candidates had not been nominated. The final extension also did not result in this requirement being fulfilled. The following persons were nominated:

Candidate	Nationality	List A or B		Regional criteria					Gender	
Candidate	Nationality	List A	List B	African	Asian	E. European	GRULAG	WEOG	Female	Male
Ezéchiel Amani Cirimwami	Democratic Republic of the Congo		X	X						X
Evelyn Ankumah	Ghana		X	X					X	
Tujilane Chizumila	Malawi	X		X					X	
Mette Lyster Knudsen	Denmark	X						X	X	
Lev Kyshakevych	Ukraine	X				X				X
Guénaël Mettraux	Switzerland	X						X		X
Rosette Muzigo-Morrison	Uganda		X	X					X	
Deo John Nangela	Tanzania	X		X						X
Njoki Susanna Ndung'u	Kenya	X		X					X	
Diana Carolina Olarte Bácares	Colombia		X				X		X	
Ana Peyró Llopis	Spain		X					X	X	
Abdoulaye Seye	Senegal		X	X						X
Veronic Wright	Gambia	X		X					X	
Yoshimitsu Yamauchi	Japan	X			X					X
		8	6	8	1	1	1	3	8	6

The candidatures of Deo John Nangela of Tanzania and Diana Carolina Olarte Bácares of Colombia were withdrawn on 13 August and 11 September 2026 respectively.

== Controversies ==
On August 18 2026, Abdoulaye Seye, Senegal's judicial candidate, who is also a Senior Trial lawyer at the ICC's Office of the Prosecutor heading its Palestine investigation, was sanctioned by the United States.

== Minimum voting requirements ==
Minimum voting requirements will govern part of the election. This is to ensure that articles 36(5) and 36(8)(a) cited above are fulfilled. For this election, the following minimum voting requirements will apply initially:

Criterion	Number of judges required	Number of judges remaining in office	Ex ante voting requirement	Number of candidates	Adjusted voting requirement	Adjusted voting requirement equals ex ante?
Lists A or B
List A	9	7	2	8	2	Yes
List B	5	5	0	6	0	Yes
Regional criteria
African	3	2	1	8	1	Yes
Asian	3	2	1	1	0	No
Eastern European	3	3	0	1	0	Yes
Latin American and Caribbean	3	3	0	1	0	Yes
Western European and other	3	2	1	3	1	Yes
Gender criteria
Female	6	6	0	8	0	Yes
Male	6	6	0	6	0	Yes

Regarding the List A or B requirement, two votes have to be cast for List A candidates.

Regarding the regional criteria, two votes have to be cast for certain regional groups: one for an African candidate and one for a Western European or other candidate.

Regarding the gender criteria, there are no minimum voting requirements in this election.

Because only one Asian candidate has been nominated, the regional minimum voting requirement for Asian candidates is adjusted to zero before the election pursuant to paragraph 20 (b) of the resolution that governs the elections.

The minimum voting requirements are updated after each ballot to account for the judges already elected. The regional and gender requirements are dropped either if they can no longer be (jointly) fulfilled, or if after four ballots not all seats are filled. The List A or B requirement remains active until a sufficient number of judges has been elected from each list.
