= International Criminal Court investigation in Palestine =

Situation in the State of Palestine
- The seal of the International Criminal Court
- File no.: 01/18
- Referred by: State of Palestine
- Date referred: 22 May 2018
- Date opened: 3 March 2021
- Incident(s): Israeli–Palestinian conflict since 13 June 2014: Israeli settlements (2014–present); Gaza war (2014); Gaza border protests (2018–2019); Israel–Palestine crisis (2021); Killing of Shireen Abu Akleh (2022); Gaza war (2023–present)
- Crimes: Crimes against humanity: · Extermination · Murder · Rape · Torture · Persecution · Other inhumane acts War crimes: · Taking hostages · Cruel treatment · Outrages upon personal dignity · Starvation of civilians as a method of warfare · Wilfully causing great suffering, or serious injury to body or health · Intentionally directing attacks against a civilian population

Status of suspects
- Benjamin Netanyahu: Fugitive
- Yoav Gallant: Fugitive
- Mohammed Deif: Warrant withdrawn due to death
- Yahya Sinwar: Warrant application withdrawn due to death
- Ismail Haniyeh: Warrant application withdrawn due to death

The prosecutor of the International Criminal Court (ICC), Fatou Bensouda, on 20 December 2019 announced an investigation into war crimes allegedly committed in Palestine by members of the Israeli military and Hamas and other Palestinian armed groups since 13 June 2014.

The earlier allegations include the establishing of illegal Israeli settlements in the occupied West Bank and violations of the law of war by members of the Israeli military and Hamas during the 2014 Gaza War. Further, starting 8 October 2023, according to the ICC judges there are reasonable grounds to believe that Israeli leaders committed crimes including starvation, murder, deliberately targeting civilians, and persecution; and that Hamas leaders committed crimes including extermination, murder, and hostage-taking.

Israel is not a member of the ICC and disputes the ICC's jurisdiction, stating that Palestine is not a sovereign state capable of being a party to the Rome Statute. (Note: Since 2021, the legal validity of the court's jurisdiction over Palestine has been definitively confirmed by the ICC's pre-trial chamber; see § Preliminary investigation and question of jurisdiction in this article.) According to ICC chief prosecutor Karim Ahmad Khan, suspected war crimes by Israelis on Palestinian territory and by Palestinians on Israeli territory during the Gaza war are within the jurisdiction of the Palestine investigation. Israeli Prime Minister Benjamin Netanyahu has repeatedly accused the allegations and investigation of being "antisemitic" which many consider a weaponization of antisemitism. Since the investigation was opened in 2015, Israel used its intelligence agencies to surveil, pressure, and allegedly threaten senior ICC staff. The United States has imposed sanctions on the court in retaliation.

On 21 November 2024, the ICC issued arrest warrants for Benjamin Netanyahu, Yoav Gallant and Mohammed Deif (who was later revealed to have already been killed in an IDF airstrike), on charges of war crimes and crimes against humanity.

== Preliminary investigation and question of jurisdiction ==
The jurisdiction of the ICC is limited to the territories and nationals of state parties. Israel signed the Rome Statute on 31 December 2000 but did not ratify it. Palestine became a state party with effect from 1 April 2015.

The Palestinian National Authority submitted an ad hoc declaration on 22 January 2009, dated the previous day, accepting the Court's jurisdiction for "acts committed on the territory of Palestine since 1 July 2002." On 3 April 2012, the ICC Prosecutor deemed the declaration invalid because the Rome Statute only permits "States" to make such a declaration and Palestine was designated an "observer entity" within the United Nations (the body that is the depositary for the Rome Statute) at the time.

On 29 November 2012, the United Nations General Assembly passed resolution 67/19, recognising Palestine as a non-member observer state. In November 2013, the Prosecutor concluded that this decision did "not cure the legal invalidity of the 2009 declaration." A second declaration accepting the court's jurisdiction was reportedly submitted in July 2014 by Palestine's Justice Minister Saleem al-Saqqa and General Prosecutor Ismaeil Jabr, but the ICC Prosecutor responded that only the head of state, head of government or minister of foreign affairs has the authority to make such a declaration. After failing to receive confirmation from Minister of Foreign Affairs Riyad al-Maliki during an August meeting that the declaration had been made on behalf of the Palestinian government, the Prosecutor concluded that the declaration was invalid because it did not come from an authority with the power to make it.

In a published opinion in August 2014, the ICC Prosecutor said that, as a result of Palestine's new status, Palestine was qualified to join the Rome Statute. On 2 September 2014, the Prosecutor clarified that if Palestine filed a new declaration, or acceded to the Rome Statute, it would be deemed valid. In December 2014, the assembly of state parties of the ICC recognized Palestine as a "State" without prejudice to any legal or other decisions taken by the court or any other organization. A third declaration was submitted by Palestine on 1 January 2015, dated 31 December 2014, accepting the court's jurisdiction effective 13 June 2014.

Palestine acceded to the Rome Statute on 2 January 2015, with effect on 1 April 2015, and the prosecutor accepted Palestine as state party. In December 2019, Israel argued that the court has no jurisdiction because Palestine is not a sovereign state, in a brief by Israeli attorney general Avichai Mandelblit released hours before an announcement by Fatou Bensouda. The legal validity of the decision to accept Palestine as a state party was definitively confirmed six years later, in 2021.

A preliminary investigation started in 2015.

== 2019 Bensouda report ==
According to Bensouda in December 2019, the criteria for a full investigation had all been met, but jurisdiction had not been established. Bensouda stated, "I am satisfied that war crimes have been or are being committed in the West Bank, including East Jerusalem, and the Gaza Strip".

According to Bensouda's report, the Israeli judicial system already makes provision for punishing those accused of war crimes—meaning that the ICC may not have jurisdiction over alleged Israeli violations; Bensouda wrote that she will have to keep reviewing the "scope and genuineness of relevant domestic proceedings" that remain ongoing. Bensouda also found "a reasonable basis to believe that members of Hamas and Palestinian armed groups" are guilty of war crimes, but these groups have no mechanism for punishing such violations.

Israel is accused of illegally establishing West Bank settlements and violating the laws of war during the 2014 Gaza War, including claims of targeting Red Cross installations. Armed Palestinian organizations, including Hamas, are accused of deliberately attacking Israeli civilians and using Palestinians as human shields.

=== Responses ===
Israel: Israeli prime minister Benjamin Netanyahu condemned the investigation as "a black day for truth and justice" and "pure antisemitism". In an interview with Times of Israel Bensouda described the charge of antisemitism as "a particularly regrettable accusation that is without merit" and emphasized that the court strives to be fair and impartial.

United States and others: Secretary of State Mike Pompeo stated, "We firmly oppose this and any other action that seeks to target Israel unfairly." Australia argued that the issues should be resolved by negotiation, while Germany stated that it trusts the court and wants to avoid politicising the case. Hungary announced that it agrees with Israel's arguments about jurisdiction.

Palestinian Authority: The Palestinian Authority issued a statement declaring that "Palestine welcomes this step as a long overdue step to move the process forward towards an investigation, after nearly five long and difficult years of preliminary examination".

== Decisions on jurisdiction ==
=== Chief Prosecutor's final decision ===
On 16 March 2020, following the submission of amicus curiae briefs, Bensouda requested another month to weigh the question of Palestinian statehood and jurisdiction over the West Bank, Gaza and East Jerusalem. About 50 countries and NGOs had filed such briefs for consideration and on 29 April 2020, over 180 Palestinian and international organizations, and individuals filed an open letter in support of Palestine. Amici curiae filings made by eight states parties, Australia, Austria, Brazil, Canada, Czech Republic, Germany, Hungary and Uganda argued that the ICC did not have jurisdiction on the grounds that Palestine is not a state.

On 30 April 2020, Bensouda stood by her initial finding, writing "The Prosecution has carefully considered the observations of the participants and remains of the view that the Court has jurisdiction over the Occupied Palestinian Territory,"

=== ICC Pre-Trial Chamber I ===
On 5 February 2021, the ICC Pre-Trial Chamber I "decided, by majority, that the Court's territorial jurisdiction in the Situation in Palestine, a State party to the ICC Rome Statute, extends to the territories occupied by Israel since 1967, namely Gaza and the West Bank, including East Jerusalem." Judges ruled that the court has jurisdiction, rejecting Israel's argument to the contrary. The decision does not attempt to determine statehood or legal borders. Presiding Judge Péter Kovács appended a partly dissenting opinion.

On 3 March, within a month of the ICC ruling, the prosecutor opened the investigation which "will cover crimes within the jurisdiction of the Court that are alleged to have been committed in the Situation [of Palestine] since 13 June 2014, the date to which reference is made in the Referral of the Situation to my Office." Without Palestine's additional declaration, the court would only have had jurisdiction over events in Palestine after 1 April 2015. On 1 January 2015, The New York Times reported Shawan Jabarin, director of the human rights group Al Haq, saying that "the Palestinians would submit a request for retroactive jurisdiction to last June 13, to coincide with the period being considered" by the United Nations Fact Finding Mission on the 2014 Israel–Gaza conflict." According to the Associated Press, "the Palestinians chose June 2014 as the start of the investigation to coincide with the run-up to Israel's devastating Gaza war that summer."

== Investigation ==
=== 2021–2022 ===
The ICC prosecutor's office said on 18 March 2021 that it had sent formal notices to Israel and the Palestinian Authority giving them a month "to seek deferral by proving they are carrying out their own investigations" and that letters were sent to ICC member states on 9 March. On 18 March 2021, the Times of Israel, citing Israel's Channel 13, reported that Israel received a letter from the ICC briefly laying out the three main areas the investigation would cover: the 2014 Gaza War, Israeli settlement policy and the 2018–2019 Gaza border protests. Israel was given 30 days to respond. After being interrogated at the Jordan Palestine border crossing following his return to the West Bank on 21 March 2021, after a meeting with the ICC Prosecutor at The Hague, Minister of Foreign Affairs and Expatriate Riyad Malki said that the Israeli authorities threatened to impose sanctions for communicating with the ICC but that contact would continue regardless. On 8 April 2021, Israel said it would write to say that it would not cooperate with the ICC's investigation, arguing that the court did not have jurisdiction and that its own judiciary was capable of trying soldiers suspected of committing war crimes.

Minister of Foreign Affairs and Expatriates Riyad Al-Maliki met the ICC prosecutor Karim Ahmad Khan at the Hague on 9 June 2022 and "questioned the delay in the Court's investigations into the Palestinian issue". According to WAFA, Khan said that Palestine is one of the cases that the Court is looking at and that failure is not an option. The Jerusalem Post reported that, as of 18 June 2022, a year since Fatou Bensouda was replaced by Khan, he "[had] not issued a single public statement or taken a single public action regarding Israel-Palestine". Khan took a strong active position on the 2022 Russian invasion of Ukraine, with international support, based on Ukraine filing an ad hoc acceptance of crimes committed on its territory, even though Russia is not an ICC member, similar to the Palestinian situation. In May, the Palestinian human rights organizations Al-Haq, Al-Mezan and the Palestinian Center for Human Rights (PCHR) submitted a casefile to the ICC in respect of alleged crimes committed in Gaza during the 2021 Israel–Palestine crisis. Submissions were made regarding the death of Shireen Abu Akleh, added to an existing April filing in respect of four other journalists, arguing that Israeli security forces have been systematically targeting Palestinian journalists in violation of international humanitarian law.

=== 2023–present ===
In 2023, the ICC Registry continued to provide three-monthly reports on its information and outreach requests to victims and affected communities, as required since December 2018, publishing its 19th report in May 2023. Units of the ICC involved in the activities as of the May 2023 report included units such as the Victims Participation and Reparations Section and the Trust Fund for Victims. Work was reported on preparing an "online information module" of videos and written information in Arabic about the ICC in relation to the investigation in Palestine.

On 12 October, during the Gaza war, ICC chief prosecutor Karim Ahmad Khan stated that both war crimes committed by Palestinians on Israeli territory and by Israelis on Palestinian territory would be within the jurisdiction of the ICC's Palestine investigation.

On 29 November, Khan visited the Rafah Border Crossing between Egypt and the Gaza Strip. The following day, Khan visited Israel, after Israeli families of victims of the Hamas attacks appealed to the ICC to order an investigation into the killings and abductions. During his visit Khan toured the sites of the massacres of Beeri, Kfar Aza, and the Nova Music Festival near Re'im. In a statement that followed, Khan referred the 7 October attacks against Israeli civilians as serious international crimes, which the ICC was established to address. On 3 December, in a video message from Ramallah, Khan said the 2021 ICC investigation is "moving forward at pace, with rigor, with determination and with an insistence that we act not on emotion but on solid evidence." Khan said that both Israel and Hamas should respect the rules of war and that he was accelerating his investigation into Israeli settler violence.

In late April 2024, ICC staff interviewed Palestinian hospital staff from the Gaza Strip about possible war crimes.

==== Arrest warrant requests ====
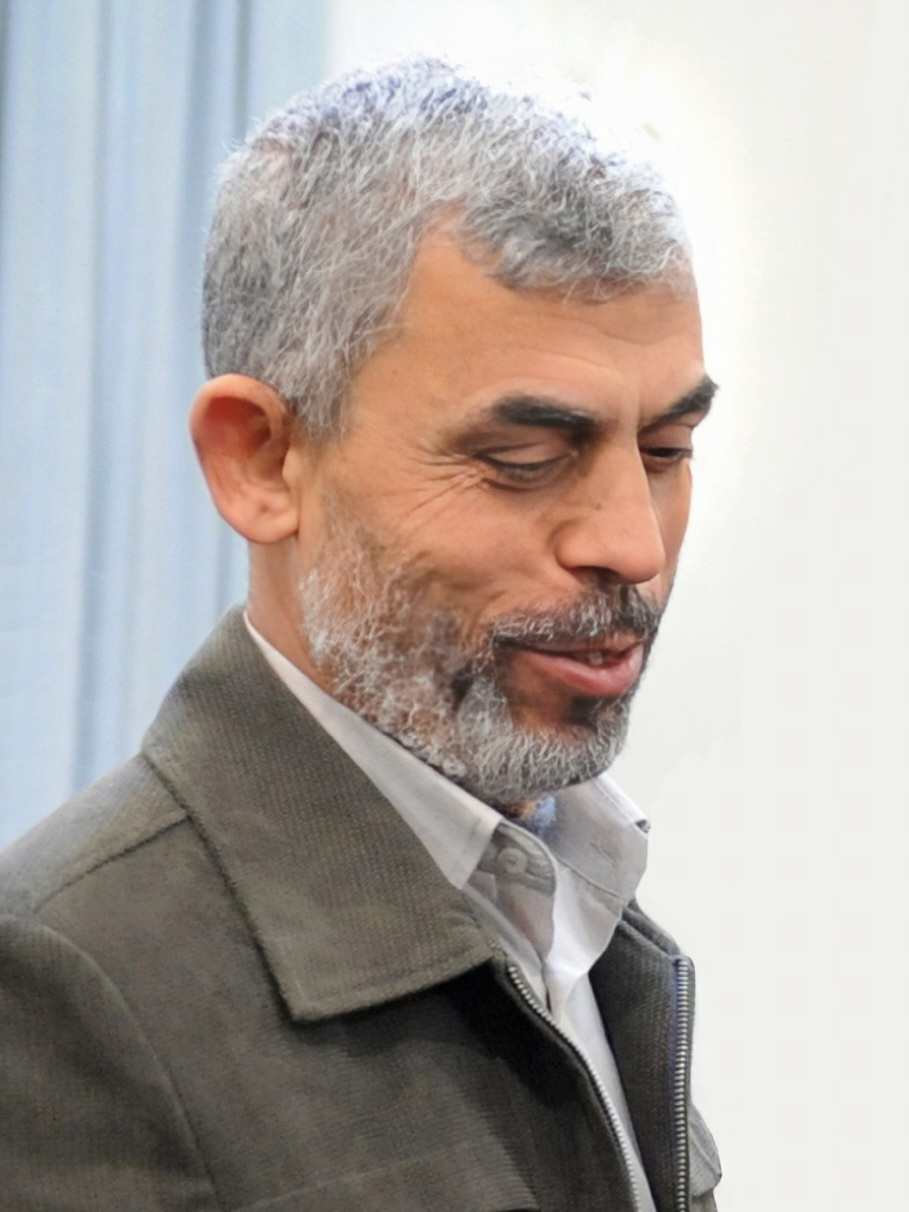
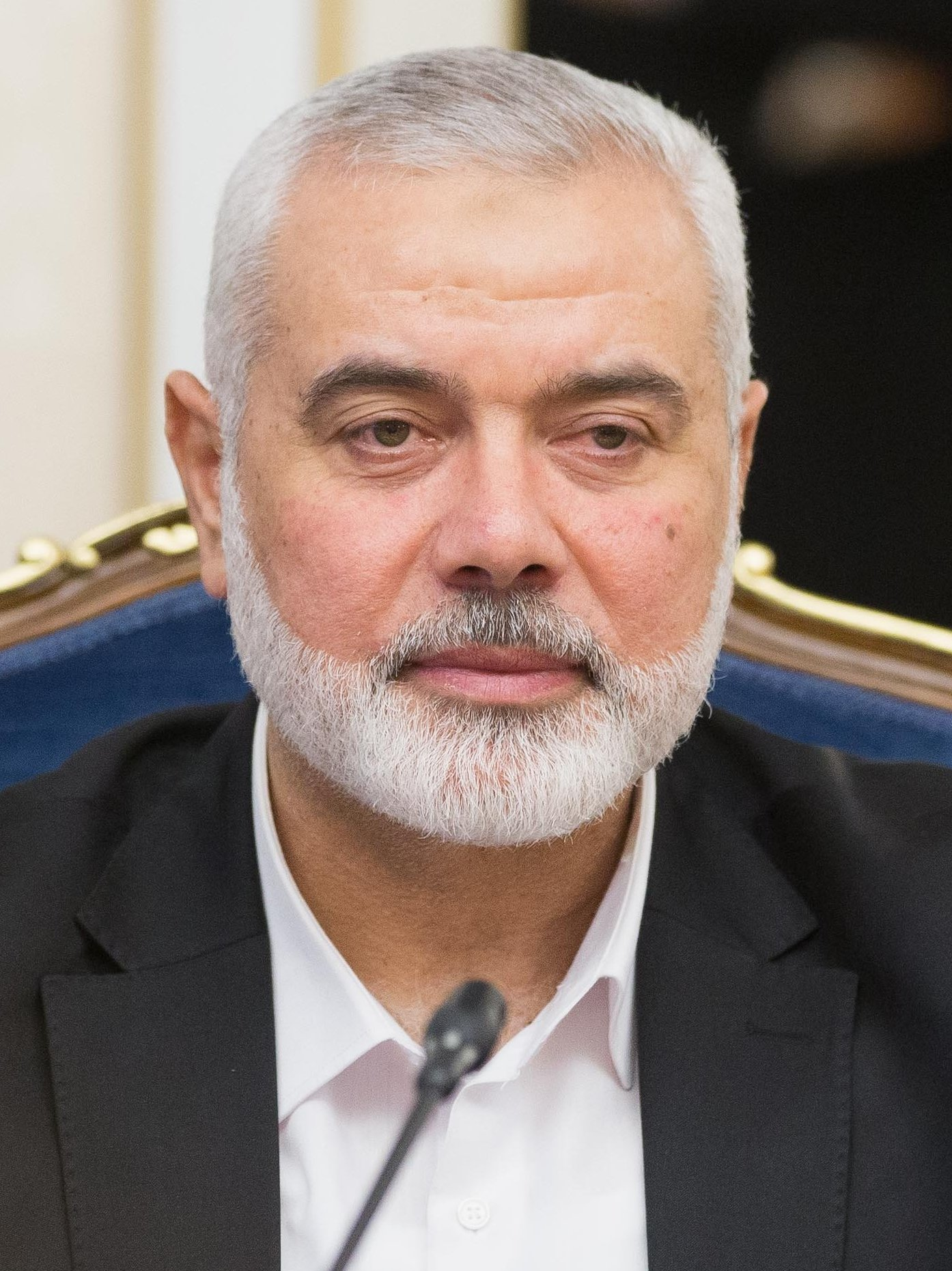
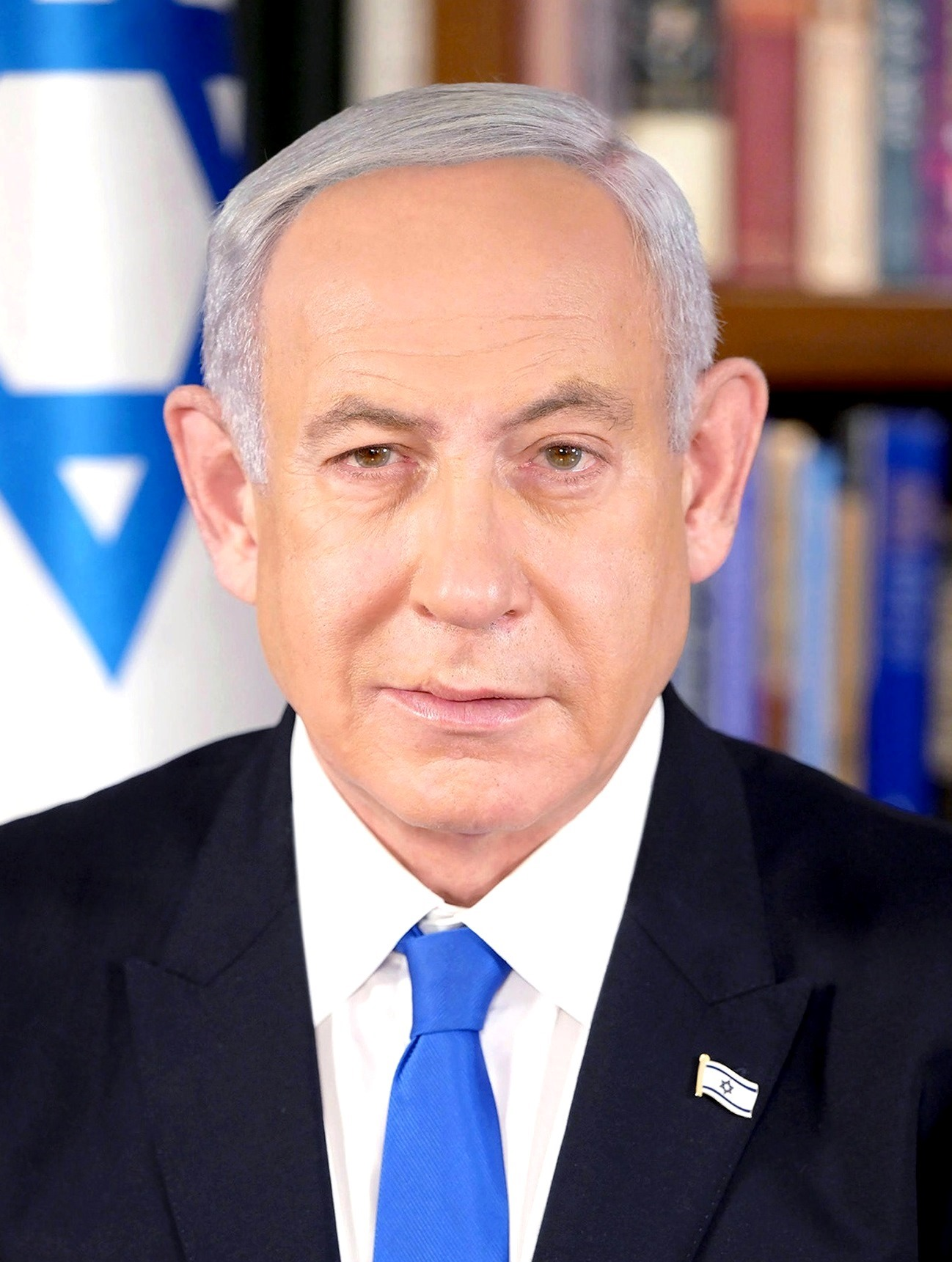
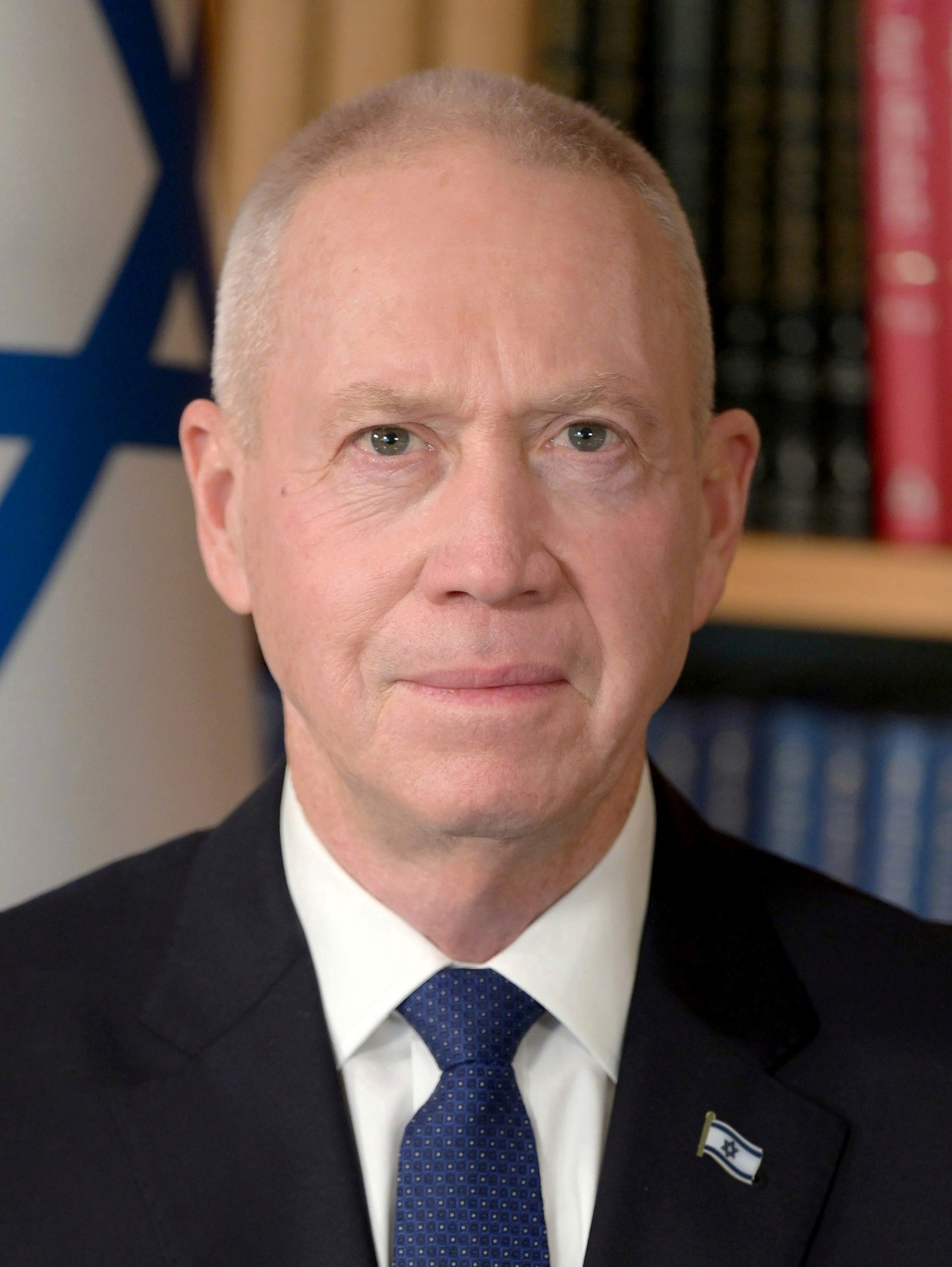
People for whom arrest warrants were requested on 20 May 2024 in the ICC investigation in Palestine. Clockwise from the top left, Yahya Sinwar, Ismail Haniyeh, Yoav Gallant, Benjamin Netanyahu. Mohammed Deif not pictured.

On 20 May 2024, Khan announced that he would file applications for arrest warrants against Hamas leaders Yahya Sinwar, Mohammed Deif and Ismail Haniyeh and Israeli leaders Prime Minister Benjamin Netanyahu and Minister of Defense Yoav Gallant. The request for a warrant against Haniyeh was withdrawn following his assassination on 31 July 2024. The prosecutor stated that he was trying to confirm the death of Deif, whom the IDF claimed had died in the al-Mawasi airstrike, in which case the warrant request would be withdrawn. Sinwar was killed on 16 October 2024.

After the announcement, an investigation found that Israel had for nearly ten years "deployed its intelligence agencies to surveil, hack, pressure, smear and allegedly threaten senior ICC staff in an effort to derail the court's inquiries." The ICC stated that it knew of "proactive intelligence-gathering activities being undertaken by a number of national agencies hostile towards the court". Israel responded to the allegations saying "The questions forwarded to us are replete with many false and unfounded allegations meant to hurt the state of Israel."

In January 2024, prior to his 20 May announcement, Khan convened an eight-person panel of legal and academic experts, including British barrister Amal Clooney, for reviewing his Palestine investigation. Khan requested the panel to review whether his applications for arrest warrants satisfied the ICC's standards. For the May announcement, he asked the panel whether "there were 'reasonable grounds to believe' that those named in the warrant applications had committed crimes within the court's jurisdiction". The panel published a report and stated that it extensively studied the evidence and legal analysis. The panel unanimously found Khan's decision to be justified. The six legal experts from the panel published a statement in the Financial Times explaining their support for the warrant request, stating that the request for the five warrants was "a historic step to ensure justice for the victims in Israel and Palestine".

In applying for the arrest warrants, the prosecutor alleged that Netanyahu and Gallant committed the war crime of starvation as well as "the war crimes of wilfully causing great suffering, or serious injury to body or health or cruel treatment, wilful killing or murder as a war crime, and intentionally directing attacks against civilians in Gaza," and the crimes against humanity of extermination or murder, persecution, and other inhumane acts. Pre-Trial Chamber I of the ICC is expected to issue the arrest warrants if it is satisfied that there are "reasonable grounds to believe" that the persons have committed a crime within the jurisdiction of the Court.

On 27 June 2024, the court decided that it would hear arguments from the UK about ICC jurisdiction over Israeli citizens. Legal experts and Human Rights Watch expressed doubts about the UK arguments. The UK essentially argued that just because Palestine can have criminal jurisdiction over Israeli nationals pursuant to the Oslo Accords, this does not necessarily mean that the ICC automatically has jurisdiction over Israeli citizens outside of Palestinian territories. An Israeli official stated, "the jurisdictional issues are not resolved". On 8 July, following the UK general election won by the Labour Party, Labour officials stated that they considered the ICC to have "jurisdiction over Gaza". The Guardian interpreted this as implying a likely dropping of the UK objection to ICC jurisdiction. Later, Maariv reported that Britain's Foreign Secretary, David Lammy, had given assurances the UK would not drop the jurisdictional objection. On 26 July, the court's deadline for the UK to state its arguments, a government spokesperson stated that the UK would not submit arguments against ICC jurisdiction in the case. Unusually, following the UK move, the Court decided to allow additional submissions until 6 August, delaying the decision on warrants. On 23 August, the Prosecutor's Office asked that the Pre-Trial Chamber issue the required warrants as a matter of urgency. On 20 September, Israel filed an "official challenge" with the court regarding "the ICC's jurisdiction, as well as the legality of the prosecutor's requests for arrest warrants". On 25 October, the Court announced that the presiding Judge of the panel considering the issue of warrants, Iulia Motoc was replaced on medical grounds by Beti Hohler.

== Arrest warrants issued ==
On 21 November 2024, the ICC issued arrest warrants for Benjamin Netanyahu, Yoav Gallant and Mohammed Deif – whose death in a July 2024 Israeli airstrike then remained unconfirmed by independent or Hamas sources. The ICC noted that it was not in a position to determine Deif's status, and decided to issue the warrant as a result. Deif's warrant was "classified as 'secret' to protect witnesses and safeguard the conduct of investigations." Hamas confirmed Deif's death on 30 January 2025. Proceedings against Deif were then terminated on 26 February 2025.

124 ICC member states are required to arrest Netanyahu and Gallant if they enter their territory – including, but not limited to, France, Germany, and the United Kingdom. Conversely, Netanyahu is still welcome in the United States, which is not a member of the ICC.

Netanyahu and Gallant

Pre-Trial Chamber I stated that it found reasonable grounds that from "8 October 2023 until at least 20 May 2024" Netanyahu and Gallant bear criminal responsibility "as co-perpetrators for committing the acts jointly with others: the war crime of starvation as a method of warfare; and the crimes against humanity of murder, persecution, and other inhumane acts" and "as civilian superiors for the war crime of intentionally directing an attack against the civilian population."

Deif

Pre-Trial Chamber I stated that it found reasonable grounds that Deif bears direct and command responsibility "for the crimes against humanity of murder, extermination, torture, and rape and other form of sexual violence; as well as the war crimes of murder, cruel treatment, torture, taking hostages, outrages upon personal dignity, and rape and other form of sexual violence". It found reasonable grounds that "the crimes against humanity were part of a widespread and systematic attack directed by Hamas and other armed groups against the civilian population of Israel". The Arrest warrant for Deif was later rescinded, as it became clear he was killed in an Israeli strike.

== Resources ==
As of October 2023, the Palestine investigation in particular and the ICC as a whole were underfunded according to Karim Khan. Khan stated, "Palestine – like every other situation that we have – is underfunded and under-resourced and it is a challenge to state parties and the international community whether they wish to give us the tools to do the job."

== Administration ==
Andrew Cayley, a barrister and former military prosecutor, was appointed in March 2024 to manage the investigation together with US lawyer Brenda Hollis.

== Retaliation by Israel and the United States ==
=== Israeli threats ===
In 2024, an investigation by The Guardian, jointly with the Israeli magazines +972 and Local Call, uncovered a nine-year campaign by Israel using its intelligence agencies "to surveil, hack, pressure, smear and allegedly threaten senior ICC staff in an effort to derail the court's inquiries". Israel had intercepted phone calls and other types of communications of several ICC officials including former prosecutor Fatou Bensouda and her successor Karim Ahmad Khan, a surveillance campaign that was closely followed by Israeli Prime Minister Benjamin Netanyahu, whom one intelligence officer described as being "obsessed". The efforts were carried out by Mossad, Shin Bet, and the Israeli military's intelligence directorate. On 14 June, following The Guardian's investigations, 93 states party to the Rome Statute issued a joint statement stating that they would defend the ICC and "preserve its integrity from any political interference and pressure against the court, its officials and those cooperating with it".

In one incident, two months after the opening of the investigation in 2015, ICC prosecutor Bensouda was approached by an unknown German woman who had given her an envelope that contained hundreds of dollars and a paper with a phone number originating in Israel. The incident was reported to the Dutch authorities, which provided Bensouda with extra security.

In another incident in 2019, Bensouda was "ambushed" by Mossad director Yossi Cohen, who had suddenly appeared in a New York hotel suite that was hosting an official meeting between the prosecutor and then Democratic Republic of the Congo president Joseph Kabila. Cohen proceeded to subject Bensouda to unwanted calls, with sources interviewed by The Guardian describing him as becoming "increasingly threatening and intimidating".

In 2023, following the Israel–Hamas war, during the investigations led by the new prosecutor Karim Khan, the ICC improved its security situation in anticipation of further Israeli surveillance attempts.

=== US sanctions ===
In February 2025, the Trump administration imposed sanctions on the ICC. The United States has directly sanctioned half the court's 18 judges as well as other officials. Donald Trump signed Executive Order 14203 sanctioning ICC personnel with asset freezes and travel bans. The Executive Order followed the failure to pass sanctions in congress against the ICC for its arrest warrant for Benjamin Netanyahu.

In July 2026, US Secretary of State Marco Rubio threatened to dismantle the court "brick by brick".

In October 2026, the US announced further sanctions banning US entities from making transactions with the ICC. The ICC called the sanctions "an assault on the rule of law and on the very foundations of the international legal order". The Netherlands, Germany, France, Japan, Italy, Canada, Denmark and the United Kingdom jointly reaffirmed their "continued and unwavering support" for the ICC and said that they strongly disagree with the sanctions. The European Commission said that the European Union was "ready to take any necessary measures to enable the court to carry out its work".

== Reactions ==
On 16 April 2024, Netanyahu and three Israeli government ministers held an emergency meeting with governmental legal advisors to discuss the possibility of ICC arrest warrants being issued against Netanyahu, other senior officials, or officers of the Israel Defense Forces. According to Channel 12, a decision was taken at the meeting that "Israel would reach out to the court and 'diplomatic figures with influence'" with the aim of blocking the issuing of arrest warrants. By late April, Israeli officials considered it increasingly likely that warrants would be issued for Israeli and Hamas officials. The Times of Israel (ToI) described Israeli officials as making "a concerted effort" to prevent the ICC from issuing warrants. The ToI stated that the Israeli National Security Council and Foreign Ministry were involved in acting against the ICC issuing warrants, and that Netanyahu was carrying out a "nonstop push over the telephone" with the US government of president Biden to prevent the warrants. Diplomats from the G7 states asked the court not to announce war crimes warrants against either Israeli or Hamas officials, arguing that warrants could "disrupt" ceasefire talks. The ICC unofficially stated to diplomats that it was "not aware of any dramatic moves in the investigation". The ICC refused to comment, saying it would not respond to "speculation in media reports".

Zeteo News published what it claimed was a scan of a 24 April letter sent to Khan by twelve Republicans in the U.S. Senate, Tom Cotton, Marco Rubio, Ted Cruz, Mitch McConnell, Marsha Blackburn, Katie Boyd Britt, Ted Budd, Kevin Cramer, Bill Hagerty, Pete Ricketts, Rick Scott, and Tim Scott, which requested the ICC not to make any attempt to pursue charges against Israeli officials over war crimes committed in the Gaza Strip. The senators stated: "Target Israel and we will target you ... [and] sanction your employees and associates, and bar you and your families from the United States. ... You have been warned." Democratic U.S. Senator, Chris Van Hollen, commented on the letter: "It is absolutely wrong to interfere in a judicial matter by threatening judicial officers, their family members and their employees with retribution. This thuggery is something befitting the mafia, not U.S. senators." On 1 May 2024, US senators met court officials online to discuss potential arrest warrants. On 3 May 2024, chief prosecutor Khan, while not mentioning the warrants, called for "all attempts to impede, intimidate, or improperly influence officials [to] cease immediately" and referred to Article 70 of the Rome Statute defining "retaliating against an official of the court on account of duties performed" as an offence.

Reactions to the 20 May 2024 request for arrest warrants varied from opposition to support. US President Joe Biden and Secretary of State Antony Blinken condemned the arrest warrant for Netanyahu. Blinken said the Biden administration would work with Congress on potential sanctions against the ICC. US members of Congress Kathy Manning and Ritchie Torres also denounced the arrest warrant against Netanyahu. Senator Lindsey Graham threatened "damning sanctions against the ICC." Canada's Prime Minister Justin Trudeau said it was "troubling" that arrest warrants were simultaneously being sought for "the democratically elected leaders of Israel and the bloodthirsty terrorists that lead up Hamas." Then British premier Rishi Sunak called the arrest warrants "deeply unhelpful", stating there is no "moral equivalence" between Israel and Hamas, adding that this move would make "absolutely no difference" to achieving wider peace in the Middle East. Government representatives of Argentina, Austria, Hungary and Paraguay expressed opposition to the request. Czech Prime Minister Petr Fiala called the ICC Prosecutor's request for an arrest warrant "appalling and absolutely unacceptable". Polish Prime Minister Donald Tusk also criticized the arrest warrant request for Netanyahu. Hamas spokesperson Sami Abu Zuhri criticized the arrest warrant requests as "equat[ing] the victim with the executioner".

Statements of support were made by several figures. US member of Congress Ilhan Omar said that the ICC "must be allowed to conduct its work independently and without interference." According to US attorney Kenneth Roth, who led Human Rights Watch for 29 years, "These charges are not about Israel's right to defend itself, which no one questions. They're about how Israel has chosen to defend itself, and no cause, no matter how just, can be used as an excuse to commit war crimes." According to Kenneth Roth, the credibility of Israel's claim to be carrying out a local legal procedure that takes precedence over ICC-level procedures is weak due to Israeli threats to the ICC, which could amount to obstructions of justice and may violate Article 70 of the Rome Statute. Israeli human rights group B'Tselem said: "The era of impunity for Israeli decision-makers is over."

Government representatives of Australia, France, Spain, Ireland, Belgium, Switzerland, Austria, Slovenia, Denmark, Norway, Chile, Canada, South Africa, Maldives, Oman and Jordan expressed support for the independence of the ICC. In June 2024, 93 nations including the aforementioned reiterated their support for the ICC's independence. Israeli attorney general Gali Baharav-Miara stated that the investigation lacked jurisdiction and that Khan's request for arrest warrants was baseless. She stated that the request was inconsistent with the ICC's requirement to let national-level legal systems handle the situation first.

Following the release of the arrest warrants in late November 2024, the White House said that it “fundamentally rejects” the ruling, with US President Joe Biden denouncing it as "outrageous." A White House spokesperson announced that the US is "discussing next steps" with Israel and other partners. Michael Waltz, set to become US national security adviser under President-elect Donald Trump, promised a "strong response" to the ICC's "antisemitic bias". Italy expressed "many doubts" about the feasibility of executing the warrants, and France, while stating "It is ultimately up to the judicial authorities to decide," also said that Israeli leaders were protected by immunity rules that apply to states not party to the ICC. Austria's foreign ministry said the decision was "utterly incomprehensible." Czech PM Petr Fiala called the ICC decision "unfortunate" and said it "undermines authority in other cases by equating the elected representatives of a democratic state with the leaders of an Islamist terrorist organization." Hungarian Prime Minister Viktor Orbán announced that he would not cooperate with the ICC and instead invite Netanyahu to visit his country.

Canadian politician and human rights advocate Irwin Cotler criticized ICC Prosecutor Karim Khan for his approach toward Israeli leaders, asserting that Khan violated principles of cooperation and complementarity by issuing arrest warrants for them while being lenient toward Venezuelan leader Nicolás Maduro.

A joint statement adopted during the G7 Ministerial meeting on Foreign Affairs in Fiuggi, Italy refrained from directly mentioning the arrest warrants. However, it "urge[d] the Israeli Government to abide by its international obligations" and "underline[d] that there can be no equivalence between the terrorist group Hamas and the State of Israel." The statement also "reiterate[d the G7 nations'] commitment to International Humanitarian Law" and emphasized that "[they] will comply with [their] respective obligations."

== See also ==
- Legal Consequences of the Construction of a Wall in the Occupied Palestinian Territory
- ICJ case on Israel's occupation of the Palestinian territories
- South Africa v. Israel (Genocide Convention)
- The Hague Group
- United Nations Fact Finding Mission on the 2014 Israel–Gaza conflict
