= Executive Order 14203 =

2025 US order sanctioning the International Criminal Court

- "Imposing Sanctions on the International Criminal Court"
- Front page of Executive Order 14203
- Type: Executive order
- Number: 14203
- President: Donald Trump
- Signed: February 6, 2025

Summary
- Order imposing sanctions against the International Criminal Court (ICC) based in The Hague, the Netherlands

Executive Order 14203, titled "Imposing Sanctions on the International Criminal Court", is an executive order signed by United States president Donald Trump on February 6, 2025. The order imposes sanctions against the International Criminal Court (ICC) based in The Hague, Netherlands. The order includes visa restrictions and financial penalties for people who help the ICC investigate US citizens and US allies.

== Background ==
The International Criminal Court (ICC) can prosecute people worldwide for war crimes, crimes against humanity and genocide. 125 nations are members of the Court, but neither the US nor Israel have chosen to become members. During Trump's first presidency, he imposed sanctions against the ICC's chief prosecutor, Fatou Bensouda, and one of her associates, as punishment for investigating possible US war crimes in Afghanistan.

In November 2024, the ICC issued arrest warrants for the Israeli prime minister, Benjamin Netanyahu, and Yoav Gallant, who at the time was the Israeli defense minister. Israel and the United States opposed the decision. In the week prior to this executive order, the Republican majority in the US Senate tried to pass sanctions against the ICC, but was blocked by Democratic senators. A month prior to the order, the ICC anticipated that the incoming Trump administration would issue financial sanctions, and paid its staff three months' salary in advance.

Reuters reported Trump was concerned that the ICC would prosecute him or his senior aides.

== Order ==
=== Overview ===
The order imposes sanctions against the International Criminal Court based in The Hague, Netherlands. The order includes visa restrictions and financial penalties for people who help the ICC investigate US citizens and US allies. The order was widely perceived as intended as punishment for the arrest warrants issued by the ICC against Netanyahu and Gallant. They are suspected of war crimes and crimes against humanity, allegedly committed by the Israeli forces in the Gaza Strip during the Gaza war. It also imposed sanctions against ICC prosecutor Karim Khan.

=== Actions taken under the order ===
On June 5, 2025, Marco Rubio, the United States Secretary of State, announced that he would be placing four ICC judges on the sanctions list under the order: Slovenian Beti Hohler, Beninese Reine Alapini-Gansou, Peruvian Luz del Carmen Ibáñez Carranza, and Ugandan Solome Bossa. In his announcement, Rubio claimed that the four "have actively engaged in the ICC's illegitimate and baseless actions targeting America or our close ally, Israel. The ICC is politicized and falsely claims unfettered discretion to investigate, charge, and prosecute nationals of the United States and our allies. This dangerous assertion and abuse of power infringes upon the sovereignty and national security of the United States and our allies, including Israel."

On July 9, 2025, Rubio announced that he was drawing on the order to impose sanctions against Francesca Albanese, the United Nations special rapporteur for human rights in the Palestinian territories. Rubio claimed Albanese was antisemitic, supported terrorism, and expressed "open contempt" for the US, Israel, and western countries, and said the sanctions were prompted by her "illegitimate and shameful" attempts to get the ICC to act against "officials, companies, and executives" in Israel and the US.

On August 20, 2025, Rubio announced that four more ICC judges would be placed on the sanctions list under the act: Senegalese Mame Mandiaye Niang, French Nicolas Guillou, Canadian Kimberly Prost, and Fijian Nazhat Shameem. In the announcement, Rubio described the ICC as a "bankrupt institution" and "a national security threat that has been an instrument for lawfare against the United States and our close ally Israel." A state department press release said, "Prost is being designated for ruling to authorize the ICC's investigation into U.S. personnel in Afghanistan." Prost's decision was made in 2020. Prost later said "I was somewhat surprised that I would be sanctioned for something I had done five years ago (...) particularly because sanctions are not about punishment, they're about changing your conduct, deterring you. And of course, none of that applies to me" because the investigation is "dormant". In September 2025, the administration announced it was designating Al Haq, Al Mezan Center for Human Rights, and the Palestinian Centre for Human Rights under the order.

On December 18, 2025, Rubio announced that the government was adding Georgian ICC judge Gocha Lordkipanidze and Mongolian ICC judge Erdenebalsuren Damdin to the sanctions list under the order, saying that two "have directly engaged in efforts by the ICC to investigate, arrest, detain, or prosecute Israeli nationals, without Israel's consent." The move was criticised by the International Bar Association (IBA), which denounced the sanctions as politically motivated interference with the Court's independence. IBA executive director Mark Ellis stated that the measures undermined the international rules-based order and amounted to an attempt by the Trump administration to intimidate ICC judges and obstruct the prosecution of serious international crimes.

On the 9th of October 2026, new sanctions were levied against the ICC, banning them from access to Amazon web services, US aligned banks, as well as taking away the healthcare of workers there. The announcement explicitly states that these actions can be undone if the ICC makes decisions favorable to the United States. Officials at the ICC including President Tomoko Akane have stated they're not interested in changing course based on the sanctions and have already taken steps to replace US services. The sanctions come hours after Donald Trump became upset he did not win the Nobel Peace Prize, with it instead going to a former ICC judge, Navi Pillay.

== Reactions ==
Caspar Veldkamp, Dutch minister of foreign affairs, stated via X that he regretted Trump's decree and wrote "The work of the court is essential in the fight against impunity. Our country has a strong reputation and responsibility as a host country of important international legal institutions. The Netherlands actively contributes to strengthening the international legal order and multilateral cooperation and will fulfill binding international legal and treaty obligations in good faith." In a post on X, Antonio Costa, the president of the European Council, called the executive order a "threat" to the independence of the international judicial institution, and said that sanctioning the ICC "undermines the entire international legal system".

== Effects ==
Judges sanctioned by the American government have stated that the sanctions have directly affected their personal lives. In a December 2025 interview with The Irish Times, Prost described effects such as how banks had immediately cut off her credit cards, how online shopping had become effectively impossible for her, how she had lost access to her Amazon accounts, how the daughter of one of her colleagues who had been sanctioned who had been living in the US had had her visa revoked, and how it became extremely difficult for her and her colleagues to exchange money between different currencies and send cash transfers to family members. Prost stated that although those effects were "small annoyances, but when they all come together at once in your life, it's paralysing."

== See also ==
- America shock
