= 2023 International Criminal Court judges election =

- 4–6 December 2023

6 of 18 seats on the International Criminal Court
- Outgoing judges (Germany) Bertram Schmitt (Hungary) Péter Kovács (France) Marc Pierre Perrin de Brichambaut (Poland) Piotr Hofmański (Democratic Republic of the Congo) Antoine Kesia-Mbe Mindua (South Korea) Chung Chang-ho Elected judges (Mongolia) Erdenebalsuren Damdin (Romania) Iulia Antoanella Motoc (France) Nicolas Guillou (Slovenia) Beti Hohler (Tunisia) Haykel Ben Mahfoudh (South Korea) Keebong Paek

Six judges of the International Criminal Court were elected during the 22nd session of the Assembly of States Parties to the Rome Statute of the International Criminal Court held from 4 to 14 December 2023 in New York. The judges were elected for terms of nine years and took office on 11 March 2024.

== Background ==
The judges elected at this session replaced six judges who had been elected in 2014 for full nine-year terms. The newly elected judges will serve for nine years until 2033.

The election was governed by the Rome Statute of the International Criminal Court. Its article 36(8)(a) states that "[t]he States Parties shall, in the selection of judges, take into account the need, within the membership of the Court, for:

- (i) The representation of the principal legal systems of the world;
- (ii) Equitable geographical representation; and
- (iii) A fair representation of female and male judges."

Furthermore, article 36(3)(b) and 36(5) provide for two lists:

- List A contains those judges that "[h]ave established competence in criminal law and procedure, and the necessary relevant experience, whether as judge, prosecutor, advocate or in other similar capacity, in criminal proceedings";
- List B contains those who "[h]ave established competence in relevant areas of international law such as international humanitarian law and the law of human rights, and extensive experience in a professional legal capacity which is of relevance to the judicial work of the Court".

Each candidate has to belong to exactly one list. A minimum of nine judges elected from list A and five judges elected from list B is to be maintained on the court.

Further rules of election were adopted by a resolution of the Assembly of States Parties in 2004.

== Judges remaining in office ==
The following judges were scheduled to remain in office beyond 2024:

Judge	Nationality	List A or B		Regional criteria					Gender	
Judge	Nationality	List A	List B	African	Asian	E. European	GRULAG	WEOG	Female	Male
Reine Alapini-Gansou	Benin		X	X					X	
Solomy Balungi Bossa	Uganda	X		X					X	
Miatta Maria Samba	Sierra Leone	X		X					X	
Tomoko Akane	Japan	X			X				X	
Gocha Lordkipanidze	Georgia		X			X				X
Althea Violet Alexis-Windsor	Trinidad and Tobago	X					X		X	
María del Socorro Flores Liera	Mexico		X				X		X	
Luz del Carmen Ibáñez Carranza	Peru	X					X		X	
Sergio Gerardo Ugalde Godínez	Costa Rica		X				X			X
Rosario Salvatore Aitala	Italy	X						X		X
Joanna Korner	United Kingdom	X						X	X	
Kimberly Prost	Canada	X						X	X	
		8	4	3	1	1	4	3	9	3

== Nomination process ==
The nomination period of judges for the 2023 election lasted from 2 January to 26 March 2023. It was extended three times (the maximal number of extensions), to 9 April, to 23 April and finally to 7 May, because the required number of four Asian candidates had not been nominated. The final extension also did not result in this requirement being fulfilled. The following persons were nominated:

Candidate	Nationality	List A or B		Regional criteria					Gender	
Candidate	Nationality	List A	List B	African	Asian	E. European	GRULAG	WEOG	Female	Male
Haykel Ben Mahfoudh	Tunisia		X	X						X
Erdenebalsuren Damdin	Mongolia	X			X					X
Adélaïde Dembélé	Burkina Faso	X		X					X	
Nicolas Guillou	France	X						X		X
Beti Hohler	Slovenia	X				X			X	
Ute Hohoff	Germany	X						X	X	
Mirjana Lazarova Trajkovska	North Macedonia	X				X			X	
Iulia Antoanella Motoc	Romania		X			X			X	
Clarence Nelson	Samoa	X			X					X
Keebong Paek	South Korea	X			X					X
Andres Parmas	Estonia	X				X				X
Andriamanankadrianana Rajaona	Madagascar	X		X						X
Pavel Zeman	Czech Republic	X				X				X
		11	2	3	3	5	0	2	5	8

== Minimum voting requirements ==
Minimum voting requirements governed part of the election. This was to ensure that articles 36(5) and 36(8)(a) cited above were fulfilled. For this election, the following minimum voting requirements applied initially:

Criterion	Number of judges required	Number of judges remaining in office	Ex ante voting requirement	Number of candidates	Adjusted voting requirement	Adjusted voting requirement equals ex ante?
Lists A or B
List A	9	8	1	11	1	Yes
List B	5	4	1	2	1	Yes
Regional criteria
African	3	3	0	3	0	Yes
Asian	3	1	2	3	2	Yes
Eastern European	3	1	2	5	2	Yes
Latin American and Caribbean	3	4	0	0	0	Yes
Western European and other	3	3	0	2	0	Yes
Gender criteria
Female	6	9	0	5	0	Yes
Male	6	3	3	8	3	Yes

Regarding the List A or B requirement, one vote had to be cast for a List A candidate and one for a List B candidate.

Regarding the regional criteria, four votes had to be cast for certain regional groups: two for Asian candidates and two for Eastern European candidates.

Regarding the gender criteria, three votes had to be cast for male candidates.

The minimum voting requirements are updated after each ballot to account for the judges already elected. The regional and gender requirements are dropped either if they can no longer be (jointly) fulfilled, or if after four ballots not all seats are filled. The List A or B requirement remains active until a sufficient number of judges has been elected from each list.

== Ballots ==
The ballot results were as follows:

Candidate	Nationality	4 December 2023		5 December 2023						6 December 2023		
Candidate	Nationality	1st ballot	2nd ballot	3rd ballot	4th ballot	5th ballot	6th ballot	7th ballot	8th ballot	9th ballot	10th ballot	11th ballot
Valid votes cast		114	117	116	121	123	123	120	123	119	122	122
Two-thirds majority		76	78	78	81	82	82	80	82	80	82	82
Erdenebalsuren Damdin	Mongolia	81	elected									
Iulia Antoanella Motoc	Romania	71	78	elected								
Nicolas Guillou	France	65	70	67	71	79	84	elected				
Beti Hohler	Slovenia	56	62	61	60	67	71	71	82	elected		
Haykel Ben Mahfoudh	Tunisia	57	62	51	58	67	68	69	76	74	86	elected
Keebong Paek	South Korea	75	65	69	79	77	81	75	77	75	81	83
Andres Parmas	Estonia	57	59	51	53	53	55	50	52	46	55	39
Clarence Nelson	Samoa	73	58	54	52	43	43	32	34	30	5	withdrawn
Andriamanankadrianana Rajaona	Madagascar	34	30	35	32	37	32	31	32	withdrawn		
Ute Hohoff	Germany	32	30	26	22	19	19	16	withdrawn			
Mirjana Lazarova Trajkovska	North Macedonia	39	32	26	25	17	16	withdrawn				
Pavel Zeman	Czech Republic	25	24	15	17	12	withdrawn					
Adélaïde Dembélé	Burkina Faso	14	8	5	7	withdrawn						

The minimum voting requirements are imposed on the ballots cast, not on the results. Thus, there is no guarantee that a corresponding number of judges is elected. However, in this election this was the case:

Criterion	Initial minimal voting requirement	Corresponding number of judges elected?
List A	1	Yes, after 1st ballot
List B	1	Yes, after 2nd ballot
Asian	2	Yes, after 11th ballot
Eastern European	2	Yes, after 8th ballot
Male	3	Yes, after 10th ballot

Note that the minimum voting requirements according to region and gender were dropped after the 4th ballot and were thus no longer being imposed when a second Asian, second Eastern European and third male judge were elected in the 11th, 8th and 10th ballot, respectively.
