= ICC arrest warrants for Israeli leaders =

2024 International Criminal Court warrants

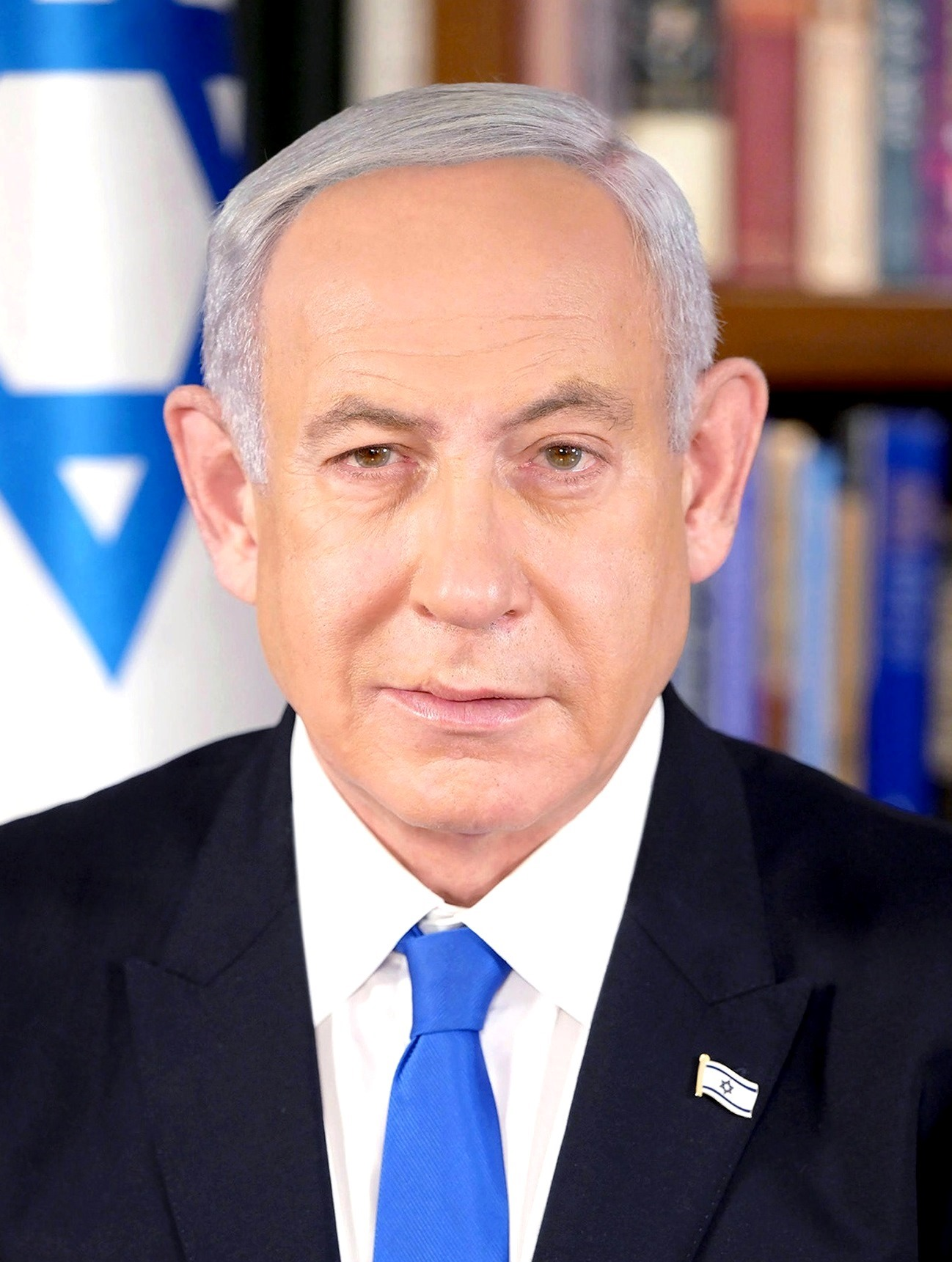
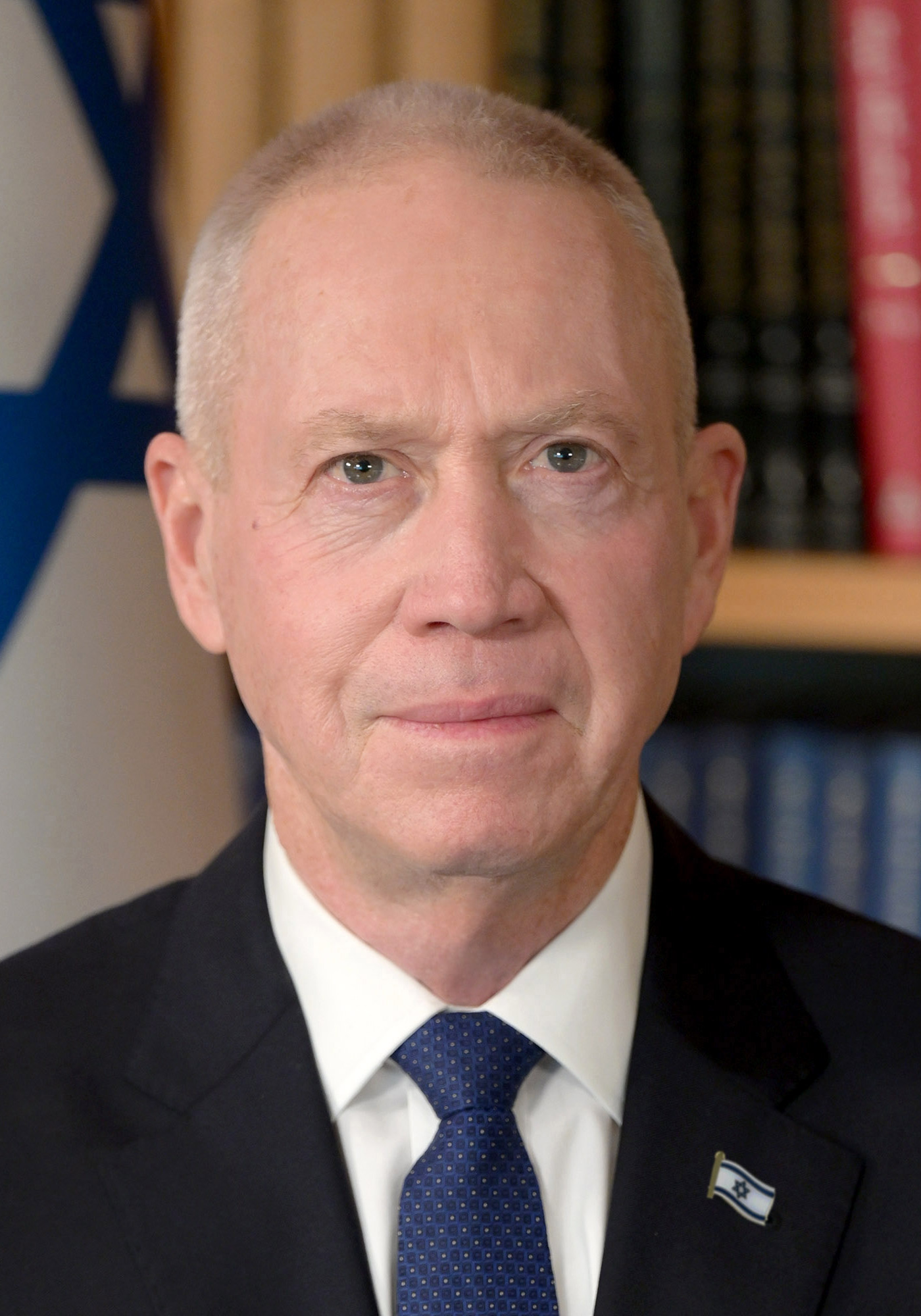
Benjamin Netanyahu (left) and Yoav Gallant (right). Both have arrest warrants issued against them by the ICC.

On 21 November 2024, following an investigation of war crimes and crimes against humanity, the International Criminal Court (ICC) issued arrest warrants for two senior Israeli officials, Benjamin Netanyahu, the prime minister of Israel, and Yoav Gallant, the former Minister of Defense of Israel, alleging responsibility for the war crime of starvation as a method of warfare and the crimes against humanity of murder, persecution, and other inhumane acts during the Gaza war and genocide. The warrant against Netanyahu is the first against the leader of a Western-backed democratic country for war crimes.

All 125 ICC member states are required to arrest Netanyahu and Gallant if they enter the state's territory. The ICC also issued an arrest warrant for Hamas military commander Mohammed Deif, who was killed in an Israeli airstrike on 13 July 2024 but whose death remained unconfirmed at the time. (Note: The ICC noted that it was unable to determine whether Deif had been killed, and was therefore issuing the warrant for his arrest. The ICC did not issue arrest warrants against two other Hamas leaders, Yahya Sinwar and Ismail Haniya, as their deaths had been confirmed.) By January 2025, Hamas confirmed Deif's death, and a few weeks later the ICC cancelled the arrest warrant against him.

It has been alleged that an additional arrest warrant for Israeli Finance Minister Bezalel Smotrich was requested on 2 April 2026 on charges of war crimes and crimes against humanity, but the report has not been officially confirmed. Warrants may still be issued against additional Israeli senior IDF officers involved in the Gaza war—an action recommended by a United Nations Commission of Inquiry, which also called for genocide charges to be added to the warrant after finding the Israeli government guilty of multiple violations of the 1948 Genocide Convention.

The United States has retaliated by imposing sanctions on the court since February 2025.

== Background ==
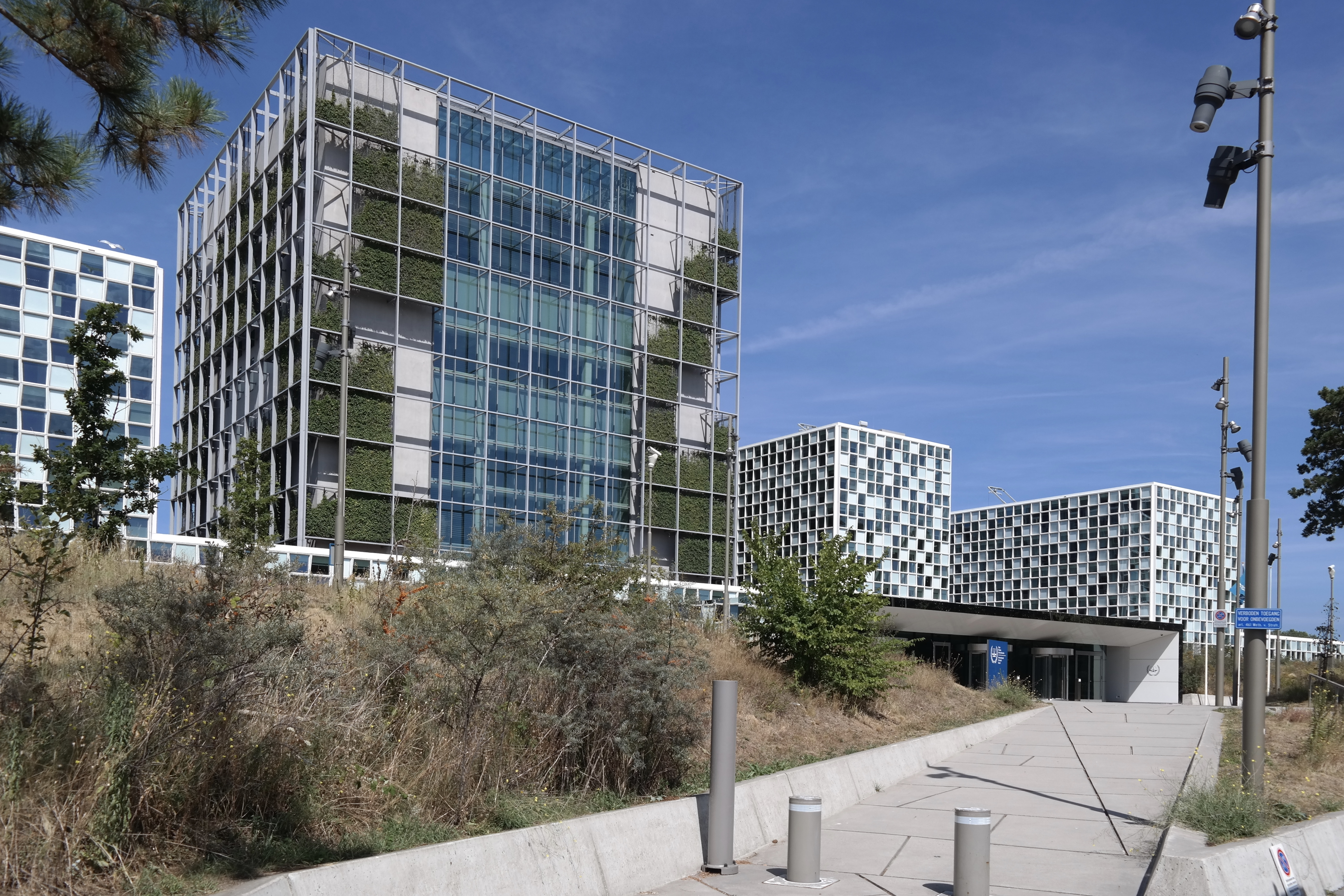
The premises of the International Criminal Court in The Hague, Netherlands

The ICC was established in 2002 to prosecute war crimes, crimes against humanity, genocide, and the crime of aggression when member states are unwilling or unable to do so. It can also prosecute crimes committed by nationals or on territory of any of its 125 member states. It currently is also investigating crimes committed in Ukraine, Uganda, and others. The Palestinian territories were admitted as a member state in 2015, allowing for the investigation even though Israel is not a member and does not recognize its jurisdiction.

All of the 125 member states of the ICC are obliged by their agreements to the courts founding statute to arrest and hand over any individual with an active ICC arrest warrant, if they are identified in their territory. The ICC does not have a way of directly implementing an arrest, with no authority over any police force. The ICC can sanction a non-cooperative member state.

On 20 December 2019, ICC prosecutor Fatou Bensouda announced an investigation into war crimes allegedly committed in Palestine by members of the Israel Defense Forces or Hamas and other Palestinian armed groups since 13 June 2014. Since the investigation was opened in 2015, Israel used its intelligence agencies to surveil, pressure, and threaten senior ICC staff.

=== Gaza war ===
On 12 October 2023, ICC chief prosecutor Karim Khan stated that war crimes committed by Palestinians on Israeli territory and by Israelis on Palestinian territory during the Gaza war would be within the jurisdiction of the ICC. On 17 November 2023, Khan stated the ICC had received a joint request by South Africa, Bangladesh, Bolivia, Comoros, and Djibouti to investigate alleged Israeli war crimes. On 29 December 2023, South Africa filed a case against Israel at the International Court of Justice, alleging that Israel's conduct amounted to genocide.

In late April 2024, ICC staff interviewed Palestinian hospital staff from the Gaza Strip about possible war crimes.

== Arrest warrants ==
On 20 May 2024, Khan announced that he would file applications for arrest warrants against Hamas leaders Yahya Sinwar, Mohammed Deif and Ismail Haniyeh and Israeli leaders Prime Minister Benjamin Netanyahu and Minister of Defense Yoav Gallant. The request for a warrant against Haniyeh was withdrawn following his assassination on 31 July 2024, and the request for a warrant against Sinwar was withdrawn following his killing on 16 October 2024. The prosecutor stated that he was trying to confirm the alleged killing of Deif on 13 July 2024, in which case the warrant request would be withdrawn. The warrant for Deif was cancelled in February 2025, a few weeks after Hamas confirmed his death.

On 21 November 2024, the ICC's Preliminary Chamber I's Judges Nicolas Guillou (Presiding, France), Reine Alapini-Gansou (Benin) and Beti Hohler (Slovenia) issued arrest warrants under request from chief prosecutor Khan regarding "the activities of Israeli government bodies and the armed forces against the civilian population in Palestine, more specifically civilians in Gaza" for Benjamin Netanyahu, Yoav Gallant and Mohammed Deif.

Pre-Trial Chamber I stated that it found reasonable grounds that from "at least 8 October 2023 until at least 20 May 2024" Netanyahu and Gallant bear criminal responsibility "as co-perpetrators for committing the acts jointly with others: the war crime of starvation as a method of warfare; and the crimes against humanity of murder, persecution, and other inhumane acts" and "as civilian superiors for the war crime of intentionally directing an attack against the civilian population." and that Deif bears direct and command responsibility "for the crimes against humanity of murder, extermination, torture, and rape and other form of sexual violence; as well as the war crimes of murder, cruel treatment, torture, taking hostages, outrages upon personal dignity, and rape and other form of sexual violence". It found reasonable grounds that "the crimes against humanity were part of a widespread and systematic attack directed by Hamas and other armed groups against the civilian population of Israel".

One of the key allegations was the "use of starvation as a weapon of war". The use of starvation as weapon of war is banned by the United Nations. Since then it has been used in both Gaza and Sudan. In mid 2023 German government officials also accused Russia of using hunger as a weapon. Yoav Gallant made a public speech in early October 2023, shortly after the October 7 attacks that sparked the war, saying, "there will be no more electricity, no more food, no more fuel ... We are fighting against human animals and will behave accordingly." A few weeks before that the arrest warrants were issued, there were also reports of looting occurring in areas controlled by the IDF.

=== Potential future warrants ===
The Guardian reported on 28 April 2025 that Khan was preparing to seek arrest warrants for additional Israeli suspects, citing anonymous court officials familiar with the investigation. The report also claimed that ICC judges had issued a gag order forbidding Khan from publicly revealing that he had requested the warrants. The gag order was allegedly requested by members of Khan's staff who felt that his public announcements of the prior warrants for Netanyahu and Gallant "deviated from standard practice and put pressure on judges reviewing the warrant requests".

Prior to taking indefinite leave from the prosecutor's office in May 2025, Khan was reportedly preparing draft arrest warrants for Itamar Ben-Gvir and Bezalel Smotrich for their involvement in building illegal settlements. According to sources within the ICC, Khan had completed the warrant applications before taking his leave, but his deputies had not yet submitted them to the court.

In 2026, Haaretz reported that the Office of the Prosecutor had secretly requested arrest warrants for Ben-Gvir, Smotrich, Minister of Settlements Orit Strook, and two unnamed IDF officers. An ICC spokesperson called the report "inaccurate" and denied that any new warrants had been issued regarding the investigation in Palestine. Sources within the ICC told Middle East Eye that prosecutors had applied for an arrest warrant for Smotrich on 2 April and were considering whether to apply for additional warrants.

== Possible execution of the arrest warrants ==
=== Speculated January 2025 visit to Poland ===
In December 2024 and January 2025, the possibility of Netanyahu visiting Poland, party to the Rome Statute, on 27 January, the 80th anniversary of the liberation of Auschwitz concentration camp was discussed by Polish politicians. On 5 December 2024, Andrzej Szejna, the Deputy Minister of Foreign Affairs, stated at a Sejm sitting of the foreign affairs committee that Poland was obliged to cooperate with the ICC. He stated that heads of countries had no immunity in the ICC context. On 9 January 2025, Polish president Andrzej Duda requested the government led by Donald Tusk to protect Netanyahu from arrest were he to choose to attend the anniversary commemorations. On the same day, the government published a resolution stating that it would "guarantee the free and secure participation to the ceremony to the highest representatives of Israel" (Polish: zapewni wolny i bezpieczny dostęp i udział w tych obchodach najwyższym przedstawicielom Państwa Izrael). OKO.press commented that the government resolution did not name Netanyahu explicitly. Prime Minister Donald Tusk stated his interpretation of the resolution to the media, according to which any Israeli representative who made the visit, whether it were "the prime minister" or another leader, would not be detained.

An ICC spokesperson responded by stating that carrying out ICC decisions is obligatory to states parties towards both the ICC and to other states parties. The spokesperson stated that states with concerns about their obligations could consult with the ICC, but were not permitted to unilaterally determine the validity of the ICC's legal decisions. Legal scholars Karolina Wierczyńska, Piotr Hofmański and Omer Bartov stated that Netanyahu would have to be arrested if he visited Poland. Member of the Sejm Tomasz Trela stated that Netanyahu would have to be "instantly" arrested the moment he crossed the Polish border. Under Polish law, the Rome Statute is an international treaty obligation with legal priority above that of a Cabinet resolution. The procedure for an ICC fugitive is defined in Chapter 66e of the Polish criminal procedure law associated with the Polish Penal Code. According to legal scholar Hanna Kuczyńska, if an ICC fugitive arrived in Poland at the Kraków international airport, then the Minister of Justice would have to request a prosecutor to order that the person be detained by the police and brought to the Kraków district court, which would decide on the fugitive's transfer to The Hague. The district court's decision would be strongly constrained by the Rome Statute.

The International Centre of Justice for Palestinians sent letters to Polish authorities stating that it would "take immediate and robust legal action in Polish courts" if Polish legal obligations under the Rome Statute were not followed. It stated its view that "any attempt by the executive to pre-empt or obstruct judicial processes [would] represen[t] a serious breach of the rule of [Polish] law".

=== April 2025 visit to Hungary ===
Netanyahu arrived in Hungary on 3 April 2025. Hungarian Prime Minister Viktor Orbán had earlier invited Netanyahu to Hungary, shortly after the warrant was issued, stating the warrant would have "no effect" in Hungary. Prior to the visit, Amnesty International stated that Hungarian authorities would be obliged to arrest Netanyahu and deliver him to the ICC if he carried out his visit. The Hind Rajab Foundation (HRF) stated that it would call for injunctions to prevent Netanyahu flying through the airspace of European states parties to the Rome Statute and that it was coordinating with legal teams for Netanyahu to launch arrest procedures in case Netanyahu landed or passed through those states. HRF stated that it would request the Chief Prosecutor of Hungary to launch arrest procedures against Netanyahu according to Hungarian criminal law procedures that oblige Hungarian authorities to arrest ICC fugitives and transfer them to ICC custody.

During Netanyahu's visit, Orbán announced that Hungary would withdraw from the ICC. Per the Rome Statute, Hungary would need to formally notify the UN Secretary General. The withdrawal would become effective withdraw a year later. Hungary's obligation to arrest Netanyahu was unaffected by Orbán's announcement.

On 3 April, the ICJP submitted a formal complaint to the Hungarian Minister of Justice stating that the Hungarian authorities were obliged to arrest Netanyahu in line with Hungarian obligations as a state party to the Rome Statute, under Article 86 of the Statute requiring it to cooperate with the ICC.

=== September 2025 United Nations General Assembly ===
While en route to the 2025 United Nations General Assembly, the Wing of Zion plane used by Netanyahu flew a non-standard route to reach John F. Kennedy International Airport in New York City. The flight stayed out of French and Spanish airspace, likely to avoid jurisdictions which are signatories to the International Criminal Court. France has stated that he may have immunity as Israel is not a signatory.

=== December 2025 visit to the United States ===
Ynetnews wrote just prior to his December 2025 visit with President Trump in Florida that it was expected Netanyahu's plane would take a non-standard route, as with his previous visit to the United States.

=== January 2026 World Economic Forum ===
Netanyahu skipped the 56th World Economic Forum (Davos 2026) to avoid the arrest warrant. Davos is in Switzerland, which is a Rome Statute signatory.

=== September 2026 United Nations General Assembly ===
In a July 2026 statement describing Netanyahu as "a war criminal and the architect of a horrific genocide against the Palestinian people," New York City Mayor Zohran Mamdani announced that the city government did "not have the independent legal authority to enforce this warrant," an authority he said lay with the federal government, whom he called on to "join the ICC and execute this warrant."

On July 18, 2026, New York City mayor Zohran Mamdani was asked about his campaign promise to arrest Benjamin Netanyahu if he were to visit NYC during the early September 81st session of the UN General Assembly. Mamdani stated his belief "that Prime Minister Netanyahu belongs in The Hague" and said that he was consulting New York City Law Department over whether such an arrest would be legal in light of the ICC arrest warrant. On July 21, Mamdani stated that the US federal government has the authority to execute the arrest warrant but that New York City does not. He called on the federal government to make the arrest. In response, Trump said Netanyahu "will not be arrested under any circumstances."

On July 26, Netanyahu responded directly to Mamdani, stating that he would "come to New York to fight for the truth of the Jewish people" and accusing Mamdani of "fomenting hate", citing the death of a Jewish man among victims of stabbings on the Upper West Side on July 23. On July 28, Netanyahu announced Israel would have "special forces around" if he were to be arrested on his visit to New York.

== Legal analysis and commentary ==
International law professor Eliav Lieblich of Tel-Aviv University characterised the decision as "the most dramatic legal development in Israel's history", referring to his view that all 124 States Parties to the Rome Statute, including "most of Israel's closest allies", were legally obliged to arrest Netanyahu and Gallant if they are present in their territories. International law professors Matthias Goldmann and Kai Ambos said to Der Tagesspiegel that Germany was legally obliged to enforce the arrest warrants.

U.S. defense lawyer and professor Alan Dershowitz stated that the rule of law had been "disgraced" by the ICC's decision. He condemned the "false charges" and announced his intention to assemble a team of prominent lawyers to defend Israeli leaders in The Hague. Canadian human rights advocate and former justice minister Irwin Cotler criticized ICC Prosecutor Karim Khan for his approach toward Israeli leaders, asserting that Khan violated principles of cooperation and complementarity by issuing arrest warrants for them while being lenient toward Venezuelan leader Nicolás Maduro.

An article in the Journal of International Peacekeeping criticized the ICC for not including the crime against humanity of forced displacement among the charges against Israeli leaders.

Francesca Albanese, the UN special rapporteur on human rights in the occupied Palestinian territories, criticized countries that allowed Israeli Prime Minister Benjamin Netanyahu to fly through their airspace to the United States, saying they may have violated their obligations under international law.

=== Karim Khan misconduct allegation ===
In May 2024, the ICC started an investigation into allegations of sexual misconduct by Khan in relation to one of his assistants. The allegations were made public by a whistleblower in October 2024. A second allegation of sexual misconduct by Khan was made in August 2025. In November 2025, Israel requested that the ICC arrest warrants for Israeli leaders be dismissed on the basis of the allegations affecting Khan's impartiality. Khan stated that the allegations were a smear campaign aiming to disrupt the International Criminal Court investigation in Palestine.

Following conflicting determinations from an Office of Internal Oversight Services (OIOS) investigation and a review of that investigation's findings, the Assembly of States Parties Bureau voted to continue disciplinary proceedings against Khan. Khan was subsequently suspended from the ICC pending a vote on whether to remove him. In July 2026 the Assembly of States Parties of the ICC voted to remove Khan from office.

Khan announced the arrest warrants for the Israeli leaders two and a half weeks after he learned of the allegations against him, leading to questions about whether Khan made the announcement to protect himself. Khan's lawyers said that he had told U.S. State Department officials eight months before the arrest warrants were issued that he would apply for them. Prior to the issue of the warrants, the U.S. had worked to prevent them being issued. Khan's alleged victim said that her tried to get her to deny the allegations because the charges would damage the investigation of the Israeli leaders. Khan said that he was subject to efforts to destroy his reputation as a result of the arrest warrants.

== Reactions ==
Prime Minister of Israel
(@IsraeliPM)
tweeted:

The antisemitic decision of the International Criminal Court is a modern Dreyfus trial – and will end the same way.

Israel utterly rejects the false and absurd charges of the International Criminal Court, a biased and discriminatory political body.

www.gov.il/en/pages/spoke-hague211124

21 November 2024

=== Governments ===
==== Domestic ====
- Hamas: Hamas political bureau member Basem Naim welcomed the ICC's decision to issue arrest warrants for Netanyahu and Gallant as an "important step towards justice" and called on the ICC to expand its scope to other Israeli officials. Hamas did not mention the warrant for Mohammed Deif.
- Israel: The Israeli prime minister's office called the ICC arrest warrants against Netanyahu "antisemitic" and compared it to the Dreyfus affair. Netanyahu called it "blood libel". Foreign Minister Israel Katz claimed that the "ICC had lost its legitimacy." Knesset Foreign Affairs and Defence Committee Chairman Yuli Edelstein said that it was "a shameful decision by a political body held captive by Islamist interests."

Israeli opposition leader Yair Lapid condemned the ICC's decision.

- Palestinian Authority: The Palestinian Authority praised the ICC's decision and said that it "restores hope and confidence in international law and its institutions, and in the importance of justice, accountability and the prosecution of war criminals".

Following Israeli accusations about the neutrality of Judge Beti Hohler, the ICC responded that Hohler had no prior involvement in investigations related to Palestine while at the Office of the Prosecutor. Hohler added that she had "not accessed any documents, evidence, or secret files related to the matter."

==== International ====
- European Union: Foreign Policy chief Josep Borrell called on all EU member states to respect and implement the ICC's decision, arguing that the ICC's decision was not political.
- Algeria: The Foreign Ministry issued a statement regarding the Israelis that read "this action, long advocated by Algeria through President Abdelmadjid Tebboune, marks a significant step toward ending decades of impunity."
- Argentina: President Javier Milei said that Argentina "declares its deep disagreement" with the ICC's decision and that the arrest warrant "ignores Israel's legitimate right to self-defense".
- Australia: Foreign Minister Penny Wong stated in an X post that the Australian government "respects the independence of the ICC and its important role in upholding international law". The Leader of the Opposition, Peter Dutton, demanded that Australia resist the ICC's arrest warrant, threatening to cut ties with the international court whilst calling for "pressure on the ICC to make sure that this antisemitic stance that they’ve taken does not advance."
- Austria: Foreign Minister Alexander Schallenberg called the ICC arrest warrant "incomprehensible and ludicrous". However, Schallenberg's office also recognized that Austria, as a party of the Rome Statute, is obliged to implement ICC arrest warrants.
- Bangladesh: In a statement released in conjunction with a session of the Assembly of States Parties to the Rome Statute in December 2024, the Embassy of Bangladesh to the Netherlands wrote that "Bangladesh welcomes the issuance of arrest warrants" against Netanyahu and Gallant.
- Belgium: The Foreign Ministry said it "fully supports" international law and "will comply with" the warrant. In April 2025, Prime Minister Bart de Wever however stated that the country would be unlikely to arrest Netanyahu if he were on their territory, referring to "realpolitik." The statement prompted criticism from several opposition politicians and a human rights group. Three of the parties in the De Wever government reacted negatively to this statement, and foreign minister Maxime Prévot quickly reassured the ICC that the warrant would be upheld. Eventually, the governing parties came to a resolution in May to uphold the warrant.
- Belize: On 31 January 2025 Belize was among the founding countries of the Hague Group, a coalition of nine countries formed in defense of international law in relation to Israel and Palestine. Specifically, the countries pledged to "fulfill their obligations under the Rome Statute with respect to the warrants issued on 21 November 2024" against Gallant and Netanyahu, as well as to prevent arms sales to Israel.
- Bolivia: Foreign Minister Celinda Sosa stated that Bolivia welcomes the decision, which she described as "further compelling evidence of the genocide against the Palestinian people". On 31 January 2025 Bolivia was among the founding countries of the Hague Group, a coalition of nine countries formed in defense of international law in relation to Israel and Palestine. Specifically, the countries pledged to "fulfill their obligations under the Rome Statute with respect to the warrants issued on 21 November 2024" against Gallant and Netanyahu, as well as to prevent arms sales to Israel.
- Bulgaria: The Foreign Ministry, while giving its support to the "independence, integrity and objectivity" of the ICC, argued that the arrest warrants fail to distinguish between Israel and Hamas.
- Canada: Prime Minister Justin Trudeau said that Canada would "abide by international law". The Leader of the Opposition Pierre Poilievre rejected the legitimacy of the arrest warrants and criticised Trudeau for his position, arguing that Israel's democratic status should shield its leaders from prosecution. NDP Leader Jagmeet Singh strongly backed ICC proceedings. He asserted that Canada, as a signatory, has both a legal and moral duty to comply fully with the court, including execution of warrants if issued. In October 2025 Mark Carney, Trudeau's successor as Prime Minister, reiterated in an interview that Canada was still prepared to enforce the ICC warrant and arrest Netanyahu if he were to enter the country.
- Chile: In a statement, the Foreign Ministry wrote that it supports the work of the ICC and hopes that all states would "cooperate with its investigation and decisions", while calling on all parties in the conflict to "put an end to the grave violations of international humanitarian law and human rights".
- Colombia: President Gustavo Petro wrote that the ruling was "logical" and "must be complied with", calling Netanyahu "genocidal". He also stated that if U.S. President Joe Biden ignores the order, it would "lead the world into barbarism", and further called on Western European leaders to comply with the warrant. On 31 January 2025 Colombia was among the founding countries of the Hague Group, a coalition of nine countries formed in defense of international law in relation to Israel and Palestine. Specifically, the countries pledged to "fulfill their obligations under the Rome Statute with respect to the warrants issued on 21 November 2024" against Gallant and Netanyahu, as well as to prevent arms sales to Israel.
- Cuba: On 31 January 2025 Cuba was among the founding countries of the Hague Group, a coalition of nine countries formed in defense of international law in relation to Israel and Palestine. Specifically, the countries pledged to "fulfill their obligations under the Rome Statute with respect to the warrants issued on 21 November 2024" against Gallant and Netanyahu, as well as to prevent arms sales to Israel.
- Czech Republic: Prime Minister Petr Fiala called the order "unfortunate" and said it "undermines the authority" of the ICC in other cases. Foreign Ministry spokesperson Daniel Drake stated that the country "observes and will observe" its international legal obligations, and that Czech legal authorities will decide on the implementation of the arrest warrants.
- Denmark: Foreign Minister Lars Løkke Rasmussen told media that Denmark is "a firm supporter" of the ICC and its independence, and that the country "naturally" would comply with its obligations under international law.
- Djibouti: In a speech before the Assembly of States Parties to the Rome Statute on 4 December 2024, Djibouti's ambassador to Belgium Aden Mohamed Dileita said his country "fully welcomes" the decision of the ICC. Dileita added that the country "observes with concern the unease" caused among several of the state parties by the warrants, and stressed that "there can be no double standards in justice."
- Egypt: Foreign Minister Badr Abdelatty emphasized the necessity of respecting decisions made by international bodies, including the ICC arrest warrant for Netanyahu and Gallant.
- Estonia: Foreign Minister Margus Tsahkna acknowledged the arrest warrants and Estonia's obligations as a state party to the ICC, but also voiced scepticism that the order would contribute to "a lasting peace in the Middle East."
- Finland: Foreign Minister Elina Valtonen noted that Finland, as a states party to the ICC, has "an obligation to cooperate with the court based on the Rome Statute. This also includes the obligation to arrest the subjects of arrest warrants if they travel to contracting states."
- France: Foreign Ministry spokesperson Christophe Lemoine said that France would act "in line with the ICC's statuses", but declined to say whether Netanyahu would be arrested if he entered France, stating that it's "legally complex". Foreign Minister Jean-Noël Barrot later appeared to confirm that the wanted subjects would be arrested if they enter French soil, responding to a direct question that "France will always apply international law." On 27 November, the French Foreign Ministry released a statement saying that Israeli leaders may be protected by immunity rules that apply to states not party to the ICC.
- Germany: A government spokesperson stated that Germany will "carefully examine" the arrest warrants for Netanyahu and Gallant, but that further steps would not be taken until a visit by any of the two to the country. The spokesperson further said that Germany is one of the "biggest supporters" of the ICC, but also recalled the close relationship between Germany and Israel. Friedrich Merz, Germany's Chancellor since May 2025, stated after the country's elections in February of the same year that he would find "ways and means" for Netanyahu to be able to visit Germany without risking arrest. In May, Merz stated that he "no longer understands" Israel's policy in Gaza, however he did not formally retract the invitation.
- Greece: Government spokesperson Pavlos Marinakis expressed disapproval with the arrest warrants against Netanyahu and Gallant, saying that the ICC's decision "will solve no problem." When asked if Greece would still follow its obligations as per the Rome Statute and implement the warrants if the subjects should enter the country, Marinakis refrained from giving a direct answer.
- Honduras: On 31 January 2025 Honduras was among the founding countries of the Hague Group, a coalition of nine countries formed in defense of international law in relation to Israel and Palestine. Specifically, the countries pledged to "fulfill their obligations under the Rome Statute with respect to the warrants issued on 21 November 2024" against Gallant and Netanyahu, as well as to prevent arms sales to Israel.
- Hungary: Former prime minister Viktor Orbán said he would not carry out the warrants, calling them "brazen and cynical" and accusing the ICC's order of being issued "for political purposes". In April 2025, Netanyahu made a state visit to Hungary, where he was not arrested; during the visit, Prime Minister Orbán announced his intention to withdraw Hungary from the ICC over the arrest warrants, sparking international criticism and prompting the ICC to open an inquiry.

In April 2026 Hungary's then-prime minister-elect Péter Magyar, who succeeded Orbán in May, announced he would halt his country's withdrawal from the ICC. At that point, Netanyahu had already accepted an invitation for another visit to Hungary during the fall; when asked how this would affect the planned visit, Magyar stated that, if the subject of an ICC arrest warrant enters the territory of a state party to the ICC, "then that person must be taken into custody."

- Iceland: Foreign Minister Þórdís Kolbrún R. Gylfadóttir said that Iceland respects the ICC's decision.
- Indonesia: The Foreign Ministry supported the arrest warrant as an important step to achieve "justice for crimes against humanity and war crimes in Palestine", further emphasizing that the warrants "must be carried out" in accordance with international law.
- Iran: Islamic Revolutionary Guards Corps General Hossein Salami said: "This means the end and political death of the Zionist regime, a regime that today lives in absolute political isolation in the world and its officials can no longer travel to other countries." Supreme leader Ayatollah Ali Khamenei later stated his opinion that a war crimes case against Netanyahu and Gallant was insufficient, and that "the death sentence of these criminal leaders should be issued."
- Iraq: Government spokesperson Basim al-Awadi expressed support for the arrest warrants against Netanyahu and Gallant, calling the ICC's decision "courageous and just".
- Ireland: Taoiseach Simon Harris called the arrest warrants "an extremely significant step", while affirming Ireland's respect for the ICC and stating that anyone in a position to assist it in its work must do so "with urgency."
- Italy: Foreign Minister Antonio Tajani said that Italy supports the ICC, and that it would consider with allies how to interpret the decision and act. Separately, Defense Minister Guido Crosetto said that if Netanyahu and Gallant "were to come to Italy, we would have to arrest them". On 15 January 2025, according to an anonymous source at a meeting of the Italian foreign and justice ministers with the Israeli foreign minister, the Italian ministers stated that Netanyahu would not be arrested if he visited Italy.
- Jordan: Foreign Minister Ayman Safadi said the ICC's decision must be respected and implemented and that "Palestinians deserve justice".
- Latvia: The Ministry of Foreign Affairs stated that Latvia "respects the court's decisions" and confirmed that this would also apply to the ICC warrants for Netanyahu and Gallant.
- Lebanon: The Foreign Ministry welcomed the decision to issue arrest warrants for Netanyahu and Gallant, stating that it "restores respect for international legitimacy and the concept of justice and international laws" and constitutes "a clear condemnation of the crimes committed by Israel against civilians."
- Lithuania: The Foreign Ministry confirmed that the arrest warrant would be executed.
- Luxembourg: The government stated to the news outlet Letzland that Luxembourg “attaches paramount importance to respecting the independence and impartiality of the ICC, and will implement all of its obligations arising from the Rome Statute.”
- Malaysia: Prime Minister Anwar Ibrahim stated that his country welcomes the ICC's decision, which he described as "a victory for those who uphold justice and humanity". On 31 January 2025 Malaysia was among the founding countries of the Hague Group, a coalition of nine countries formed in defense of international law in relation to Israel and Palestine. Specifically, the countries pledged to "fulfill their obligations under the Rome Statute with respect to the warrants issued on 21 November 2024" against Gallant and Netanyahu, as well as to prevent arms sales to Israel.
- Namibia: The Foreign Ministry welcomed the decision to issue arrest warrants against Netanyahu and Gallant, and called on all UN member states to cooperate with the ICC. On 31 January 2025 Namibia was among the founding countries of the Hague Group, a coalition of nine countries formed in defense of international law in relation to Israel and Palestine. Specifically, the countries pledged to "fulfill their obligations under the Rome Statute with respect to the warrants issued on 21 November 2024" against Gallant and Netanyahu, as well as to prevent arms sales to Israel.
- Netherlands: In November 2024, foreign minister Caspar Veldkamp declared that the Netherlands "implements the Rome Statute 100 percent", becoming the first country to say that it is prepared to act upon the ICC arrest warrants.
- New Zealand: In response to a question from a reporter asking if New Zealand would arrest Netanyahu and Gallant if they came to the country, Prime Minister Christopher Luxon stated: "Yes, we support the ICC. […] We believe in the international rules-based system, we support the ICC, and we would be obligated to do so."
- Norway: Foreign Minister Espen Barth Eide stated, "It is important that the ICC carries out its mandate in a judicious manner. I have confidence that the court will proceed with the case based on the highest fair trial standards." State Secretary Andreas Kravik later confirmed to media that, if Netanyahu or any other subject of an ICC arrest warrant enters Norway, the country will "arrest and extradite the person concerned."
- Paraguay: In a press release, the Foreign Ministry said that it "regrets" the arrest warrants against Netanyahu and Gallant, adding that the Paraguayan government "energetically rejects" what it considers to be "the political instrumentalization of international law".
- Poland: In December 2024 Deputy Foreign Minister Władysław Bartoszewski told media that, if he enters Poland, Netanyahu would be arrested in accordance with the country's commitments to the ICC, making Netanyahu's attendance at the forthcoming 80th anniversary of the liberation of Auschwitz unlikely. In January 2025 the Polish government changed its position, with Prime Minister Donald Tusk interpreting the government resolution as implying that Netanyahu would not be detained should he visit during the anniversary, despite the arrest warrant.
- Portugal: Foreign Minister Paulo Rangel assured that Portugal will comply with its international obligations "if that question arises" regarding the enforcement of ICC arrest warrants against Netanyahu and Gallant.
- Romania: The Foreign Ministry published a post on X saying that it supports international law and the independence of the ICC, while also arguing that "there is no equivalence" between Israel on the one hand, and Hamas and Hezbollah on the other.
- Senegal: On 31 January 2025 Senegal was among the founding countries of the Hague Group, a coalition of nine countries formed in defense of international law in relation to Israel and Palestine. Specifically, the countries pledged to "fulfill their obligations under the Rome Statute with respect to the warrants issued on 21 November 2024" against Gallant and Netanyahu, as well as to prevent arms sales to Israel.
- Slovenia: Prime Minister Robert Golob stated that Slovenia "will fully comply" with the arrest warrants.
- South Africa: South Africa welcomed the ICC's decision and called it a "significant step toward justice for crimes against humanity and war crimes in Palestine". On 31 January 2025 South Africa was among the founding countries of the Hague Group, a coalition of nine countries formed in defense of international law in relation to Israel and Palestine. Specifically, the countries pledged to "fulfill their obligations under the Rome Statute with respect to the warrants issued on 21 November 2024" against Gallant and Netanyahu, as well as to prevent arms sales to Israel.
- Spain: The Foreign Ministry stated that Spain "respects" the ICC's decision, confirming that the country "will comply with its commitments and obligations in relation to the Rome Statute and international law".
- South Korea: In May 2026, South Korean President Lee Jae Myung called Netanyahu a "war criminal" and ordered in the South Korean government to make a judgement on whether to issue an arrest warrant for Netanyahu in accordance with the ICC arrest warrant.
- Sweden: Foreign Minister Maria Malmer Stenergard stated that her country and the EU "support the court's important work and protect its independence and integrity", adding that Swedish legal authorities will decide on the arrest of subjects of ICC warrants.
- Switzerland: The Federal Office of Justice said that it is obliged to cooperate with the ICC as per the Rome Statute, and therefore would arrest Netanyahu, Gallant or Masri if they entered Switzerland.
- Turkey: President Recep Tayyip Erdoğan stated his support for the International Criminal Court's arrest warrants against Netanyahu and Gallant, and called on the 124 ICC member states to arrest them.

Foreign Minister Hakan Fidan called the ICC arrest warrant "hopeful" and a crucial step in bringing Israeli authorities to justice for their "genocide" against Palestinians, adding: "We will continue to work to ensure that international law is implemented to punish genocide."

- United Kingdom: Prime Minister Keir Starmer's spokesperson said that the British government respects the independence of the International Criminal Court and indicated that Netanyahu would face arrest if he entered the United Kingdom.

Ruling Labour Party MPs and other opposition leaders from the Liberal Democrats' Ed Davey, Independent Jeremy Corbyn, and the Green Party supported the ICC's decision, while some called for either sanctions or a ceasefire as well. The main opposition party, the Conservative Party, urged Starmer to condemn the arrest warrants, calling them "concerning and provocative".

- United States: The White House said the United States "fundamentally rejects" the ICC's decision to issue arrest warrants, and added that "the ICC does not have jurisdiction over this matter". President Joe Biden called the arrest warrant for Netanyahu "outrageous". In January 2025, the U.S. House of Representatives passed a bill sanctioning the ICC in protest at the arrest warrants for Netanyahu and Gallant.

Senator Lindsey Graham (R-SC) called the ICC a "dangerous joke" and for sanctions on the ICC in a bill already proposed. He also wrote on social media, calling on Senator Chuck Schumer (D-NY) "that Congress needs to pass the bipartisan legislation that came from the House sanctioning the Court for such an outrage and President Biden needs to sign it." Representative Michael Waltz (R-FL) added that "The ICC has no credibility and these allegations have been refuted by the US government." Senator Tom Cotton (R-AR) called for military force, according to the domestic law The Hague Invasion Act, to use "all means necessary and appropriate." Senator John Fetterman (D-PA) wrote on social media that the ICC has "No standing, relevance, or path. Fuck that." His colleagues, Representative Jared Moskowitz (D-FL) accused the ICC of having an "antisemitic double standard," Senator Jacky Rosen (D-NV) called on Biden to "use his authority to swiftly respond to this overreach" and Representative Ritchie Torres (D-NY) accused the ICC of "criminalizing self-defence."
Representative Rashida Tlaib (D-MI) said that the ICC's "long overdue decision to issue arrest warrants for Netanyahu and Gallant for war crimes and crimes against humanity signals that the days of the Israeli apartheid government operating with impunity are ending." Senator Bernie Sanders (I-VT) expressed his support for the warrants, describing the ICC's charges as well-founded and warning that "If the world does not uphold international law, we will descend into further barbarism." Dearborn mayor Abdullah Hammoud stated that he would uphold the ICC's decision and local police would arrest Netanyahu if he entered the city, despite the U.S. not being a party member of the ICC. New York City 2025 mayoral Democratic nominee Zohran Mamdani also vowed to arrest Netanyahu if he visited the city under Mamdani's administration, to which Netanyahu responded that he would come to the city regardless.
In February 2025, the second Donald Trump administration signed Executive Order 14203 sanctioning ICC personnel with asset freezes and travel bans. The Executive Order followed the failure to pass sanctions in the legislature against the ICC for its Benjamin Netanyahu arrest warrant.

== See also ==
- Gaza Strip famine
- Gaza genocide
- Palestinian genocide accusation
- ICC arrest warrants for Russian leaders
- List of people indicted in the International Criminal Tribunal for Rwanda
- List of people indicted in the International Criminal Tribunal for the former Yugoslavia
- List of people indicted in the International Criminal Court
- Arrest of Rodrigo Duterte
