= Hague Group =

Group of states for the upholding of international law

- Names in other languages: مجموعة لاهاي (Arabic); 海牙小组 (Chinese); Groupe de La Haye (French); Grupo de Haia (Portuguese); Гаагская группа (Russian); Grupo de La Haya (Spanish)
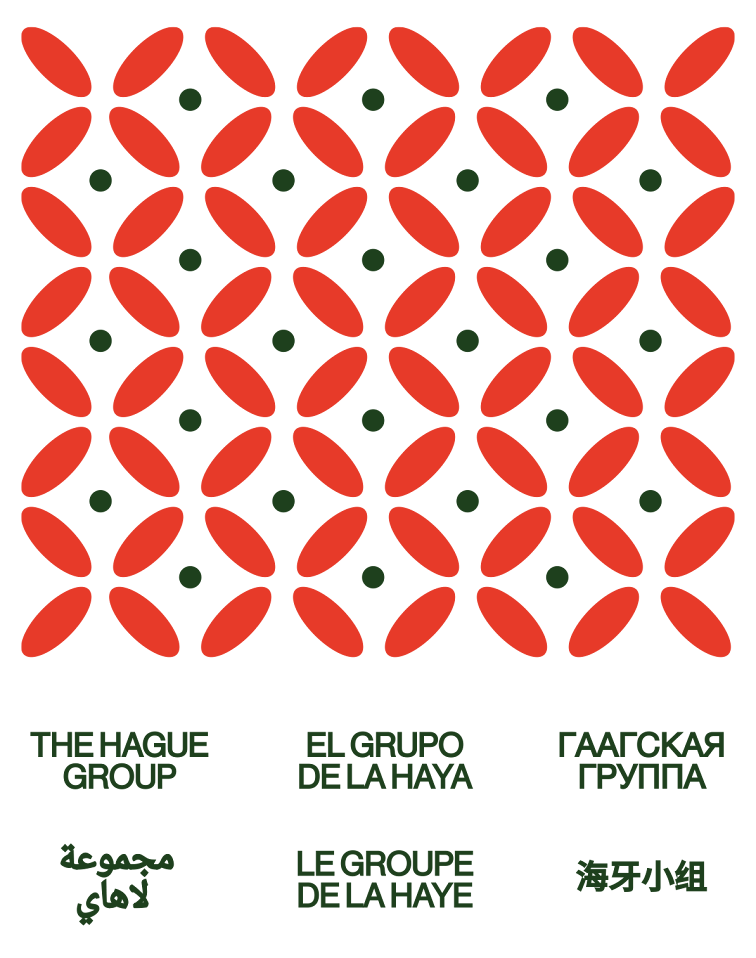

- current members former members
- Named after: The Hague, Netherlands (seat of the ICC and ICJ)
- Formation: 31 January 2025; 21 months ago
- Founder: Progressive International
- Founded at: The Hague, Netherlands
- Type: International organization
- Purpose: Upholding international law
- Members: 5: Chair: South Africa; Other: Cuba; Malaysia; Namibia; Senegal; Former: Belize; Bolivia; Colombia; Honduras
- Executive secretary: Varsha Gandikota-Nellutla
- Website: thehaguegroup.org

The Hague Group (Note: In other languages: Arabic: مجموعة لاهاي, romanized: Majmūʿat Lāhāy; Chinese: 海牙小組 (traditional) / 海牙小组 (simplified), pinyin: Hǎiyá xiǎozǔ; French: Groupe de La Haye; Portuguese: Grupo de Haia; Russian: Гаагская группа, romanized: Gaagksaya gruppa; Spanish: Grupo de La Haya.; Arabic, Chinese, English, French, Russian and Spanish are the six official languages of the United Nations, and are used in the group's logo. In addition, Portuguese is one of the four languages in which the group's media is available alongside English, French, Spanish and Arabic.) is a group of nations from the Global South formed on 31 January 2025 to protect and uphold the rulings of the International Court of Justice (ICJ) and the International Criminal Court (ICC), both located in The Hague, Netherlands, in relation to the Israeli–Palestinian conflict.

== Creation and aims ==
The group, convened by Progressive International, declared its creation on 31 January 2025 in The Hague, amid the Gaza war. The group was founded by nine member states: Belize, Bolivia, Colombia, Cuba, Honduras, Malaysia, Namibia, Senegal and South Africa. The founding members invited several other countries to join, including Spain.

Varsha Gandikota-Nellutla, Co-General Coordinator of Progressive International and Acting Chair of the Hague Group, described the motivation to create the group: "The Hague Group is born of necessity. In a world where powerful nations act with impunity, we must stand together to defend the principles of justice, equality and human rights." South Africa's Minister of International Relations and Cooperation, Ronald Lamola, said: "The Hague Group's formation sends a clear message: no nation is above the law, and no crime will go unanswered." According to its inaugural statement, the group upholds national obligations to "end the Israeli occupation of the State of Palestine and support the realisation of the inalienable right of the Palestinian people to self-determination, including the right to their independent State of Palestine."

The member states agreed to prevent the provision or transfer of weapons, ammunition and related equipment to Israel in all cases where there is a clear risk that these weapons would be used to commit or facilitate violations of international humanitarian law or genocide. The countries announced that they would prevent ships used to transport weapons or military fuel to Israel from docking at any of their ports. At the launch of the Hague Group, Gandikota-Nellutla said, "By coordinating commitments across our ports, across our factories, across our courts, the Hague Group aims to build a bulwark to defend international law." Supporters present at the launch event included members of independent UN commissions, human rights lawyers, and parliamentarians from several countries including Yanis Varoufakis and Jeremy Corbyn.

== Legal rulings ==
The group referred to several different legal rulings in its inaugural statement, arguing that Israel's actions constitute genocide and violations of international law. The group states that it is the legal duty of all states to prevent such crimes. They referred to United Nations resolutions, including the United Nations Security Council Resolution 418 of 1977 ordering an obligatory arms embargo against South Africa, for context.

The group members announced their intention to support the International Criminal Court (ICC) regarding the arrest warrants it issued against Israeli prime minister Benjamin Netanyahu and his former defense minister Yoav Gallant as part of the court's investigation in Palestine for events since June 2014.

The group stated that it would support the implementation of the January, March and May 2024 provisional measures ordered by the International Court of Justice (ICJ) in South Africa's genocide case against Israel and the 19 July 2024 ruling in the ICJ case on Israel's occupation of the Palestinian territories.

== Membership ==
The Hague Group was initially created with nine member states; within one month, founding member Belize withdrew. On 3 April 2025, United Nations human rights experts, including special rapporteurs Francesca Albanese, Tlaleng Mofokeng, and Jovana Jezdimirovic Ranito, called for more states to join the Hague Group because of their concern that lack of action was putting the international legal system at risk.

In mid-July 2025, the Chamber of Deputies of Chile approved a resolution urging president Gabriel Boric to join the Hague Group. By the end of Boric's mandate, Chile had yet to join the group.

On 4 March 2026, Honduras and Bolivia announced their withdrawal from the Hague Group. In August 2026, Colombia, former co-chair of the group, left the Hague Group.

Founding state representatives
| Name | Title | Member state | Refs. |
|---|---|---|---|
| Assad Shoman | Special Envoy of the Prime Minister on Sovereignty Matters | Belize | |
| Roberto Calzadilla | Ambassador to the Netherlands | Bolivia | |
| Carolina Olarte-Bácares | Ambassador to the Netherlands | Colombia | |
| Isaura Cabañas Vera | Chargée d'affaires, Cuban Embassy, Netherlands | Cuba | |
| Mariam Tavassoli Zea | Advisor to the Minister of Foreign Affairs | Honduras | |
| Roseli Bin Abdul | Ambassador to the Netherlands | Malaysia | |
| Yvonne Dausab | Minister of Justice | Namibia | |
| Ramatoulaye Ba Epse Faye | Ambassador to the Netherlands | Senegal | |
| Ronald Lamola | Minister of International Relations and Cooperation | South Africa | |

== Actions ==
The Group prepared an emergency meeting in Bogotá on 15–16 July 2025, during which member states planned to announce coordinated concrete actions for enforcing international law. Representatives of over 30 countries, including Brazil, China, Indonesia, Ireland, Mexico, Norway, Pakistan Portugal, Qatar, Spain, and Turkey, attended the meeting.

As a result of the meeting, 12 of the participating states declared that they would carry out six measures in relation to blocking arms supplies, preventing institutional and funding support for the Israeli occupation of Palestinian territorites, and supporting legal investigations and prosecutions in relation to international crimes committed in Palestine. For the remaining states in attendance, a deadline of September 2025 was proposed, in accordance with the 12-month timeframe mandated by UN General Assembly Resolution A/RES/ES-10/24, adopted on 18 September 2024.

On 26 September 2025, during Netanyahu's speech at the 80th UN General Assembly, the Hague Group convened a ministerial meeting of 34 countries (namely the member states minus Senegal plus Algeria, Antigua and Barbuda, Brazil, Chile, Comoros, Djibouti, Guyana, Iceland, Indonesia, Iraq, Ireland, Jordan, Kuwait, Maldives, Mexico, Nicaragua, Norway, Oman, Palestine, Qatar, Saint Vincent and the Grenadines, Saudi Arabia, Slovenia, Spain, Turkey, Uruguay and Venezuela) to discuss further coordinated measures against Israel. The meeting came after the Independent International Commission of Inquiry on the Occupied Palestinian Territory officially recognized the Israeli genocide in the Gaza, and Israel's disregard for the ICJ's advisory opinion of July 2024, which had given it twelve months to put an end to its occupation. During the meeting, Brazil's foreign minister Mauro Vieira proposed the establishment of an international mission on the model of the UN Special Committee against Apartheid, which was created to put pressure on the government of apartheid South Africa.
