= Andrew Cayley =

Andrew Thomas Cayley
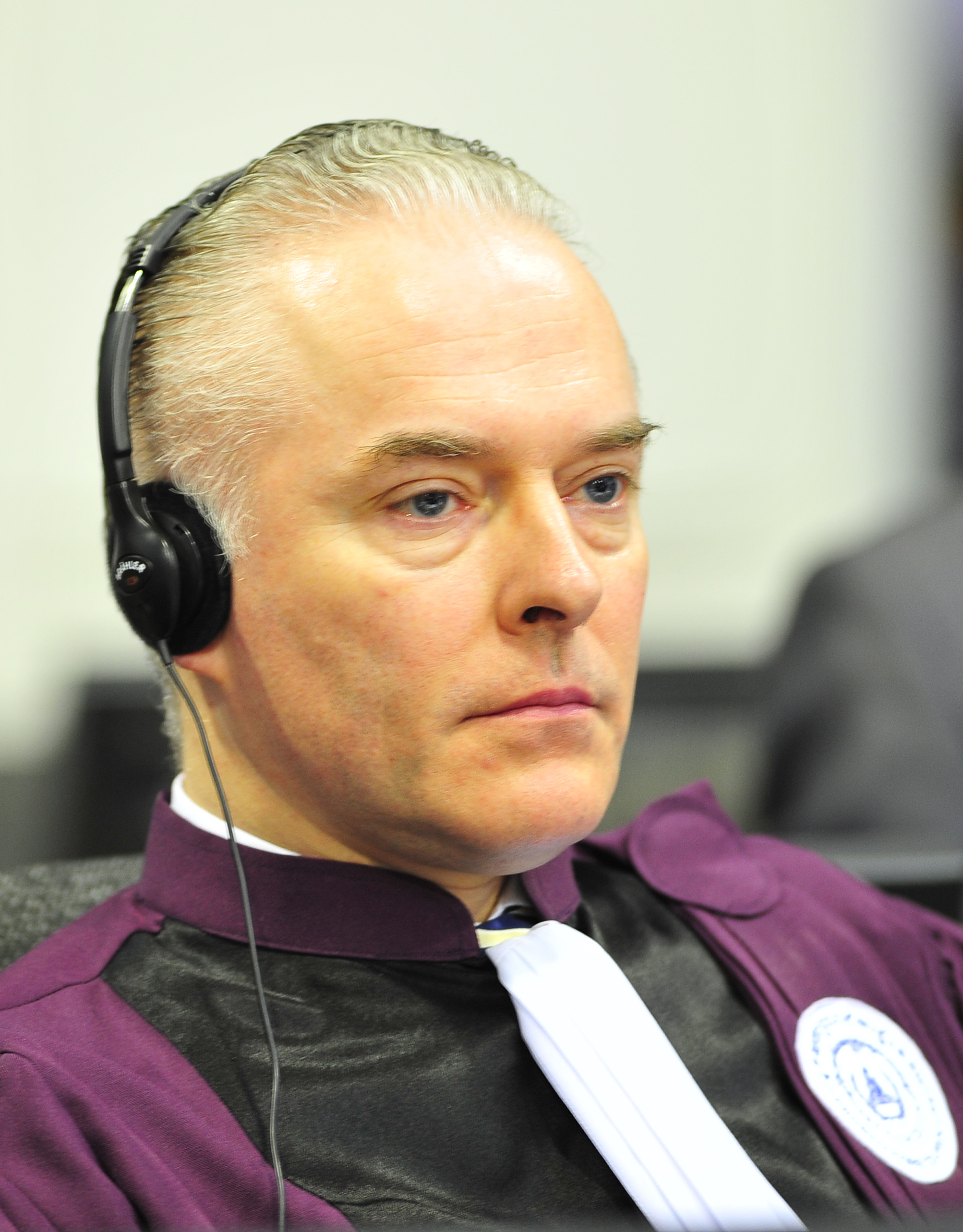
- Andrew Cayley (2011)
- Born: 1964 (age 61–62)

Andrew Thomas Cayley, CMG KC FRSA (born 1964), is a lawyer who was the International Chief Prosecutor of the Khmer Rouge Tribunal from 2009 to 2013, the United Kingdom Director of Service Prosecutions( its chief military prosecutor) from 2013 to 2020 and His Majesty's Chief Inspector of the Crown Prosecution Service from 2021 until February 2024. He was a Principal Trial Lawyer at the ICC from February 2024 until March 2025. He is now in private practice at Temple Garden Chambers.

Prior to this he was a Trial Attorney and then Senior Trial Attorney at the International Criminal Tribunal for the former Yugoslavia (ICTY) and the International Criminal Court in The Hague between 1995 and 2007. He was junior prosecuting counsel in the trial that led to the ICTY's first conviction for genocide in respect of events at Srebrenica in July 1995. He drafted the indictment on which Colonel General Ratko Mladic stood trial. He led in the only successful prosecution at ICTY of members of the Kosovo Liberation Army. At the ICC he was responsible for the investigation and prosecution of serious violations of international humanitarian law in the Darfur region of Sudan.

== Education ==
Cayley was educated at Brighton College and then University College London (LL.M 1986) and the College of Law Guildford ( Law Society's Solicitors Final Examination 1988). He was admitted as a Solicitor of the Supreme Court of the Judicature of England and Wales in 1989. In 2007 he was called by the Inner Temple to the Bar of England and Wales. After a period in private practice, as a solicitor, until 1991 with the law firm Thomas Eggar, he served with the Army Legal Services of the British Army first on attachment to the Kings Own Royal Border Regiment in Belize and then as a military prosecutor and command legal adviser in Germany and the United Kingdom. He attended the Professionally Qualified Officers' Course at the Royal Military Academy Sandhurst.

== Experience ==
Placed on loan service in 1995, as a military prosecutor, by the Foreign & Commonwealth Office and the Ministry of Defence to the International Criminal Tribunal for the Former Yugoslavia (ICTY) he investigated and prosecuted the cases of The Prosecutor v. Colonel Ivica Rajic (Stupni Dol), The Prosecutor v. Colonel Tihomil Blaskic, the Prosecutor v. General Radoslav Krstic (Srebrenica)and The Prosecutor v Radoslav Brdanin and General Momir Talic. He retired from the British Army in 1998 and was immediately appointed as prosecuting counsel with the ICTY. In 2001 he was appointed a Senior Trial Attorney of the International Criminal Tribunal for the Former Yugoslavia by Carla Del Ponte, Prosecutor of the ICTY. In that capacity he was responsible for the case against General Ratko Mladic and led the first prosecution of members of the Kosovo Liberation Army.

In February 2005, he was appointed Senior Trial Attorney at the International Criminal Court (ICC) by the Prosecutor Luis Moreno Ocampo. In 2007 after filing the first case for war crimes and crimes against humanity in Darfur he left the ICC and was immediately instructed by Ivan Cermak to defend him in his case before the ICTY and by the former President of Liberia Charles Taylor in his defence before the Special Court for Sierra Leone.

From 2009 to 2013, Cayley was Chief International Co-Prosecutor of the Extraordinary Chambers in the Courts of Cambodia, the Khmer Rouge Tribunal, where he led for the United Nations on the prosecution of the former leadership of the Khmer Rouge for the genocide, extermination and murder of up to two million of their own citizens in Cambodia between 1975 and 1979.

As Director Service Prosecutions, between 2013 and 2020, he was the United Kingdom's Chief Military Prosecutor. In this role he was responsible for the prosecution of members of the Royal Navy, Army and Royal Air Force for serious criminal and service disciplinary offences. He led the legal team which succeeded in closing the ICC's Preliminary Examination of allegations of war crimes by British Forces in Iraq from 2003 to 2009.

Cayley was appointed King's Counsel in 2012. He was appointed Companion of the Order of St Michael and St George (CMG) in the 2014 Birthday Honours for services to international criminal law and human rights. Also in 2014 he became a governing Bencher of the Honourable Society of the Inner Temple. He was appointed Fellow of the Royal Society of Arts in 2017. He is a member of Temple Garden Chambers.

In March 2024, together with US lawyer Brenda Hollis, he was appointed to manage the International Criminal Court investigation in Palestine. Cayley resigned from the ICC in March 2025.
