= Keebong Paek =

South Korean jurist (born 1964)

Judge of the International Criminal Court
- Incumbent
- Assumed office 11 March 2024
- Nominated by: South Korea
- Appointed by: Assembly of States Parties

Personal details
- Born: 19 December 1964 (age 61)

Keebong Paek (Note: The native form of this Korean name is Paek Keebong. This article uses Western name order because the individual is widely referred to in this form in his profession.) (Korean: 백기봉; Hanja: 白奇峯; born 19 December 1964) is a South Korean jurist who has been serving as a judge of the International Criminal Court since March 2024.
