= Haykel Ben Mahfoudh =

Tunisian jurist (born 1971)

Judge of the International Criminal Court
- Incumbent
- Assumed office 11 March 2024
- Nominated by: Tunisia
- Appointed by: Assembly of States Parties

Personal details
- Born: 24 September 1971 (age 54)

Haykel Ben Mahfoudh (born 24 September 1971) is a Tunisian jurist who has been serving as a judge of the International Criminal Court since March 2024.

== Tenure at the ICC ==
In June 2024, Ben Mahfoudh was among three judges of the ICC who issued arrest warrants against former Russian defence minister Sergei Shoigu and Chief of General Staff Valery Gerasimov for war crimes in committed during the Russian invasion of Ukraine. In response, Russian authorities opened an investigation against him and ordered his arrest in November 2024.
