= Mirjana Lazarova Trajkovska =

Macedonian judge (born 1963)

Judge of the European Court of Human Rights in respect of Macedonia
- In office 1 February 2008 – 2017

Personal details
- Born: 11 May 1963 (age 62) Strumica, Macedonia

Mirjana Lazarova Trajkovska (born 11 May 1963) is a Macedonian judge born in Strumica, North Macedonia. She was the judge of the European Court of Human Rights in respect of North-Macedonia from 2008 to 2017.
