= Iulia Motoc =

Romanian judge (born 1967)

Iulia Antoanella Motoc KSR
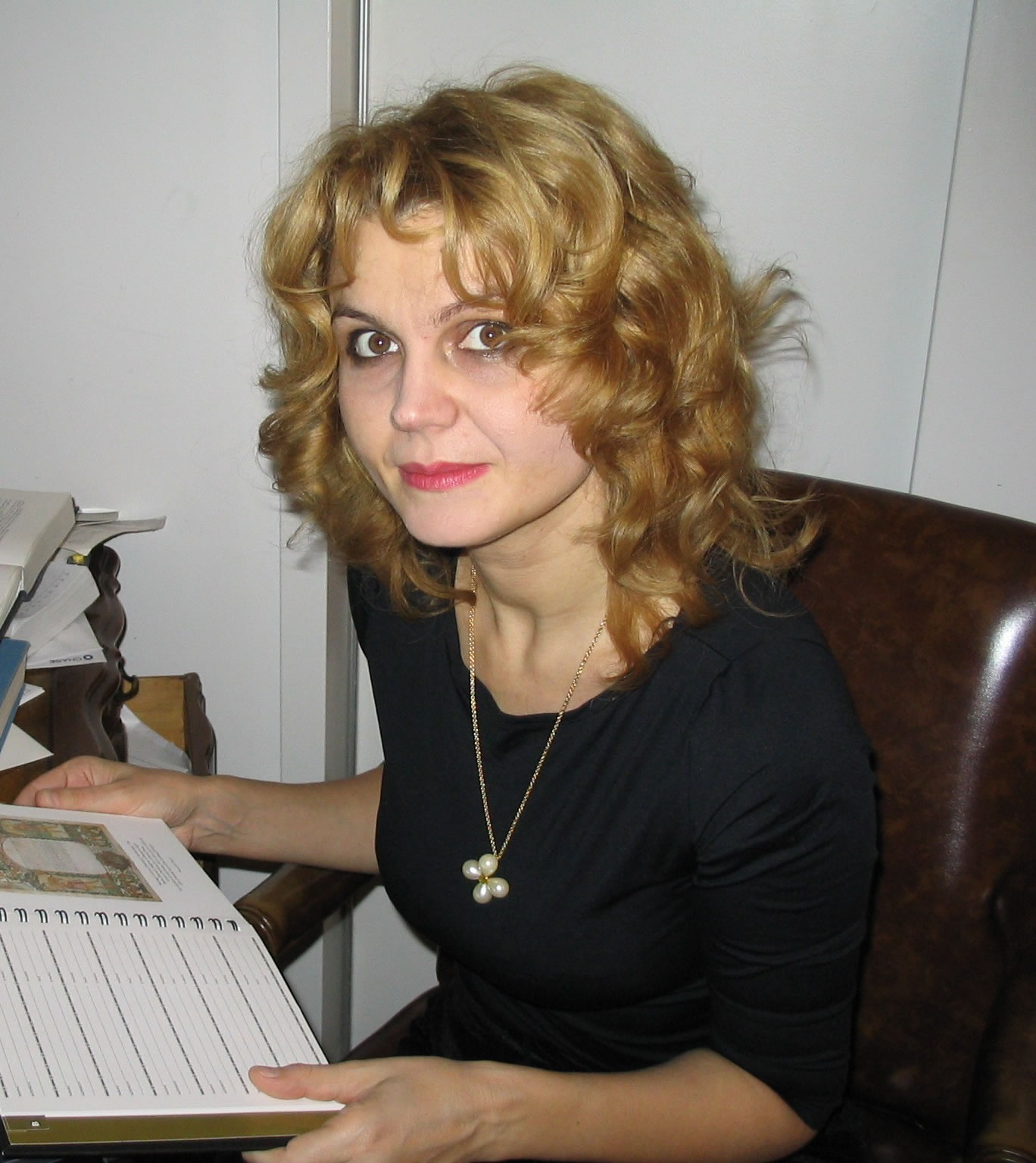
- Motoc in 2013

Judge of the International Criminal Court
- Incumbent
- Assumed office 11 March 2024
- Nominated by: Romania
- Appointed by: Assembly of States Parties

Judge at the European Court of Human Rights
- In office 18 December 2013 – 2 July 2023
- Nominated by: Parliamentary Assembly of the Council of Europe
- Preceded by: Corneliu Birsan
- Succeeded by: Sebastian Rădulețu

Judge at the Constitutional Court of Romania
- In office 15 June 2010 – 17 December 2013
- Succeeded by: Toni Greblă

Personal details
- Born: 20 August 1967 (age 58) Timișoara, Romania
- Spouse: Mihnea Motoc
- Children: Luca-Mihnea Motoc
- Occupation: Judge at European Court of Human Rights, professor and lawyer

Iulia Antoanella Motoc (born 20 August 1967) is a Romanian judge and international law expert, currently a judge of the International Criminal Court. Motoc is the first Romanian judge elected to the International Criminal Court.

Before beginning her service at the court, she was a judge at the European Court of Human Rights, a professor at the University of Bucharest and a judge at the Constitutional Court of Romania.

Motoc was UN Special Rapporteur for the Democratic Republic of the Congo and she chaired a number of international experts bodies and was vice-president of the UN Human Rights Committee. On 1 October 2013, the Parliamentary Assembly of the Council of Europe elected Motoc a judge of the European Court of Human Rights with respect to Romania. She received an absolute majority of votes cast by parliamentarians. Her nine-year term of office began on 18 December 2013.

In August 2021, she was the first Romanian elected as a member of the Institut de Droit International.

On 28 March 2023, following a selection process, she was chosen by the Romanian government to be Romania's candidate for the post of judge at the International Criminal Court.

Motoc is a generalist in public international law, writing on the theory of international law, use of force and human rights. She taught a special course The Hague Academy of International Law in 2024.

== Early life and education ==
Iulia Motoc was born in Timișoara. She graduated from the school of law at the University of Bucharest. Iulia Antoanella Motoc holds a master's degree from the Paul Cézanne University School of Law, Aix-Marseille (1991) a doctorate in international law from Paul Cézanne University, Aix-Marseille (summa cum laude) in 1996 an habilitation in law from Jean Monnet Department University of Paris-Sud (1998) in and a doctorate in ethics from the University of Bucharest, Department of Philosophy (1999).

She defended her doctoral thesis on "The interpretation of the exceptions to Article 2 para. 4 of the UN Charter by the Security Council" in June 1996 under the supervision of Professor Maurice Flory at the Paul Cézanne University. Her jury awarded her an honorable mention with the unanimous congratulations of the Jury. Iulia Motoc was also a fellow in philosophy to the Institut für die Wissenschaften vom Menschen, Vienna (1999), and a senior fellow in law at New York University (2003–2004) and to the Yale School of Law (2004–2007).

== Career ==
=== In Romania ===
Iulia Motoc was a magistrate in Romania, prosecutor, and judge (1989–1995) in criminal law. In 1995 she passed the full registration exam for judges in civil and criminal law. In 1996 she was admitted as a lawyer in the Bucharest Bar. After which she joined the University of Bucharest, as a teaching assistant and later becoming a full professor in 2002. She was a member of the Presidential Commission for Analysis of the Constitution (2007–2008) and rapporteur for the chapter on human rights. Motoc was elected judge at the Constitutional Court of Romania in 2010. She adjudicated on the constitutionality of laws and decided on exceptions brought to the courts of law as to the unconstitutionality of laws and orders in civil and criminal law She held this position until she became a judge at the European Court of Human Rights at the end of 2013.

=== UNCHR career and other international activities ===
Iulia Motoc became a member of the United Nations Subcommission on Human Rights in 1996, first as an alternate and in 2000–2001 she served as a president of the United Nations Subcommission on Human Rights. She has co-authored the Working Paper on Free, Prior and Informed Consent of the Indigenous People which was incorporated in the UN Declaration for Indigenous People. Motoc was on the co-author of the UN Guidelines principles for Extreme poverty. She was the UN Special Rapporteur on Human Rights and the Human Genome, author of the first reports of the United Nations in the field of genetics (2004–2007).

She was UN Special Rapporteur on Human Rights for the Democratic Republic of Congo (2001–2004). In this capacity, she visited the Democratic Republic of Congo during the Second Congo War, reporting on the "mass violations of human rights" that included torture of human rights activists, illegal imprisonment, and extortion.

Iulia Motoc was elected member of the Advisory Committee for the Protection of National Minorities (1998–2004) and (2008–2012). She was a member of the Fundamental Rights Agency of the European Union (2010–2012) and Motoc was also an arbiter with ICSID, Washington (2008–2014).

=== Academic career ===
Iulia Motoc is Professor of International Law and European Law at the University of Bucharest since 2002. She was director (Romania) of the European Master on Human Rights and Democratization, European Inter-University Centre for Human Rights and Democratization, Venise (2007–2015). Iulia Motoc was teaching at New York University School of Law (2002–2003) where she was Senior Jean Monnet Fellow. She has also taught at St-Thomas University in Miami (2001–2003) and she was Special Guest Professor at the European Academy oh Human Rights at the European Institute in Florence (2006). Iulia Motoc is research professor, Institute for Research in International and European Law, Sorbonne (2012–2014). At the European Court of Human Rights, Iulia Motoc has created a group of international law. She also initiated joint conferences between the European Society of International Law and the European Court of Human Rights.

=== European Court of Human Rights ===
Motoc started her term as a judge of the European Court of Human Rights on 18 December 2013. In 2022, her dissenting opinion for the case of N. v. Romania was voted as the best separate opinion of the year 2021 by Strasbourg Observers. According to Strasbourg Observers:

In her Partly Dissenting Opinion, Judge Motoc argued for a finding of violation of Article 14 read in conjunction with Article 8. She analysed the majority's refusal to consider Article 14 in this case, drawing on scholars who have called it the 'Cinderella' provision of the Convention. Judge Motoc then added her own understanding of Article 14 as the 'Hamlet' article of the ECHR, before arguing why it is so important to be willing to consider the discrimination of mentally disabled persons. She emphasised that human rights are often forgotten in the area of mental health and that those who suffer with mental health issues are often subject to discrimination and other forms of marginalization, thus being particularly vulnerable to human rights violations (paras. 7–9). This result suggests that our readership places particular importance on the rights of mentally disabled persons, and agrees with Judge Motoc's argument that the Court should be less circumspect in applying Article 14.

Along with other judges, she was cited in an independent NGO report for possible conflict of interest as she seated in three cases in which the International Commission of Jurists (ICJ) intervened as third party.

=== International Criminal Court ===
Shortly before the International Criminal Court (ICC) decided on a prosecution request for an arrest warrant for Israeli prime minister Benjamin Netanyahu in October 2024, Motoc asked to leave on health grounds the three-judge panel she was presiding, and was immediately replaced by Slovenian judge Beti Hohler.

Judge Motoc is the presiding judge for the Pre-Trial Chamber in the case concerning Rodrigo Duterte.

== Lectures ==
- The Influence of the European Court of Human Rights on Human Rights Regimes in Central and Eastern Europe in the Lecture Series of the United Nations Audiovisual Library of International Law

== Selected publications ==
- Migration and the European Convention on Human Rights (co-editors Ledi Bianku and Basak Cali), Oxford University Press, forthcoming 2020
- The ECHR and General International Law, Oxford University Press, 2018 (co-editor Anne van Aaken)
- New Developments in Constitutional Law, Eleven International Publishing
- The impact of the European Court of Human Rights and the case-law of democratic change and development in Eastern Europe, editors Iulia Motoc and Ineta Ziemele, Cambridge University, 2016;
- Internationalist doctrines during real communism in Europe, UMR Comparative Law, Sorbonne, Society of Comparative Legislation Publishing House, 2012 (co-editor Emmanuelle Jouannet);
- Women's rights as human rights from universal to regional, University of Bucharest, 2009, (ed.);
- The International Law of Genetic Discrimination: The Power of "Never Again" in Thérèse Murphy (ed.), New Technologies and Human Rights, Oxford University Press, Oxford, 2009;
- Pleading for Human Rights, Centre for Human Rights and Humanitarian Law, University Pantheon-Assas II, University of Bucharest Publishing House, 2008 (in French);
- Conception of Pluralism and International Law in E. Jouannet, H.R. Fabri V. Tomcievitz, ESIL procedures, Selected Procedures of European Society of International Law, What's the use for *International Law, Hart, Oxford, 2008;
- State and Individual Responsibility: controversial aspects of the right to democracy, in The State's Responsibility, Academy of International Law, Thesaurus Acroasium, Sakkoulas, Thessaloniki, 2006;
- The role of the UN Special Rapporteurs in relation to States, in Emmanuel Decaux, United Nations and Human Rights, Pedone Publishing House, Paris, 2006;
- About Democracy: Normative Challenges to the International Legal System, in S.Griller (eds.), International Economic Governance and Non-Economic Issues, Springer Wien New York, 2003 (co-author G.H.H. Weiler);
- Public International Law, University of Bucharest, 1996, reprint, 2002 (co-author) (in French);
- Use of Force in Public International Law, Exceptions to Article 2*4 of the UN Charter in the practice of the Security Council, Babel Publishing House, Bucharest, 1997 (in French).

== Honors ==
- National Order "Star of Romania" in the rank of Knight;
- Order of Saints Constantine and Helena;
- Certificate of Honor from the Minister of Foreign Affairs of Japan

== See also ==
- European Court of Human Rights
- University of Bucharest
- Council of Europe

== Personal life ==
Iulia Antoanella Motoc is married to former Minister of Defense Mihnea Motoc, and they have a son.

In her free time, she has written and published a short fiction novel at the end of 2020, "Maria Și Machiavelli".
