= Nicolas Guillou =

French judge of the International Criminal Court (born 1975)

Judge of the International Criminal Court
- Incumbent
- Assumed office 11 March 2024
- Nominated by: France
- Appointed by: Assembly of States Parties

Judge of the Kosovo Specialist Chambers
- In office 7 February 2017 – 6 June 2024

Personal details
- Born: Nicolas Yann Guillou; 13 August 1975 (age 51) Vannes, France
- Alma mater: Paris 1 Panthéon-Sorbonne University; University of Rennes 1 French National School for the Judiciary
- Occupation: Investigating judge

Nicolas Yann Guillou (French pronunciation: [nikɔla ɡiju]; born 13 August 1975) is a French judge who has served as a judge of the International Criminal Court (ICC) since 2024. He previously served as a judge of the Kosovo Specialist Chambers from 2017 to 2024. In this role he issued the arrest warrant for Salih Mustafa. Guillou is an investigating judge by occupation.

== Education and professional career ==
Guillou earned a diplôme d'études approfondies in criminal law and criminal policy in Europe from Paris 1 Panthéon-Sorbonne University and a master's degree in law and criminal science from the University of Rennes 1. He graduated from the French National School for the Judiciary (ENM) in 2003, where he taught and also managed training programmes for judges specialising in international justice.

=== Career ===
- Investigating judge in Meaux (2003–2006)
- Magistrate at the Civil Law Affairs Directorate of the French Ministry of Justice (2006–2009)
- Adviser to the French Ministers of Justice and Foreign Affairs (2009–2012)
- Justice attaché for the United States, French Embassy in Washington, DC (2012–2015)
- Chief of staff to the President of the Special Tribunal for Lebanon (2015–2019)
- International judge at the Kosovo Specialist Chambers (2019–2024)
- Criminal court judge at the International Criminal Court (2024–present)
- Head of the legal team, drafting decisions, and adviser to the President for legal, diplomatic, political, and administrative matters

=== Election to the ICC ===
On 5 December 2023, Guillou was elected a judge of the ICC by the Assembly of States Parties in New York, with 84 votes on the 6th ballot. He took office on 11 March 2024.

== US sanctions ==
On 20 August 2025, the US Treasury's Office of Foreign Assets Control imposed sanctions on Guillou as a member of the pre-trial panel that approved and issued arrest warrants against Israeli Prime Minister Benjamin Netanyahu and former Defence Minister Yoav Gallant. Guillou’s name was listed among 15,000 people, including Al-Qaeda terrorists, drug cartel members, and Russian President Vladimir Putin. The effect of the sanctions means that Guillou is banned from US territory. Under US law, the sanctions also prohibit any American individual or legal entity, as well as any person or company, including their overseas subsidiaries, from providing services to him. This has had the effect of blacklisting him from the world's banking system. As a result of the sanctions, Gillou and his family were barred from using most credit cards, including Mastercard and Visa, and using online travel booking or deliveries that involve an American intermediary.

== Honours ==
- Knight of the Ordre national du Mérite (2024)
