= Erdenebalsuren Damdin =

Mongolian jurist

Judge of the International Criminal Court
- Incumbent
- Assumed office 11 March 2024
- Nominated by: Mongolia
- Appointed by: Assembly of States Parties

Personal details
- Born: 7 August 1967 (age 58)

Erdenebalsuren Damdin (born 7 August 1967) is a Mongolian judge specialising in criminal law, including international humanitarian law and international human rights law. On 11 March 2024 he started a nine-year term as a judge of the International Criminal Court.

== Education ==
Damdin obtained his first degree in law and a Master of Laws at Irkutsk State University.

== Criminal lawyer ==
Starting in the 1990s, Damdin was a defence lawyer, a prosecutor, and a judge in criminal law, representing the accused, victims and witnesses. As a prosecutor, he investigated and prosecuted cases of rape, torture, extrajudicial execution, sexual violence, human trafficking, abductions and terrorism.

Damdin was a justice of the Supreme Court of Mongolia from 2012 or 2013 through to 2024. Among his cases as a justice of the Supreme Court, were cases of reparations for victims of genocide and crimes against humanity in the 1937–1939 Stalinist repressions in Mongolia.

Damdin contributed to legal reform and the integration of the principles of international human rights law and international humanitarian law into the Mongolian legal system. He contributed to the implementation of the Rome Statute, the treaty that establishes the International Criminal Court, into Mongolian law.

== International Criminal Court ==
On 11 March 2024, Damdin began a nine-year term as one of the judges of the International Criminal Court.

== US Sanctions ==
On 18 December, 2025, The US Department of the Treasury's Office of Foreign Assets Control and The Department of State imposed personal sanctions against judge Damdin for engaging "in efforts by the ICC to investigate, arrest, detain, or prosecute Israeli nationals, without Israel’s consent" after he had voted in a majority to dismiss an appeal brought by Israel against arrest warrants for Prime Minister Netanyahu and former Defense Minister Gallant.
