= Beti Hohler =

Slovenian jurist

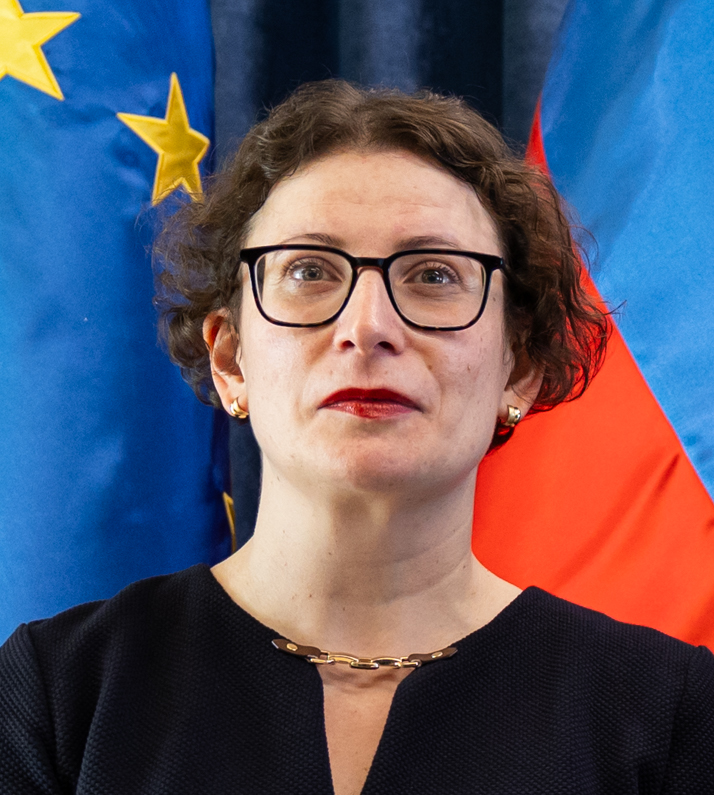

Judge of the International Criminal Court
- Incumbent
- Assumed office 11 March 2024
- Nominated by: Slovenia
- Appointed by: Assembly of States Parties

Personal details
- Born: 25 June 1981 (age 45)
- Education: University of Ljubljana; University of Amsterdam
- Awards: Common Security and Defence Policy Service Medal
- Website: ICC profile

Beti Hohler (born 25 June 1981) is a Slovenian judge serving on the International Criminal Court (ICC) since March 2024.

== Early life and education ==
Hohler was born on 25 June 1981.

== Legal career ==
Hohler started her career as a lawyer in Ljubljana. From 2011 to 2015, she worked as a legal officer to international judges at the European Union Rule of Law Mission in Kosovo. She then worked as a trial lawyer in the ICC's Office of the Prosecutor until becoming a judge.

=== Judge of the International Criminal Court ===
Hohler was elected as a judge of the ICC in December 2023 and began her term in March 2024. She is the first Slovenian to hold this position.

On 25 October 2024, Hohler was appointed to a three-judge panel responsible for reviewing requests for arrest warrants against Israeli Prime Minister Benjamin Netanyahu, Defence Minister Yoav Gallant and Hamas leader Mohammed Deif in relation to allegations of war crimes and crimes against humanity in the Gaza war. She replaced Romanian judge Iulia Motoc, who withdrew from the case citing health reasons. Following her appointment, the Israeli government raised concerns about her previous role as a trial lawyer in the Office of the Prosecutor, questioning her impartiality. On 11 November 2024, Israel formally requested clarification from the ICC regarding potential conflicts of interest.

== U.S. Sanctions ==
In June 2025, judge Hohler was among the four ICC judges sanctioned by the Trump administration. She was targeted as one of the three judges of the pre-trial panel that confirmed arrest warrants against Israeli officials, PM Netanyahu and former Defense Minister Gallant, sought by ICC Prosecutor Karim Khan and his office.
