= Leadership of the United States Southern Command =

U.S. Southern Command leadership

Seal of the United States Southern Command

This is a list of all commanders, deputy commanders, senior enlisted leaders, and chiefs of staff of the United States Southern Command.

== Current combatant command staff ==
- Francis L. Donovan, Commander
  - Clair A. Gill, Military Deputy Commander
    - Jason G. Woodworth, Chief of Staff
      - Jeff E. Elliott, Director, Manpower and Personnel (J1)
      - Dustin A. Shultz, Director, Intelligence (J2)
      - Brendan C. McPherson, Director, Operations (J3)
      - Douglas R. Burke, Director, Logistics (J4)
      - Julian C. Cheater, Director, Plans and Policy (J5)
      - Anne-Marie R. Wiersgalla, Director, Communication Systems (J6)
      - Kevin J. Bostick, Director, Exercises and Coalition (J7/9)
      - Adam Winkleman, Director, Resources and Analysis (J8)
  - Javier A. Reina, Deputy Commander for Mobilization and Reserve Affairs

== List of leaders of the United States Southern Command ==
=== Commanders ===
Commander of the United States Southern Command
- Emblem of the United States Southern Command

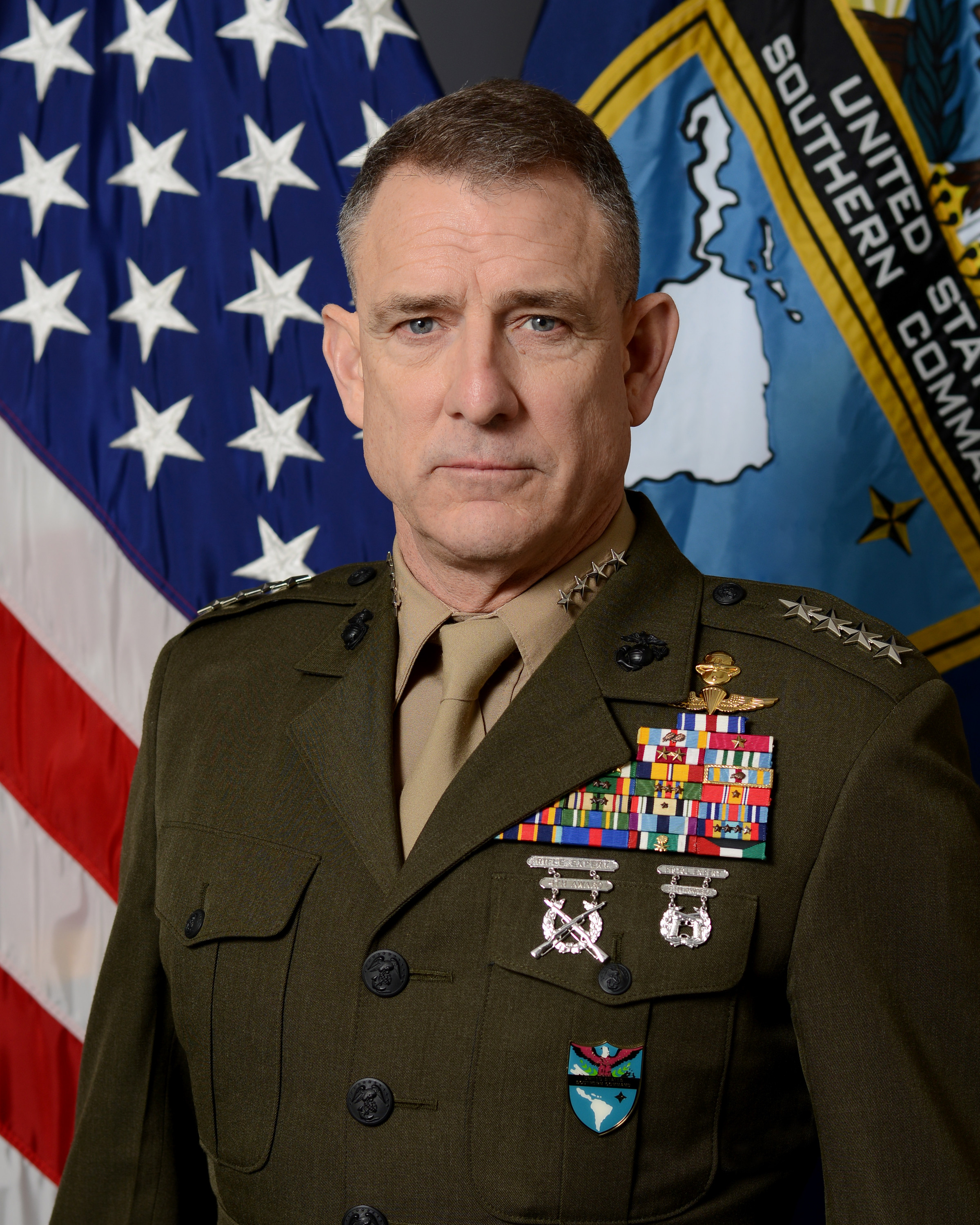
- Incumbent; General Francis L. Donovan, USMC since 5 February 2026
- United States Department of Defense
- Type: Unified combatant commander
- Abbreviation: CDRUSSOUTHOM
- Reports to: President of the United States; Secretary of Defense
- Seat: MacDill Air Force Base, Florida, U.S.
- Nominator: Secretary of Defense
- Appointer: The president; with Senate advice and consent
- Term length: 2–3 years; (approx.)
- Constituting instrument: 10 U.S.C. § 167
- Formation: November 1947
- First holder: Willis D. Crittenberger
- Deputy: Deputy Commander, United States Southern Command

No.	Commander		Term			Service branch
No.	Portrait	Name	Took office	Left office	Term length	Service branch
1	Willis D. Crittenberger	Lieutenant General; Willis D. Crittenberger (1890–1980)	November 1947	June 1948	~ 213 days	U.S. Army
2	Matthew B. Ridgway	Lieutenant General; Matthew B. Ridgway (1895–1993)	June 1948	October 1949	~ 1 year, 122 days	U.S. Army
3	William H. H. Morris Jr.	Lieutenant General; William H. H. Morris Jr. (1890–1971)	October 1949	April 1952	~ 2 years, 183 days	U.S. Army
4	Horace L. McBride	Lieutenant General; Horace L. McBride (1894–1962)	April 1952	June 1954	~ 2 years, 61 days	U.S. Army
5	William K. Harrison Jr.	Lieutenant General; William K. Harrison Jr. (1895–1987)	June 1954	January 1957	~ 2 years, 214 days	U.S. Army
6	Robert M. Montague	Lieutenant General; Robert M. Montague (1899–1958)	January 1957	February 1958	~ 1 year, 31 days	U.S. Army
7	Ridgely Gaither	Lieutenant General; Ridgely Gaither (1903–1992)	April 1958	July 1960	~ 2 years, 91 days	U.S. Army
8	Robert F. Sink	Lieutenant General; Robert F. Sink (1905–1965)	July 1960	January 1961	~ 184 days	U.S. Army
9	Andrew P. O'Meara	General; Andrew P. O'Meara (1907–2005)	6 January 1961	22 February 1965	4 years, 47 days	U.S. Army
10	Robert W. Porter Jr.	General; Robert W. Porter Jr. (1908–2000)	22 February 1965	18 February 1969	3 years, 362 days	U.S. Army
11	George R. Mather	General; George R. Mather (1911–1993)	18 February 1969	20 September 1971	2 years, 214 days	U.S. Army
12	George V. Underwood Jr.	General; George V. Underwood Jr. (1913–1984)	20 September 1971	17 January 1973	1 year, 119 days	U.S. Army
13	William B. Rosson	General; William B. Rosson (1918–2004)	17 January 1973	1 August 1975	2 years, 196 days	U.S. Army
14	Dennis P. McAuliffe	Lieutenant General; Dennis P. McAuliffe (1922–2012)	1 August 1975	1 October 1979	4 years, 61 days	U.S. Army
15	Wallace H. Nutting	Lieutenant General; Wallace H. Nutting (1928–2023)	1 October 1979	24 May 1983	3 years, 235 days	U.S. Army
16	Paul F. Gorman	General; Paul F. Gorman (1927–2026)	24 May 1983	1 March 1985	1 year, 281 days	U.S. Army
17	John R. Galvin	General; John R. Galvin (1929–2015)	1 March 1985	6 June 1987	2 years, 97 days	U.S. Army
18	Frederick F. Woerner Jr.	General; Frederick F. Woerner Jr. (1933–2023)	6 June 1987	1 October 1989	2 years, 117 days	U.S. Army
19	Maxwell R. Thurman	General; Maxwell R. Thurman (1931–1995)	1 October 1989	21 November 1990	1 year, 51 days	U.S. Army
20	George A. Joulwan	General; George A. Joulwan (born 1939)	21 November 1990	October 1993	~ 2 years, 314 days	U.S. Army
-	Walter T. Worthington	Major General; Walter T. Worthington; Acting	October 1993	17 February 1994	~ 139 days	U.S. Air Force
21	Barry McCaffrey	General; Barry McCaffrey (born 1942)	17 February 1994	1 March 1996	2 years, 13 days	U.S. Army
-	James Perkins	Rear Admiral; James Perkins; Acting	1 March 1996	26 June 1996	117 days	U.S. Navy
22	Wesley Clark	General; Wesley Clark (born 1944)	26 June 1996	13 July 1997	1 year, 17 days	U.S. Army
-	Walter F. Doran	Rear Admiral; Walter F. Doran (born 1945); Acting	13 July 1997	25 September 1997	74 days	U.S. Navy
23	Charles E. Wilhelm	General; Charles E. Wilhelm (born 1941)	25 September 1997	8 September 2000	2 years, 349 days	U.S. Marine Corps
24	Peter Pace	General; Peter Pace (born 1945)	8 September 2000	30 September 2001	1 year, 22 days	U.S. Marine Corps
-	Gary D. Speer	Major General; Gary D. Speer; Acting	30 September 2001	18 August 2002	322 days	U.S. Army
25	James T. Hill	General; James T. Hill (born 1946)	18 August 2002	9 November 2004	2 years, 83 days	U.S. Army
26	Bantz J. Craddock	General; Bantz J. Craddock (born 1949)	9 November 2004	19 October 2006	1 year, 344 days	U.S. Army
27	James G. Stavridis	Admiral; James G. Stavridis (born 1955)	19 October 2006	25 June 2009	2 years, 249 days	U.S. Navy
28	Douglas M. Fraser	General; Douglas M. Fraser (born 1953)	25 June 2009	19 November 2012	3 years, 147 days	U.S. Air Force
29	John F. Kelly	General; John F. Kelly (born 1950)	19 November 2012	14 January 2016	3 years, 56 days	U.S. Marine Corps
30	Kurt W. Tidd	Admiral; Kurt W. Tidd (born 1956)	14 January 2016	26 November 2018	2 years, 316 days	U.S. Navy
31	Craig S. Faller	Admiral; Craig S. Faller (born 1961)	26 November 2018	29 October 2021	2 years, 337 days	U.S. Navy
32	Laura J. Richardson	General; Laura J. Richardson (born 1963)	29 October 2021	7 November 2024	3 years, 9 days	U.S. Army
33	Alvin Holsey	Admiral; Alvin Holsey (born 1965)	7 November 2024	12 December 2025	1 year, 35 days	U.S. Navy
-	Evan L. Pettus	Lieutenant General; Evan L. Pettus (born c. 1972); Acting	12 December 2025	5 February 2026	55 days	U.S. Air Force
35	Francis L. Donovan	General; Francis L. Donovan (born c. 1966)	5 February 2026	Incumbent	273 days	U.S. Marine Corps

=== Deputy commanders ===
No.	Deputy Commander		Term			Service branch
No.	Portrait	Name	Took office	Left office	Term length	Service branch
-	Jerome F. Smith Jr.	Rear Admiral; Jerome F. Smith Jr.	August 1990	~July 1994	~3 years, 334 days	U.S. Navy
-	Walter T. Worthington	Rear Admiral; Walter T. Worthington	July 1992	~July 1994	~2 years	U.S. Air Force
-	James B. Perkins III	Rear Admiral; James B. Perkins III	July 1994	~December 1996	~2 years, 153 days	U.S. Navy
-	Walter Doran	Rear Admiral; Walter Doran (born 1945)	December 1996	July 1998	~1 year, 212 days	U.S. Navy
-	Gary D. Speer	Major General; Gary D. Speer	July 2000	October 2002	~2 years, 92 days	U.S. Army
-	Glenn Spears	Lieutenant General; Glenn Spears (born 1956)	June 2006	July 2009	~3 years, 30 days	U.S. Air Force
-	Ken Keen	Lieutenant General; Ken Keen (born 1952)	2009	May 2011	~1 year, 319 days	U.S. Army
-	Joseph D. Kernan	Vice Admiral; Joseph D. Kernan (born 1955)	May 2011	September 2013	~2 years, 123 days	U.S. Navy
-	Kenneth E. Tovo	Lieutenant General; Kenneth E. Tovo (born 1961)	September 2013	June 2015	~1 year, 273 days	U.S. Army
-	Joseph P. DiSalvo	Lieutenant General; Joseph P. DiSalvo (born 1965)	June 2015	August 2018	~3 years, 61 days	U.S. Army
-	Michael T. Plehn	Lieutenant General; Michael T. Plehn (born 1965)	22 October 2018	20 December 2020	2 years, 59 days	U.S. Air Force
-	Andrew A. Croft	Lieutenant General; Andrew A. Croft (born 1965)	20 December 2020	1 February 2023	2 years, 43 days	U.S. Air Force
-	Alvin Holsey	Vice Admiral; Alvin Holsey (born 1965)	1 February 2023	7 November 2024	1 year, 280 days	U.S. Navy
-	Evan L. Pettus	Lieutenant General; Evan L. Pettus (born c. 1972)	7 November 2024	23 October 2026	1 year, 350 days	U.S. Air Force
-	Clair A. Gill	Lieutenant General; Clair A. Gill (born c. 1972)	23 October 2026	Incumbent	13 days	U.S. Army

=== Senior enlisted leaders ===
No.	Senior enlisted leader		Term			Service branch
No.	Portrait	Name	Took office	Left office	Term length	Service branch
-	Michael M. Balch	Command Sergeant Major; Michael M. Balch	6 December 2004	~August 2009	~4 years, 252 days	U.S. Army
-	Louis M. Espinal	Sergeant Major; Louis M. Espinal	9 October 2009	~April 2012	~2 years, 189 days	U.S. Marine Corps
-	Eric J. Geressy	Command Sergeant Major; Eric J. Geressy	April 2012	August 2014	~1 year, 212 days	U.S. Army
-	William B. Zaiser	Command Sergeant Major; William B. Zaiser	~August 2014	6 January 2017	~2 years, 144 days	U.S. Army
-	Bryan K. Zickefoose	Sergeant Major; Bryan K. Zickefoose	6 January 2017	17 August 2020	3 years, 224 days	U.S. Marine Corps
-	Benjamin Jones	Command Sergeant Major; Benjamin Jones	17 August 2020	6 September 2023	3 years, 20 days	U.S. Army
-	Rafael Rodriguez	Sergeant Major; Rafael Rodriguez	6 September 2023	Incumbent	3 years, 24 days	U.S. Marine Corps
-	Raymond S. Harris	Command Sergeant Major; Raymond S. Harris	30 September 2026	Incumbent	36 days	U.S. Army

=== Chiefs of staff ===
No.	Chief of Staff		Term			Service branch
No.	Portrait	Name	Took office	Left office	Term length	Service branch
-	Juan G. Ayala	Major General; Juan G. Ayala (born 1956)	June 2010	May 2012	~1 year, 335 days	U.S. Marine Corps
-	Joseph P. DiSalvo	Major General; Joseph P. DiSalvo	May 2012	June 2013	~1 year, 31 days	U.S. Army
-	Mark C. Nowland	Major General; Mark C. Nowland (born 1958)	June 2013	December 2014	~1 year, 183 days	U.S. Air Force
-	Michael T. Plehn	Major General; Michael T. Plehn (born 1965)	January 2015	June 2017	~2 years, 151 days	U.S. Air Force
-	Jon A. Norman	Major General; Jon A. Norman	June 2017	July 2018	~1 year, 30 days	U.S. Air Force
-	Patricia M. Anslow	Major General; Patricia M. Anslow	July 2018	June 2020	~1 year, 336 days	U.S. Army
-	Yvette M. Davids	Rear Admiral; Yvette M. Davids (born 1967)	June 2020	July 2022	~2 years, 30 days	U.S. Navy
-	Scott A. Jackson	Major General; Scott A. Jackson (born 1970)	July 2022	July 2024	~1 year, 352 days	U.S. Army
-	Julie L. Nethercot	Major General; Julie L. Nethercot	July 2024	August 2026	~2 years, 45 days	U.S. Marine Corps
-	Jason G. Woodworth	Major General; Jason G. Woodworth	August 2026	Incumbent	~82 days	U.S. Marine Corps

== See also ==
- United States Southern Command
- Leadership of the United States Africa Command
- Leadership of the United States European Command
- Leadership of the United States Indo-Pacific Command
- Leadership of the United States Northern Command
- Leadership of the United States Space Command
- Leadership of the United States Cyber Command
- Leadership of the United States Strategic Command
- Leadership of the United States Transportation Command
