= Charles Wilhelm =

Charles Wilhelm may refer to:

- William Charles John Pitcher (1858–1925), English artist, and costume and scenery designer, known professionally as C. Wilhelm
- Charles E. Wilhelm (born 1941), retired United States Marine Corps general
