= Dennis P. McAuliffe =

United States Army brigadier general

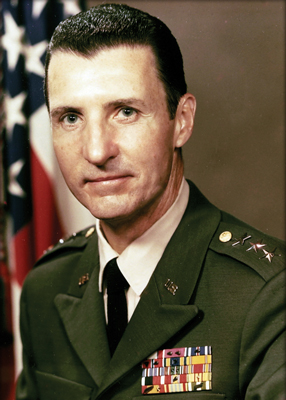
- Born: April 8, 1922; New York City, New York, U.S.
- Died: July 31, 2012 (aged 90); Fort Belvoir, Fairfax County, U.S.
- Military career
- Allegiance: United States
- Branch: United States Army
- Service years: 1944–1979
- Rank: Lieutenant general
- Commands: U.S. Southern Command; U.S. Army Combined Arms Center; 1st Infantry Division; I Corps Artillery
- Conflicts: World War II; Vietnam War
- Awards: Defense Distinguished Service Medal; Army Distinguished Service Medal; Legion of Merit (3); Distinguished Flying Cross (2); Bronze Star Medal (2) (with "V" device); Air Medal (6)

Dennis Philip McAuliffe (April 8, 1922 – July 31, 2012) was a United States Army lieutenant general who served as the commander-in-chief of the U.S. Southern Command, from 1975 to 1979. He also served as the first Administrator of the Panama Canal Commission from 1979 to 1989.

== Career ==
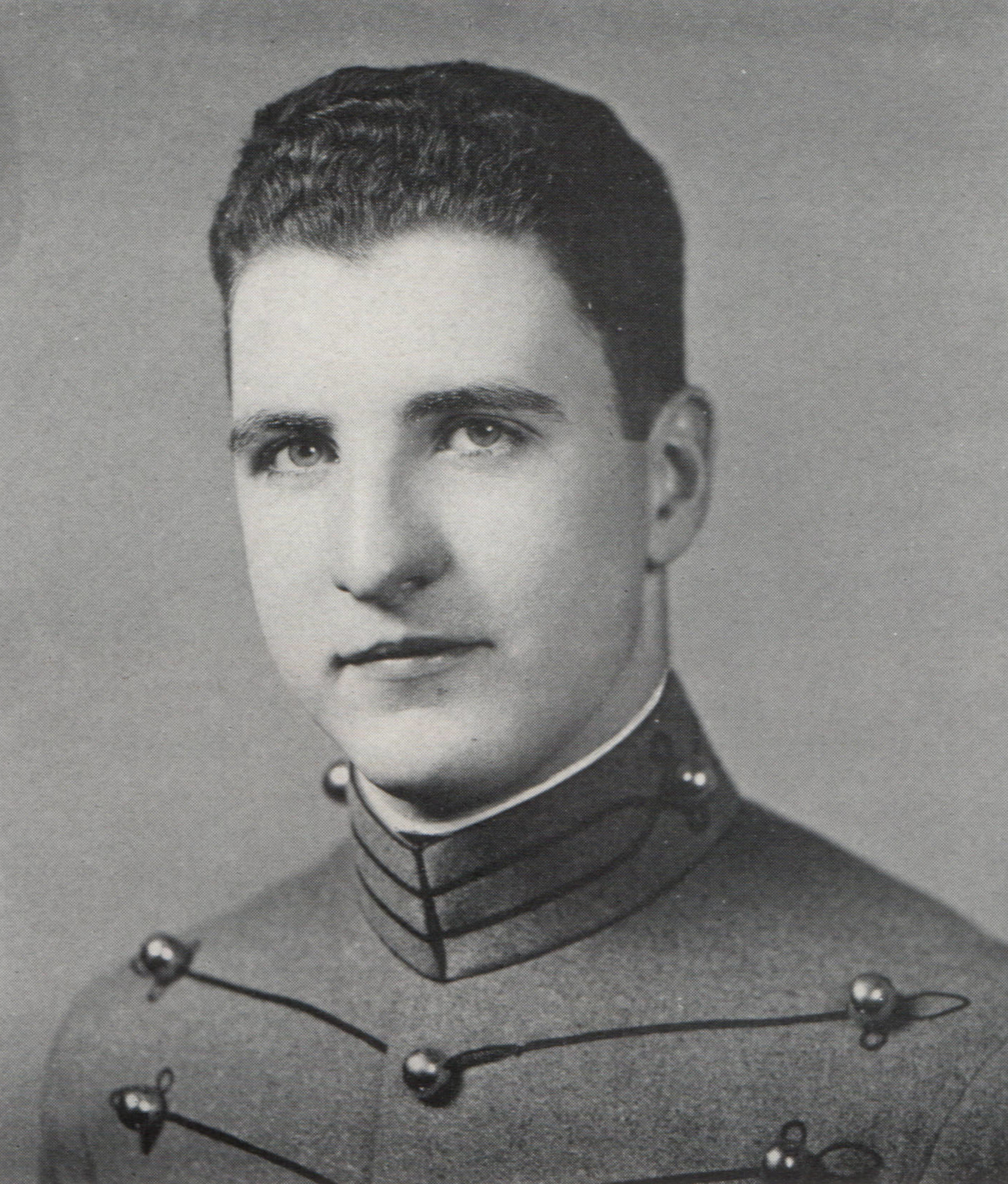
McAuliffe as a United States Military Academy cadet c. 1944

After finishing school, he began officer training at the U.S. Military Academy (USMA) at West Point, New York. At the same time, he studied military science there, graduating with a Bachelor of Science (B.S.) in 1944.

=== World War II ===
He then held numerous officer appointments, his first being as a field artillery officer in the 89th Infantry Division, the so-called "Rolling W". In April 1945, as a young lieutenant in a unit, he was stationed at the Ohrdruf forced labor camp, part of the larger Buchenwald concentration camp. Ohrdruf was the first Nazi concentration camp to fall into US hands. In archival films of the liberation, McAuliffe can be seen ordering SS members and local citizens to enter a death chamber and view the victims of the Holocaust. When three high-ranking army generals—Dwight D. Eisenhower, Omar N. Bradley, and George S. Patton—visited the camp, he was close enough to see their expressions.

=== Post-World War II ===
He later studied electrical engineering at the University of Pennsylvania, graduating with a Master of Science in Electrical Engineering in 1950. From 1964 to 1965 he served as an artillery officer in the headquarters of the I Corps in Korea, for which he was first awarded the Legion of Merit. Upon his return he moved to the office of the Chairman of the Joint Chiefs of Staff, General Earle Wheeler, where he initially served as the Army representative to the staff group from 1966 to 1967, and then as the Executive Officer to the Chairman of the Joint Chiefs of Staff from 1967 to 1969. He was again awarded the second Legion of Merit for his military service.

=== Vietnam War ===
During the Vietnam War, McAuliffe was initially deputy commander of the 1st Infantry Division ("the Big Red One"), from 1969 to 1970. Then, between 1970 and 1971, he was deputy chief advisor to the III Corps stationed in South Vietnam and III Corps Tactical Zone there. At the same time, he served as commanding general of the Military Assistance Advisory Group (MAAG) in III Corps Tactical Zone. He was awarded the Army Distinguished Service Medal for his services as Deputy Senior Advisor to Commanding General, III Corps Tactical Zone.

=== Post-Vietnam ===
He then moved to the Supreme Headquarters Allied Powers Europe (SHAPE) in 1971, where he served as head of the Policy Division of the Plans and Policy Division until 1973. For his services he was again awarded the third Legion of Merit.

Upon his return to the United States, he initially served as Deputy Commanding General, Combined Arms Combat Developments Activity (CAED) at the newly established U.S. Army Combined Arms Center (USACAC) at Fort Leavenworth from 1973 to 1974. He then served at the U.S. Department of Defense, where he served as Director of the European Region in the Office of the Assistant Secretary of Defense for International Security Affairs, Robert Fred Ellsworth, from 1974 to 1975.

In August 1975, then-Lieutenant general McAuliffe succeeded General William B. Rosson as Commander-in-Chief, US Southern Command (SOUTHCOM), stationed at Quarry Heights in the Panama Canal Zone. He held this command until September 1979, when he was succeeded by Lieutenant general Wallace H. Nutting. He also served as a member of the Canal Zone Civilian Personnel Coordinating Board and the Panama Review Committee from August 1975 to September 1979. He was awarded the Defense Distinguished Service Medal for his service.

== Post-military service ==
On July 31, 1979, he was appointed as the first Administrator of the Panama Canal Commission. This position was created by the Torrijos-Carter Treaties concerning the Panama Canal and established by legislation then pending in the U.S. Congress implementing the treaties. This placed the Panama Canal Zone under joint U.S.-Panamanian control. He served as Administrator for ten years until 1989, when he was succeeded by Gilberto Guardia Fabrega.

== Awards and decorations ==
His awards and decorations include:

Defense Distinguished Service Medal
Army Distinguished Service Medal
Legion of Merit with two bronze oak leaf clusters
Distinguished Flying Cross with one bronze oak leaf cluster
Bronze Star Medal with one leaf clusters
Air Medal with bronze award numeral 6
American Defense Service Medal with one campaign star
American Campaign Medal
European-African-Middle Eastern Campaign Medal with two service stars
World War II Victory Medal
Army of Occupation Medal
National Defense Service Medal with service star
Vietnam Service Medal with one silver campaign star
Vietnam Gallantry Cross with palm and gold star
Vietnam Armed Forces Honor Medal
Vietnam Campaign Medal

== Publications ==
- "Panama Canal Commission Nomination of Lt. Gen. Dennis P. McAuliffe, USA, To Be Administrator". The American Presidency Project. 1979-07-31.
- "Dennis Philip McAuliffe". The Hall of Valor Project.
- "D. P. McAuliffe, Army general who helped liberate Nazi camp and administered Panama Canal, dies at 90". The Washington Post. 2012-08-06.
