= Glenn Spears =

U.S. Air Force general

Glenn F. Spears
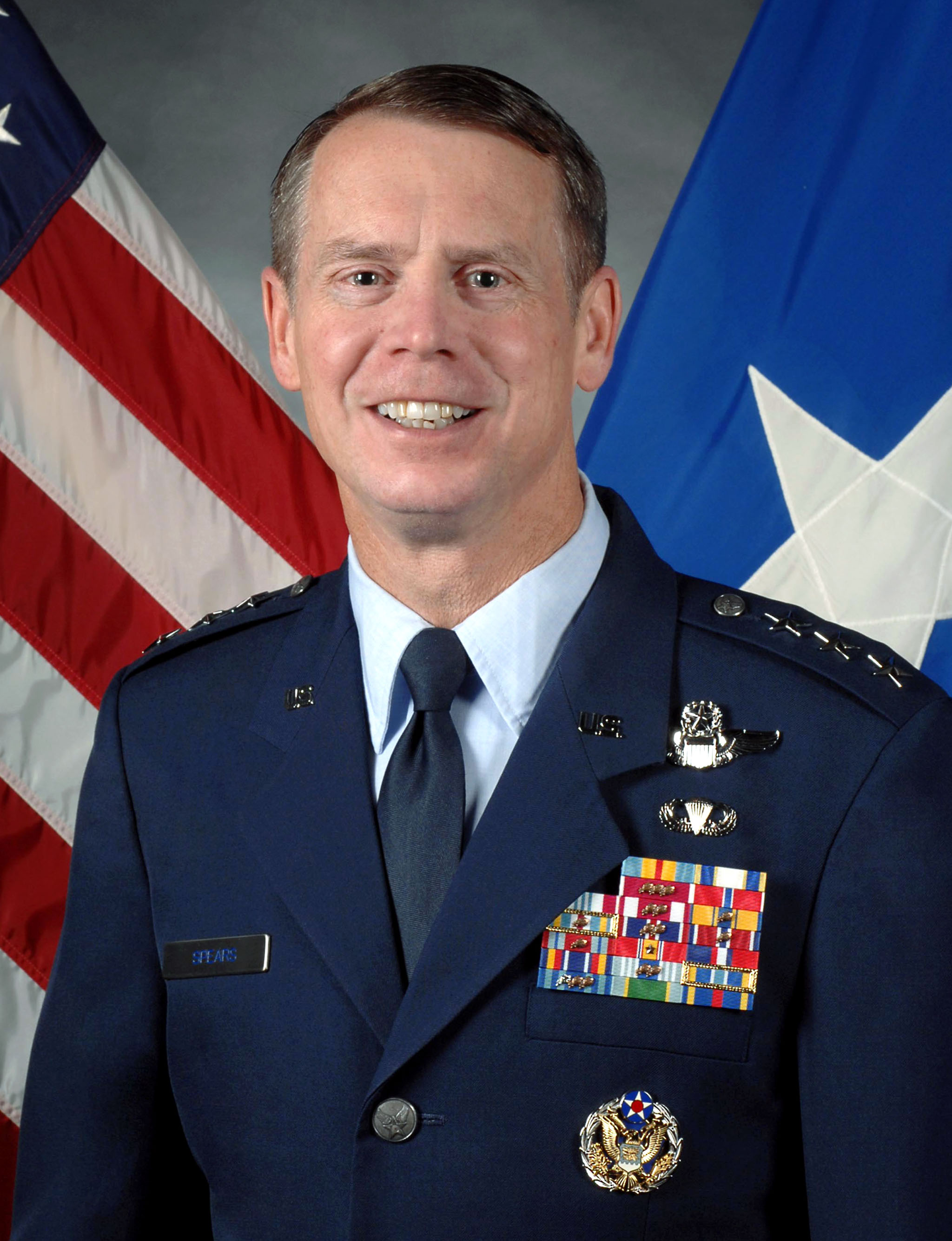
- Official portrait, 2009
- Born: Louisville, Kentucky
- Education: Air Force Academy
- Spouse: Kim
- Military career
- Allegiance: United States
- Branch: United States Air Force
- Service years: 1978-2011
- Rank: Lieutenant General
- Conflicts: Operation Allied Force

Glenn F. Spears is a retired United States Air Force lieutenant general now working as a business development consultant. He was formerly Commander, Air Forces Southern and 12th Air Force. He was also deputy commander of United States Southern Command, one of nine (now there are eleven) combatant commands in the United States Department of Defense. He also commanded the Special Air Mission, the unit responsible for flying the President of the United States on Air Force One. During his 33 years of service in the Air Force, he commanded at every level, provided force management expertise and flew over 3,400 hours in 16 types of Air Force aircraft.

== Education ==
Spears graduated from Glenbard West High School in 1974 and received a bachelor's degree from the United States Air Force Academy in 1978, a master's degree from Salve Regina University in 1987 and the Air War College.

== Career ==
Spears flew the Boeing KC-135 Stratotanker, Boeing B-52 Stratofortress, Rockwell B-1 Lancer and Lockheed MC-130H aircraft and became an experienced strategic instructor pilot and command pilot. As a major, he worked for two years as a strategic force programmer. As a colonel, he was commander of the 28th Operations Group, where he developed new tactics for bomber strikes. During Operation Allied Force in the Kosovo War, he commanded the 100th Air Expeditionary Wing. He was also the executive officer to the Chief of Staff of the Air Force stationed at The Pentagon.

As a brigadier general, he was commander of the 89th Airlift Wing stationed at Andrews Air Force Base, Maryland. In this position, he commanded 6,200 civilians and officers, and was responsible for ensuring the President and other national leaders were safe while flying globally, a job he held in the aftermath of the September 11 attacks in 2001. Within days of Spears taking command of the 89th, Air Force One played a pivotal role for President Bush as commander-in-chief during the 9/11 crisis. At the same time, he was also commander of Andrews Air Force Base.

Following his command of the 89th, he became the Director of Plans and Programs for the Pacific Air Forces and was stationed at Hickham Air Force Base, Hawaii. In this position, he was responsible for Air Force planning, programing and budgeting for the United States Pacific Command, the largest combatant command of the United States Department of Defense, which encompasses more than 100 million square miles (260,000,000 km2). Also as a brigadier general, he was the Director of Force Management Policy, Deputy Chief of Staff for Manpower and Personnel at the United States Air Force Headquarters, responsible for ensuring the correct force to meet mission requirements. During this assignment, he provided leadership during the Air Force study by the RAND Corporation on the enlisted force. He continued in this role as a major general, where he chaired senior level working group meetings to review results of an Air Force study by the RAND Corporation for force development.

As a lieutenant general, he was the deputy commander of the United States Southern Command stationed in Doral, Florida. During this time, the Southern Command was involved in Joint Task Force Bravo and Operation New Horizons. In August 2009, he took command of Twelfth Air Force and Air Forces Southern stationed at Davis–Monthan Air Force Base, which was responsible for, "seven wings, two direct reporting units and 14 Air Force National Guard and Reserve units" and "all aircraft operating in the Central and Southern America and the Caribbean". Additionally, Twelfth Air Force was the lead planning agency for designated operations in the Southern Command region. While he was commander, the 12th Air Force responded to 2010 Haiti earthquake. During this crisis, he took actions to increase airlift resources and facilitate delivery of much needed humanitarian assistance.

He retired from the Air Force on June 1, 2011, after 33 years of service. Upon retirement, he became a consultant at The Spectrum Group.
