= Francis Donovan (general) =

American Marine Corps general

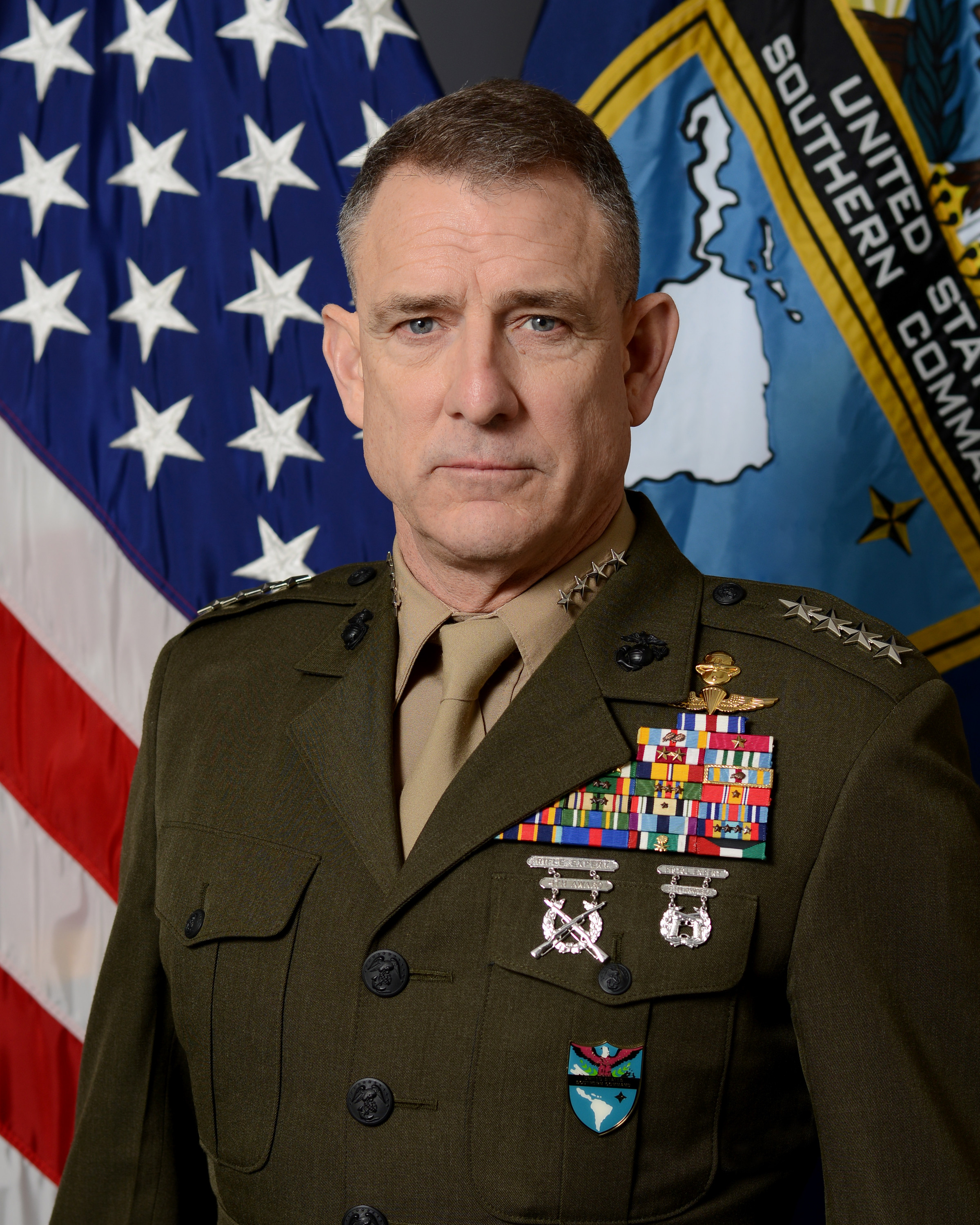
- Official portrait, 2026
- Education: Towson University (BA); Marine Corps University (MA); United States Army War College (MS)
- Military career
- Allegiance: United States
- Branch: United States Marine Corps
- Service years: 1986–present
- Rank: General
- Commands: United States Southern Command; 2nd Marine Division; 5th Marine Expeditionary Brigade; 24th Marine Expeditionary Unit; 2nd Battalion, 1st Marines
- Conflicts: Gulf War; Iraq War; Operation Southern Spear
- Awards: Silver Star; Defense Superior Service Medal (3); Legion of Merit (2)

Francis L. Donovan is an American general who has served as the commander of the United States Southern Command since 2026. He previously served as vice commander of the United States Special Operations Command from 2022 to 2026 and as the commanding general of the 2nd Marine Division from 2020 to 2022.

Donovan entered the United States Marine Corps in 1986 and served as an infantry, reconnaissance, and special operations officer. His deployments have included the Gulf War and the Iraq War. He was the executive officer of the Marine Corps Special Operations Detachment One from 2005 to 2006. Donovan's notable commands have included the 2nd Battalion, 1st Marines; the 24th Marine Expeditionary Unit from 2011 to 2013; and the 5th Marine Expeditionary Brigade from 2016 to 2018. He was also an assistant commanding general of the Joint Special Operations Command from 2018 to 2020.

As the commander of Southern Command, he has overseen airstrikes on alleged drug boats during Operation Southern Spear.

== Early life and education ==
Donovan grew up in a military family; his father was a United States Navy vice admiral. Donovan earned a Bachelor of Arts degree in geography from Towson University. He later received a Master of Military Studies degree from the Marine Corps Command and Staff College at Marine Corps University and a Master of Strategic Studies degree the United States Army War College. He also completed the Advanced Management Program at Harvard Business School.

== Marine career ==
Donovan entered the United States Marine Corps in 1986, becoming an infantry and reconnaissance officer. His commands included a Force Reconnaissance platoon, a Marine Corps Security Forces Detachment in Crete, Greece, a Fleet Antiterrorism Security Team (FAST) platoon, and a recruiting station in eastern Pennsylvania. He also served as the commander of the 2nd Battalion, 1st Marines.

As a lieutenant colonel, Donovan served as executive officer of Marine Corps Special Operations Command Detachment One (Det One) from 16 April 2005 to 10 March 2006. As a colonel, Donovan took command of the 24th Marine Expeditionary Unit on 6 May 2011 and led it during a nine-month deployment that included training exercises in Africa and the Middle East. The unit was also on stand-by to provide security at American embassies in the region during the Arab Spring. He relinquished command on 21 March 2013. His next assignment was as the Director of the Expeditionary Warfare School in Quantico, Virginia. Donovan also served as the J35 at the United States Special Operations Command and the Joint Staff; and the J5 Plans Directorate as Division Chief, Transregional Threats Coordination Cell.

As a brigadier general, Donovan spent two years as the Commanding General of Naval Amphibious Forces, Task Force 51 / 5th Marine Expeditionary Brigade (known as Task Force 51/5). He assumed command of Task Force 51/5, the forward element of the Marine Corps Forces Central Command, on 24 June 2016 in Manama, Bahrain, succeeding Maj. Gen. Carl Mundy III. Donovan relinquished command to Brig. Gen. Matthew Trollinger on 3 July 2018. His next assignment was as assistant commanding general, Joint Special Operations Command (JSOC), at Fort Bragg, North Carolina.

He served as the commanding general of the 2nd Marine Division from 2020 to 2022, at Camp Lejeune, North Carolina. After division command, he served as the director of Marine Corps Communication. In September 2022, Donovan was nominated for promotion to lieutenant general with assignment as vice commander, U.S. Special Operations Command. He was confirmed 15 December 2022.

=== SOUTHCOM commander ===
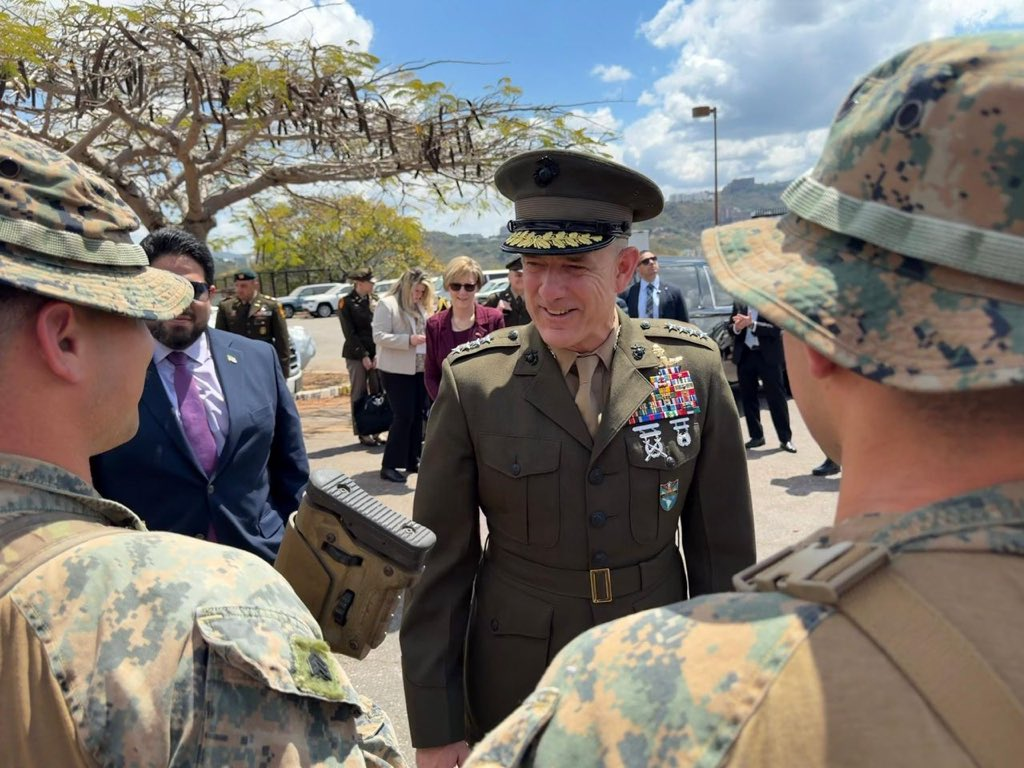
Donovan with Marine Security Guards at the U.S. Embassy in Caracas, Venezuela, 18 February 2026.

In December 2025, President Donald Trump nominated him for promotion to four-star general and appointment as commander, United States Southern Command. On 3 January 2026, the Senate returned his nomination to the president without action. His nomination was re-sent to the Senate on 8 January 2026, and confirmed on 30 January 2026. He assumed command on 5 February 2026, succeeding acting commander Lt. Gen. Evan Pettus.

On 18 February 2026, Donovan and U.S. chargé d'affaires to Venezuela Laura F. Dogu met with officials of the Venezuelan interim government—weeks after the U.S. intervention in Venezuela—to discuss the security situation and President Donald Trump's plan for the stabilization of the country. From 1–2 March, he visited Ecuador to discuss security cooperation with President Daniel Noboa and senior defense officials. On 17 March, he presented his Southern Command posture statement to Congress, which notably differed from those of previous commanders by shifting the focus from Chinese influence in the region to drug cartels, and from supporting overall development to the use of direct military force. During the 2026 Cuban crisis, he told the Senate on 19 March 2026 that the U.S. military is not rehearsing or actively preparing to invade Cuba. Donovan visited Panama from 30 March–1 April, where he met President José Raúl Mulino and other officials to discuss cooperation.

At Donovan's direction, Southern Command increased military activity to counter drug trafficking in the Caribbean and the Eastern Pacific, which included operating additional fixed-wing aircraft and MQ-9 Reaper drones from El Salvador and Puerto Rico. As part of Operation Southern Spear, Southern Command conducted airstrikes on alleged drug boats in the Caribbean and the Pacific at the direction of Donovan during April 2026.

== Awards and decorations ==
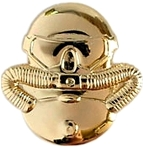

SCUBA Diver Badge
Navy and Marine Corps Parachutist Insignia
Silver Star Medal
Defense Superior Service Medal with two oak leaf clusters	Legion of Merit with one gold award star	Meritorious Service Medal with two gold award stars	Joint Service Commendation Medal
Navy and Marine Corps Commendation Medal with three gold award stars	Combat Action Ribbon	Navy Unit Commendation with two bronze service stars	Navy Meritorious Unit Commendation
National Defense Service Medal with one bronze service star	Armed Forces Expeditionary Medal	Southwest Asia Service Medal with two bronze service stars	Iraq Campaign Medal with service star
Global War on Terrorism Service Medal	Korea Defense Service Medal	Humanitarian Service Medal	Sea Service Deployment Ribbon with three service stars
Navy and Marine Corps Overseas Service Ribbon	Marine Corps Recruiting Ribbon	Kuwait Liberation Medal (Saudi Arabia)	Kuwait Liberation Medal (Kuwait)
Expert Rifle Badge		Expert Pistol Badge	
United States Southern Command Badge

== Dates of promotion ==
Rank	Branch	Date
Major	Marine Corps	22 May 1998
Lieutenant colonel	Marine Corps	31 March 2003
Colonel	Marine Corps	3 April 2009
Brigadier general	Marine Corps	26 May 2016
Major general	Marine Corps	20 March 2020
Lieutenant general	Marine Corps	15 December 2022
General	Marine Corps	30 January 2026

== Personal life ==
Donovan is married to Kim, a retired Navy officer, and they have two children, who are both active-duty Marines.

Military offices
Preceded by Carl E. Mundy III	Commanding General of the 5th Marine Expeditionary Brigade; 2016–2018	Succeeded by Matthew G. Trollinger
Preceded by David J. Furness	Commanding General of the 2nd Marine Division; 2020–2022	Succeeded by Calvert L. Worth Jr.
Preceded by Tony D. Bauernfeind	Vice Commander of the United States Special Operations Command; 2022–2025	Succeeded by Steven M. Marks
Preceded by Evan Pettus; Acting	Commander of the United States Southern Command; 2026–present	Incumbent
