= Evan Pettus =

U.S. Air Force general officer

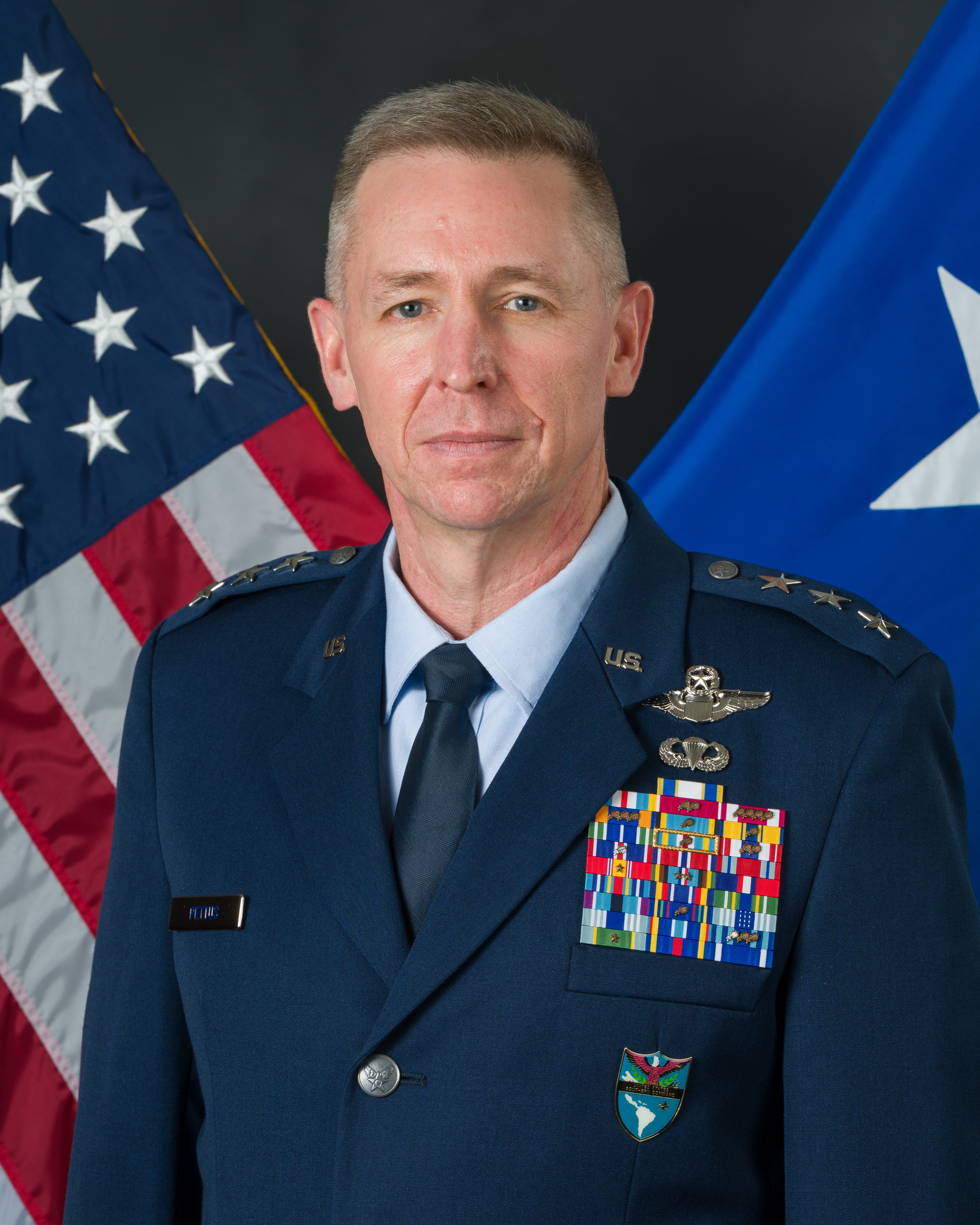
- Official portrait, 2026
- Born: c. 1972 (age 53–54); Fayetteville, Arkansas, U.S.
- Education: United States Air Force Academy (BS); Air Force Institute of Technology (MS); Air War College (MSS)
- Military career
- Allegiance: United States
- Branch: United States Air Force
- Service years: 1994–present
- Rank: Lieutenant General
- Commands: Twelfth Air Force; 378th Air Expeditionary Wing; Air Command and Staff College; 48th Fighter Wing; 48th Fighter Wing; 389th Fighter Squadron
- Conflicts: Iraqi no-fly zones conflict; Operation Southern Watch; Operation Northern Watch; Kosovo War; Operation Allied Force; War in Afghanistan; Iraq War; War against the Islamic State; Operation Inherent Resolve
- Awards: Defense Superior Service Medal; Legion of Merit (3)

Evan Lamar Pettus (born c. 1972) is a United States Air Force lieutenant general who has served as the military deputy commander of the United States Southern Command since 2024. He was the acting commander of the Southern Command from 2025 to 2026. He previously served as the commander of the Twelfth Air Force and as the vice commander of the United States Air Force Warfare Center.

== Biography ==
Pettus earned his commission from the U.S. Air Force Academy in 1994 and graduated from Euro-NATO Joint Jet Pilot Training at Sheppard AFB and from the U.S. Air Force Weapons School.

He was first stationed at RAF Lakenheath in the United Kingdom as an F-15E pilot. His service record includes combat missions in operations Northern Watch, Southern Watch, Allied Force, Enduring Freedom, Iraqi Freedom and Inherent Resolve.

In July 2024, Pettus was nominated for promotion to lieutenant general and assignment as deputy commander of the United States Southern Command.

On 12 December 2025, Pettus became the acting commander of U.S. Southern Command when Admiral Alvin Holsey relinquished command early. He was the acting commander until 5 February 2026, when General Francis Donovan was confirmed.

== Dates of promotion ==
Rank	Branch	Date
Second lieutenant	Air Force	1 June 1994
First lieutenant	Air Force	1 June 1996
Captain	Air Force	1 June 1998
Major	Air Force	1 July 2004
Lieutenant colonel	Air Force	1 June 2008
Colonel	Air Force	1 October 2013
Brigadier general	Air Force	31 July 2019
Major general	Air Force	3 July 2022
Lieutenant general	Air Force	4 November 2024

Military offices
Preceded by Robert G. Novotny	Commander of the 48th Fighter Wing; 2016–2018	Succeeded by William L. Marshall
Preceded by James D. Dryjanski	Commandant of the Air Command and Staff College; 2018–2020	Succeeded by Lee G. Gentile
Preceded by John C. Walker	Commander of the 378th Air Expeditionary Wing; 2020–2021	Succeeded by Robert D. Davis
Preceded by George M. Reynolds	Vice Commander of the United States Air Force Warfare Center; 2021–2022	Succeeded by Curtis R. Bass
Preceded by Barry Cornish	Commander of the Twelfth Air Force; 2022–2024	Succeeded by David A. Mineau
Preceded by Alvin Holsey	Military Deputy Commander of the United States Southern Command; 2024–present	Incumbent
Preceded by Alvin Holsey	Commander of the United States Southern Command; Acting; 2025–2026	Succeeded by Francis Donovan
