= Charles E. Wilhelm =

United States Marine Corps general

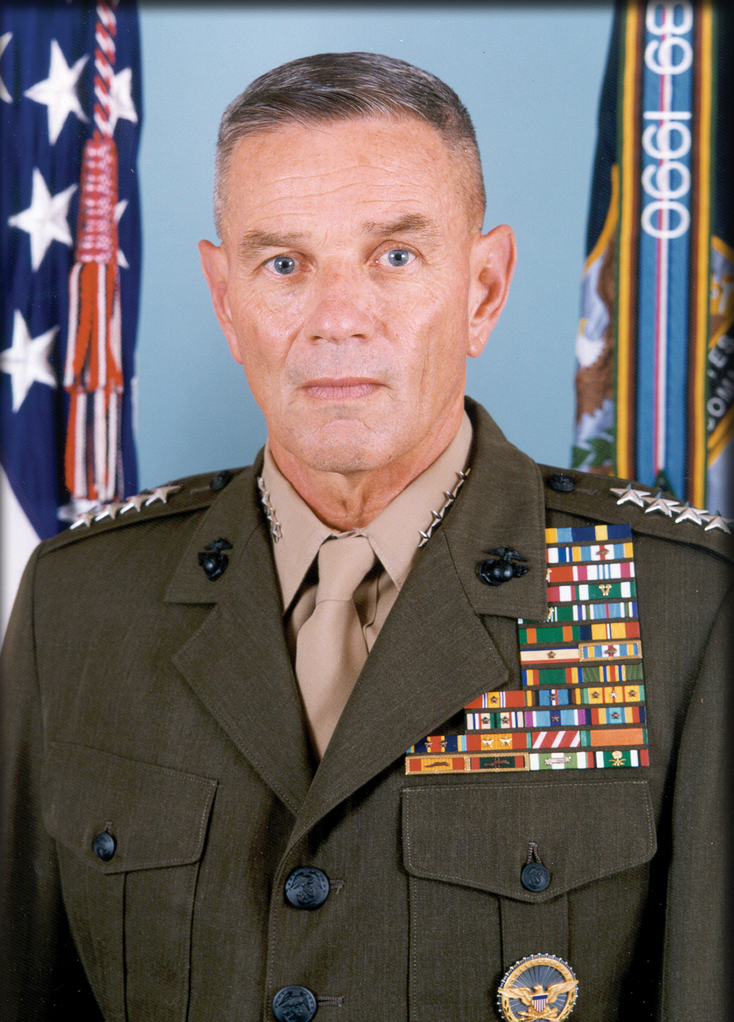
- Charles E. Wilhelm, USMC
- Born: August 26, 1941 (age 85); Edenton, North Carolina, U.S.
- Military career
- Allegiance: United States of America
- Branch: United States Marine Corps
- Service years: 1964–2000
- Rank: General
- Commands: 11th Marine Expeditionary Unit; 1st Marine Division; Marine Corps Combat Development Command; Fleet Marine Force, Atlantic; U.S. Southern Command
- Conflicts: Vietnam War
- Awards: Defense Distinguished Service Medal; Distinguished Service Medal; Silver Star; Defense Superior Service Medal (2); Bronze Star
- Other work: Research, U.S. Army War College; Fellow, Center for Defense Information; Vice President, Battelle.

Charles Elliott Wilhelm (born August 26, 1941) is a decorated retired United States Marine Corps General who served two combat tours of duty in Vietnam. He later served as Commanding General of the 1st Marine Division; as a Deputy Assistant Secretary of Defense; and as the Commander, U.S. Southern Command (1997–2000). General Wilhelm retired from the Marine Corps in 2000, after 37 years of service.

== Biography ==
Charles E. Wilhelm was born in 1941, a native of Edenton, North Carolina. Wilhelm graduated from Florida Southern College in 1964 with a B.A. in journalism. He earned a M.S. degree in management from Salve Regina College in 1971. He is a graduate of the Army Infantry Officer's Advance Course (1971) and the Naval War College (1983), which in 1999 awarded him its Naval War College Distinguished Graduate Leadership Award.

=== Military career ===
General Wilhelm held a variety of command positions. He commanded a rifle platoon and company during two tours in Vietnam; served as a company commander in Headquarters Battalion and 3rd Battalion, 8th Marines, 2nd Marine Division; was the Senior Advisor to a Vietnamese Army Battalion; Inspector-Instructor, 4th Reconnaissance Battalion; Deputy Provost Marshal, U.S. Naval Forces Philippines; and commanded the 11th Marine Expeditionary Unit.

General Wilhelm's staff assignments include Assistant Battalion Operations Officer; Operations Officer and Executive Officer, 1st Battalion, 1st Marines. He served on the staffs of III Marine Amphibious Force; Logistics, Plans, and Policy Branch, Installations and Logistics Department, HQMC, and J-3, Headquarters, U.S. European Command.

In August 1988, while assigned as the Assistant Chief of Staff for Operations, II Marine Expeditionary Force, he was promoted to brigadier general, and was subsequently assigned as the Director of Operations, HQMC. In July 1990, he was selected to serve as Deputy Assistant Secretary of Defense for Policy and Missions, Office of the Assistant Secretary of Defense for Special Operations and Low Intensity Conflict. General Wilhelm assumed duties as Commanding General, 1st Marine Division, in July 1992. He served as Commander Marine Forces Somalia from December 1992 to March 1993 as part of the U.S. led coalition in Operation RESTORE HOPE. General Wilhelm was confirmed for promotion to lieutenant general and assumed duties as the Commanding General, Marine Corps Combat Development Command, Quantico, Virginia, July 15, 1994. In August 1995, he was assigned as Commander, U.S. Marine Corps Forces, Atlantic/Commanding General, Fleet Marine Force, Atlantic/Commander, U.S. Marine Corps Forces, Europe/Commander, U.S. Marine Corps Forces, South/Commanding General, II Marine Expeditionary Force/Commanding General, Marine Striking Force Atlantic, Camp Lejeune, North Carolina. He was confirmed for promotion to general and assumed duties as the Commander, U.S. Southern Command on September 25, 1997; he served in this position until October 2000. General Wilhelm retired from the Marine Corps on November 1, 2000.

=== Post-retirement ===
After retiring from the Marine Corps, General Wilhelm was a researcher with the U.S. Army War College Strategic Studies Institute. General Wilhelm is Distinguished Military Fellow on the staff of the Center for Defense Information. In 2003, Wilhelm became Vice President at Battelle, responsible for homeland security issues.

== Awards and decorations ==
General Wilhelm's personal decorations include:

1st Row	Defense Distinguished Service Medal		Navy Distinguished Service Medal	
2nd Row	Silver Star	Defense Superior Service Medal w/ 1 oak leaf cluster	Bronze Star w/ valor device	Defense Meritorious Service Medal
3rd Row	Meritorious Service Medal	Navy and Marine Corps Commendation Medal w/ valor device	Army Commendation Medal w/ valor device	Joint Service Achievement Medal
4th Row	Navy and Marine Corps Achievement Medal	Combat Action Ribbon	Navy Presidential Unit Citation w/ 1 service star	Joint Meritorious Unit Award w/ 1 oak leaf cluster
5th Row	Navy Unit Commendation	Navy Meritorious Unit Commendation	National Defense Service Medal w/ 1 service star	Armed Forces Expeditionary Medal w/ 1 service star
6th Row	Vietnam Service Medal w/ 7 service stars	Southwest Asia Service Medal w/ 2 service stars	Humanitarian Service Medal w/ 1 service star	Navy Sea Service Deployment Ribbon w/ 1 service star
7th Row	Navy & Marine Corps Overseas Service Ribbon w/ 2 service stars	Vietnam Gallantry Cross w/ 2 gold stars	Vietnam Staff Service Medal	Order of the Aztec Eagle, Placard (Mexico)
8th Row	Vietnam Gallantry Cross unit citation	Vietnam Civil Actions unit citation	Vietnam Campaign Medal	Kuwait Liberation Medal (Saudi Arabia)
Badge	Office of the Secretary of Defense Identification Badge			

== See also ==
- Center for Defense Information (CDI)
- Battelle

Military offices
Preceded by Robert B. Johnston	Commanding General of Fleet Marine Force, Atlantic, and II Marine Expeditionary Force; Commander of Marine Corps Forces Atlantic, Europe, and South; 1995–1997	Succeeded by Peter Pace
Preceded by Wesley Clark	Commander of the United States Southern Command; 1997–2000	Succeeded by Peter Pace
