= Alvin Holsey =

U.S. Navy admiral and naval aviator (born 1965)

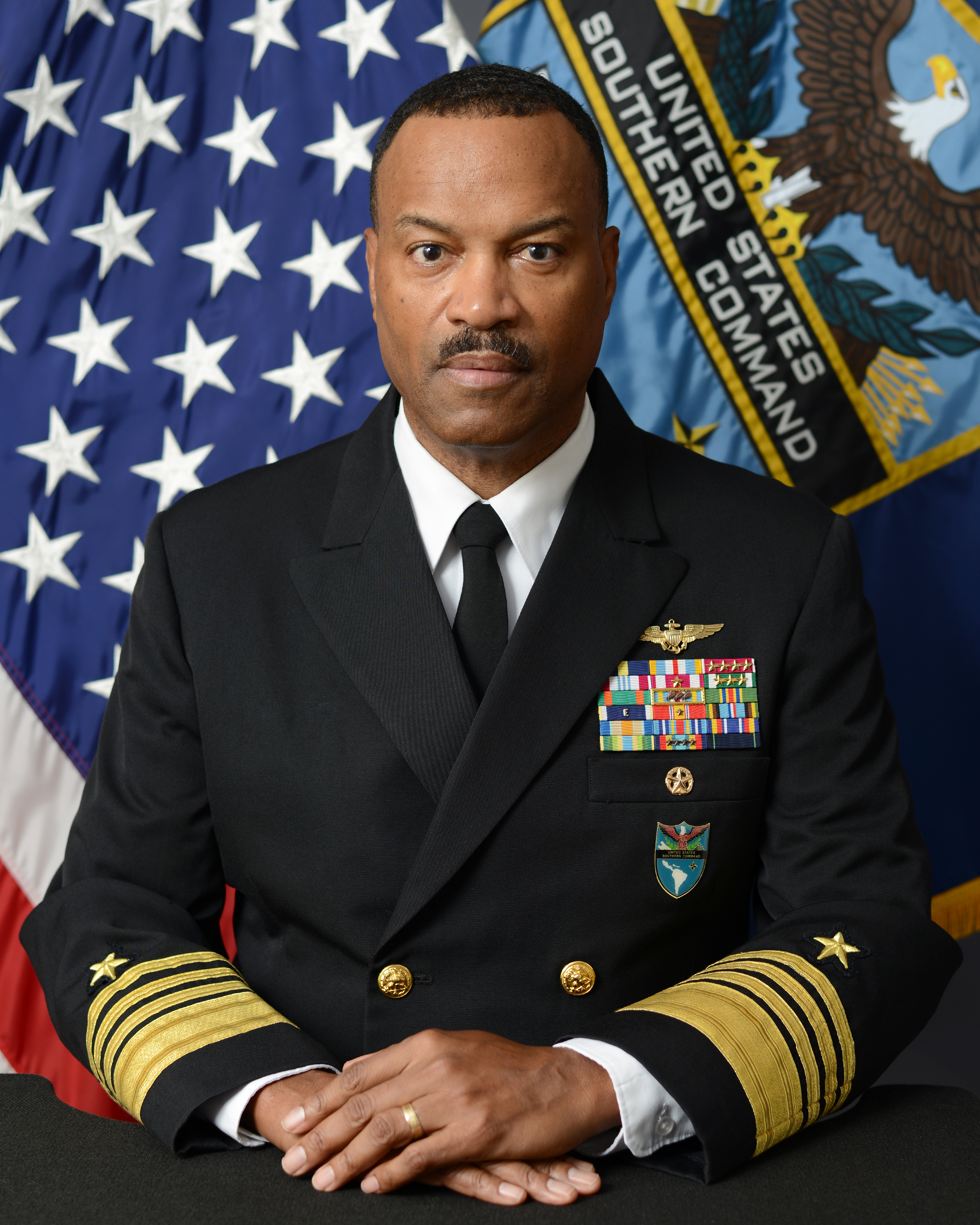
- Born: July 12, 1965 (age 61); Fort Valley, Georgia, U.S.
- Education: Morehouse College (BS); Troy State University (MS); Joint Forces Staff College
- Military career
- Allegiance: United States
- Branch: United States Navy
- Service years: 1988–2025
- Rank: Admiral
- Nickname: Bull
- Commands: United States Southern Command; Navy Personnel Command; Carrier Strike Group 1 USS Makin Island (LHD-8); Helicopter Anti-Submarine Squadron Light Three Seven (HSL-37)
- Awards: Navy Distinguished Service Medal; Defense Superior Service Medal; Legion of Merit (5)
- Alvin Holsey's voice Holsey's opening statement at his confirmation hearing to be Commander, United States Southern Command; Recorded September 12, 2024

Alvin Holsey (born 1965) is a retired United States Navy admiral, and a naval aviator, who served as the commander of United States Southern Command from November 2024 to December 2025. He served as military deputy commander of the United States Southern Command from 2023 to 2024. Holsey was commander of the Navy Personnel Command and Deputy Chief of Naval Personnel from 2021 to 2022. His command assignments also include leading Carrier Strike Group 1 from 2018 to 2020, and serving as commanding officer of the U.S. Navy's first hybrid electric propulsion warship, the USS Makin Island (LHD-8) from 2013 to 2014 after acting as its executive officer from February 2012.

== Career ==
A native of Fort Valley, Georgia, Holsey was commissioned through the Naval Reserve Officers Training Corps (NROTC) program at Morehouse College in 1988, where he received a bachelor's degree in Computer Science and joined Omega Psi Phi fraternity. In 1995, he earned a Master of Science in Management from Troy State University and attended the Joint Forces Staff College in 2010. Over his career, he commanded helicopter squadrons, led Carrier Strike Group One, and helped establish the International Maritime Security Construct, a multinational coalition to protect navigation in the Middle East.

In September 2022, Holsey was nominated for promotion to vice admiral, and assignment as the military deputy commander of U.S. Southern Command. In July 2024, Holsey was nominated for promotion to admiral and for the role of commander at United States Southern Command, a post that typically spans three years.

Under his leadership, SOUTHCOM strengthened security in the Caribbean, reached a historic drug interdiction milestone by seizing and disrupting more than a million pounds of cocaine; expanded the U.S. security partnership with Panama to a level not seen in decades; provided robust logistical support to the Multinational Security Support Mission in Haiti; and stood up Joint Task Force Southern Guard to support the Department of Homeland Security. The admiral also oversaw U.S. military support to Jamaica following Hurricane Melissa, where U.S. forces conducted more than 128 flights to deliver thousands of pounds of aid and critical equipment to hard-hit communities. Holsey’s career includes numerous deployments aboard U.S. Navy frigates and cruisers, as well as missions flying the SH-2F Seasprite and SH-60B Seahawk helicopters. He commanded a helicopter anti-submarine squadron; the U.S. Navy’s first hybrid electric propulsion warship, USS Makin Island (LHD 8); and Carrier Strike Group One aboard the aircraft carrier USS Carl Vinson, (CVN 70). Holsey previously served as Military Deputy Commander at SOUTHCOM prior to assuming command.

In October 2025, Secretary of Defense Pete Hegseth stated that Holsey was retiring at the end of the year. At the time, he was overseeing a Caribbean naval deployment that was the largest he had overseen in his career. Media reports allude Holsey was asked to step down and offered to resign during a tense October meeting with Hegseth, in which he raised questions about the legality of the U.S. military strikes on alleged drug trafficking boats in the Caribbean. Holsey retired on December 12.

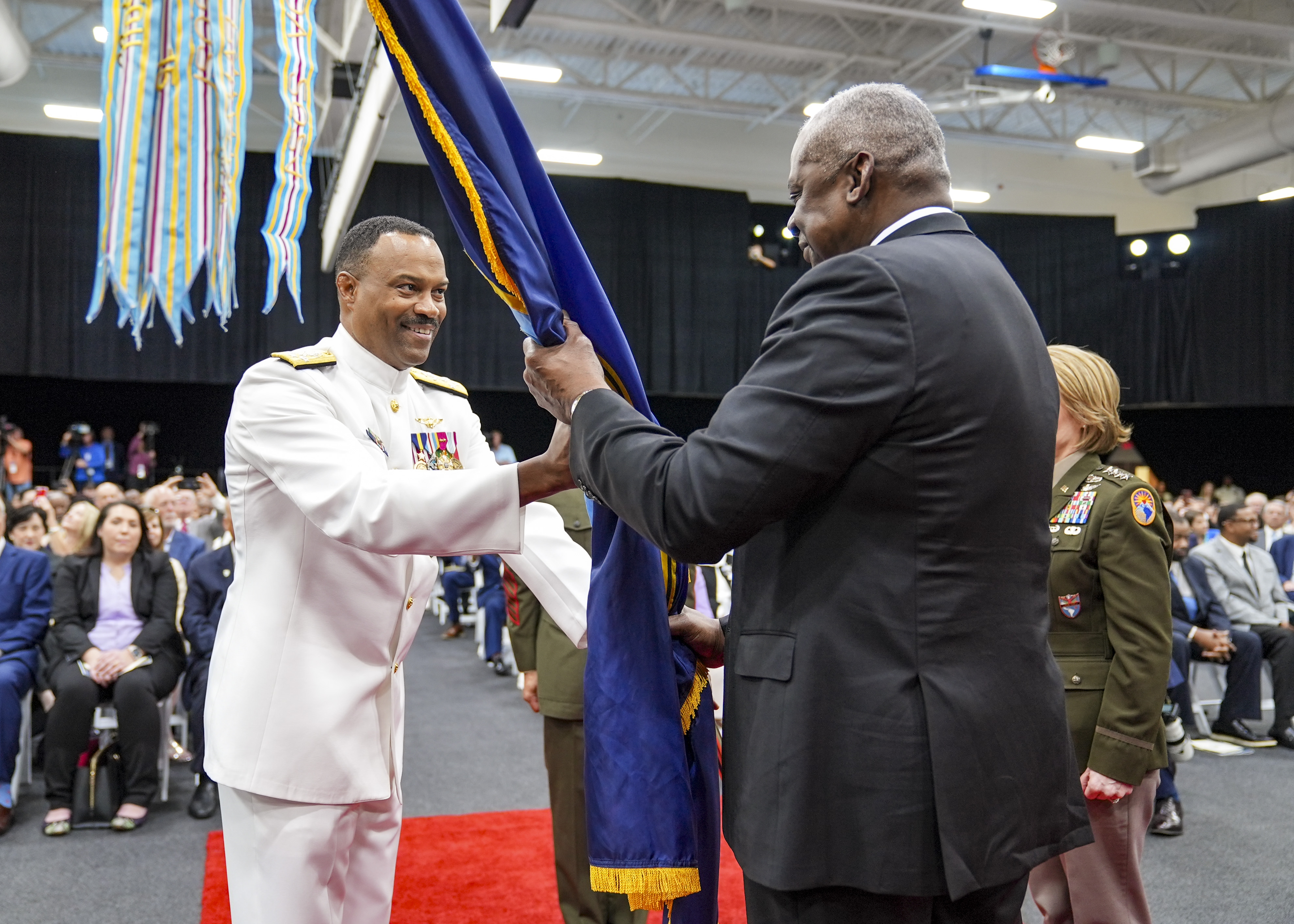
Holsey accepts the USSOUTHCOM command guidon from Secretary of Defense Lloyd Austin on 7 November 2024

== Awards and decorations ==

Naval Aviator's Badge
Defense Distinguished Service Medal
Navy Distinguished Service Medal	Defense Superior Service Medal	Legion of Merit with four award stars
Defense Meritorious Service Medal	Meritorious Service Medal with award star	Navy and Marine Corps Commendation Medal with three award stars
Navy and Marine Corps Achievement Medal	Joint Meritorious Unit Award	Navy Meritorious Unit Commendation
Navy E Ribbon, 1st award	National Defense Service Medal with bronze service star	Armed Forces Expeditionary Medal
Inherent Resolve Campaign Medal	Global War on Terrorism Expeditionary Medal	Global War on Terrorism Service Medal
Armed Forces Service Medal	Navy Sea Service Deployment Ribbon with three bronze service stars	Navy Pistol Marksmanship Ribbon
Command at Sea insignia
Office of the Joint Chiefs of Staff Identification Badge

Military offices
Preceded by Cedric E. Pringle	Commanding Officer of USS Makin Island (LHD-8); 2013–2014	Succeeded by Jon P. Rodgers
Preceded by John V. Fuller	Commander of Carrier Strike Group 1; 2018–2020	Succeeded by Timothy J. Kott
Preceded by Jeffrey W. Hughes	Commander of the Navy Personnel Command and Deputy Chief of Naval Personnel; 2021–2022	Succeeded by Wayne M. Baze
Preceded by Andrew A. Croft	Military Deputy Commander of the United States Southern Command; 2023–2024	Succeeded by Evan Pettus
Preceded by Laura J. Richardson	Commander of the United States Southern Command; 2024–2025	Succeeded by Evan Pettus; Acting
U.S. order of precedence (ceremonial)
Preceded by Randall Reed as Commander of U.S. Transportation Command	Order of precedence of the United States as Commander of U.S. Southern Command	Succeeded by William J. Hartman as acting Commander of U.S. Cyber Command
