= George V. Underwood Jr. =

United States Army general (1913–1984)

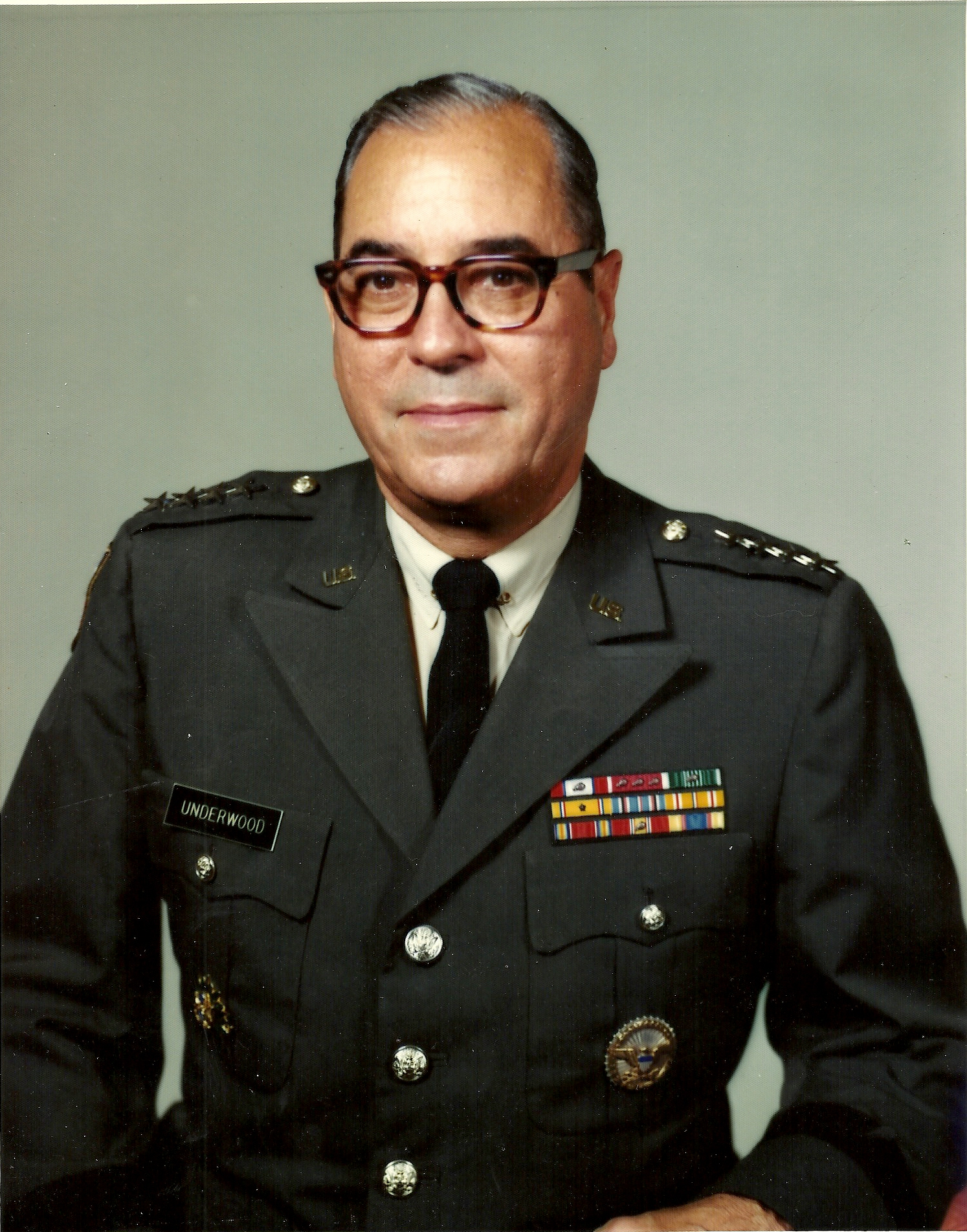
- General George V. Underwood, Commander in Chief, United States Southern Command
- Born: 17 December 1913; Indianapolis, Indiana
- Died: 3 August 1984 (aged 70); Alexandria, Virginia
- Burial place: Fort Bliss National Cemetery
- Military career
- Allegiance: United States of America
- Branch: United States Army
- Service years: 1937–1973
- Rank: General
- Commands: United States Southern Command United States Army Air Defense Command
- Conflicts: World War II; Cold War
- Awards: Distinguished Service Medal (2); Legion of Merit (4); Army Commendation Medal (2)

George Vernon Underwood Jr. (17 December 1913 – 3 August 1984) was a United States Army four-star general who served as Commander in Chief, United States Southern Command (USCINCSO) from 1971 to 1973. He graduated from Shortridge High School in Indianapolis in 1931 and attended Wabash College in Crawfordsville for two years. He graduated from the United States Military Academy in 1937 and was commissioned a second lieutenant in the Coast Artillery Corps.

Prior to World War II, he served as a battery grade officer with artillery units at Fort Scott in San Francisco, at Fort Kamahameha in the Territory of Hawaii, and at Fort Rodman in New Bedford, Massachusetts.

He attended the Command and General Staff School at Fort Leavenworth, Kansas, in 1941. After serving as operations and training officer of the Harbor Defenses of Narragansett Bay, Fort Adams, Rhode Island, General Underwood was selected to attend the Task Force Staff Officers' Course conducted by the Operations Division of the War Department General Staff.

Upon completing this course, he was retained in the Operations Division where he served until 1945. In August, 1945, he was assigned to Headquarters, China Theater, where he served as Assistant Chief of Staff, G-5, (Civil Affairs), then as Chief of the Control Section of the Office of the Chief of Staff, and finally as Chief of the Plans Division.

In June 1946, General Underwood was sent to Washington, D.C., to serve as Assistant to the Special Representative of General George C. Marshall, who was then the Presidential Envoy to China. General Underwood returned to China in October, 1946, as Executive Officer to General Marshall. Upon his return from China in May 1947, he was assigned to the Plans and Operations Division, War Department General Staff.

General Underwood graduated from the Armed Forces Staff College in July 1949. He then commanded the 867th Antiaircraft Artillery Automatic Weapons Battalion in Alaska until May 1951. From May 1951 until March 1953, he served as Deputy Director and then Director of the Executive Offices of the Secretary of Defense in Washington, D.C.

General Underwood graduated from the U.S. Army War College in 1954 and remained as a member of the faculty until 1957. As Commanding Officer, 2d Artillery Group, he commanded the Nike Defense of the Niagara-Buffalo Area from August 1957 until December 1958.

After eighteen months of study at University of Wisconsin–Madison, he received a Master of Arts in Journalism in 1960. He joined the Office of the Chief of Information, Department of the Army, in July 1960 and served as Assistant Chief of Information until January 1961. He was designated Deputy Chief of Information in January 1961 and Chief of Information in February 1963. He became a Major General on 24 July 1963.

In February, 1966, General Underwood was assigned as the Commanding General, 32d Artillery Brigade, in Kaiserslautern, Germany. On 11 May 1966, the 32d Artillery Brigade was redesignated the 32d Army Air Defense Command (AADC). Underwood was commander of Fort Bliss from 1967 to 1968 and later was commander, Aerospace Defense Command and commander, Fifth United States Army. He commanded the Southern Command from 1971 until retiring in 1973.

General Underwood received the Distinguished Service Medal, the Legion of Merit with 2 Oak Leaf Clusters, the Army Commendation Ribbon with One Oak Leaf Cluster, and the Special Breast Order of Yun Hui (Chinese).

He married Mary Heistand Underwood (née Scott) on 16 June 1948 and had three children: Scotty, Molly and Mary Kate.

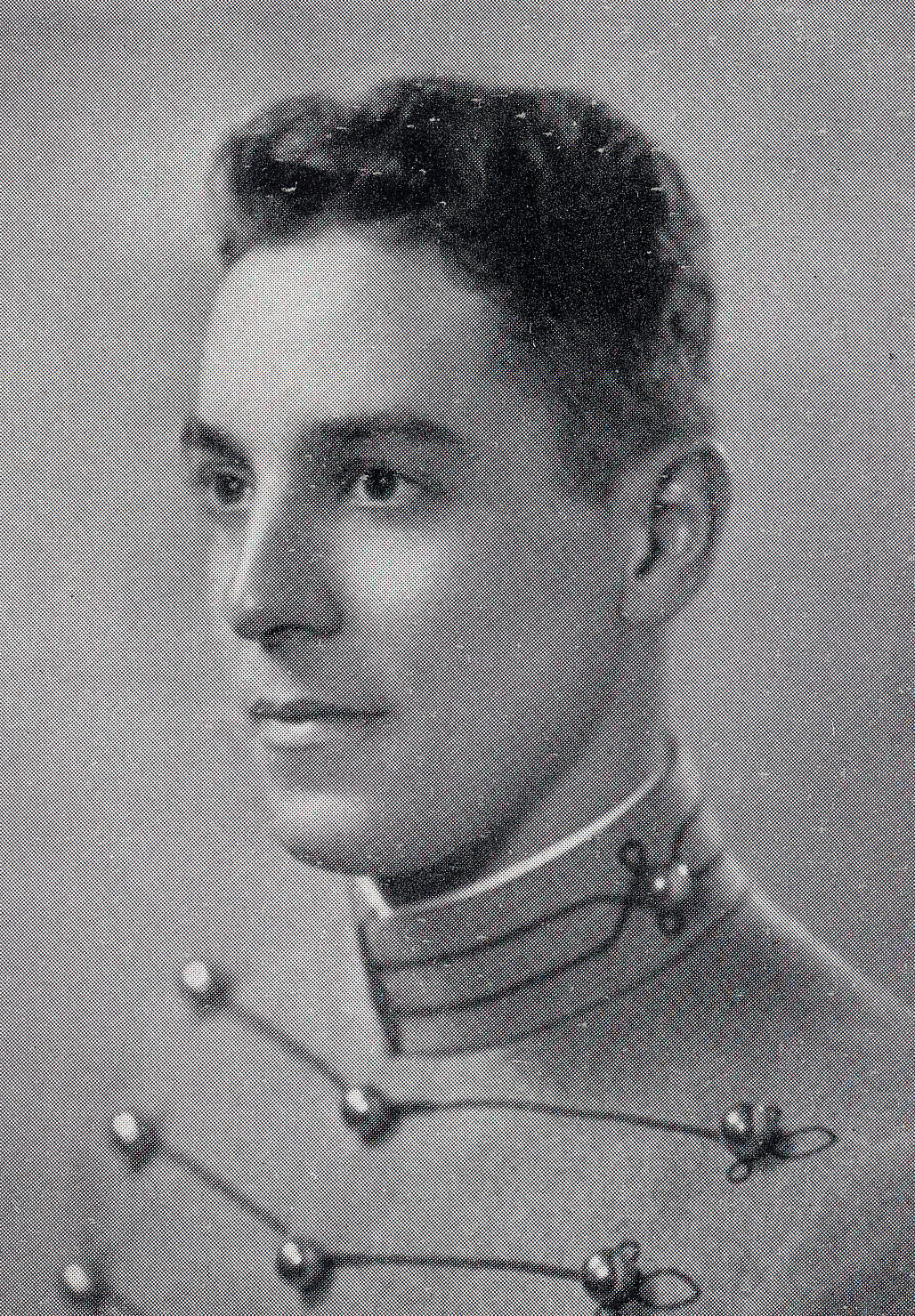
Underwood Jr. as a United States Military Academy cadet c. 1937

== Honors ==
The golf complex at Fort Bliss is named after him.
