= Gary D. Speer =

U.S. Army lieutenant general

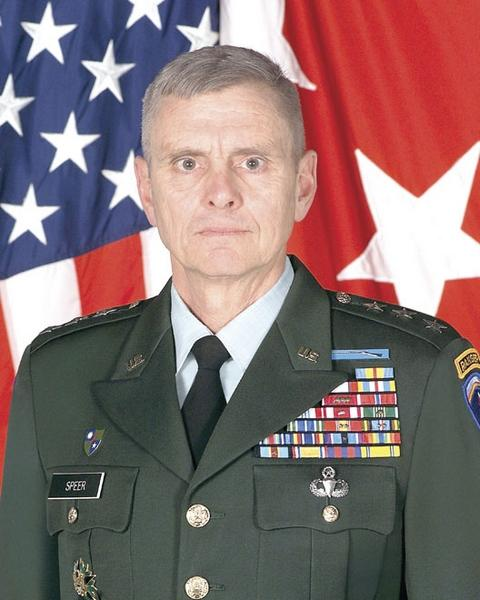
- Speer as deputy commander of U.S. Army Europe, circa 2008
- Born: April 4, 1950 (age 76); Gadsden, Alabama, U.S.
- Education: United States Military Academy; Webster University
- Spouse: Catherine Tucker (m. 1974)
- Military career
- Service: United States Army
- Service years: 1972–2009
- Rank: Lieutenant General
- Unit: U.S. Army Infantry Branch
- Commands: Company B, 1st Battalion, 46th Infantry; 2nd Battalion, 60th Infantry; 2nd Battalion, 75th Ranger Regiment; 3rd Brigade, 25th Infantry Division; 10th Mountain Division (Rear Detachment); United States Southern Command (acting); United States Army Europe and Seventh Army (acting)
- Conflicts: Operation Uphold Democracy; Iraq War
- Awards: Defense Distinguished Service Medal; Army Distinguished Service Medal; Defense Superior Service Medal; Legion of Merit
- Other work: Management consultant

Gary D. Speer (April 4, 1950) is a retired career officer of the United States Army. A veteran of Operation Uphold Democracy and the Iraq War, he served from 1972 to 2009 and attained the rank of lieutenant general and served in senior command and staff positions including acting commander of United States Army Europe, deputy commander of United States Army Central, acting commander of United States Southern Command, and deputy commander of United States Army South. His awards included the Defense Distinguished Service Medal, Army Distinguished Service Medal, Defense Superior Service Medal, and Legion of Merit.

== Early life ==
Speer was born in Gadsden, Alabama on April 4, 1950, a son of James R. Speer, known as Ralph, and Louise (Barnes) Speer. Ralph Speer was a United States Navy veteran of World War II who attained the rank of command master chief petty officer in the Navy Reserve and was the longtime chief of Gadsden's fire department. Speer graduated from Gadsden High School in 1968 and was appointed to the United States Military Academy (West Point) by U.S. Senator J. Lister Hill. He graduated with a Bachelor of Science degree in 1972 and received his commission as a second lieutenant of Infantry. Speer subsequently received a Master of Arts degree in Management from Webster University.

== Military education ==
Speer completed the Infantry Officer Basic Course (1972) and Infantry Officer Advanced Course (1978). He is also a graduate of the United States Army Airborne School and the U.S. Army Ranger School. His later professional education included the programs of instruction at the United States Army Command and General Staff College (1982) and United States Army War College (1991).

== Start of career ==
From April 1973 to September 1974, Speer was assigned as a platoon leader, later executive officer, with Company C, 1st Battalion, 503rd Infantry Regiment, a unit of 101st Airborne Division at Fort Campbell, Kentucky. From September 1974 to December 1977 he was assigned to Fort Stewart, Georgia as a platoon leader and executive officer of Company A, 1st Battalion, 75th Ranger Regiment, then as the battalion's logistics officer (S-4).

From October 1978 to June 1979, he was posted to West Germany as S-4 of 1st Battalion, 46th Infantry. He was commander of Company B, 1st Battalion, 46th Infantry from June 1979 to June 1981. From June 1982 to May 1984, he was assigned as a staff officer in the office of the army's Deputy Chief of Staff for Logistics (G-4) at the Pentagon.

Speer served as executive officer of 2nd Battalion, 75th Ranger Regiment at Fort Lewis, Washington from June 1984 to January 1987. From January 1987 to June 1988, he was executive officer of 3rd Brigade, 9th Infantry Division at Fort Lewis. He commanded 2nd Battalion, 60th Infantry at Fort Lewis from June 1988 to May 1990. From June 1991 to June 1992, he commanded 2nd Battalion, 75th Ranger Regiment at Fort Lewis.

== Continued career ==
From July 1992 to June 1994, Speer served at the United States Department of State as Director of Special Operations in the Office of Counter-Terrorism. From June 1994 to August 1996, he commanded 3rd Brigade, 25th Infantry Division at Schofield Barracks, Hawaii. This posting included service in Haiti for Operation Uphold Democracy from January to April 1995.

From August 1996 to July 1998, Speer was posted to Fort Clayton, Panama as deputy commander of United States Army South. He was assigned as assistant division commander for operations with the 10th Mountain Division and commander of the 10th Mountain Division's Rear Detachment at Fort Drum, New York from July 1998 to July 2000. From July 2000 to October 2002, he was deputy commander and acting commander of United States Southern Command. He served as deputy chief of staff (G-3) for United States Army Europe and Seventh Army in Germany from October 2002 to May 2004.

== Later career ==
Speer served as deputy commander of Third United States Army at Fort McPherson, Georgia from June 2004 to November 2005. During this assignment, he was posted to Camp Arifjan, Kuwait as deputy commander of the Coalition Forces Land Component Command during Operation Iraqi Freedom. From December 2005 to April 2006 he served as acting deputy commander and chief of staff for United States Army Forces Command at Fort McPherson.

From April 2006 to May 2008, Speer was assigned as deputy commander and chief of staff for United States Army Europe and Seventh Army in Germany. He served as acting commander of United States Army Europe and Seventh Army and acting commander of U.S. Army, North Atlantic Treaty Organization from June to August 2008. He then resumed serving as deputy commander and chief of staff for U.S. Army Europe and Seventh Army. Speer retired in November 2009.

== Retirement ==
In retirement, Speer was a resident of St. James City, Florida. He was active in several businesses, including serving on the board of directors of Independent Rough Terrain Center (IRTC), a manufacturer of specialty rough terrain material handling equipment. He was also president of GCS Associates, a venture that provided management consulting services. In addition, he was a leadership coach with True Growth, a Nashville, Tennessee management consulting firm.

== Effective dates of promotion ==
Speer's effective dates of promotion were:

- Second Lieutenant, June 7, 1972
- First Lieutenant, June 7, 1974
- Captain, June 7, 1976
- Major, December 1, 1981
- Lieutenant Colonel, February 1, 1988
- Colonel, June 1, 1992
- Brigadier General, June 1, 1998
- Major General, October 1, 2001
- Lieutenant general, April 3, 2006
- Lieutenant General (Retired), November 1, 2009

== Awards and decorations ==
The major awards and decorations Speer received during his career included:

- Defense Distinguished Service Medal
- Army Distinguished Service Medal (with Oak Leaf Cluster)
- Defense Superior Service Medal
- Legion of Merit (with 3 Oak Leaf Clusters)
- Bronze Star Medal
- Defense Meritorious Service Medal
- Meritorious Service Medal (with 5 Oak Leaf Clusters)
- Army Commendation Medal (with Oak Leaf Cluster)
- Army Achievement Medal
- Expert Infantryman Badge
- Master Parachutist Badge
- Ranger Tab
- Army Staff Identification Badge

Speer was also inducted into the U.S. Army Ranger Hall of Fame and was designated a Distinguished Member of the 75th Ranger Regiment.
