= Robert W. Porter Jr. =

United States Army general

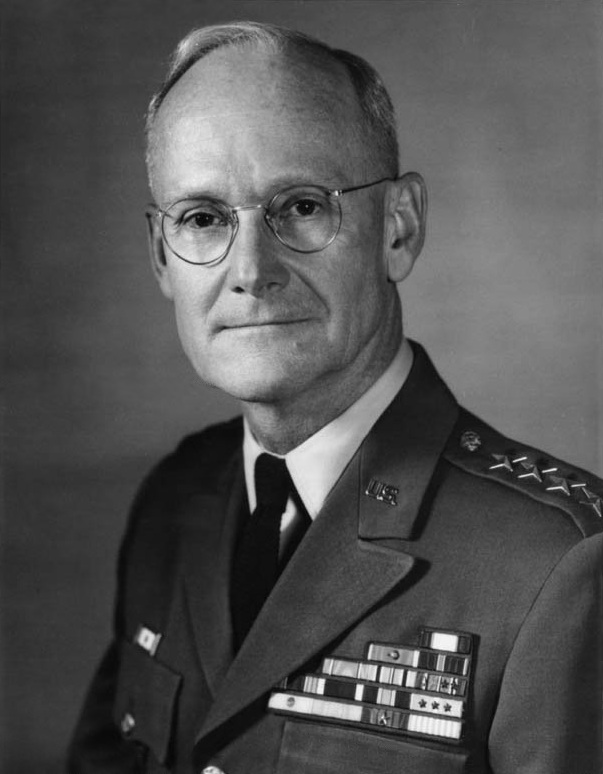
- General Robert W. Porter Jr.
- Born: 29 April 1908; Alma, Nebraska
- Died: 22 April 2000 (aged 91); Charlottesville, Virginia
- Military career
- Allegiance: United States
- Branch: United States Army
- Service years: 1930–1969
- Rank: General
- Commands: United States Southern Command; First United States Army; 3rd Armored Division; 2nd Armored Cavalry Regiment
- Conflicts: World War II; Korean War
- Awards: Army Distinguished Service Medal (2); Legion of Merit (2); Bronze Star Medal
- Other work: Tree farmer

Robert William Porter Jr. (29 April 1908 – 22 April 2000) was a United States Army four-star general who served as Commander in Chief, United States Southern Command from 1965 to 1969.

== Military career ==
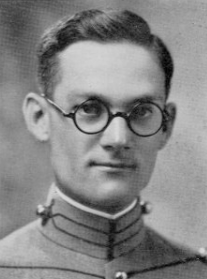
As a West Point cadet

Porter was born in Alma, Nebraska, on 29 April 1908. After graduating from high school, he entered the United States Military Academy, graduating in 1930. He began his career in the cavalry. During World War II, he served with the 1st Infantry Division in North Africa and Sicily, and with II Corps in Italy. Returning to the War Department in 1945, he served as a strategic planner, and later became executive officer to the Under Secretary of the Army.

After graduating from the National War College in 1950, Porter held a variety of positions to include commander, 2nd Armored Cavalry Regiment; Deputy G-3, Allied Land Forces Central Europe; Chief of Staff, X Corps; member of the National Security Council Planning Board; Commander, 3rd Armored Division; United States Representative to the Permanent Deputies Group, Central Treaty Organization. From April 1964 to 1965 he commanded the First United States Army at Fort Jay, Governors Island, New York. His final assignment was Commander-in-Chief, United States Southern Command.

Porter's awards and decorations included the Army Distinguished Service Medal with oak leaf cluster, the Legion of Merit with oak leaf cluster, and the Bronze Star Medal.

== Later life ==
After retiring from the army, Porter became a tree farmer in Virginia, winning the title Virginia Tree Farmer of the Year in 1995. He died on 22 April 2000, at the Martha Jefferson Hospital in Charlottesville, Virginia, after a heart attack.
