= United States Southern Command =

Command responsible for South American area

- Founded: 11 June 1963 (63 years, 5 months ago)
- Country: United States
- Type: Unified combatant command
- Role: Geographic combatant command
- Size: 1,200 personnel
- Part of: United States Department of Defense
- Headquarters: Doral, Florida, United States
- Engagements: United States invasion of Grenada; Invasion of Panama; Operation Uphold Democracy; Operation Secure Tomorrow; Operation New Horizons; Operation Unified Response; Operation Continuing Promise; Operation Southern Spear
- Decorations: Order of San Carlos
- Website: www.southcom.mil

Commanders
- Commander: General Francis L. Donovan, USMC
- Military Deputy Commander: Lieutenant General Evan L. Pettus, USAF
- Civilian Deputy to the Commander: Ambassador Stephanie Syptak-Ramnath, DOS
- Command Senior Enlisted Leader: Sergeant major Rafael Rodriguez, USMC

Insignia
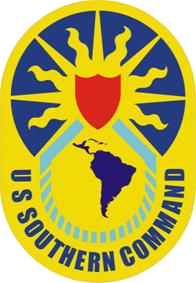
- Distinctive Unit Insignia

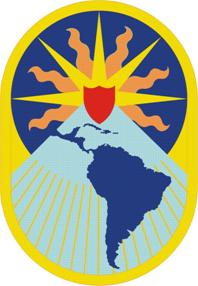
- US Southern Command Army Element SSI

- NATO Map Symbol

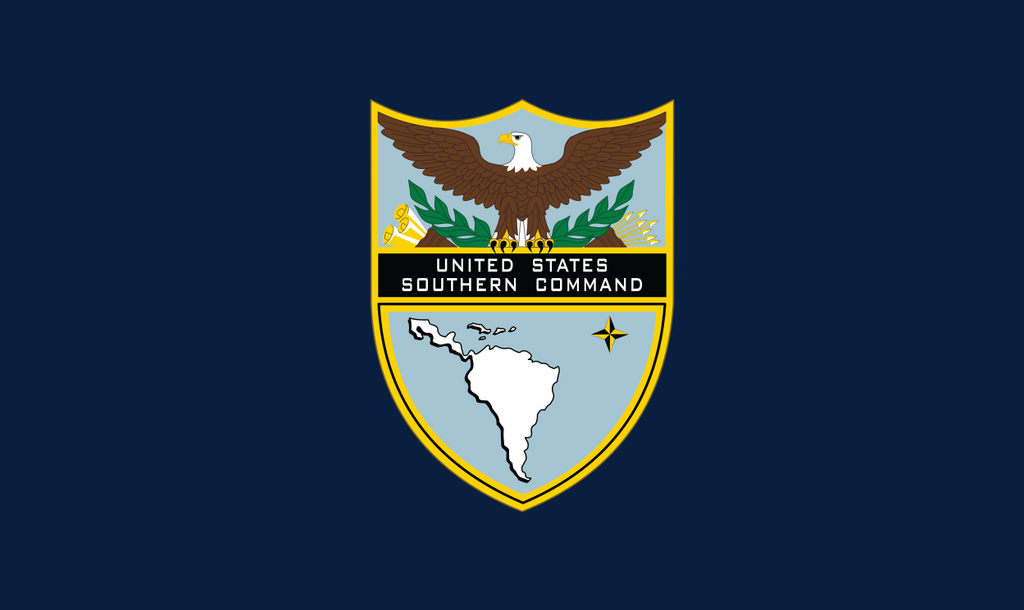
- Unit Flag

The United States Southern Command (USSOUTHCOM) is one of the eleven unified combatant commands in the United States Department of Defense. Located in Doral, Florida, it is responsible for providing contingency planning, operations, and security cooperation for Central and South America, the Caribbean (except in territories of the United States), their territorial waters, and for the force protection of U.S. military resources at these locations. USSOUTHCOM is also responsible for ensuring the defense of the Panama Canal and the canal area.

Under the leadership of a four-star Commander, USSOUTHCOM is organized into a headquarters with six main directorates, component commands and military groups that represent SOUTHCOM in the region. USSOUTHCOM is a joint command of more than 1,201 military and civilian personnel representing the United States Army, Navy, Air Force, Space Force, Marine Corps, Coast Guard, and several other federal agencies. Civilians working at USSOUTHCOM are, for the most part, civilian employees of the Army, as the Army is USSOUTHCOM's Combatant Command Support Agent. The Services provide USSOUTHCOM with component commands which, along with their Joint Special Operations component, two Joint Task Forces, one Joint Interagency Task Force, and Security Cooperation Offices, perform USSOUTHCOM missions and security cooperation activities. USSOUTHCOM exercises its authority through the commanders of its components, Joint Task Forces/Joint Interagency Task Force, and Security Cooperation Organizations.

== Area of responsibility ==
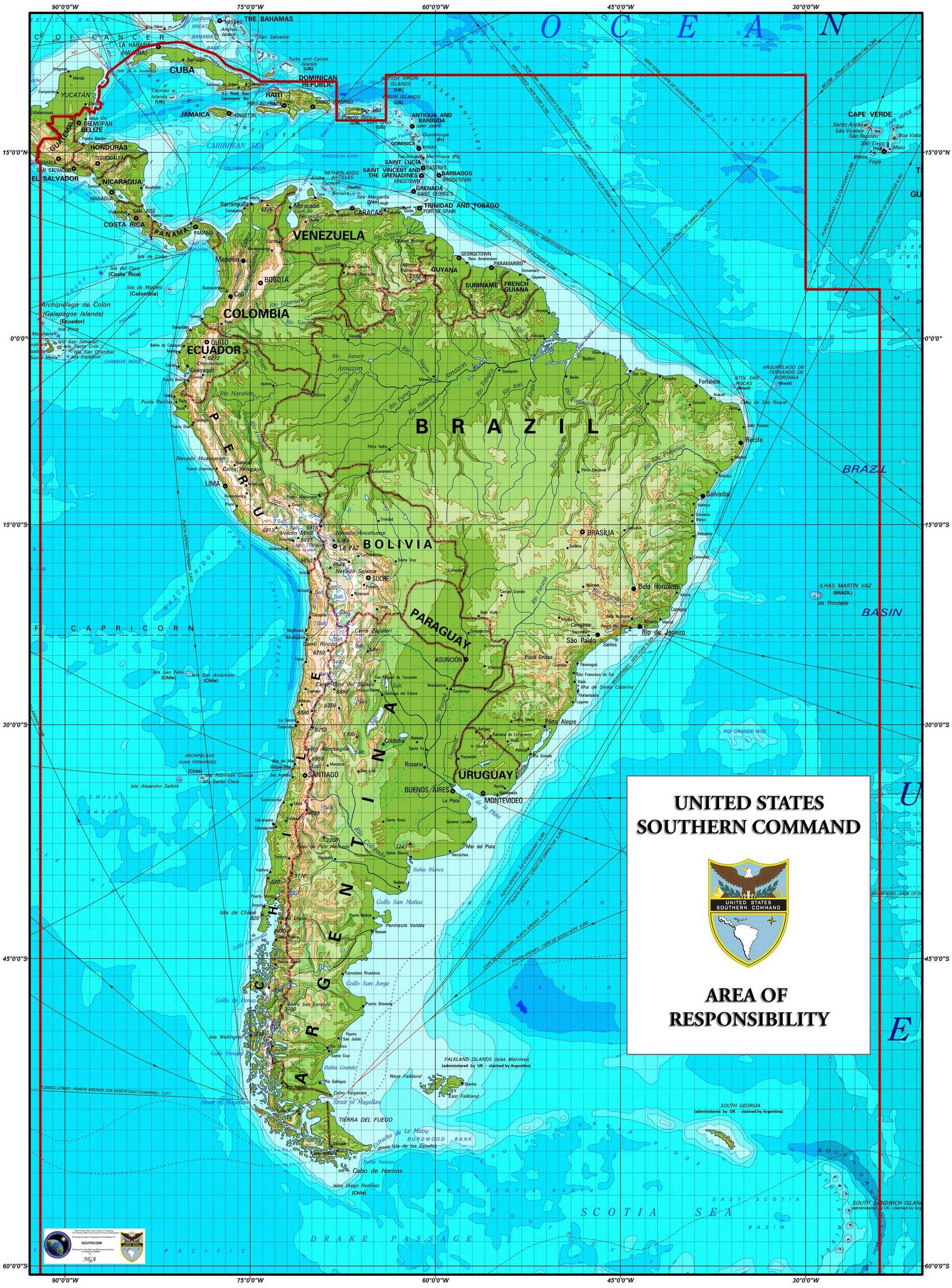
SOUTHCOM Area of Focus

The USSOUTHCOM Area of Responsibility (AOR) encompasses 32 nations (19 in Central and South America and 13 in the Caribbean), of which 31 are democracies, and 14 U.S. and European territories. As of October 2002, the area of focus covered 14.5 million square miles (23.2 million square kilometers.)

The United States Southern Command area of interest includes:

- The land mass of Latin America south of Mexico
- The waters adjacent to Central and South America
- The Caribbean Sea, its 12 island nations and European territories, minus Puerto Rico and the US Virgin Islands.
- A portion of the Atlantic Ocean

== Components ==
USSOUTHCOM accomplishes much of its mission through its service components, four representing each service, one specializing in Special Operations missions, and three additional joint task forces:

=== U.S. Army Western Hemisphere Command ===
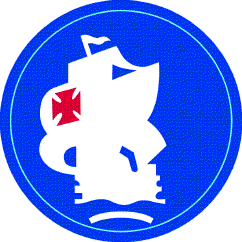

United States Army South (ARSOUTH) forces include aviation, intelligence, communication, and logistics units. Located at Fort Sam Houston, Texas, it supports regional disaster relief and counter-drug efforts. ARSOUTH also exercises oversight, planning, and logistical support for humanitarian and civic assistance projects throughout the region in support of the USSOUTHCOM Theater Security Cooperation Strategy. ARSOUTH provides Title 10 and Executive Agent responsibilities throughout the Latin American and Caribbean region. In 2013, around four thousand troops were deployed in Latin America.

=== Air Forces Southern ===
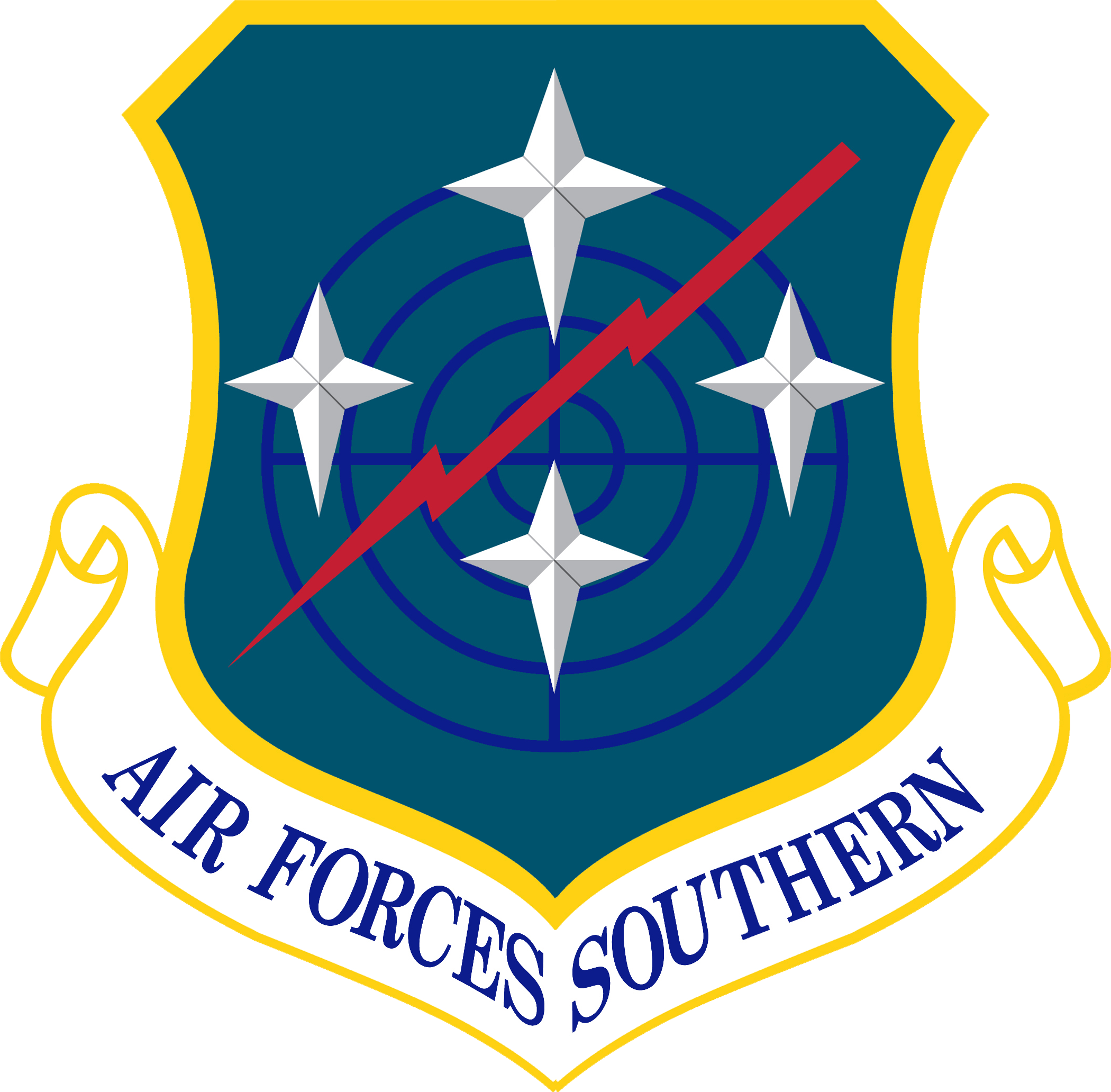

Located at Davis-Monthan Air Force Base, Arizona, AFSOUTH consists of a staff; a Falconer Combined Air and Space Operations Center for command and control of air activity in the USSOUTHCOM area, and an Air Force operations group responsible for Air Force forces in the area. AFSOUTH serves as the executive agent for forward operating locations; provides joint/combined radar surveillance architecture oversight; provides intra-theater airlift; and supports USSOUTHCOM's Theater Security Cooperation Strategy through regional disaster relief exercises and counter-drug operations. AFSOUTH also provides oversight, planning, execution, and logistical support for humanitarians and civic assistance projects and hosts a number of Airmen-to-Airmen conferences. Twelfth Air Force also brought the Chief of Staff of the Air Force's Warfighting Headquarters (WFHQ) concept to life. The WFHQ was composed of a command and control element, an Air Force forces staff and an Air Operations Center. Operating as a WFHQ since June 2004, Twelfth Air Force has served as the Air Force model for the future of Combined Air and Space Operations Centers and WFHQ Air Force forces.

In September 2024 Twelfth Air Force was disestablished, and a new Air Forces Southern, technically an organisation with no previous history, established to continue the SOUTHCOM task.

=== U.S. Naval Forces Southern Command & U.S. Fourth Fleet ===
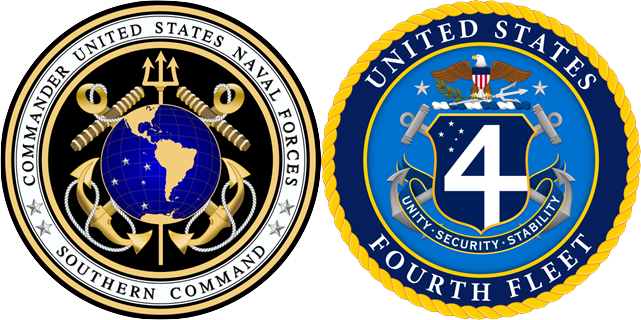

Located at Naval Station Mayport, Florida, USNAVSO exercises command and control over all U.S. naval operations in the USSOUTHCOM area including naval exercises, maritime operations, and port visits. USNAVSO is also the executive agent for the operation of the cooperative security location at Comalapa, El Salvador, which provides basing in support of aerial counter-narcoterrorism operations.

On 24 April 2008, Admiral Gary Roughead, the chief of naval operations, announced that the United States Fourth Fleet would be re-established, effective 1 July, responsible for U.S. Navy ships, aircraft and submarines operating in the Caribbean Sea, as well as Central and South America. Rear Admiral Joseph D. Kernan was named as the fleet commander and Commander, U.S. Naval Forces Southern Command. Up to four ships are deployed in the waters in and around Latin America, at any given time.

=== U.S. Marine Corps Forces, South ===
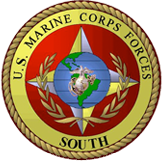

Located in Doral, Florida, USMARFORSOUTH commands all United States Marine Corps Forces (MARFORs) assigned to USSOUTHCOM; advises USSOUTHCOM on the proper employment and support of MARFORs; conducts deployment/redeployment planning and execution of assigned/attached MARFORs; and accomplishes other operational missions as assigned.

=== United States Space Forces – Southern ===
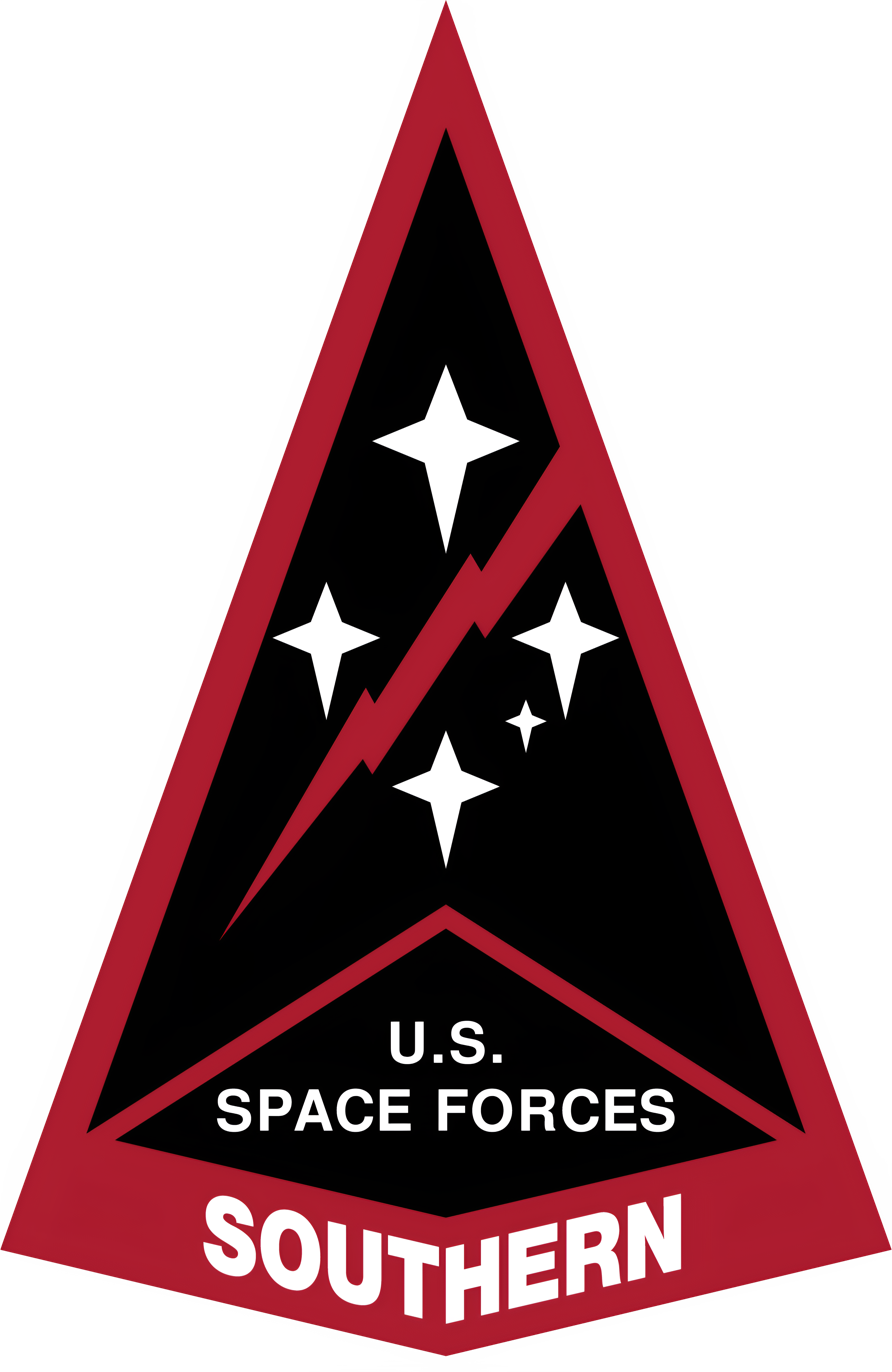

Located at Davis-Monthan Air Force Base. The U.S. Space Force component to U.S. Southern Command responsible for integrating space power with joint, interagency and multinational partners to support regional security, deterrence and stability across Central America, South America and the Caribbean.

=== Special Operations Command South ===
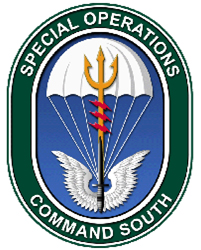

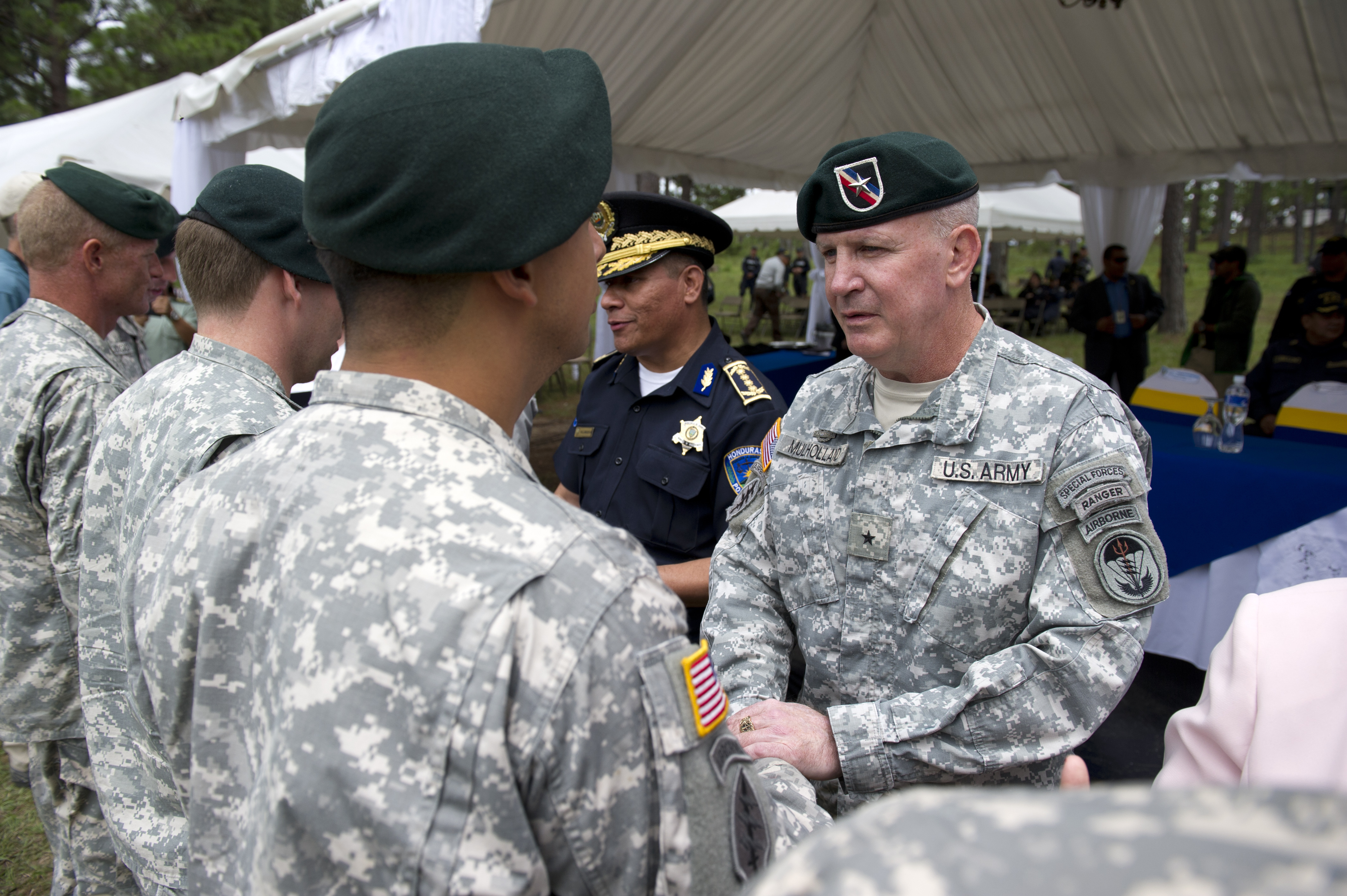
Brigadier General Sean Mulholland, SOCSOUTH Commander in 2014, honors 7th SFG(A) soldiers in Honduras.

Located at Homestead Air Reserve Base near Miami, Florida, Special Operations Command South (SOCSOUTH) provides the primary theater contingency response force and plans, prepares for, and conducts special operations in support of USSOUTHCOM. USSOCSOUTH controls all Special Operations Forces in the region and also establishes and operates a Joint Special Operations Task Force when required. As a Theater Special Operations Command (TSOC), USSOCSOUTH is a sub-unified command of USSOUTHCOM.

SOCSOUTH has five assigned or attached subordinate commands including "Charlie" Company, 3rd Battalion, 7th Special Forces Group (Airborne) (7th SFG(A)); "Charlie" Company, 3rd Battalion, 160th Special Operations Aviation Regiment (Airborne); Naval Special Warfare Unit FOUR; 112th Signal Detachment SOCSOUTH; and Joint Special Operations Air Component-South.

There are also three task forces with specific missions in the region that report to U.S. Southern Command:

=== Joint Task Force Bravo ===
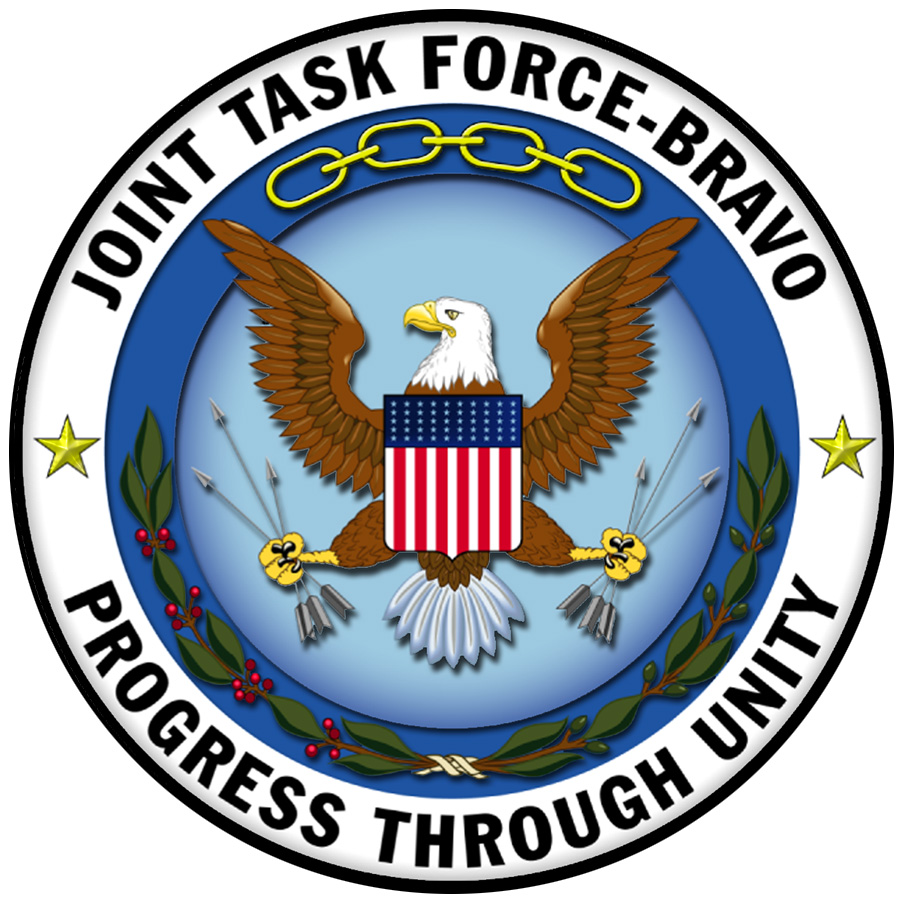

Located at Soto Cano Air Base, Honduras, Joint Task Force (JTF) -Bravo operates a forward, all-weather day/night C-5-capable airbase. JTF – Bravo organizes multilateral exercises and supports, in cooperation with partner nations, humanitarian and civic assistance, counter-drug, contingency and disaster relief operations in Central America.

=== Joint Task Force Guantanamo ===
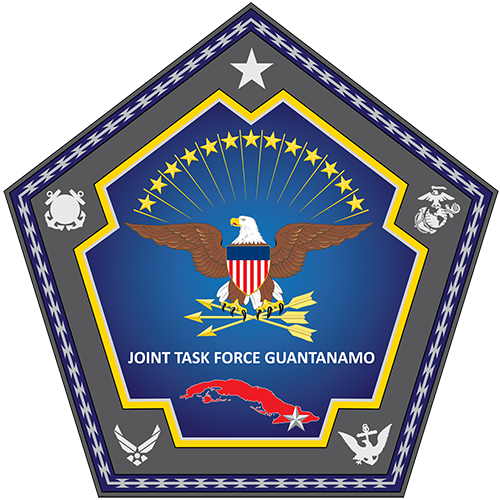

Located at U.S. Naval Station Guantanamo Bay, Cuba, JTF – Guantanamo conducts detention and interrogation operations in support of the war on terrorism, coordinates and implements detainee screening operations, and supports law enforcement and war crimes investigations as well as Military Commissions for Detained Enemy Combatants. JTF – Guantanamo is also prepared to support mass migration operations at Naval Station GTMO.

=== Joint Interagency Task Force South ===
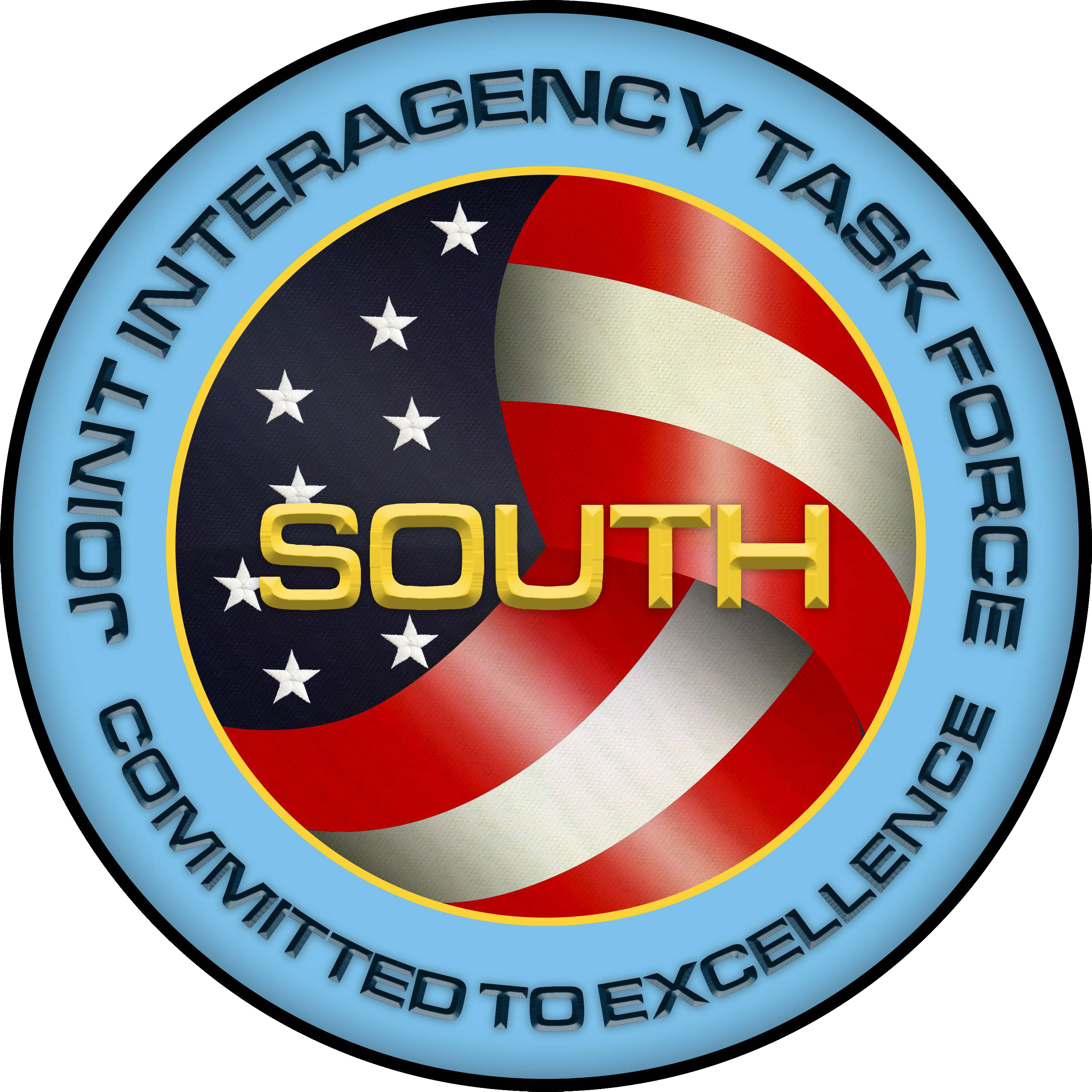

Located in Key West, Florida, JIATF South is an interagency task force that serves as the catalyst for integrated and synchronized interagency counter-drug operations and is responsible for the detection and monitoring of suspect air and maritime drug activity in the Caribbean Sea, Gulf of Mexico, and the eastern Pacific. JIATF- South also collects, processes, and disseminates counter-drug information for interagency operations. Manta Air Base was one of JIATF-South's bases, in Ecuador until 19 September 2009.

== History ==
The first U.S. troops that arrived in Panama were Marines, in 1903. The 10th Infantry Regiment arrived in 1911 to form the core of the Panama Canal Guard. The first overall headquarters for forces at both ends of the Canal was HQ U.S. Troops, Panama Canal Zone, established in 1915. It was superseded by the Panama Canal Department on 1 July 1917, almost three months after the American entry into World War I.

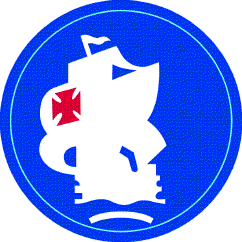
Caribbean Defense Command WWII Shoulder Patch

The Panama Canal Department remained as the senior Army headquarters in the region until activation of the Caribbean Defense Command (CDC) on 10 February 1941. The CDC, co-located at Quarry Heights, was commanded by Lieutenant General Daniel Van Voorhis, who continued to command the Panama Canal Department.

The new command eventually assumed operational responsibility over air and naval forces throughout its area of operations. During World War II, the CDC included all U.S. forces and bases in the Caribbean basin outside the Contiguous United States. General Orders No. 8, issued 29 May 1941, set the boundaries of the command as, "islands in or bordering the Caribbean Sea, the Guianas, Venezuela, Colombia, Ecuador and the countries of Central America (except Mexico)." The same General Order created three sectors: the Trinidad, the Puerto Rican and the Panama Sectors. The core of the new command was from the Panama Canal Department.

On June 1, 1943, the Puerto Rican Department was renamed the Antilles Department, and its territorial limits were extended to include the bases in the British West Indies and British Guiana leased by the United States from the United Kingdom in September 1940. The area of these bases was collectively called, for tactical purposes, the Trinidad Sector, and in January 1944 it was extended to include the Aruba-Curaçao subsector and territory in Venezuela west of Caracas. The Headquarters of the two successive Departments was at San Juan, P.R."

During this time the Sixth Air Force was a part of the CDC. By early 1942, a Joint Operations Center had been established at Quarry Heights. Meanwhile, 960 jungle-trained officers and enlisted men from the CDC deployed to New Caledonia in the southwest Pacific to help form the 5307th Composite Unit (Provisional), codenamed 'Galahad' and later nicknamed Merrill's Marauders for its famous exploits in Burma. In the meantime, military strength in the area was gradually rising and reached its peak in January 1943, when 68,000 personnel were defending the Panama Canal. The Antilles Air Command was established in a CDC reorganisation - its Puerto Rico and Panama Sectors became the Antilles Air Task Force in February, 1943. It was redesignated the Antilles Air Command June 1943.

Military strength was sharply reduced with the termination of World War II. Between 1946 and 1974, total military strength in Panama fluctuated between 6,600 and 20,300 (with the lowest force strength in 1959).

In December 1946, President Harry S. Truman approved recommendations of the Joint Chiefs of Staff for a comprehensive system of military commands to put responsibility for conducting military operations of all military forces in various geographical areas, in the hands of a single commander. Although the Caribbean Command was designated by the Defense Department on 1 November 1947, it did not become fully operational until 10 March 1948, when the old Caribbean Defense Command was inactivated.

On 6 June 1963, reflecting the fact that the command had a responsibility for U.S. military operations primarily in Central and South America, rather than in the Caribbean, President John F. Kennedy and Secretary of Defense Robert McNamara formally redesignated it as the United States Southern Command. The command's mission began to shift with the expansion of the Cold War to Latin America. Kennedy and his successor Lyndon B. Johnson expanded the division in the aftermath of the Cuban Missile Crisis and reoriented it towards irregular warfare against the establishment of another Communist state in the Western Hemisphere. From 1975 until late 1994 total military strength in Panama remained at about 10,000 personnel.

In January 1996 and June 1997, two phases of changes to the Department of Defense Unified Command Plan (UCP) were completed. Each phase of the UCP change added territory to SOUTHCOM's area of responsibility. The impact of the changes is significant. The new AOR includes the Caribbean, its 13 island nations and several U.S. and European territories, the Gulf of Mexico, as well as significant portions of the Atlantic and Pacific Oceans. The 1999 update to the UCP also transferred responsibility of an additional portion of the Atlantic Ocean to SOUTHCOM. On 1 October 2000, Southern Command assumed responsibility of the adjacent waters in the upper quadrant above Brazil, which was presently under the responsibility of U.S. Joint Forces Command.

The new AOR encompasses 32 nations (19 in Central and South America and 13 in the Caribbean), of which 31 are democracies, and 14 U.S. and European territories covering more than 15,600,000 square miles (40,000,000 km^{2}).

With the implementation of the Panama Canal treaties (the Panama Canal Treaty of 1977 and the treaty concerning the Permanent Neutrality and Operations of the Panama Canal), the U.S. Southern Command was relocated in Miami, Florida, on 26 September 1997.

In October 2002 a number of changes were made to the Unified Command Plan, including the creation of U.S. Northern Command. As part of these changes, Southern Command's Area of Responsibility changed decreasing its total boundary by 1.1 square miles. (14.5 million square miles (23.2 million square kilometers.)

A new headquarters building was constructed and opened in 2010 adjacent to the old rented building in the Doral area of Miami-Dade County. The complex has state-of-the-art planning and conference facilities. The 45,000-square-foot Conference Center of the Americas can support meetings of differing classification levels and multiple translations, information sources and video conferencing.

In 2012, as many as a dozen SouthCom service members, together with a number of Secret Service officers, were disciplined after they were found to have brought prostitutes to their rooms shortly before President Obama arrived for a summit in Cartagena, Colombia. According to the Associated Press seven Army soldiers and two Marines received administrative punishments for what an official report cited by the wire service said was misconduct consisting "almost exclusively of patronizing prostitutes and adultery." Hiring prostitutes, the report indicated, is a violation of the Uniform Code of Military Justice. In 2014, SouthCom commander Kelly testified that while border security was an 'Existential' threat to the country, due to Budget sequestration in 2013 his forces were unable to respond to 75% of illicit trafficking events.

USSOUTHCOM's 2017-2027 Theater Strategy states that potential challenges in the future include transregional and transnational threat networks (T3Ns) which include traditional criminal organizations, as well as the expanding potential of extremist organizations such as ISIL and Hezbollah operating in the region by taking advantage of weak Caribbean and Latin American institutions. USSOUTHCOM also notes that the region is "extremely vulnerable to natural disasters and the outbreak of infectious diseases" due to issues with governance and inequality. Finally, the report recognizes the growing presence of China, Iran and Russia in the region, and that the intentions of these nations bring "a challenge to every nation that values nonaggression, rule of law, and respect for human rights". These challenges have been used to promote relationships between the United States and other governments in the region.

On 4 August 2026, USSOUTHCOM activated Joint Task Force Western Hemisphere (JTF-WHEM) to replace Operation Southern Spear. JTF-WHEM will focus on a multinational coalition - Americas Counter Cartel Coalition (A3C) to be a rapid reaction force for anti-narcotics operations, transnational criminal organization operations and humanitarian operations.

== State Partnership Program ==
US SOUTHCOM currently has 22 state partnerships under the state partnership program (SPP). SPP creates a partnership between a state of the U.S. and a foreign nation by linking the host nation military or security forces with the National Guard. SOUTHCOM is equaled only by EUCOM in its number of partnerships.

== Commanders ==
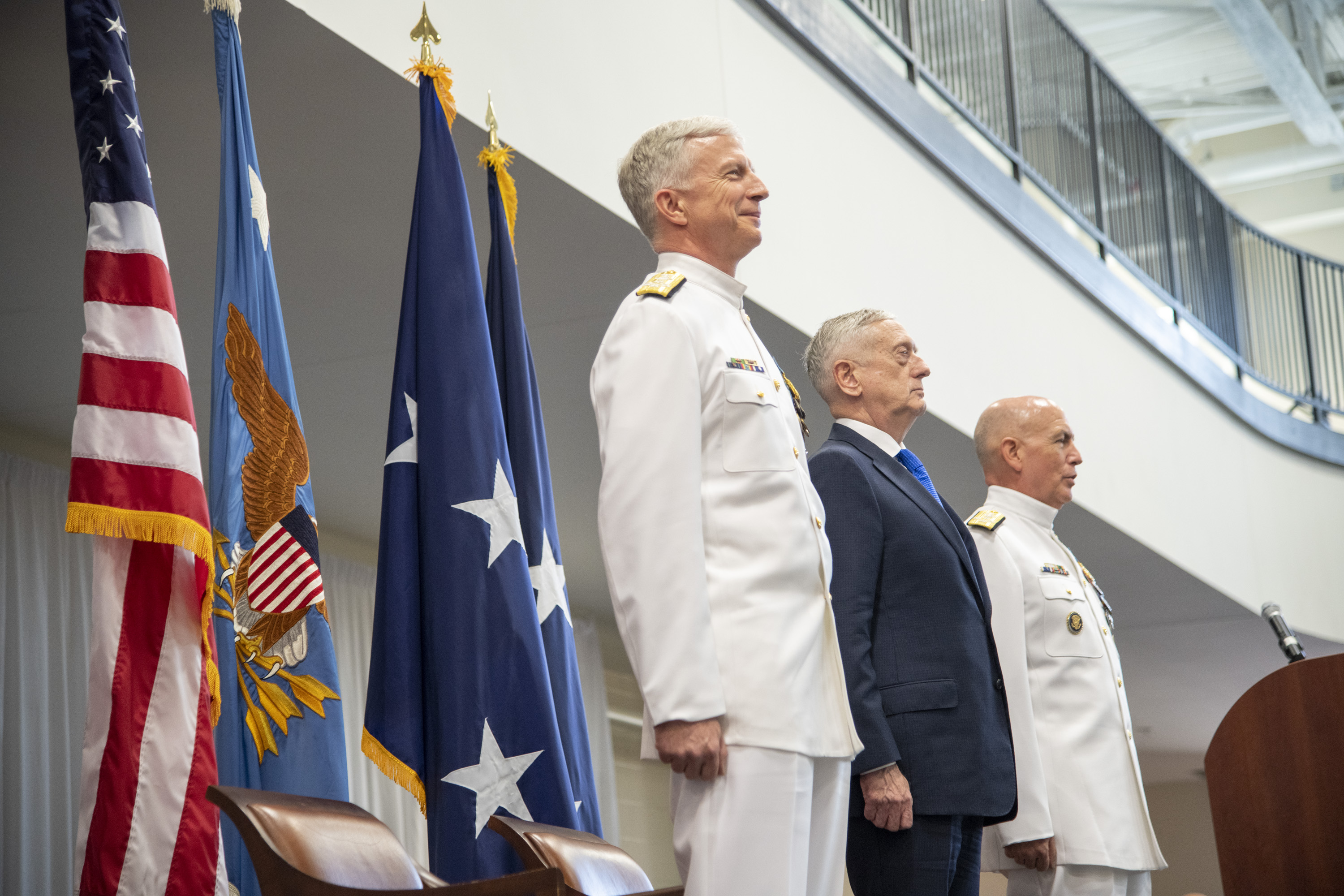
Admiral Craig S. Faller, commander, U.S. Southern Command, Secretary of Defense Jim Mattis, and Admiral Kurt W. Tidd, outgoing commander, share the stage during the SOUTHCOM change of command ceremony on 26 November 2018.

The U.S. Southern Command was activated in 1963, emerging from the U.S. Caribbean Command, established in 1947. Last commander of the U.S. Caribbean Command from January 1961 to June 1963 and first commander of the U.S. Southern Command since June 1963 was Lieutenant General–later General–Andrew P. O'Meara.

No.	Commander		Term			Service branch
No.	Portrait	Name	Took office	Left office	Term length	Service branch
1	Willis D. Crittenberger	Lieutenant General; Willis D. Crittenberger (1890–1980)	1 November 1947	1 June 1948	~ 213 days	U.S. Army
2	Matthew B. Ridgway	Lieutenant General; Matthew B. Ridgway (1895–1993)	1 June 1948	1 October 1949	~ 1 year, 122 days	U.S. Army
3	William H. H. Morris Jr.	Lieutenant General; William H. H. Morris Jr. (1890–1971)	1 October 1949	1 April 1952	~ 2 years, 183 days	U.S. Army
4	Horace L. McBride	Lieutenant General; Horace L. McBride (1894–1962)	1 April 1952	1 June 1954	~ 2 years, 61 days	U.S. Army
5	William K. Harrison Jr.	Lieutenant General; William K. Harrison Jr. (1895–1987)	1 June 1954	1 January 1957	~ 2 years, 214 days	U.S. Army
6	Robert M. Montague	Lieutenant General; Robert M. Montague (1899–1958)	1 January 1957	1 February 1958	~ 1 year, 31 days	U.S. Army
7	Ridgely Gaither	Lieutenant General; Ridgely Gaither (1903–1992)	1 April 1958	1 July 1960	~ 2 years, 91 days	U.S. Army
8	Robert F. Sink	Lieutenant General; Robert F. Sink (1905–1965)	1 July 1960	1 January 1961	~ 184 days	U.S. Army
9	Andrew P. O'Meara	General; Andrew P. O'Meara (1907–2005)	6 January 1961	22 February 1965	4 years, 47 days	U.S. Army
10	Robert W. Porter Jr.	General; Robert W. Porter Jr. (1908–2000)	22 February 1965	18 February 1969	3 years, 362 days	U.S. Army
11	George R. Mather	General; George R. Mather (1911–1993)	18 February 1969	20 September 1971	2 years, 214 days	U.S. Army
12	George V. Underwood Jr.	General; George V. Underwood Jr. (1913–1984)	20 September 1971	17 January 1973	1 year, 119 days	U.S. Army
13	William B. Rosson	General; William B. Rosson (1918–2004)	17 January 1973	1 August 1975	2 years, 196 days	U.S. Army
14	Dennis P. McAuliffe	Lieutenant General; Dennis P. McAuliffe (1922–2012)	1 August 1975	1 October 1979	4 years, 61 days	U.S. Army
15	Wallace H. Nutting	Lieutenant General; Wallace H. Nutting (1928–2023)	1 October 1979	24 May 1983	3 years, 235 days	U.S. Army
16	Paul F. Gorman	General; Paul F. Gorman (1927–2026)	24 May 1983	1 March 1985	1 year, 281 days	U.S. Army
17	John R. Galvin	General; John R. Galvin (1929–2015)	1 March 1985	6 June 1987	2 years, 97 days	U.S. Army
18	Frederick F. Woerner Jr.	General; Frederick F. Woerner Jr. (1933–2023)	6 June 1987	1 October 1989	2 years, 117 days	U.S. Army
19	Maxwell R. Thurman	General; Maxwell R. Thurman (1931–1995)	1 October 1989	21 November 1990	1 year, 51 days	U.S. Army
20	George A. Joulwan	General; George A. Joulwan (born 1939)	21 November 1990	October 1993	~ 2 years, 314 days	U.S. Army
-	Walter T. Worthington	Major General; Walter T. Worthington; Acting	October 1993	17 February 1994	~ 139 days	U.S. Air Force
21	Barry McCaffrey	General; Barry McCaffrey (born 1942)	17 February 1994	1 March 1996	2 years, 13 days	U.S. Army
-	James Perkins	Rear Admiral; James Perkins; Acting	1 March 1996	26 June 1996	117 days	U.S. Navy
22	Wesley Clark	General; Wesley Clark (born 1944)	26 June 1996	13 July 1997	1 year, 17 days	U.S. Army
-	Walter F. Doran	Rear Admiral; Walter F. Doran (born 1945); Acting	13 July 1997	25 September 1997	74 days	U.S. Navy
23	Charles E. Wilhelm	General; Charles E. Wilhelm (born 1941)	25 September 1997	8 September 2000	2 years, 349 days	U.S. Marine Corps
24	Peter Pace	General; Peter Pace (born 1945)	8 September 2000	30 September 2001	1 year, 22 days	U.S. Marine Corps
-	Gary D. Speer	Major General; Gary D. Speer (born 1950); Acting	30 September 2001	18 August 2002	322 days	U.S. Army
25	James T. Hill	General; James T. Hill (born 1946)	18 August 2002	9 November 2004	2 years, 83 days	U.S. Army
26	Bantz J. Craddock	General; Bantz J. Craddock (born 1949)	9 November 2004	19 October 2006	1 year, 344 days	U.S. Army
27	James G. Stavridis	Admiral; James G. Stavridis (born 1955)	19 October 2006	25 June 2009	2 years, 249 days	U.S. Navy
28	Douglas M. Fraser	General; Douglas M. Fraser (born 1953)	25 June 2009	19 November 2012	3 years, 147 days	U.S. Air Force
29	John F. Kelly	General; John F. Kelly (born 1950)	19 November 2012	14 January 2016	3 years, 56 days	U.S. Marine Corps
30	Kurt W. Tidd	Admiral; Kurt W. Tidd (born 1956)	14 January 2016	26 November 2018	2 years, 316 days	U.S. Navy
31	Craig S. Faller	Admiral; Craig S. Faller (born 1961)	26 November 2018	29 October 2021	2 years, 337 days	U.S. Navy
32	Laura J. Richardson	General; Laura J. Richardson (born 1963)	29 October 2021	7 November 2024	3 years, 9 days	U.S. Army
33	Alvin Holsey	Admiral; Alvin Holsey (born 1965)	7 November 2024	12 December 2025	1 year, 35 days	U.S. Navy
-	Evan L. Pettus	Lieutenant General; Evan L. Pettus (born c. 1972); Acting	12 December 2025	5 February 2026	55 days	U.S. Air Force
35	Francis L. Donovan	General; Francis L. Donovan (born c. 1966)	5 February 2026	Incumbent	283 days	U.S. Marine Corps

== See also ==
- Caribbean Regional Maritime Agreement
- Manta Air Base
- Operation Coronet Nighthawk
- Operation Enduring Freedom - Caribbean and Central America
- Partnership for Prosperity and Security in the Caribbean
- Western Hemisphere Institute for Security Cooperation (formerly School of the Americas)
- Naval Base Panama Canal Zone
- Newfoundland Base Command
- Greenland Base Command
- Bermuda Base Command
- Alaska Defense Command
- Antiaircraft Command (United States)
- Northwest Service Command
- Icelandic Base Command
