= United States and the International Criminal Court =

National relationship with the ICC

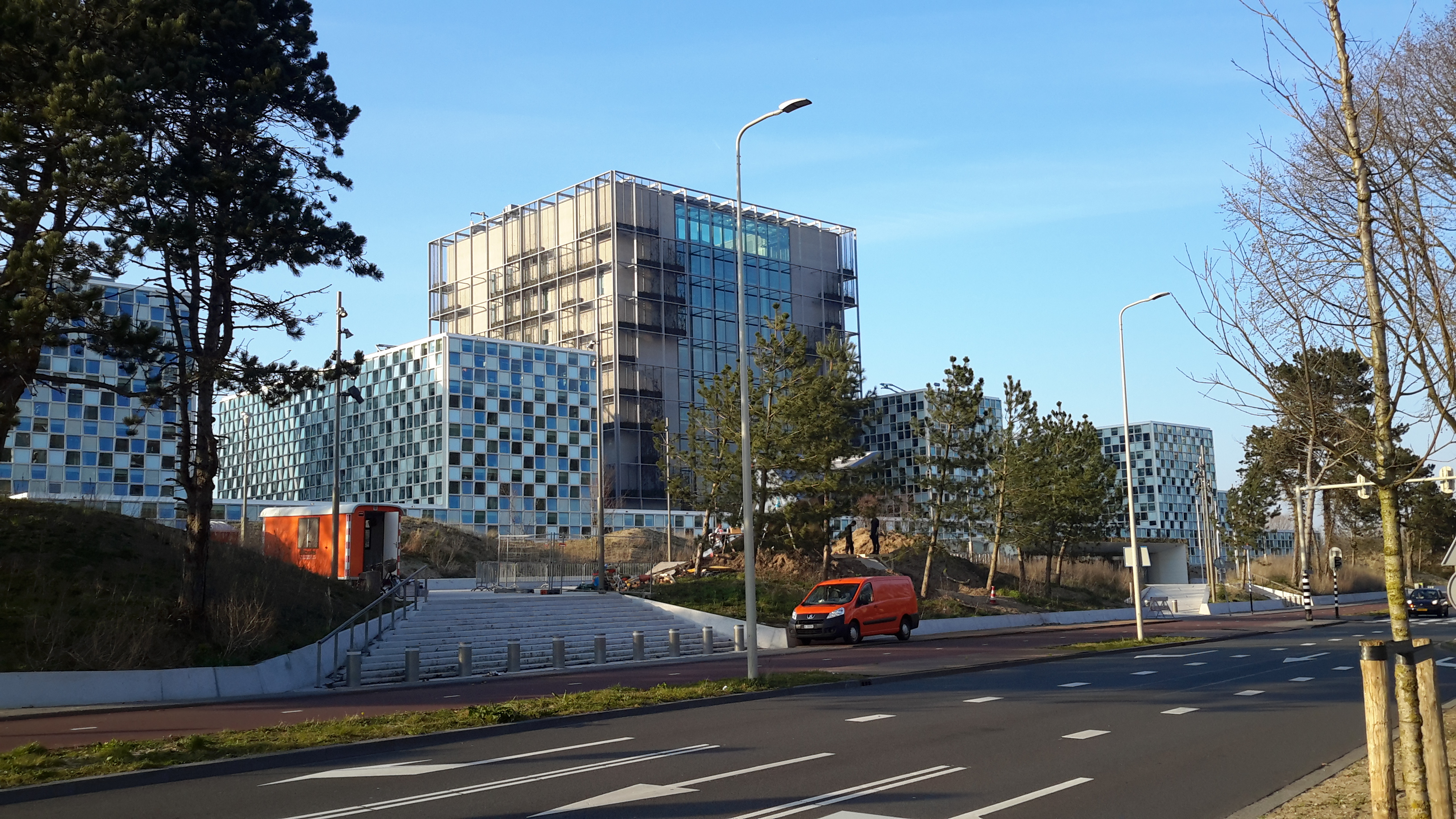
The International Criminal Court in The Hague

The United States is not a state party to the Rome Statute, which founded the International Criminal Court (ICC) in 2002.

As of January 2025, 125 states are members of the Court. Other states that have not become parties to the Rome Statute include India, Indonesia, and China. On May 6, 2002, the United States, having previously signed the Rome Statute, formally withdrew its signature and indicated that it did not intend to ratify the agreement.

United States policy concerning the ICC has varied widely. Critics of the ICC in the United States have expressed concerns that U.S. soldiers will receive unwanted scrutiny by the court. The Clinton administration signed the Rome Statute in 2000, but did not submit it for Senate ratification. The George W. Bush administration, the U.S. administration at the time of the ICC's founding, signed the Hague Invasion Act and stated that it would not join the ICC. The Obama administration subsequently re-established a working relationship with the Court as an observer.

At Congressional level, US Senate unanimously held that "the International Criminal Court (ICC) is an international tribunal that seeks to uphold the rule of law, especially in areas where no rule of law exists, by investigating and trying individuals charged ‘‘with the gravest crimes of concern to the international community: genocide, war crimes, crimes against humanity and the crime of aggression’’".

Under the first and second Trump administrations, U.S. policy toward the ICC escalated to outward hostility marked by punitive measures and sanctions against ICC staff, particularly in response to the ICC arrest warrants for Israeli leaders in 2024.

== Rome Statute ==
Following years of negotiations aimed at establishing a permanent international tribunal to prosecute individuals accused of genocide and other serious international crimes, such as crimes against humanity, war crimes, and the recently defined crimes of aggression, the United Nations General Assembly convened a five-week diplomatic conference in Rome in June 1998 "to finalize and adopt a convention on the establishment of an international criminal court". On July 17, 1998, the Rome Statute was adopted by a vote of 120 to 7, with 21 countries abstaining. The seven countries that voted against the treaty were Iraq, Israel, Libya, China, Qatar, Yemen, and the United States.

U.S. president Bill Clinton originally signed the Rome Statute in 2000. Signature of a treaty provides a preliminary endorsement, but a treaty that is signed but not ratified is not legally binding. Signing does not create a binding legal obligation, but does demonstrate the state's intention to examine the treaty domestically and consider ratifying it, and it obliges the state to refrain from acts that would counter or undermine the treaty's objective and purpose.

Clinton stated that he would not submit it to the Senate for advice and consent for ratification until the U.S. government had a chance to assess the functioning of the Court. He nonetheless supported the proposed role of the ICC and its objectives:

The United States should have the chance to observe and assess the functioning of the court, over time, before choosing to become subject to its jurisdiction. Given these concerns, I will not, and do not recommend that my successor, submit the treaty to the Senate for advice and consent until our fundamental concerns are satisfied. Nonetheless, signature is the right action to take at this point. I believe that a properly constituted and structured International Criminal Court would make a profound contribution in deterring egregious human rights abuses worldwide, and that signature increases the chances for productive discussions with other governments to advance these goals in the months and years ahead.

After the Rome Statute reached the requisite 60 ratifications in 2002, President George W. Bush's administration sent a note to the U.N. secretary-general on May 6, 2002. The note informed the secretary-general that the U.S. no longer intended to ratify the Rome Statute, and that it did not recognize any obligation toward the Rome Statute. In addition, the U.S. stated that its intention not to become a state party should be reflected in the U.N. depository's list. This is because signatories have an obligation not to undermine the object and purpose of a treaty according to Article 18 of the Vienna Convention on the Law of Treaties, also sometimes referred to as the good faith obligations. According to American Non-Governmental Organizations Coalition for the International Criminal Court, the U.S. could engage with the Court by reactivating its signature to the Rome Statute by submitting a letter to the secretary-general.

== Particular U.S. ratification contingencies ==
A treaty becomes part of the municipal law of a nation only when the treaty has been ratified, accepted, or acceded to. In the U.S., the Constitution gives the president power to negotiate treaties under the Treaty Clause of Article Two. The president must then submit a treaty to the Senate for advice and consent for ratification, and the Senate must approve the treaty by a two-thirds majority before it can take effect. The Senate may submit amendments, reservations, or explanations to the president regarding the treaty. Once ratified, treaties are generally self-executing—at least from the perspective of other nations—as the ratifying state fully binds itself to the treaty as a matter of the public international law and of national honor and good faith. In the U.S., however, a treaty does not immediately become effective as U.S. domestic law upon entry into force, which occurs only if the treaty is self-executing. In Foster v. Neilson (1829), the U.S. Supreme Court explained that treaties are self-executing if accompanying legislation is not necessary for implementation. A treaty requiring additional action is not self-executing; it would create an international obligation for the U.S., but would have no effect on domestic law.

However, entrenched provisions of municipal law—such as the constitution of a state party or other fundamental laws—may cause the treaty not to be fully executable in municipal law if it conflicts with those entrenched provisions. Article Six of the U.S. Constitution contains the Supremacy Clause, which gives all treaties ratified in accordance with the Constitution the effect of federal law. In the U.S., if a treaty is found to be self-executing it will preempt inconsistent state law and previous legislation. This issue was addressed by the U.S. Supreme Court in Ware v. Hylton 3 U.S. 199 (1796), where it found that the treaty at issue was self-executing and struck down an inconsistent state law. However, a treaty cannot preempt the Constitution itself as held in Reid v. Covert 354 U.S. 1 (1957). Thus, in order for a treaty to be executable within the United States, it might be necessary for the Constitution to be amended. Otherwise, treaty provisions could potentially be found unconstitutional and consequently be struck down by the courts. An example of an instance where this occurred outside the U.S. is when Ireland ratified the Rome Statute. The Irish government's response was to hold a national referendum on the issue in 2001, after which the government amended their Constitution to bring it into effect. The question of whether the Rome Statute would require amendments to the U.S. Constitution to be brought into effect is a matter of debate within the United States. However, some scholars and experts believe that the Rome Statute is compatible with the U.S. Constitution.

== U.S. criticism and support of the ICC ==
=== Lack of due process ===
The ICC has been criticized for absence of jury trials; allegations of retrials allowed for errors of fact; allegations that hearsay evidence is allowed; and allegations of no right to a speedy trial, a public trial, or reasonable bail. Supporters of the ICC say that the ICC Statute contains the due process rights found in the U.S. Constitution and now well recognized in international standards of due process in Article 67 Rome Statute, with the exception of the right to jury trial.

==== Military justice ====
Former U.S. State Department Legal Advisor Monroe Leigh has said:

The list of due process rights guaranteed by the Rome Statute are, if anything, more detailed and comprehensive than those in the U.S. Bill of Rights. ... I can think of no right guaranteed to military personnel by the U.S. Constitution that is not also guaranteed in the Treaty of Rome.

The U.S. has adopted forms of war crimes and crimes against humanity within its military courts. The military courts have jurisdiction over all military personnel abroad and any accompanying civilians. Further, the U.S. has adopted criminal laws against genocide within its domestic system and conscription of child soldiers.

=== Incompatibility with the U.S. Constitution ===
The Heritage Foundation, a U.S.-based conservative think tank, issued the following:

United States participation in the ICC treaty regime would also be unconstitutional because it would allow the trial of U.S. citizens for crimes committed on U.S. soil, which are otherwise entirely within the judicial power of the United States. The Supreme Court has long held that only the courts of the United States, as established under the Constitution, can try such offenses.

This statement refers to several issues. The first is the trial of U.S. citizens by the ICC and implies that the Court does not have the power to try Americans for crimes committed on U.S. territory. The second refers to due-process issues.

Critics argue that, because the U.S. Constitution permits the creation of only one Supreme Court, participation with the International Criminal Court violates the U.S. Constitution. However, the Court is not a creation of the U.S.; instead, it functions internationally. Further, the U.S. has participated in various international courts including the International Military Tribunal for the Far East, the Nuremberg trials, and the tribunals for the former Yugoslavia and Rwanda.

=== Other views ===
The Heritage Foundation has stated that:

The true measure of America's commitment to peace and justice and its opposition to genocide and war crimes lies not in its participation in international bureaucracies like the ICC, but in its actions. The United States has led the fight to free millions in Afghanistan and Iraq. It is a party to many human rights treaties and, unlike many other nations, abides by those treaty commitments. The U.S. has led the charge to hold violators of human rights to account, including fighting hard for imposing Security Council sanctions on the Sudanese government until it stops supporting the militia groups that are committing genocide in Darfur and helps to restore order to the region. The U.S. polices its military and punishes them when they commit crimes. In every practical way, the U.S. honors the beliefs and purposes underlying the ICC.

In a 2005 poll of 1,182 residents of the United States by the Chicago Council on Global Affairs and the Program on International Policy Attitudes at the University of Maryland, 69% favored U.S. participation in the ICC.

On a candidate questionnaire during the 2004 Senate race, Barack Obama was asked:

Should the United States ratify the 'Rome Statute of the International Criminal Court'? If not, what concerns do you have that need to be resolved before you would support joining the court? Prior to ratification, what should the United States relationship with the Court be, particularly in regards to sharing intelligence, prosecuting war criminals, and referring cases to the U.N. Security Council?

Obama answered: "Yes[.] The United States should cooperate with ICC investigations in a way that reflects U.S. sovereignty and promotes our national security interests."

Senator John McCain said on January 28, 2005: "I want us in the ICC, but I'm not satisfied that there are enough safeguards." He also later stated: "We should publicly remind Khartoum that the International Criminal Court has jurisdiction to prosecute war crimes in Darfur and that Sudanese leaders will be held personally accountable for attacks on civilians."

Senator Hillary Clinton on February 13, 2005:

Fourth, Europe must acknowledge that the United States has global responsibilities that create unique circumstances. For example, we are more vulnerable to the misuse of an international criminal court because of the international role we play and the resentments that flow from that ubiquitous presence around the world. That does not mean, in my opinion, that the United States should walk out of the International Criminal Court. But it does mean we have legitimate concerns that the world should address, and it is fair to ask that there be sensitivity to those concerns that are really focused on the fact that the United States is active on every continent in the world. As we look to the future, there are so many opportunities for us to renew our relationship and we need to because we face so many challenges.

Clinton later added:

Consistent with my overall policy of reintroducing the United States to the world, I will as President evaluate the record of Court, and reassess how we can best engage with this institution and hold the worst abusers of human rights to account.

Representative Ron Paul said on April 8, 2002:

The United Nations and the ICC are inherently incompatible with national sovereignty. The United States must either remain a constitutional republic or submit to international law, because it cannot do both. The Constitution is the supreme law of the land, and the conflict between adhering to the rule of law and obeying globalist planners is now staring us in the face. At present we fortunately have a President who opposes the ICC, but ultimately it is up to Congress – and concerned citizens – to insure that no American ever stands trial before an international court.

Bill Richardson, the Governor of New Mexico, said in 2007 while campaigning for the 2008 Democratic nomination: "We must repair our alliances ... renew our commitment to International Law and multilateral cooperation ... this means joining the International Criminal Court."

Dennis Kucinich, Democratic member of the United States House of Representatives and a presidential candidate in the 2004 and 2008 elections, said on April 26, 2007:

As president of the United States, I intend to take America in a different direction, rejecting war as an instrument of policy, reconnecting with the nations of the world, so that we can address the real issues that affect security all over the globe and affect our security at home: getting rid of all nuclear weapons, the United States participating in the chemical weapons convention, the biological weapons convention, the small arms treaty, the landmine treaty, joining the International Criminal Court, signing the Kyoto climate change treaty.

John Edwards, the former Senator and the Democratic Vice-Presidential candidate in 2004, called for America to be part of the court when campaigning for the 2008 Democratic nomination, saying:

We should be the natural leader in ... these areas ... when America doesn't engage in these international institutions, when we show disrespect for international agreements, it makes it extraordinarily difficult when we need the world community to rally around us ... we didn't used to be the country of Guantanamo and Abu Ghraib. We were the great light for the rest of the world, and America needs to be that light again.

Benjamin B. Ferencz, an investigator of Nazi war crimes after World War II and the Chief Prosecutor for the United States Army at the Einsatzgruppen trial, one of the twelve "subsequent Nuremberg trials" held by the U.S. authorities, later became a vocal advocate of the establishment of an international rule of law and of an International Criminal Court. In his first book, published in 1975 and entitled Defining International Aggression-The Search for World Peace, he argued for the establishment of an international court.

== Presidential positions ==
=== George W. Bush ===
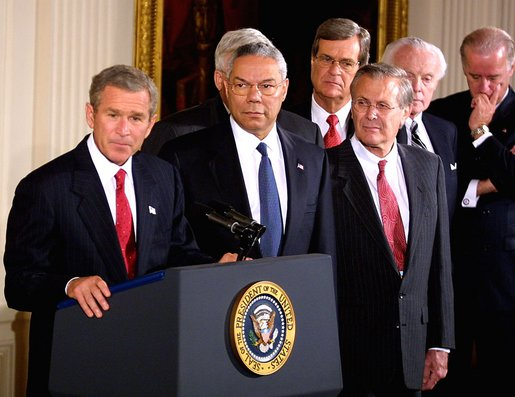
U.S. president George W. Bush (left)

The position of the Bush administration during its first term in office was to unalterably oppose U.S. ratification of the Rome Statute, believing Americans would be unfairly treated for political reasons. Moreover, the Bush administration actively pursued a policy of hostility towards the Court in its international relations, exceeding merely staying out of the statute, instead following the provisions of the American Service-Members' Protection Act, in seeking to guarantee that U.S. citizens be immune to the court and to thwart other states from acceding to the statute without taking U.S. concerns into account. The U.S. vigorously pressed states to conclude "Article 98 agreements," bilateral immunity agreements (BIAs) with the U.S. that would guarantee its citizens immunity from the court's jurisdiction, threatening to cut off aid to states that refused to agree.

However, Bush administration officials tempered their opposition to the ICC in the administration's second term, especially after the departure of John Bolton from the Bush administration. The United States did not oppose using the ICC to prosecute atrocities in Darfur, Sudan, as evidenced by the U.S. abstention on United Nations Security Council Resolution 1593 referring the Darfur situation to the ICC for prosecution. In a statement, the State Department's Legal Adviser John Bellinger stated: "At least as a matter of policy, not only do we not oppose the ICC's investigation and prosecutions in Sudan but we support its investigation and prosecution of those atrocities." In addition, the U.S. House of Representatives, in a resolution, acknowledged the ICC's authority to prosecute war crimes in Darfur.

=== Barack Obama ===
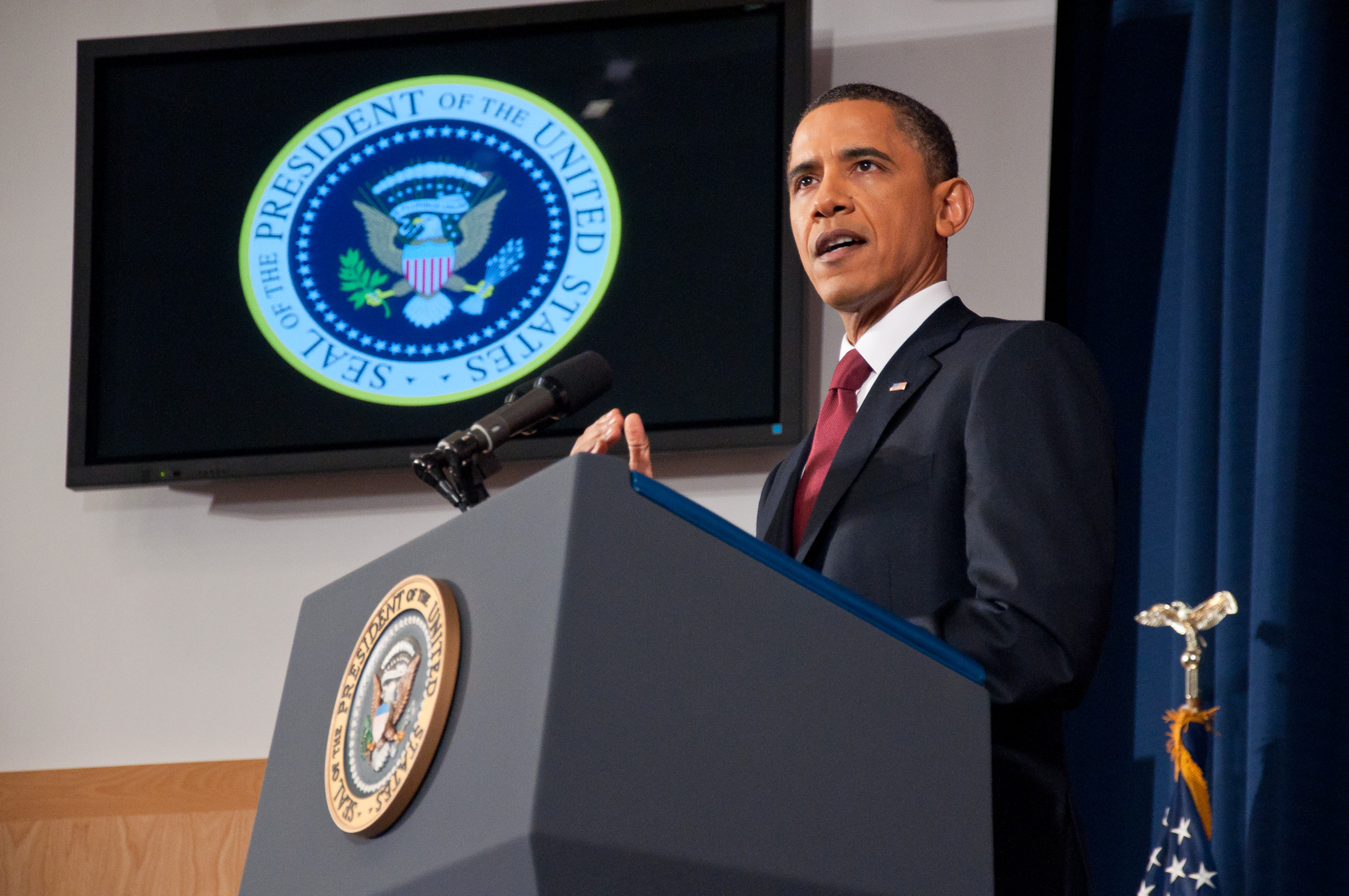
US president Barack Obama

The Obama administration stated its intent to cooperate with the ICC. Cooperation with the Assembly of States Parties of the ICC was a key component of the Obama administration's first National Security Strategy. On November 16, 2009, the Ambassador-at-Large for War Crimes Issues, Stephen Rapp, announced that he would lead the U.S. delegation to the ICC's annual meeting of the Assembly of States Parties in The Hague. He told journalists "Our government has now made the decision that Americans will return to engagement at the ICC." The U.S. participated as an observer. This was the first time the U.S. had a delegation attend the ICC's annual meeting of the Assembly.

In response to a question from the Senate Foreign Relations Committee, Secretary of State Hillary Clinton remarked that the U.S. will end its "hostility" towards the court. In addition, Susan Rice, U.S. Ambassador to the United Nations, in her first address to the Security Council expressed U.S. support for the court's investigation in Sudan. These statements coupled with the removal of sanctions to the BIAs signaled a positive shift in the U.S. cooperation with the Court. The Obama administration made no formal policy decision on the ICC or the status of the BIAs, and did not state an intention to rejoin the Rome Statute or submit the treaty to Senate ratification.

The administration sent a large delegation to the Review Conference of the Rome Statute in Kampala, Uganda in May and June 2010. The outcome from Kampala included a successful assessment of the Rome Statute system of international justice, the announcement of numerous formal pledges by countries to assist the court, and the adoption of amendments on war crimes and the crime of aggression. The U.S. co-sponsored a side event with Norway and the Democratic Republic of the Congo (DRC) on building the capacity of the DRC's judicial system to address atrocity crimes.

The U.S. announced two pledges at Kampala, and was the only non-State Party to make a pledge. The U.S. formally committed to building the legal capacity of certain countries to prosecute atrocity crimes themselves, and to assisting the ICC in its investigation and prosecution of the leaders of the Lord's Resistance Army, a rebel group originating from Uganda and led by Joseph Kony.

The Conference adopted two sets of amendments. The administration believes that the outcome on both is in accord with important U.S. interests. The Conference adopted a definition for the crime of aggression, the conditions under which it would exercise jurisdiction, and a roadmap for the eventual activation of jurisdiction after January 1, 2017. The U.S. initially raised concerns about the definition, but accepted it after other countries agreed to attach a set of detailed understandings to the resolution adopting the amendments. Under the amendment, the ICC will be, first, unable to prosecute individuals of a non-state party, and second, state-parties will have the opportunity to opt out of aggression jurisdiction if they so wish.

Speaking about the past and future of U.S.–ICC relations in light of the Review Conference, Harold Koh, Legal Adviser of the State Department, declared in 2010:

After 12 years, I think we have reset the default on the U.S. relationship with the Court from hostility to positive engagement. In this case, principled engagement worked to protect our interest, to improve the outcome, and to bring us renewed international goodwill.

=== First presidency of Donald Trump ===
In September 2018, President Donald Trump criticized the Court before the United Nations. In his speech condemning globalism and the over reach of international agencies, he drew parallels between the court and the United Nations Human Rights Council.

So the United States took the only responsible course: We withdrew from the Human Rights Council, and we will not return until real reform is enacted. For similar reasons, the United States will provide no support in recognition to the International Criminal Court. As far as America is concerned, the ICC has no jurisdiction, no legitimacy, and no authority. The ICC claims near-universal jurisdiction over the citizens of every country, violating all principles of justice, fairness, and due process. We will never surrender America's sovereignty to an unelected, unaccountable, global bureaucracy.

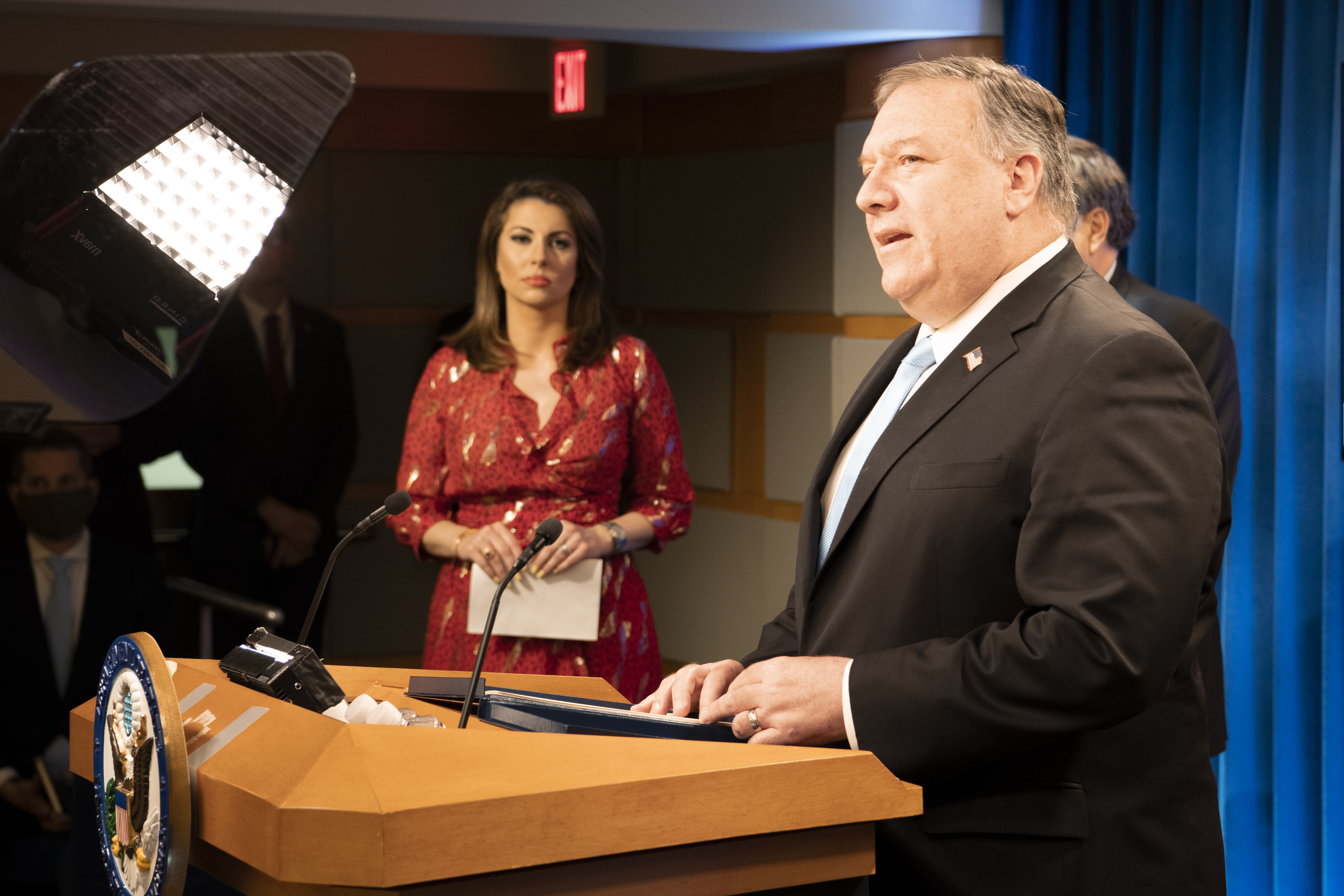
Secretary of state Mike Pompeo holds a news conference on sanctions imposed on the International Criminal Court, June 11, 2020.

In April 2019, the United States revoked the visa of the Prosecutor of the International Criminal Court, Fatou Bensouda, in anticipation of a later investigation into possible war crimes committed by U.S. forces during the War in Afghanistan; the investigation was authorized in March 2020. In June 2020, Donald Trump signed Executive Order 13928 sanctioning ICC staff in retaliation for the aforementioned case. His secretary of state Mike Pompeo called it a "kangaroo court".

=== Joe Biden ===
On April 2, 2021, President Joe Biden lifted the Trump-era sanctions against Bensouda and Phakiso Mochochoko, head of the ICC's Jurisdiction, Complementarity and Cooperation Division. Secretary of State Antony Blinken issued a statement maintaining the country's "longstanding objection to the Court's efforts to assert jurisdiction over personnel of non-States Parties such as the United States and Israel"; however, he added that "our concerns about these cases would be better addressed through engagement with all stakeholders in the ICC process rather than through the imposition of sanctions".

Although not a member, Biden has welcomed the ICC's decision for the arrest warrant of the president of Russia Vladimir Putin and the Russian Commissioner for Children's Rights Maria Lvova-Belova on March 18, 2023, during the Russian invasion of Ukraine after it was discovered that Russia had deported children from Ukraine.

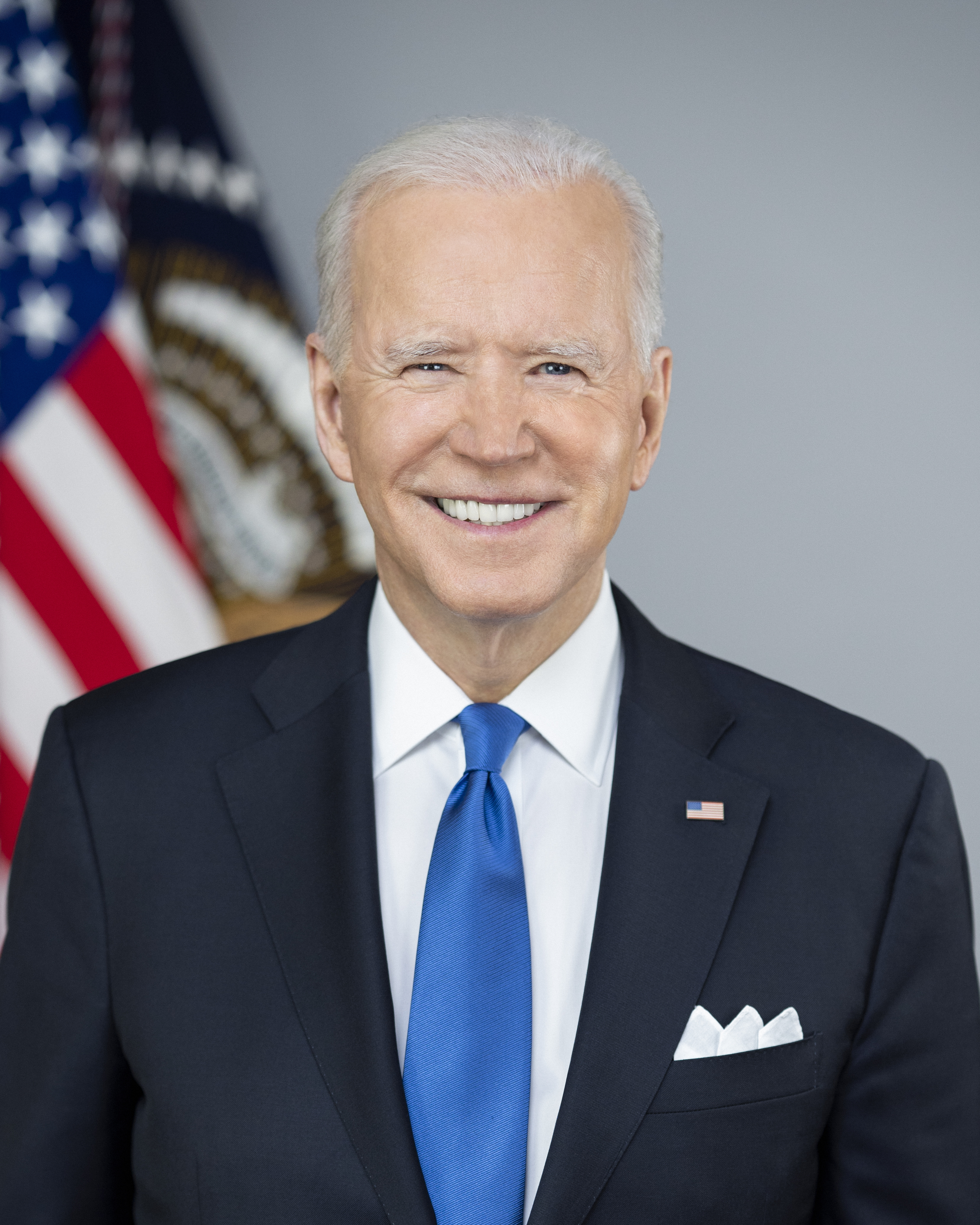
US president Joe Biden

When the ICC began considering arrest warrants for Israeli prime minister Benjamin Netanyahu and Defense Minister Yoav Gallant over Israeli war crimes committed during the Gaza war, Biden was opposed, denouncing the chief investigator's request for arrest warrants as "outrageous", pledging "ironclad" support for Israel. Secretary of State Antony Blinken said the Biden administration would work with the US Congress on potential sanctions against the ICC. On June 4, 2024, the U.S. House of Representatives passed a bill to sanction the ICC prosecutor; in September, U.N. Ambassador Linda Thomas-Greenfield stated the U.S. would not comply with any ICC arrest warrant for Netanyahu.

After the ICC formally issued arrest warrants for Netanyahu and Galant in November of that year, the White House said the United States "fundamentally rejects" the ICC's decision, adding that "the ICC does not have jurisdiction over this matter". Biden called the arrest warrant for Netanyahu "outrageous". Senator Lindsey Graham (R-SC) called the ICC a "dangerous joke" and for sanctions on the ICC in a bill already proposed. Similarly, Senator Chuck Schumer (D-NY) said that Congress "needs to pass the bipartisan legislation that came from the House sanctioning the Court for such an outrage and President Biden needs to sign it." Representative Mike Waltz (R-FL) added that "The ICC has no credibility and these allegations have been refuted by the US government." Senator Tom Cotton (R-AR) called for military force, according to the domestic law The Hague Invasion Act, to use "all means necessary and appropriate." Senator John Fetterman (D-PA) wrote on social media that the ICC has: "No standing, relevance, or path. Fuck that." His colleagues, Representative Jared Moskowitz (D-FL) accused the ICC of having an "antisemitic double standard," Senator Jacky Rosen (D-NV) called on Biden to "use his authority to swiftly respond to this overreach" and Representative Ritchie Torres (D-NY) accused the ICC of "criminalizing self-defence."

On the other hand, Representative Rashida Tlaib (D-MI) said: "The International Criminal Court's long overdue decision to issue arrest warrants for Netanyahu and Gallant for war crimes and crimes against humanity signals that the days of the Israeli apartheid government operating with impunity are ending." Senator Bernie Sanders (I-VT) expressed his support for the warrants, describing the ICC's charges as well-founded and warning that "If the world does not uphold international law, we will descend into further barbarism."

On January 9, 2025, the U.S. House of Representatives passed the Illegitimate Court Counteraction Act by 243–140 to sanction the ICC in protest at its arrest warrants for Netanyahu and Galant issued in November 2024.

=== Second presidency of Donald Trump ===
On February 6, 2025, President Donald Trump issued an executive order imposing sanctions on the ICC.

"The ICC has, without a legitimate basis, asserted jurisdiction over and opened preliminary investigations concerning personnel of the United States and certain of its allies, including Israel, and has further abused its power by issuing baseless arrest warrants targeting Israeli Prime Minister Benjamin Netanyahu and Former Minister of Defense Yoav Gallant. The ICC has no jurisdiction over the United States or Israel, as neither country is party to the Rome Statute or a member of the ICC. Neither country has ever recognized the ICC's jurisdiction, and both nations are thriving democracies with militaries that strictly adhere to the laws of war."

— Donald Trump, Executive Order "Imposing Sanctions on the International Criminal Court"

On August 20, 2025, the United States Department of State imposed sanctions on International Criminal Court judges Nicolas Guillou and Kimberly Prost and deputy prosecutors Nazhat Shameem and Maye Mandiaye Niang over their involvement in cases concerning Israel and the United States.

In early 2025, Microsoft cancelled the email address of Prosecutor of the ICC Karim Khan. The Associated Press interpreted the cancellation to be a result of the sanctions. Microsoft stated that the Microsoft email accounts of four ICC judges sanctioned in June were not suspended. Khan and some other ICC staff switched their email addresses to Proton Mail. In June, a Microsoft spokesperson confirmed the disconnection of Khan's account. The spokesperson stated that Microsoft had not "cease[d] or suspend[ed] its services to the ICC". In late October 2025, the ICC stated that it would switch from Microsoft Office to the free and open-source productivity software suite OpenDesk; Euractiv interpreted this as a response to the sanctions.

On July 13, 2026, Secretary of State Rubio, in an op-ed for The Wall Street Journal, announced that the administration began a diplomatic push to "dismantle" the court. In the leadup to the general debate of the 2026–2027 session of the United Nations General Assembly, New York City Mayor Zohran Mamdani encouraged an arrest of Netanyahu for his ICC warrant at the UN Headquarters.

On 9 October 2026, the United States imposed new sanctions on the ICC. The sanctions bar the ICC from U.S. financial services, technology companies and transactions in U.S. dollars, and require U.S. businesses and individuals to wind down their businesses with the ICC in six months.

== American policies towards the ICC ==
The United States and many advocates for the ICC have long been at odds over the Court's statute, accountability, and jurisdiction. Although these differences have not been resolved, two actions have refocused international and domestic attention on America's policy toward the ICC. The first was enactment of the "Nethercutt Amendment", which extended prohibitions on assistance to ICC parties beyond those already in place under the American Service-Members' Protection Act (ASPA). The second is the debate over whether or not the U.N. Security Council should refer the genocide in Sudan to the ICC for investigation.

=== American Service-Members' Protection Act ===
In 2002, the U.S. Congress passed the American Service-Members' Protection Act (ASPA), which contained a number of provisions, including authorization of the president to "use all means necessary and appropriate to bring about the release of any U.S. or allied personnel being detained by, on behalf of, or at the request of the International Criminal Court", and also prohibitions on the United States providing military aid to countries which had ratified the treaty establishing the court. However, there were a number of exceptions to this, including NATO members, major non-NATO allies, and countries which entered into a BIA with the United States not to hand over U.S. nationals to the Court, as well as any military aid that the U.S. president certified to be in the U.S. national interest.

In addition, ASPA contained provisions prohibiting U.S. co-operation with the Court, and permitting the president to authorize military force to free any U.S. military personnel held by the court, leading opponents to dub it "The Hague Invasion Act". The act was later modified to permit U.S. cooperation with the ICC when dealing with U.S. enemies. The act was a measure created to protect Americans from ICC jurisdiction or prosecution.

On October 2, 2006, President Bush issued waivers of the International Military Education and Training (IMET) prohibitions with respect to 21 nations. Foreign Military Financing (FMF) restricted under ASPA were not affected by the 2006 waivers or the ASPA amendment. On October 17, 2006, Bush signed into law an amendment to ASPA as part of the John Warner National Defense Authorization Act for Fiscal Year 2007 removing IMET restrictions for all nations. On November 22, 2006, Bush issued ASPA waivers with respect to the Comoros and Saint Kitts and Nevis, followed by a similar waiver with respect to Montenegro on August 31, 2007.

On January 28, 2008, Bush signed into law an amendment to the ASPA to eliminate restrictions on FMF to nations unwilling to enter into BIAs shielding U.S. nationals from the jurisdiction of the ICC. Section 1212 of HR 4986 effectively gutted from ASPA all of the provisions which threaten nations with the loss of military assistance of any kind for refusing a BIA.

==== Criticism of ASPA ====
The effects of the ASPA were severely criticized by the Defense Department. While speaking before the U.S. House Committee on Armed Services regarding the FY 2006 Budget, U.S. Army General Bantz J. Craddock, Commander of the U.S. Southern Command, made strong statements on the impact of ASPA on military operations and cooperation in Latin America. He explained that the ASPA was creating a void of contact that is being filled by other extra-hemispheric actors, including China. Vice Admiral Lowell Jacoby made similar statements during a hearing of the Senate Armed Services Committee. In addition, the Chairman of the Joint Chiefs of Staff, Air Force General Richard Myers, testified at the Senate Appropriations Defense Subcommittee on April 27, 2005, that the ASPA has reduced foreign troop training opportunities and hurt the government's ability to fight terrorism abroad as an "unintended consequence".

=== The Nethercutt Amendment ===
Former Representative George Nethercutt's "Nethercutt Amendment" to the Foreign Operations, Export Financing, and Related Programs Appropriations Act suspends Economic Support Fund assistance to ICC States Parties who refused BIAs with the U.S. or were not provided a presidential waiver. The funds affected support initiatives including peacekeeping, anti-terrorism measures, democracy-building, and drug interdiction. The language of the amendment allowed presidential exemptions for NATO, MNNA (major non-NATO allies), and countries eligible for funding from the Millennium Challenge Corporation.

The Nethercutt Amendment differed from former anti-ICC provisions of the ASPA by imposing economic aid cuts instead of military aid cuts. Cutting economic assistance is a far more damaging act because, in many countries, it intended to bolster local economies instead of national defense. In addition, existing status of forces agreements (SOFAs) and other bilateral agreements already provide full U.S. jurisdiction over U.S. personnel and officials serving abroad.

The appropriations bill containing the controversial amendments were adopted for FY 2005, FY 2006, and FY 2008. Congress did not pass a foreign operations appropriations bill or any other bill containing the Nethercutt provision for FY 2007. On December 17, 2007, the U.S. Congress approved HR 2764, a comprehensive Consolidated Appropriations Act which reinstates the so-called Nethercutt provision cutting off Economic Support Funds (ESF) to nations unwilling to enter into BIAs or so-called Article 98 Agreements shielding U.S. nationals from the jurisdiction of the ICC.

President Bush signed the bill into law on December 26, 2007, and it became Public Law 110–161. However, by mid-2009, Congress had removed all the IMET restrictions and failed to renew the Nethercutt Amendment.

=== Bilateral Immunity Agreements (BIAs) ===
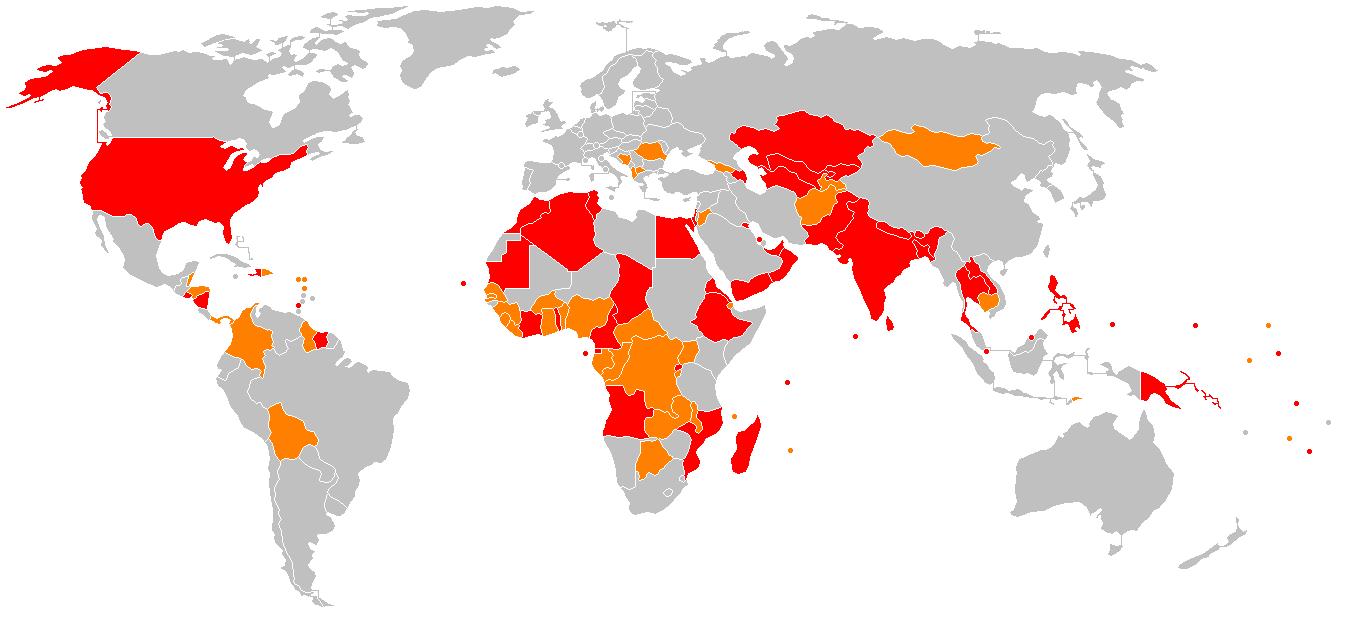
Map of countries which have signed Article 98 agreements with the United States. Orange states are members of the ICC. Red states are non-members.

The states parties to the Rome Statute: Parties Parties for which it has not entered into force States that were parties to the Statute but withdrew Signed but not ratified Signed but subsequently withdrew its signature Neither signed nor acceded

Article 98 of the Rome Statute prohibits the ICC from requesting assistance or the surrender of a person to the ICC if to do so would require the state to "act inconsistently" with its obligations under international law or international agreements unless the state or the third-party state waives the immunity or grants cooperation. The U.S. has interpreted this article to mean that its citizens cannot be transferred to the ICC by any state that has signed a bilateral agreement with the U.S. prohibiting such a transfer, even if the state is a member of the Rome Statute. The U.S. actively pressured states to conclude such so-called Article 98 agreements, otherwise known as bilateral immunity agreements (BIAs). The Bush administration claimed that the BIAs were drafted out of concern that existing agreements—particularly the status of forces agreements or status of mission agreements (SOFAs or SOMAs)—did not sufficiently protect Americans from the jurisdiction of the ICC.

Until 2008, the ASPA and the Nethercutt Amendment required the cessation of ESF to those states which had ratified the Rome Statute unless they signed a BIA (though they could be exempted from this if they were a member of NATO or a major non-NATO ally). ESF entails a wide range of governance programs including international counter-terrorism efforts, peace process programs, anti-drug trafficking initiatives, truth and reconciliation commissions, wheelchair distribution, and HIV/AIDS education, among others. In March 2006, Condoleezza Rice said that blocking military aid to those seeking to fight terrorism is "sort of the same as shooting ourselves in the foot".

Mali, Namibia, South Africa, Tanzania, and Kenya publicly rejected signing BIAs in 2003, and subsequently saw their development aid funding cut by more than 89 million dollars. According to the Coalition for the International Criminal Court, as of 2006, 52 countries had "rejected U.S. efforts to sign bilateral immunity agreements (BIAs), despite unrelenting U.S. pressure and the threat and actual loss of military assistance". By Spring 2006, such agreements had been accepted by approximately one hundred governments and were under consideration by approximately eighteen more.

By 2009, with Obama in office, the laws cutting aid unless BIAs were no longer in place; the Nethercutt Amendment had not been renewed, and the restrictions mandated in the ASPA had already been repealed under Bush. As of that year, 102 BIAs had been signed, though it was not clear how many were legally binding, and the U.S. had ceased pursuing more agreements.

Romania was one of the first countries to sign an Article 98 agreement with the United States. In response to Romania's action, the European Union requested that candidate countries not sign Article 98 agreements with the United States until the EU ministers had met to agree upon a common position. In September 2002, the Council of the European Union adopted a common position, permitting member states to enter into Article 98 agreements with the United States, but only concerning U.S. military personnel, U.S. diplomatic or consular officials, and persons extradited, sent to their territories by the United States with their permission; not the general protection of U.S. nationals that the United States sought. Furthermore, the common position provided that any person protected from ICC prosecution by such agreements would have to be prosecuted by the United States. This was in agreement with the original position of the EU, that Article 98 agreements were allowed to cover these restricted classes of persons but could not cover all the citizens of a state.

=== United Nations Security Council Resolutions ===
In July 2002, the United States threatened to use its Security Council veto to block renewal of the mandates of several U.N. peacekeeping operations, unless the Security Council agreed to permanently exempt U.S. nationals from the Court's jurisdiction. The secretary-general of the United Nations, Kofi Annan, said that the U.S. proposal "flies in the face of treaty law", risks undermining the Rome Statute, and could end up discrediting the Security Council.

Initially, the United States sought to prevent prosecution of personnel on U.N. missions by any country except that of their nationality. The Security Council rejected that approach, and the United States made use of a provision of the Rome Statute that allowed the Security Council to direct the ICC not exercise its jurisdiction over a certain matter for up to one year. The United States sought the Security Council to convey such a request to the ICC concerning U.S. personnel on United Nations peacekeeping and enforcement operations. Further, the U.S. sought to have that request renewed automatically each year. (If renewed automatically each year, then another Security Council resolution would be required to cease the request, which the United States could then veto, which would effectively make the request permanent.) ICC supporters argued that the Rome Statute requires that, for the request to be valid, it must be voted upon each year in the Security Council. Therefore, an automatically renewing request would violate the Statute. By international law, questions regarding the interpretation of the U.N. Charter may only be interpreted by the U.N. Security Council. The U.N. Charter requires that all U.N. members abide by the decisions of the Security Council, so only ICC members who are not also U.N. members are not bound.

Other members of the Security Council opposed this request; however, they were increasingly concerned about the future of peacekeeping operations. The United Kingdom eventually negotiated a compromise, whereby the United States would be granted its request, but only for a period of one year. A new Security Council vote would be required in July each year for the exclusion of peacekeepers from ICC jurisdiction to be continued. All members of the Security Council eventually endorsed United Nations Security Council Resolution 1422.

NGO supporters of the ICC, along with several countries not on the Security Council (including Canada and New Zealand), protested the legality of the resolution. The resolution was made under Chapter VII of the U.N. Charter, which requires a "threat to international peace or security" for the Security Council to act; ICC supporters have argued that a U.S. threat to veto peacekeeping operations does not constitute a threat to international peace or security. In such a case, the U.N. Charter states that the Security Council will determine if the Security Council's actions conformed with the U.N. Charter.

A resolution to exempt citizens of the United States from jurisdiction of the ICC was renewed in 2003 by United Nations Security Council Resolution 1487. However, the Security Council refused to renew the exemption again in 2004 after pictures emerged of U.S. troops torturing and abusing Iraqi prisoners in Abu Ghraib, and the U.S. withdrew its demand.

== See also ==
- Command responsibility
- Criticism of United States foreign policy
- History of the foreign policy of the United States
- Human rights in the United States
- International Criminal Court and the 2003 invasion of Iraq
- International organization membership of the United States
- List of assassinations by the United States
- List of war crimes
- Nuremberg principles
- United States and state terrorism
- United States and state-sponsored terrorism
- United States and the League of Nations – Another European-based international organization the United States refused to join in the 20th century
- United States involvement in regime change
- United States non-interventionism
- United States war crimes
