= International Criminal Court and the 2003 invasion of Iraq =

A preliminary examination of possible war crimes committed by United Kingdom (UK) military forces during the invasion of Iraq in March 2003 was started by the ICC in 2005 and closed in 2006. The preliminary examination was reopened in 2014 in the light of new evidence.

== 2005–2006 preliminary examination ==
The Prosecutor of the International Criminal Court (ICC) reported in February 2006 that he had received 240 communications in connection with the invasion of Iraq in March 2003 which alleged that various war crimes had been committed. The overwhelming majority of these communications came from individuals and groups within the United States and the United Kingdom. Many of these complaints concerned the British participation in the invasion, as well as the alleged responsibility for torture deaths while in detention in British-controlled areas.

On February 9, 2006, the Prosecutor, Luis Moreno-Ocampo, published a letter that he had sent to all those who had communicated with him concerning the above, which set out his conclusions on these matters, following a preliminary investigation of the complaints. He explained that two sets of complaints were involved:

(1) Complaints concerning the legality of the invasion itself; and

(2) Complaints concerning the conduct of hostilities between March and May 2003, which included allegations in respect of (a) the targeting of civilians or clearly excessive attacks; and (b) willful killing or inhumane treatment of civilians.

Australia, Poland and the UK are all state parties to the Rome Statute which established the International Criminal Court. Therefore their nationals are liable to prosecution by the court for the violation of any relevant international criminal laws. Because the United States is not a state party, Americans cannot be prosecuted by the court, except for crimes that take place in the territory of a state that has accepted the court's jurisdiction, or situations that are referred to the court by the United Nations Security Council, where the US has a veto.

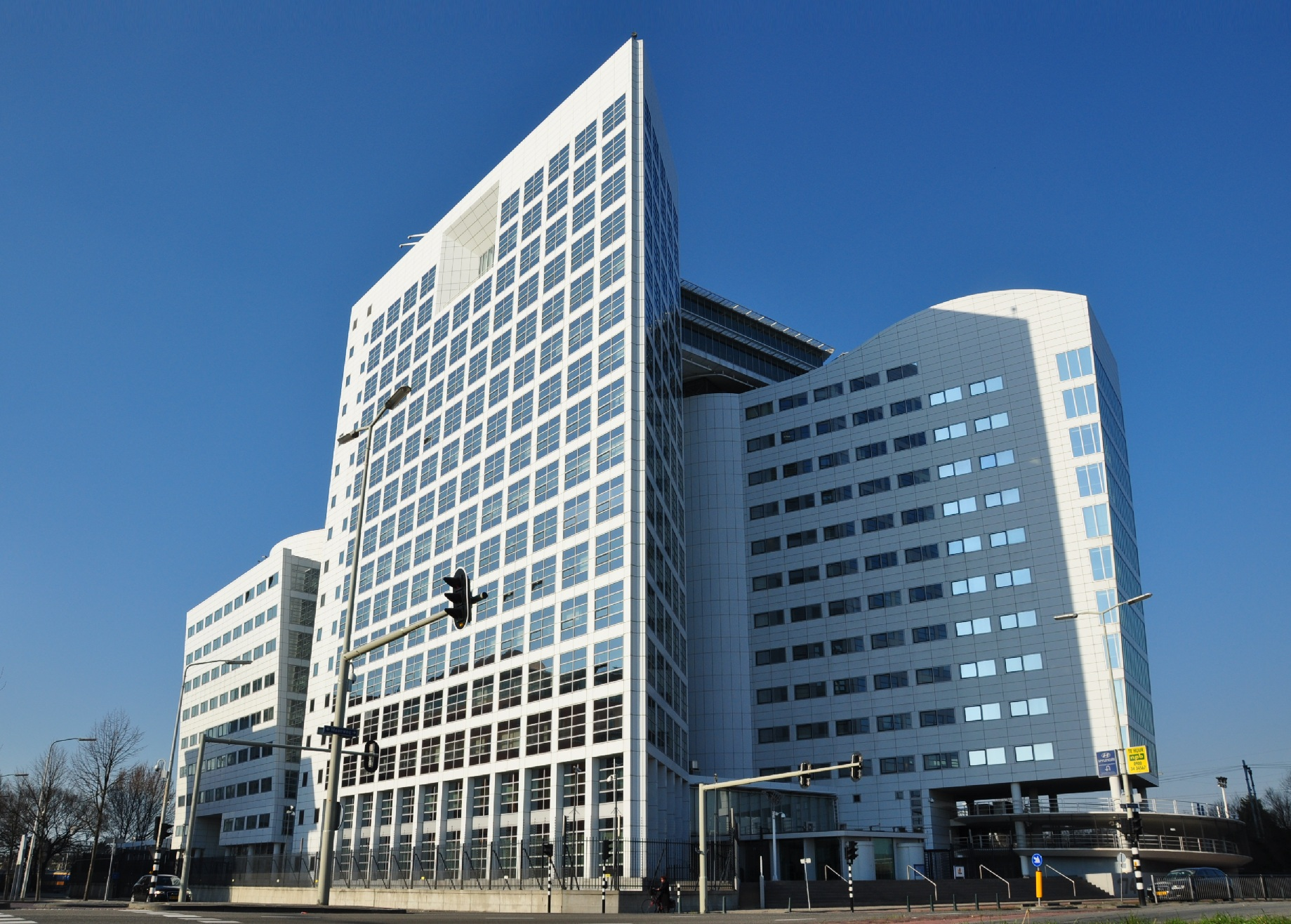
The provisional headquarters of the ICC in use in the early 2000s in The Hague

=== Allegations concerning the legality of the conflict ===
The prosecutor explained that, although the Statute of the International Criminal Court "includes the crime of aggression, it indicates that the Court may not exercise jurisdiction over the crime until a provision has been adopted which defines the crime and sets out the conditions under which the Court may exercise jurisdiction with respect to it (Article 5(2))." Hence:

the International Criminal Court has a mandate to examine the conduct during the conflict, but not whether the decision to engage in armed conflict was legal. As the Prosecutor of the International Criminal Court, I do not have the mandate to address the arguments on the legality of the use of force or the crime of aggression.

The states parties to the ICC adopted such a definition at a review conference in 2010, but the court is only able to exercise jurisdiction over acts of aggression committed after this amendment enters into force.

=== Allegations of war crimes ===
==== Targeting of civilians or clearly excessive attacks ====
In regards to the targeting of civilians or a possible excess of violence, Moreno-Ocampo stated that "The available information established that a considerable number of civilians died or were injured during the military operations"; footnote 12 gives a range of approximately 3,750 to more than 6,900. However, he concluded: "The available information did not indicate intentional attacks on a civilian population."

Moreno-Ocampo also considered in this context whether there were incidents where, even though civilians were not intentionally targeted, the attack was nonetheless clearly excessive to military necessity. For this, he bore in mind (a) the anticipated civilian damage or injury; (b) the anticipated military advantage; and (c) whether the former was "clearly excessive" in relation to the latter. He concluded that, while many facts remain to be determined, the available evidence "did not allow for the conclusion that there was a reasonable basis to believe that a clearly excessive attack within the jurisdiction of the Court had been committed."

As a result, "After exhausting all measures appropriate during the analysis phase, the Office determined that, while many facts remained undetermined, the available information did not provide a reasonable basis to believe that a crime within the jurisdiction of the Court had been committed."

==== Willful killing or inhuman treatment of civilians ====
As far as the allegations of willful killing or inhuman treatment of civilians are concerned, Moreno-Ocampo concluded that there was a reasonable basis to believe that crimes within the jurisdiction of the Court had been committed. He explained that the information available did support a reasonable basis for an estimated four to twelve victims of willful killing and a limited number of victims of inhuman treatment, totaling in all less than twenty persons. He also reported that, in all of these cases, the national authorities had initiated proceedings.

Moreno-Ocampo went on to explain that this on its own is not sufficient for the initiation of an investigation by the International Criminal Court since the Statute requires consideration of admissibility before the Court, in light of the gravity of the crimes. In examining this criterion, he explained:

For war crimes, a specific gravity threshold is set down in Article 8(1), which states that "the Court shall have jurisdiction in respect of war crimes in particular when committed as part of a plan or policy or as part of a large-scale commission of such crimes". This threshold is not an element of the crime, and the words "in particular" suggest that this is not a strict requirement. It does, however, provide Statute guidance that the Court is intended to focus on situations meeting these requirements. According to the available information, it did not appear that any of the criteria of Article 8(1) were satisfied. Even if one were to assume that Article 8(1) had been satisfied, it would then be necessary to consider the general gravity requirement under Article 53(1)(b). The Office considers various factors in assessing gravity. A key consideration is the number of victims of particularly serious crimes, such as wilful killing or rape. The number of potential victims of crimes within the jurisdiction of the Court in this situation – 4 to 12 victims of willful killing and a limited number of victims of inhuman treatment – was of a different order than the number of victims found in other situations under investigation or analysis by the Office. It is worth bearing in mind that the OTP is currently investigating three situations involving long-running conflicts in Northern Uganda, the Democratic Republic of Congo and Darfur. Each of the three situations under investigation involves thousands of wilful killings as well as intentional and large-scale sexual violence and abductions. Collectively, they have resulted in the displacement of more than 5 million people. Other situations under analysis also feature hundreds or thousands of such crimes. Taking into account all the considerations, the situation did not appear to meet the required threshold of the Statute. In light of the conclusion reached on gravity, it was unnecessary to reach a conclusion on complementarity. It may be observed, however, that the Office also collected information on national proceedings, including commentaries from various sources, and that national proceedings had been initiated with respect to each of the relevant incidents.

Moreno-Ocampo qualified this statement by noting that "this conclusion can be reconsidered in the light of new facts or evidence."

==== Allegations of complicity ====
The prosecutor's investigations were principally concerned with the actions of nationals of parties to the statute. However, some of the communications complained that nationals of state parties (most notably the United Kingdom) may have been accessories to crimes committed by nationals of non-States Parties (i.e., the United States). Under the ICC statute, this is a "war crime" founded on accessorial liability (aiding, abetting et cetera), and in the International Criminal Tribunal for the Former Yugoslavia (which follows similar laws) many defendants were accused of involvement in "joint criminal enterprises".

In footnote 10 of his letter, the Prosecutor said: "the available information provided a reasonable basis with respect to a limited number of incidents of war crimes by nationals of States Parties, but not with respect to any particular incidents of indirect participation in war crimes". In other words, he did not find a reasonable basis to proceed against nationals of state parties on the basis of complicity in war crimes carried out by non state parties. However, this is not, as such, a finding that war crimes were not carried out by non state parties. The prosecutor did not express a conclusion on that matter since that was not within his competence.

The statement by the prosecutor did not appear to address any accusations of war crimes or complicity by citizens of State Parties during the subsequent occupation and rule by the Coalition Provisional Authority or after the official handover of Iraqi sovereignty. For example, no mention was made of any involvement by citizens of State Parties (e.g., the Scottish Black Watch regiment) in the US attack on Fallujah in 2003, which resulted in accusations of war crimes — though mainly by US and Iraqi government troops and Iraqi insurgents (who are not under ICC jurisdiction), rather than British forces.

== 2014 reopened examination ==
ICC Prosecutor Fatou Bensouda reopened the preliminary examination in 2014, with the aim of taking into account questions of jurisdiction, admissibility and "the interests of justice" in order to decide whether or not to open an investigation in relation to war crimes alleged to have been committed by UK forces in Iraq. New evidence justifying the reopening of the preliminary examination was provided by the European Center for Constitutional and Human Rights and Public Interest Lawyers.

One of the grounds for opening an ICC investigation was the argument that British authorities did not properly investigate the war crimes allegations. The ICC studied the question of whether British authorities "engaged in shielding perpetrators from criminal justice".

On 9 November 2020, the ICC published its final report on the preliminary examination. It closed the case on the grounds that although it had concerns, it did not conclude that British authorities were "unwilling genuinely" to carry out investigations and prosecutions.

== See also ==
- International Criminal Court and Venezuela
- Command responsibility
- Abu Ghraib torture and prisoner abuse
- American Non-Governmental Organizations Coalition for the International Criminal Court
- Benjamin B. Ferencz
- War crimes committed by the United States
- Wedding party massacre
- Donald Payne (British Army soldier)
- July 12, 2007, Baghdad airstrike
