= James T. Hill =

US Army general

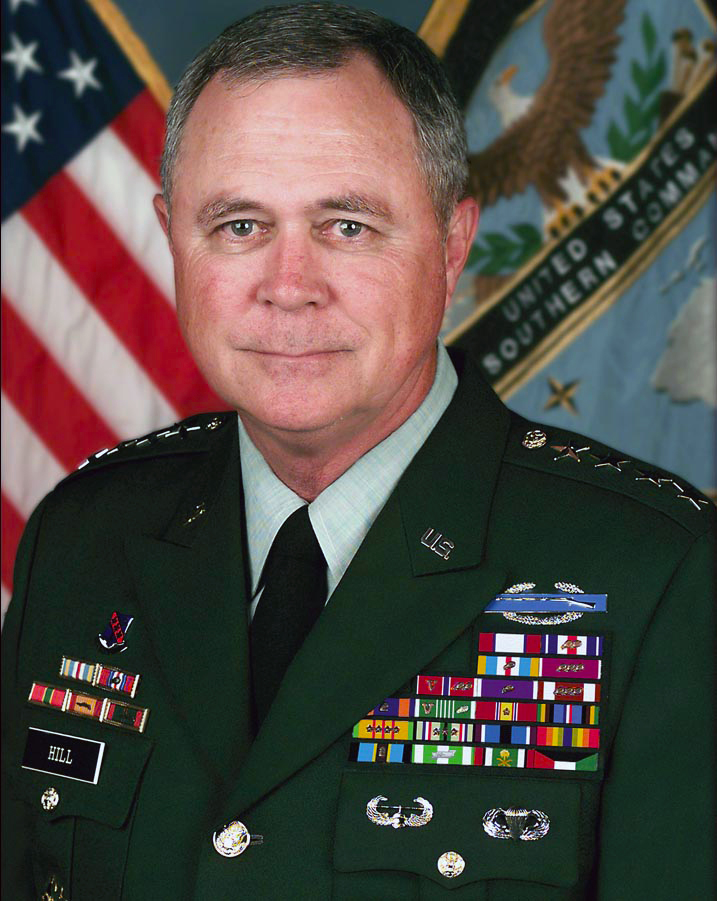
- General James T. Hill
- Born: 8 October 1946 (age 80); Dayton, Ohio, U.S.
- Military career
- Allegiance: United States
- Branch: United States Army
- Service years: 1968–2004
- Rank: General
- Commands: United States Southern Command; I Corps; 25th Infantry Division
- Conflicts: Vietnam War; Gulf War; Operation Uphold Democracy
- Awards: Army Distinguished Service Medal; Silver Star (3); Defense Superior Service Medal (2); Legion of Merit (4); Bronze Star Medal with "V" device (3); Purple Heart (2)

General James Thomas Hill (born 8 October 1946) is a retired United States Army four-star general who served as commander of United States Southern Command from 2002 to 2004. Hill also served as the Commanding General, I Corps and Fort Lewis.

== Military career ==
Hill is from El Paso, Texas, and was commissioned into the Infantry following graduation from Trinity University in San Antonio, Texas, in 1968. A graduate of the Command and General Staff College and the National War College, he also holds a master's degree in Personnel Management from Central Michigan University.

After completion of the Infantry Officers Basic, Ranger, and Airborne Courses, and an initial assignment at Fort Hood, Texas, Hill served with the 2–502nd Infantry, part of the 101st Airborne Division (Airmobile), in the Republic of Vietnam as a rifle platoon leader, recon platoon leader, company executive officer, and company commander.

Hill's other key assignments include Company Commander, 3d Ranger Company, Fort Benning and Commander, Company A, 2d Squadron, 7th Cavalry, Fort Hood; Battalion Operations Officer and Battalion Commander, 1–35th Infantry, Schofield Barracks; Staff Officer, Strategy, Plans and Policy Directorate, Office of the Deputy Chief of Staff, HQDA; Aide-de-Camp to the Chief of Staff of the Army, and Special Project Officer for the Chief of Staff of the Army. General Hill commanded the "Always First" Brigade, 101st Airborne Division (Air Assault) from August 1989 through July 1991, to include service in Southwest Asia during Operations Desert Shield and Desert Storm. General Hill served as Chief of Staff of the 101st Airborne Division (Air Assault) from August 1991 through October 1992. General Hill then served as the Assistant Deputy Director for Politico-Military Affairs on the Joint Staff from October 1992 to July 1994. In July 1994, he assumed duties as the Assistant Division Commander (Support), 25th Infantry Division (Light) to include service in Haiti as the Deputy Commanding General, Multinational Force and Deputy Commander, United States Forces, Haiti, United Nations Mission, Haiti. He served as the Deputy Chief of Staff, Operations, United States Army Forces Command, from June 1995 to June 1997. He became Commanding General, 25th Infantry Division (Light) in June 1997, and served in that position until he was named Commanding General, I Corps and Fort Lewis, in September 1999.

From 2002 until his retirement, Hill was the Commanding General of the United States Southern Command [SOUTHCOM], overseeing all US military forces in Central and South America. In that role he was responsible for requesting maximally permissive "enhanced interrogation" policies that led to torture in the Guantanamo Bay detention camp.

== Awards and decorations ==
Combat Infantryman Badge
Basic Parachutist Badge
Air Assault Badge
Joint Chiefs of Staff Identification Badge
Army Staff Identification Badge
101st Airborne Division Shoulder Sleeve Insignia – Former Wartime Service
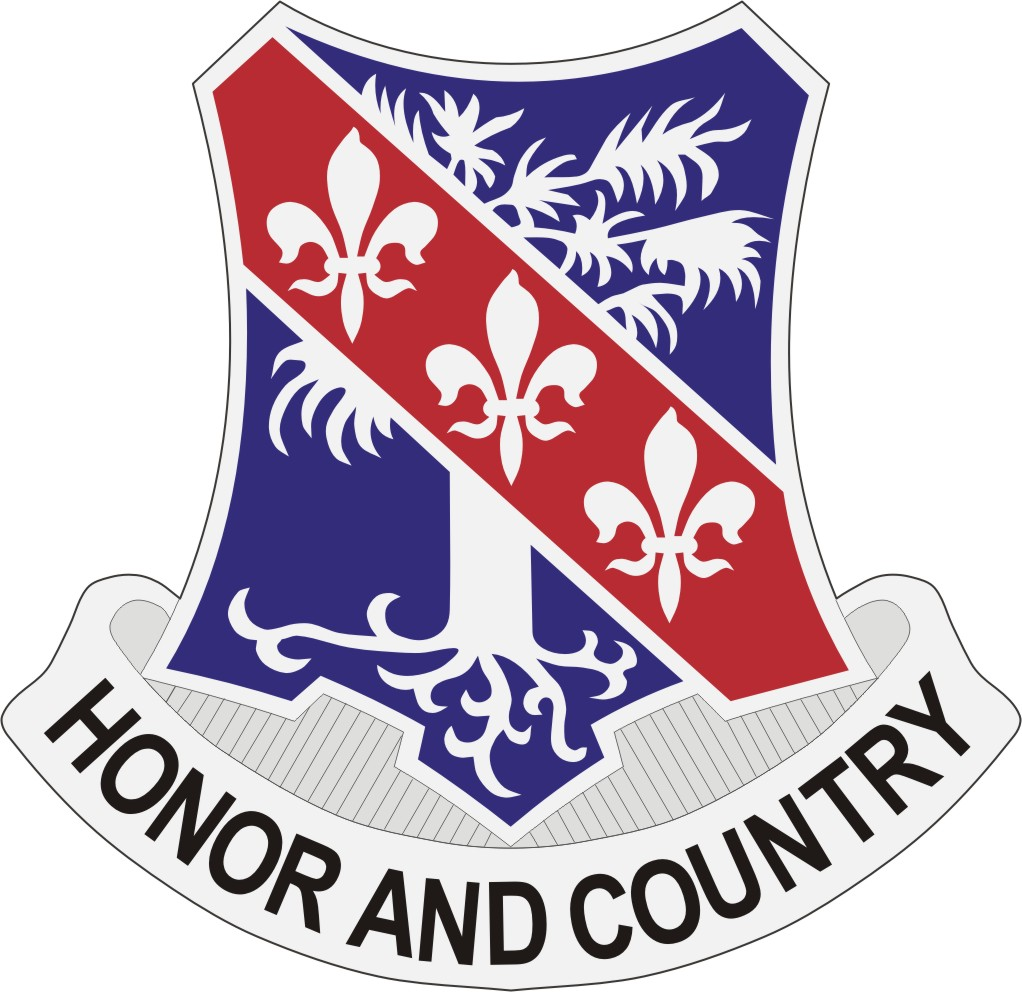
327th Infantry Regiment Distinctive Unit Insignia
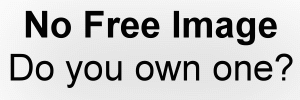
Unidentified foreign parachutist badge
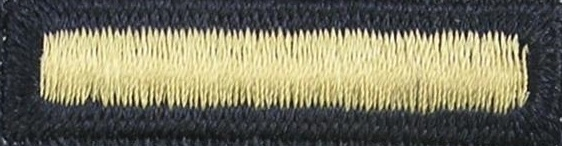
? Overseas Service Bars

Army Distinguished Service Medal
Silver Star with two oak leaf clusters
Defense Superior Service Medal with oak leaf cluster
Legion of Merit with three oak leaf clusters
Bronze Star with "V" device and two oak leaf clusters
Purple Heart with oak leaf cluster
Meritorious Service Medal with three oak leaf clusters
Air Medal with bronze award numeral 2
Army Commendation Medal with V device and silver oak leaf cluster
Joint Meritorious Unit Award
Valorous Unit Award with oak leaf cluster
Superior Unit Award
National Defense Service Medal with two bronze service stars
Armed Forces Expeditionary Medal with one service star
Vietnam Service Medal with four service stars
Southwest Asia Service Medal with three service stars
Humanitarian Service Medal
Army Service Ribbon
Army Overseas Service Ribbon with bronze award numeral 2
Vietnam Gallantry Cross Unit Citation
Vietnam Civil Actions Medal Unit Citation
Vietnam Campaign Medal
Kuwait Liberation Medal (Saudi Arabia)
Kuwait Liberation Medal (Kuwait)
Gold Medal for Distinguished Service (El Salvador)

== Post-military ==
Hill joined the board of trustees for Fraunhofer USA, a bio-technology firm, in 2006. He is also the founder of the J.T. Hill Group, a consulting firm in Coral Gables, Florida. In addition, he an advisor to and on the board of The Protective Group, a Texas-based security firm, and a consultant to Northrop Grumman and the Center for Molecular Biology and Enterprise Technology Partners. He remains involved in Latin American affairs, writing a regular column for the Colombian magazine PODER, and serving on the board of United for Colombia, a non-profit organization for providing medical treatment to landmine victims in Colombia. In Coral Gables he serves on the city's Emergency Management Committee, and he is a national advisor to The Military Child Education Coalition.

Military offices
Preceded by Peter Pace	United States Southern Command; 2002–2004	Succeeded by Bantz J. Craddock
