= John L. Washburn =

John L. Washburn (1937 - 13 July 2022) was the Convener for the American Non-Governmental Organizations Coalition for the International Criminal Court (AMICC) and co-chair of the Washington Working Group on the International Criminal Court (WICC). In addition, Washburn is an Adjunct Research Scholar for the International Criminal Court Program at the Columbia University Institute for the Study of Human Rights.

== Education ==
Washburn is a graduate of Harvard College (1959) and the Harvard Law School (1962). He is a Member of the Bar of the District of Columbia, and of the bars of the District Court and Circuit Court of Appeals in that jurisdiction.

== Previous positions ==
Washburn was a member of the United States Foreign Service from 1963 to 1987. During that period, John was Night Shift Chairman of the Iran Hostage Task Force in 1979. For this he received a special commendation from the Secretary of State for his service. He was also awarded the State Department's Meritorious Honor Award and Superior Honor Award. During 1977–1978, Washburn was a Congressional Fellow of the American Political Science Association, and served as a senior staff member for Senator William Proxmire of Wisconsin and for Congressman John Cavanaugh of Nebraska. Washburn conceived, helped to establish and was deputy director of an office within the Bureau of International Organization Affairs that furthered the coordination of American bilateral and multilateral diplomacy. From 1985 to 1987, he was a member of the Policy Planning Staff within the State Department.

From January 1988 to April 1993, John was a director in the Executive Office of the Secretary-General of the United Nations under Javier Pérez de Cuéllar and Boutros Boutros-Ghali.

Thereafter, Washburn served as a director in the United Nations Department of Political Affairs until March 1994.

Washburn is currently serving as Director and Convener for the American Non-governmental Organizations Coalition on the International Criminal Court (AMICC), Co-chair of the Washington Working Group on the International Criminal Court (WICC), and director of the activities of the United Nations Association of the USA (UNA-USA) concerned with the International Criminal Court. He serves on the board of the Global Justice Center, an international human rights law organization based in New York City.

He is a member of the Crimes Against Humanity Initiative Advisory Council, a project of the Whitney R. Harris World Law Institute at Washington University School of Law in St. Louis to establish the world's first treaty on the prevention and punishment of crimes against humanity.
