= United Nations Security Council Resolution 1487 =

UN Security Council Resolution 1487
- States party to the International Criminal Court
- Date: 12 June 2003
- Meeting no.: 4,772
- Code: S/RES/1487 (Document)
- Subject: United Nations peacekeeping
- Voting summary: 12 voted for; None voted against; 3 abstained
- Result: Adopted

Security Council composition
- Permanent members: China; France; Russia; United Kingdom; United States
- Non-permanent members: Angola; Bulgaria; Chile; Cameroon; Germany; Guinea; Mexico; Pakistan; Spain; Syria

United Nations Security Council resolution 1487, adopted on 12 June 2003, after noting the recent entry into force of the Rome Statute of the International Criminal Court, the Council granted a one-year extension for immunity from prosecution by the International Criminal Court (ICC) to United Nations peacekeeping personnel from countries that were not party to the ICC, beginning on 1 July 2003.

The resolution was passed at the insistence of the United States and came into effect on 1 July 2003 for a period of one year. France, Germany and Syria abstained from voting, arguing there was no justification to renew the measures. The Security Council refused to renew the exemption again in 2004 after pictures emerged of U.S. troops abusing Iraqi prisoners in Abu Ghraib, and the U.S. withdrew its demand.

== Resolution ==
=== Observations ===
In the preamble of the resolution, the Council noted the importance of United Nations operations in the maintenance of peace and security. It noted that not all countries were party to the ICC Statute or had chosen to accept its jurisdiction, and would continue to fulfil their responsibilities within their national jurisdictions with regard to international crimes.

=== Acts ===
Acting under Chapter VII of the United Nations Charter, the Security Council requested that the ICC, for a twelve-month period beginning on 1 July 2003, refrain from commencing or continuing investigations into personnel or officials from states not a party to the ICC Statute. It expressed its intention to renew the measure within twelve months for as long as necessary. Furthermore, the resolution asked that states were to take no actions contrary to the measure and their international obligations.

== See also ==
- History of United Nations peacekeeping
- List of United Nations peacekeeping missions
- List of United Nations Security Council Resolutions 1401 to 1500 (2002–2003)
- United Nations Security Council Resolution 1422
- United States and the International Criminal Court
