= Bantz J. Craddock =

US Army general

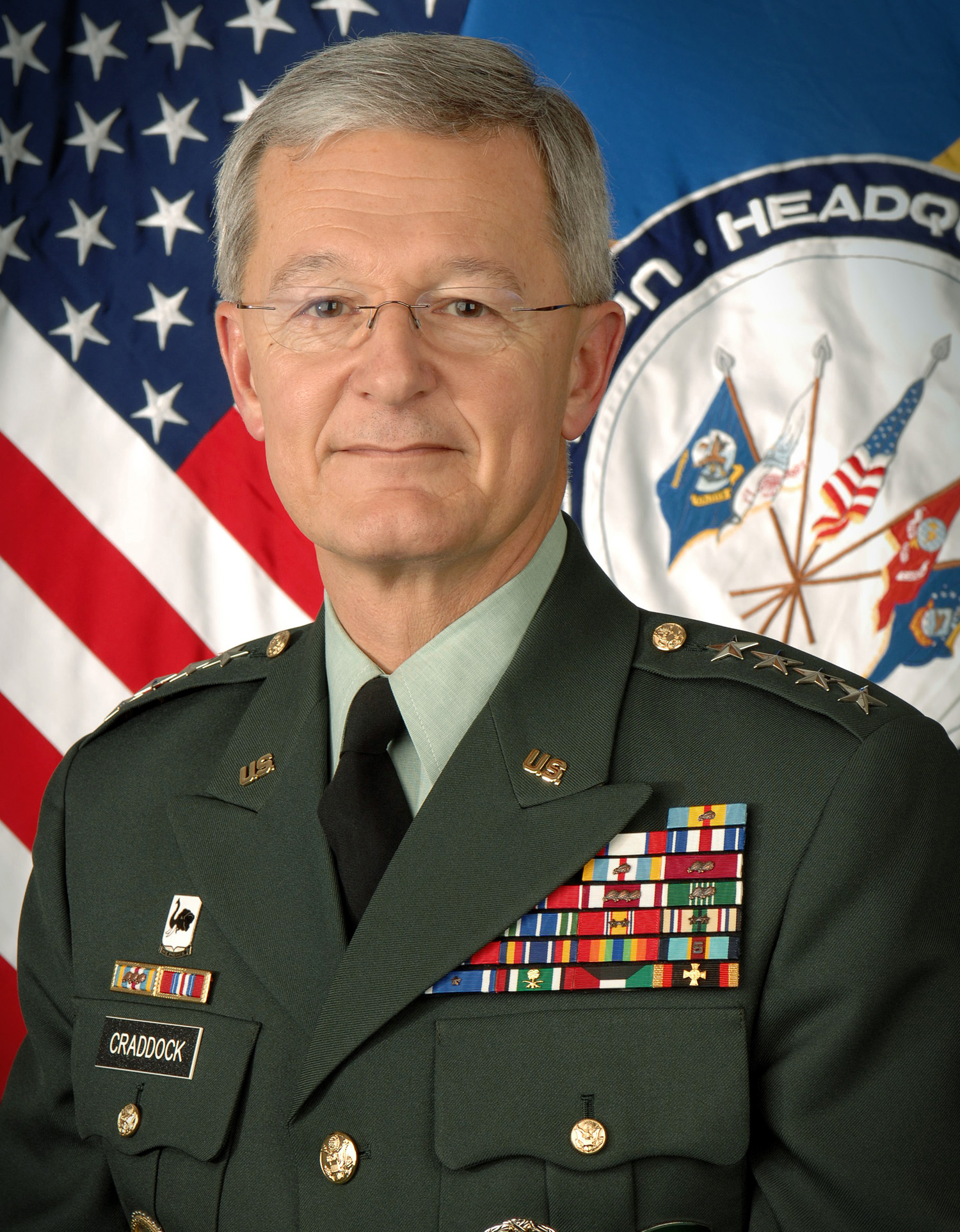
- Born: 24 August 1949 (age 77); Parkersburg, West Virginia, U.S.
- Military career
- Allegiance: United States
- Branch: United States Army
- Service years: 1971–2009
- Rank: General
- Commands: Supreme Allied Commander Europe; United States European Command; United States Southern Command; 1st Infantry Division (Mechanized); 7th Army Training Command; 194th Armored Brigade (Separate); 4th Battalion, 64th Armor Regiment
- Conflicts: Gulf War: Operation Desert Storm; Kosovo War
- Awards: Defense Distinguished Service Medal (2); Army Distinguished Service Medal; Silver Star; Defense Superior Service Medal (2); Legion of Merit (3); Bronze Star Medal; Bundeswehr Cross of Honor in Gold (Germany)
- Other work: MPRI, Inc.

Bantz John Craddock (born 24 August 1949) is a former United States Army general. His last military assignment was as Commander, United States European Command and NATO's Supreme Allied Commander Europe from December 2006 to 30 June 2009. He also served as Commander, United States Southern Command from 9 November 2004 to December 2006. After his retirement in 2009, he became chief executive of Military Professional Resources, Inc. (MPRI).

== Early life and education ==
Craddock was raised in Doddridge County, West Virginia. He graduated from Doddridge County High School in 1967.

== Military career ==
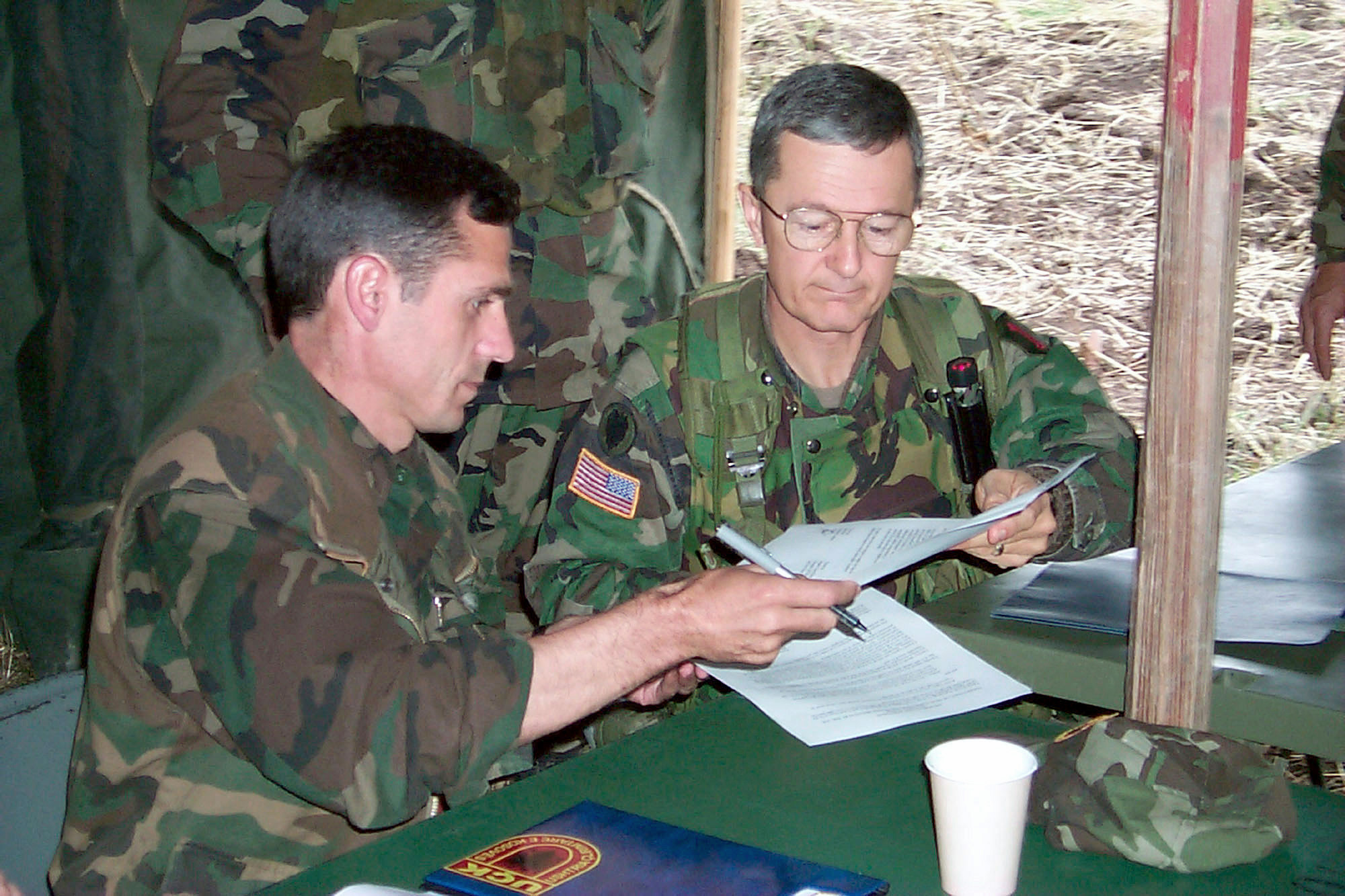
Craddock speaking with a Kosovar soldier in June 1999

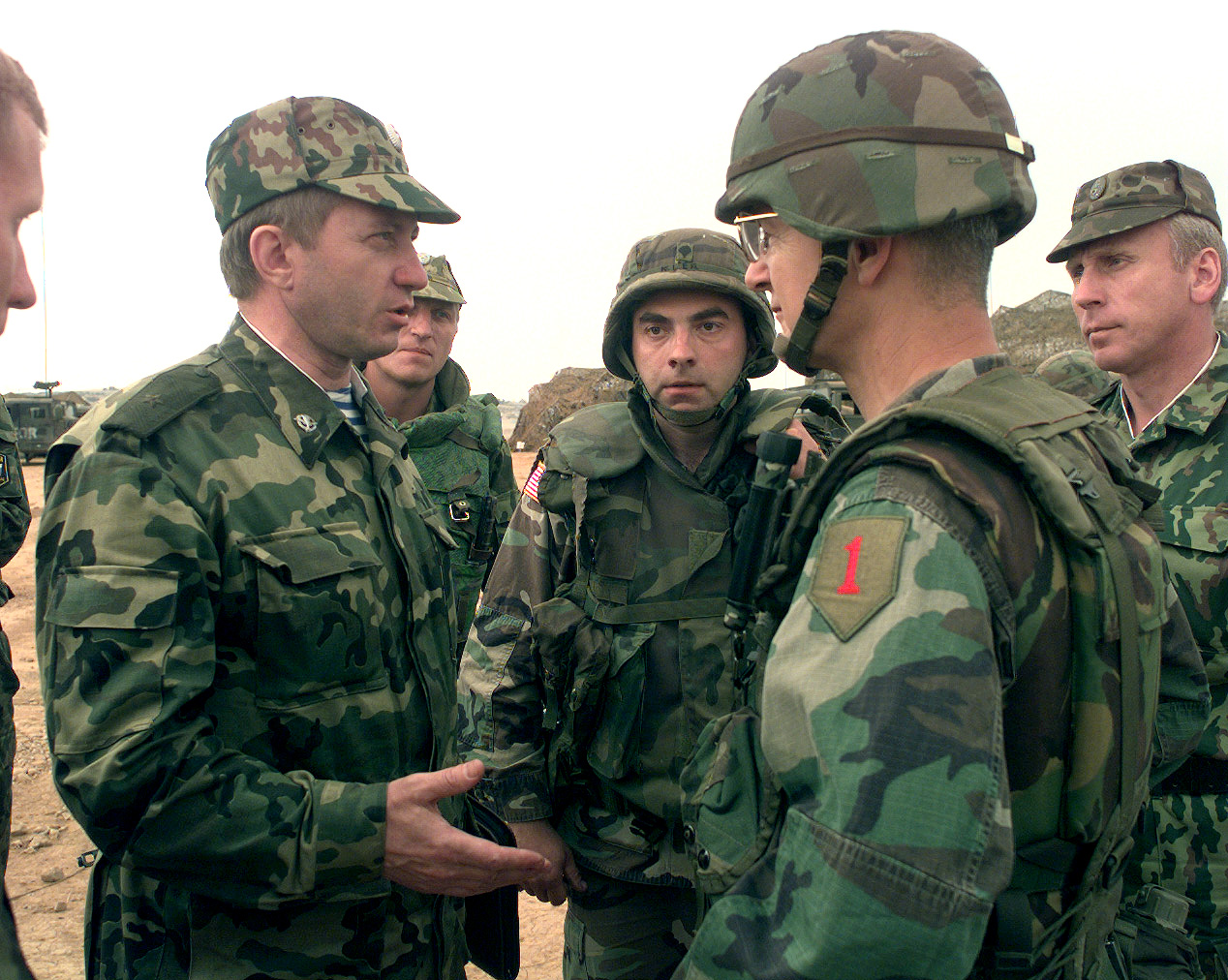
First meeting between Craddock and Major General Valery Yevtukhovich (left) commander of Russian Forces in Kosovo at Camp Bondsteel, Kosovo, on 7 July 1999

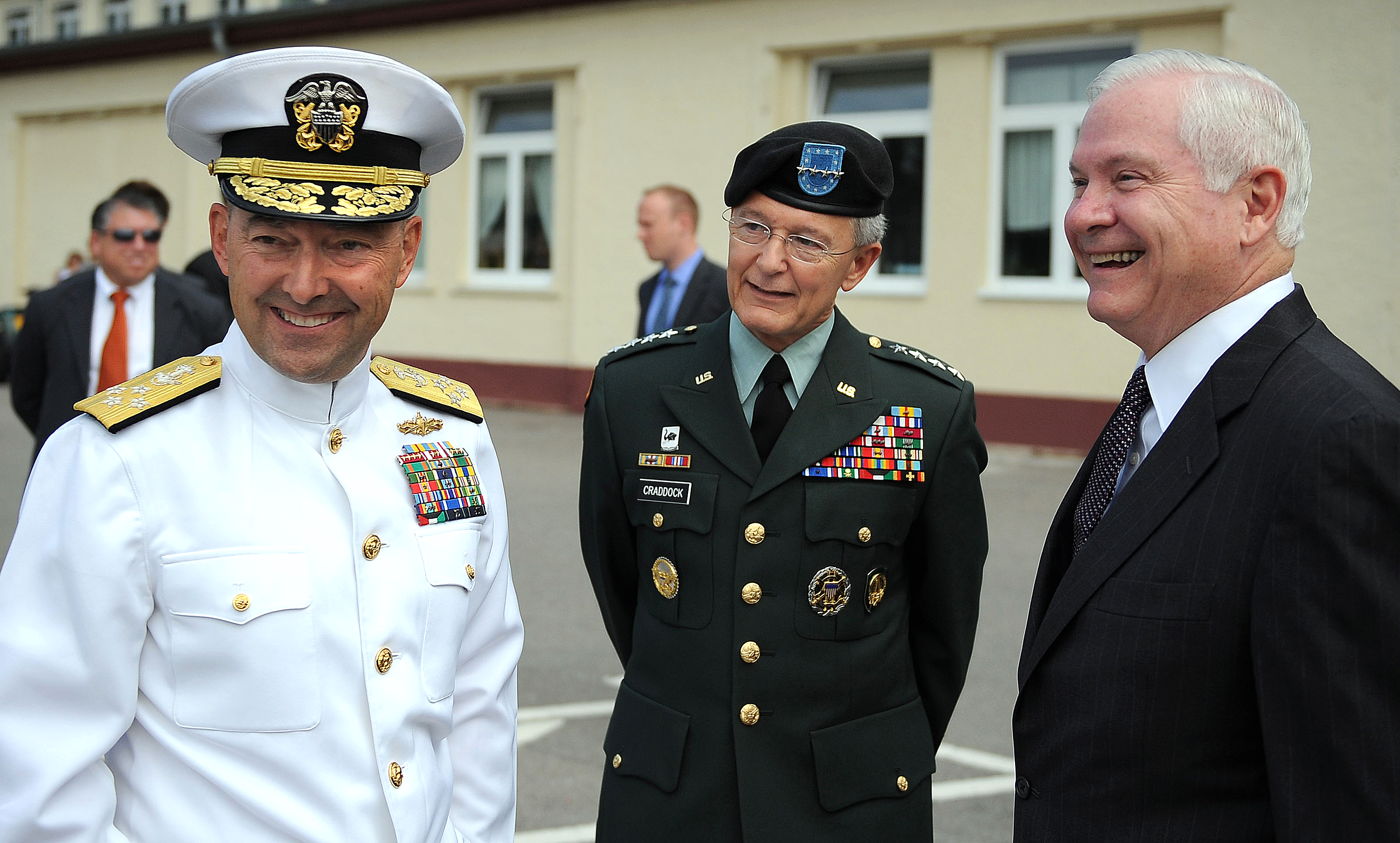
Craddock with U.S. Defense Secretary Robert Gates in June 2009

Craddock was commissioned as an Armor officer in the United States Army upon graduation from West Virginia University. His initial tour of duty was with the 3rd Armored Division in Germany, followed by an assignment at Fort Knox, Kentucky, as an armor test officer for the United States Army Armor and Engineer Board. After completion of the Armor Officer Advanced Course, he was again assigned to the 3rd Armored Division, commanding a tank company in the 1st Battalion, 32nd Armor Regiment.

In September 1981, Craddock was reassigned to the Office of the Program Manager, Abrams Tank Systems in Warren, Michigan, as a Systems Analyst and later as Program Executive Officer. After graduation from the Command and General Staff College, Craddock joined the 8th Infantry Division (Mechanized) in Germany, serving as the Executive Officer of the 4th Battalion, 69th Armor Regiment for two years. He was subsequently reassigned to the Division Headquarters as the Deputy G3, Operations.

In May 1989, Craddock assumed command of the 4th Battalion, 64th Armor Regiment at Fort Stewart, Georgia. He commanded the Tuskers for 26 months, deploying as part of Operation Desert Shield and Desert Storm. Following command, Craddock was the Assistant Chief of Staff, G3, Operations, for the 24th Division. Subsequently, he attended the United States Army War College, graduating in 1993. Craddock then assumed command of the 194th Armored Brigade (Separate) at Fort Knox. In June 1995, Craddock inactivated the brigade as part of the United States Army's post-cold war drawdown, and was assigned as the Assistant Chief of Staff, G3, for III Corps at Fort Hood, Texas.

In 1996, Craddock was reassigned to the Joint Staff in the Pentagon as an Assistant Deputy Director in J5. In August 1998, he joined the 1st Infantry Division (Mechanized) in Germany as the Assistant Division Commander for Maneuver. While serving in that capacity, Craddock was designated as Commander of United States Forces for the initial entry operation into Kosovo. In August 1999, Craddock was reassigned as the Commanding General of the 7th Army Training Command, United States Army Europe. In September 2000, Craddock assumed command of the 1st Infantry Division (Mechanized) – the "Big Red One".

From August 2002 to 2004, Craddock served as the Senior Military Assistant to Secretary of Defense Donald Rumsfeld.

Craddock served as Combatant Commander of United States Southern Command from 2004 until 2006. On 14 July 2006, NATO announced that Craddock would succeed James L. Jones as Supreme Allied Commander Europe (SACEUR) — NATO's top commander of operations in Europe. The change-of-command ceremony at Mons, Belgium, occurred on December 7, 2006.

=== Controversy ===
Craddock defended the controversial Guantanamo Bay detention camp against criticism. While overseeing Guantanamo, he blocked attempts to get a commander of the camp reprimanded over abuse claims. Craddock insisted that the officer had done nothing wrong.

On 28 January 2009, Der Spiegel reported obtaining a classified NATO document in which Craddock ordered troops to kill drug traffickers and bomb narcotics laboratories in Afghanistan, even if there is no evidence that they are involved in terrorist activities.

Former U.S. Defense Secretary Robert Gates' book Duty is very critical of Craddock in his role as Supreme Allied Commander Europe. Gates cites examples where Craddock did not want fellow United States Army generals, such as Stanley A. McChrystal, to attend coalition meetings with partner nations. At one point Craddock provided his unsolicited advice to Gates regarding who he thought should attend a senior coalition meeting. Gates then had to order Craddock to carry out the mission as instructed by him. In the book, Gates goes on to opine that was the only time in his career in governmental service in which he had to "order" a general officer to carry out a specific task.

== Awards and decorations ==
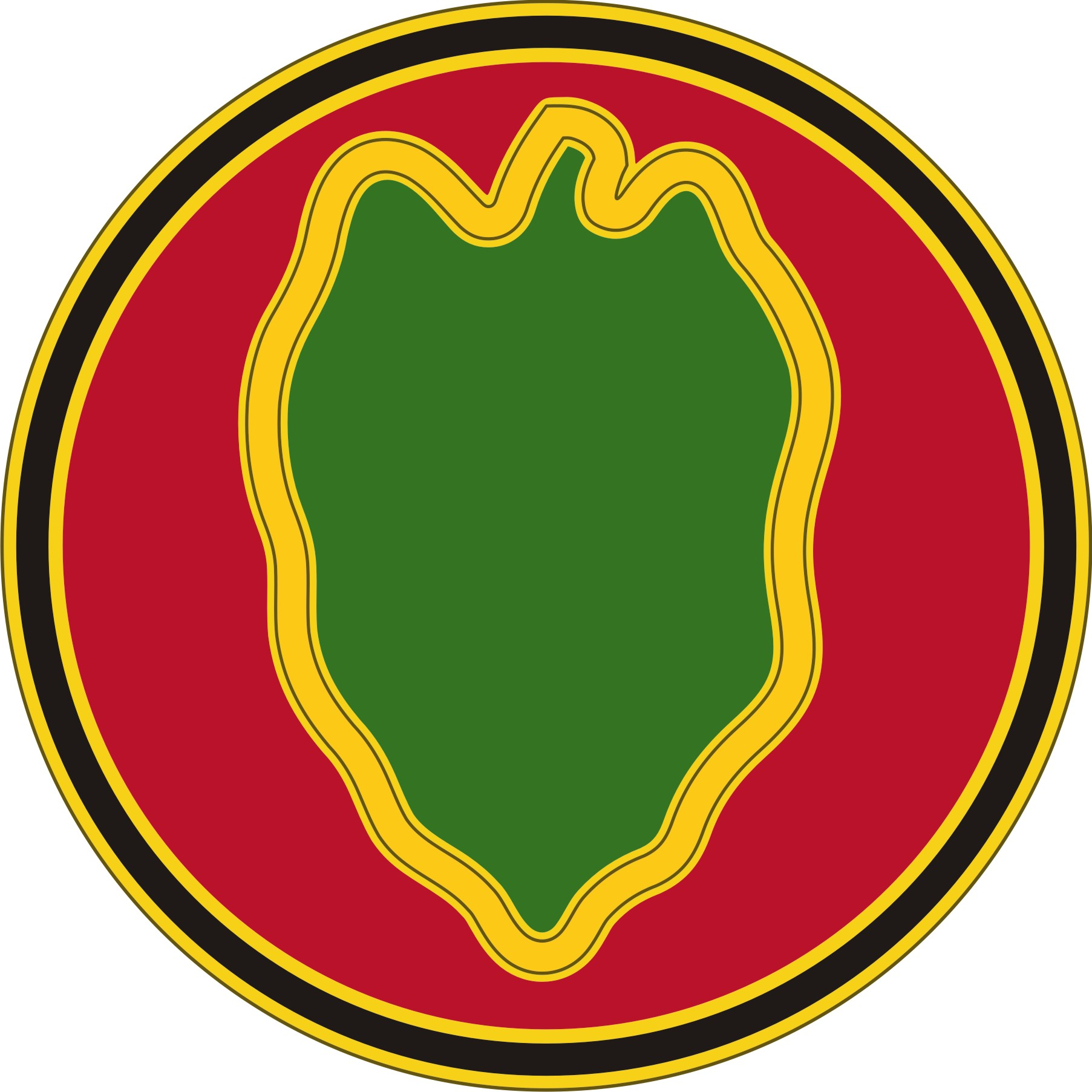
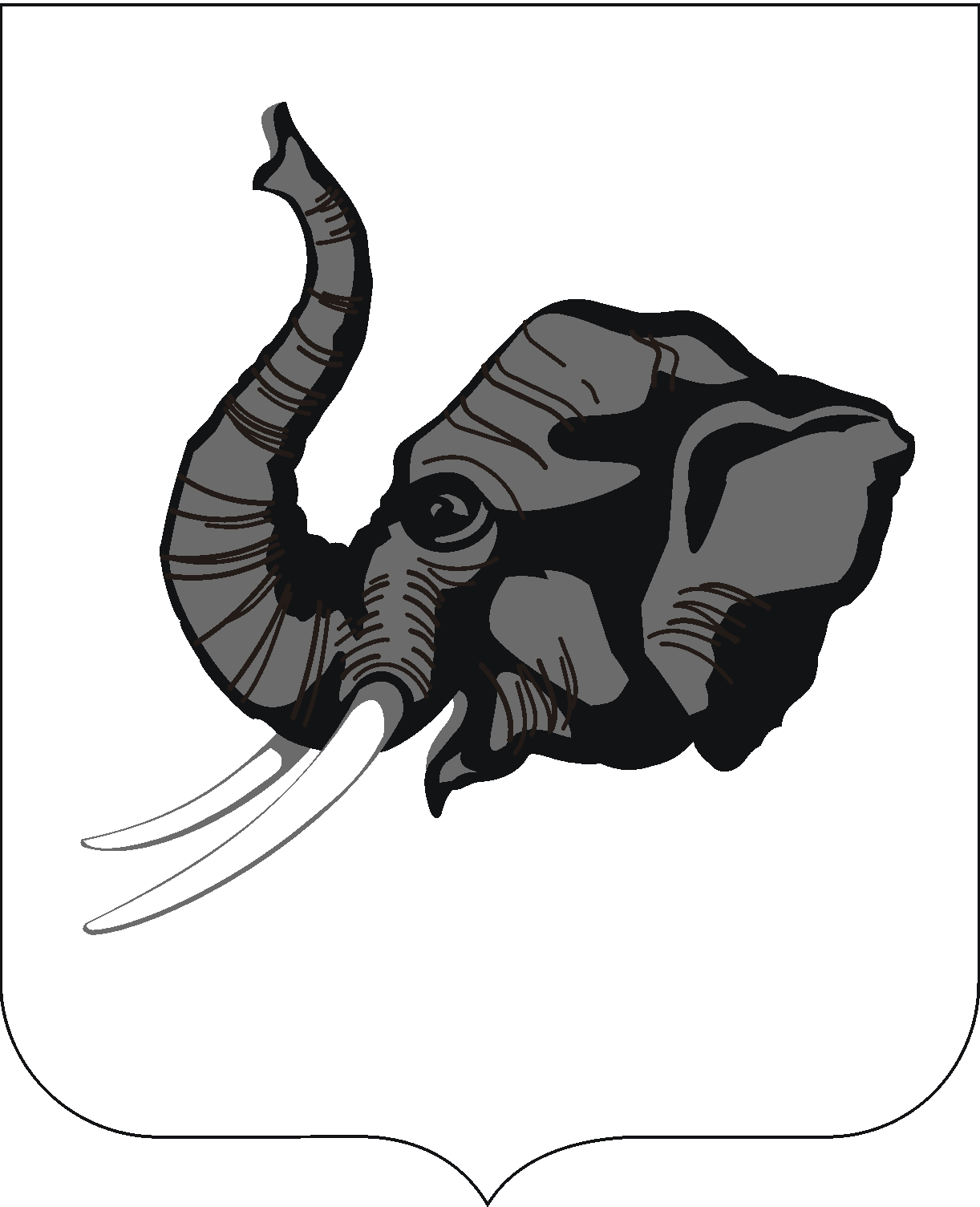
| Office of the Secretary of Defense Identification Badge |
| Joint Chiefs of Staff Badge |
| SACEUR Badge |
| 24th Infantry Division Combat Service Identification Badge |
| 64th Armor Regiment Distinctive Unit Insignia |

| Defense Distinguished Service Medal with 1 Oak Leaf Cluster |
| Army Distinguished Service Medal |
| Silver Star |
| Defense Superior Service Medal with 1 Oak Leaf Cluster |
| Legion of Merit with 2 Oak Leaf Clusters |
| Bronze Star Medal |
| Meritorious Service Medal with 3 Oak Leaf Clusters |
| Army Commendation Medal with 2 Oak Leaf Clusters |
| Army Achievement Medal |
| Joint Meritorious Unit Award with 3 Oak Leaf Clusters |
| Valorous Unit Award |
| National Defense Service Medal (with two bronze service stars) |
| Southwest Asia Service Medal (with two bronze service stars) |
| Kosovo Campaign Medal (with two bronze service stars) |
| Global War on Terrorism Service Medal |
| Army Service Ribbon |
| Overseas Service Ribbon (with award numeral 5) |
| NATO Meritorious Service Medal |
| NATO Medal for Yugoslavia with bronze service star |
| Bundeswehr Gold Cross of Honor |
| El Salvador Gold Medal for Distinguished Services |
| Cross of Military Merit, First Class (Guatemala) |
| Nicaraguan decoration (Unidentified) |
| Commander's Cross of the Order of Merit of the Republic of Poland |
| Estonian Order of the Cross of the Eagle First Class |
| Canadian Meritorious Service Cross (Military Division) |
| Kuwait Liberation Medal (Saudi Arabia) |
| Kuwait Liberation Medal (Kuwait) |

Additionally, Craddock has been honored of the following associations:

- United States Armor Association — Order of Saint George
- National Infantry Association — Order of Saint Maurice (United States) Legionnaire
- Ordnance Association — Order of Samuel Sharpe, Honorary Kentucky Colonel
- Honorary Texan, Artillery Association — Order of Saint Barbara

== Personal life ==
A bridge in Doddridge County, West Virginia, on Route 50 was dedicated to Craddock in 2006.

Military offices
| Preceded by John P. Abizaid | Commanding General of the 1st Infantry Division; 2000–2002 | Succeeded by John Batiste |
| Preceded by Edmund P. Giambastiani | Senior Military Assistant to the Secretary of Defense; 2002–2004 | Succeeded by James G. Stavridis |
| Preceded by James T. Hill | Commander, United States Southern Command; 2004–2006 | Succeeded by James G. Stavridis |
| Preceded by James L. Jones | Commander, United States European Command; 2006–2009 | Succeeded by James G. Stavridis |
| Preceded by James L. Jones | Supreme Allied Commander Europe; 2006–2009 | Succeeded by James G. Stavridis |
