= United Nations Security Council Resolution 1422 =

UN Security Council Resolution 1422
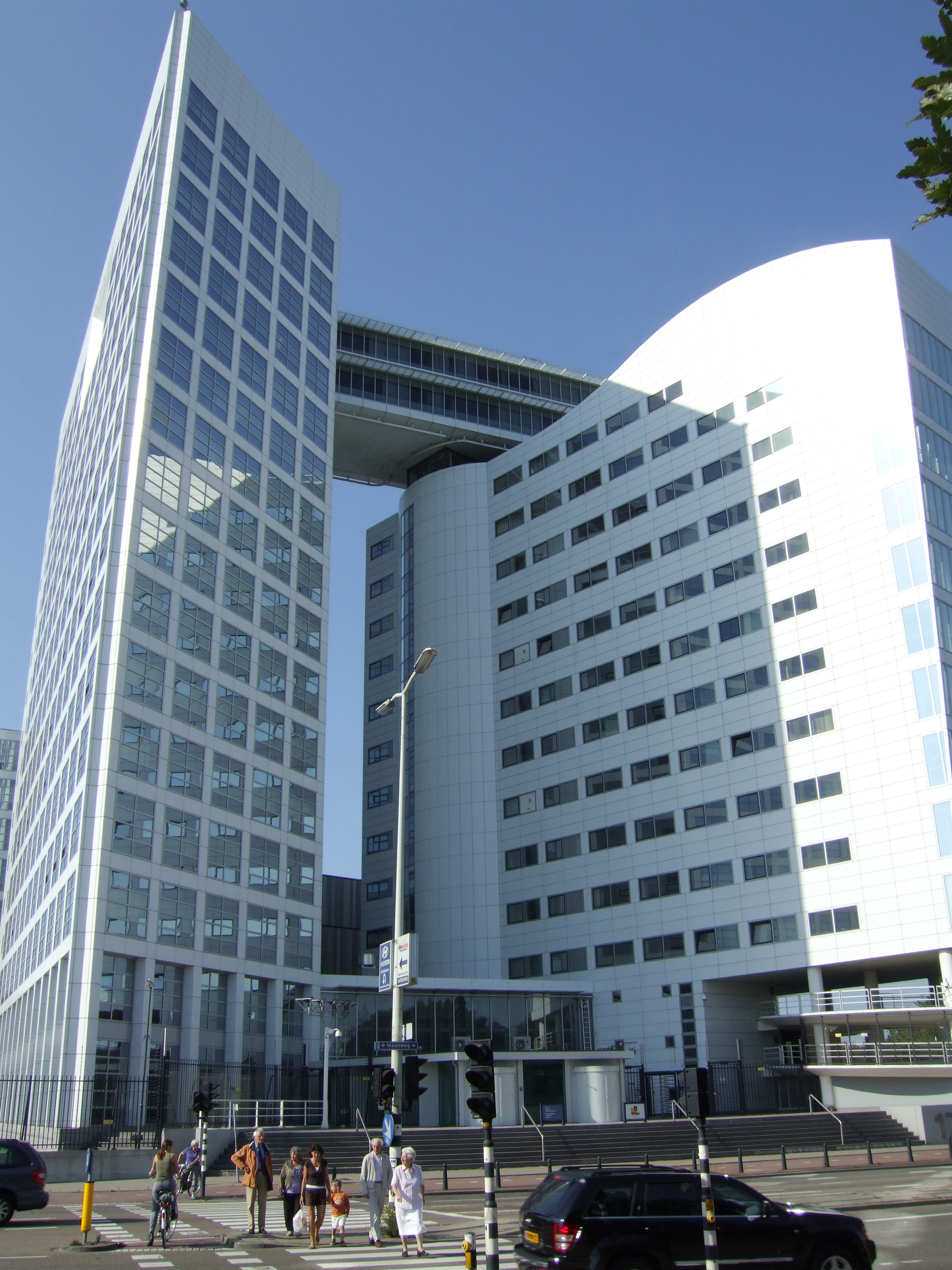
- International Criminal Court in The Hague
- Date: 12 July 2002
- Meeting no.: 4,572
- Code: S/RES/1422 (Document)
- Subject: United Nations peacekeeping
- Voting summary: 15 voted for; None voted against; None abstained
- Result: Adopted

Security Council composition
- Permanent members: China; France; Russia; United Kingdom; United States
- Non-permanent members: Bulgaria; Cameroon; Colombia; Guinea; Ireland; Mauritius; Mexico; Norway; Singapore; Syria

United Nations Security Council resolution 1422, adopted unanimously on 12 July 2002, after noting the recent entry into force of the Rome Statute of the International Criminal Court, the Council granted immunity from prosecution by the International Criminal Court (ICC) to United Nations peacekeeping personnel from countries that were not party to the ICC.

The resolution was passed at the insistence of the United States, which threatened to veto the renewal of all United Nations peacekeeping missions (including the renewal of the United Nations Mission in Bosnia and Herzegovina passed the same day) unless its citizens were shielded from prosecution by the ICC. Resolution 1422 came into effect on 1 July 2002 for a period of one year. It was renewed for twelve months by Resolution 1487, passed on 12 June 2003. However, the Security Council refused to renew the exemption again in 2004 after pictures emerged of U.S. troops abusing Iraqi prisoners in Abu Ghraib, and the U.S. withdrew its demand.

== Resolution ==
=== Observations ===
In the preamble of the resolution, the Council noted the importance of United Nations operations in the maintenance of peace and security. It noted that not all countries were party to the ICC Statute or had chosen to accept its jurisdiction, and would continue to fulfil their responsibilities within their national jurisdictions with regard to international crimes.

=== Acts ===
Acting under Chapter VII of the United Nations Charter, the Security Council requested that the ICC, for a twelve-month period beginning on 1 July 2002, refrain from commencing or continuing investigations into personnel or officials from states not a party to the ICC Statute. It expressed its intention to renew the measure within twelve months for as long as necessary. Furthermore, the resolution asked that states were to take no actions contrary to the measure and their international obligations.

== See also ==
- History of United Nations peacekeeping
- List of United Nations peacekeeping missions
- List of United Nations Security Council Resolutions 1401 to 1500 (2002–2003)
- United States and the International Criminal Court
