= American Service-Members' Protection Act =

US federal law

- Nicknames: Hague Invasion Act
- Effective: August 2, 2002

Citations
- Public law: 107-206
- Statutes at Large: 116 Stat. 820

Codification
- U.S.C. sections created: 22 USC §§ 7421-7433

Legislative history
- Introduced in the House as H.R. 4775 by Bill Young (R–FL); Passed the House on May 24, 2002 (280–138); Passed the Senate on June 7, 2002 (71–22); Reported by the joint conference committee on July 23, 2002; agreed to by the House of Representatives on July 23, 2002 (397–32) and by the Senate on July 24, 2002 (92–7); Signed into law by President George W. Bush on August 2, 2002

The American Service-Members' Protection Act (ASPA), known informally as the Hague Invasion Act (Title 2 of Pub. L. 107–206 (text) (PDF), H.R. 4775, 116 Stat. 820, enacted August 2, 2002), is a United States federal law described as "a bill to protect United States military personnel and other elected and appointed officials of the United States government against criminal prosecution by an international criminal court to which the United States is not party." The text of the ASPA has been codified as subchapter II of chapter 81 of Title 22, United States Code. The act gives the president power to use "all means necessary and appropriate to bring about the release of any U.S. or allied personnel being detained or imprisoned by, on behalf of, or at the request of the International Criminal Court" (ICC), located in The Hague, Netherlands.

== Description ==
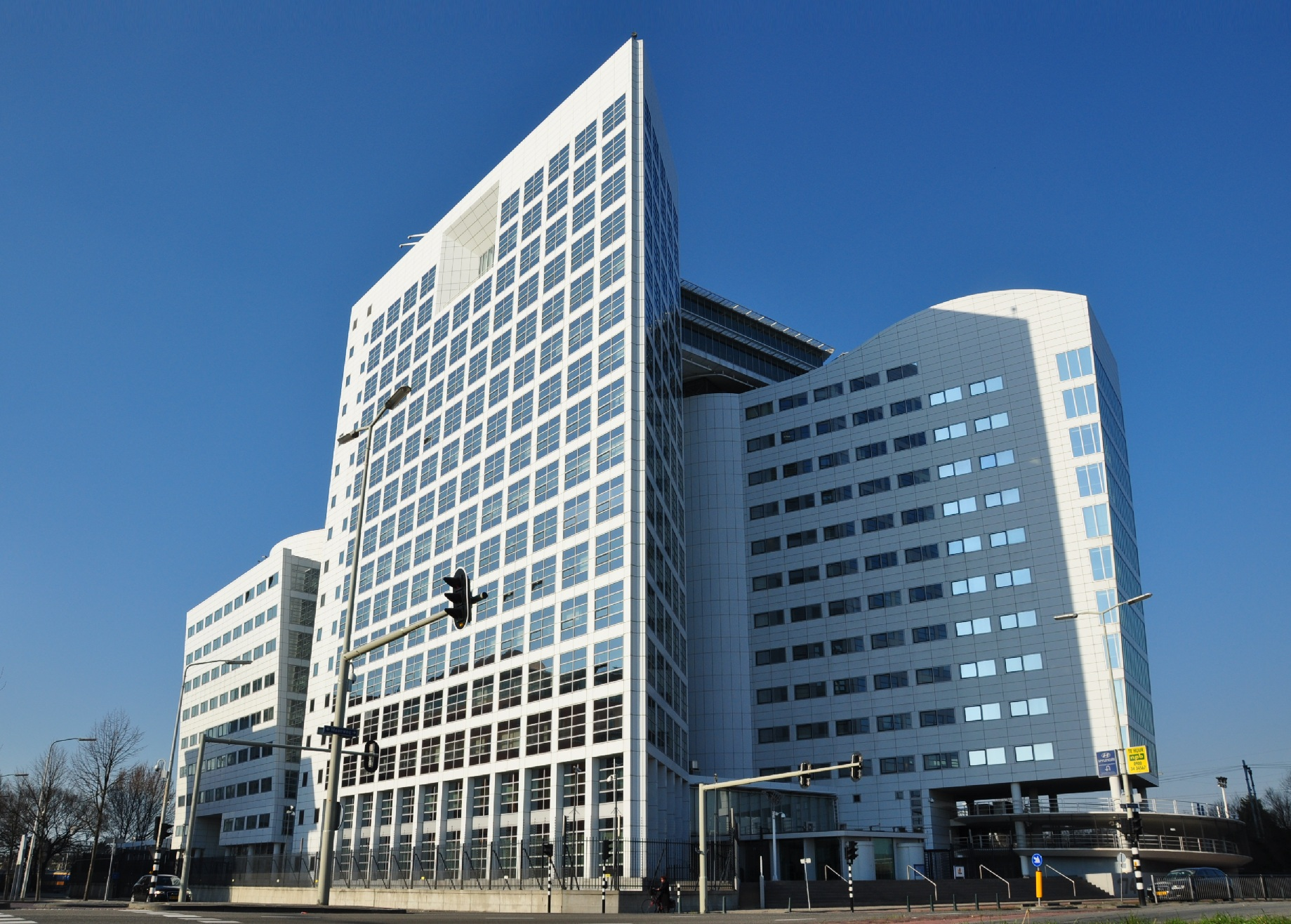
Buildings at Maanweg 174, The Hague, where the ICC was based until 2015

The United States is not a member of the International Criminal Court (ICC). The American Service-Members' Protection Act (ASPA) authorizes the U.S. President to use "all means necessary and appropriate to bring about the release of any U.S. or allied personnel being detained or imprisoned by, on behalf of, or at the request of the International Criminal Court". This authorization led to the act being nicknamed the Hague Invasion Act, since the act would allow the president to order military action on The Hague, the seat of the ICC, to prevent U.S. or allied officials and military personnel from being prosecuted or detained by the ICC.

=== Adoption ===
The bill was introduced by U.S. Senator Jesse Helms (Republican from North Carolina) and U.S. Representative Tom DeLay (Republican from Texas), as an amendment to the 2002 Supplemental Appropriations Act for Further Recovery From and Response to Terrorist Attacks on the United States (H.R. 4775). The amendment (S.Amdt 3597) was passed 75–19 by the U.S. Senate, with 30 Democrats and 45 Republicans voting in support. The bill was signed into law by President George W. Bush on August 2, 2002.

=== Contents ===
Section 2008 of the ASPA authorizes the president of the U.S. "to use all means necessary and appropriate to bring about the release of any person described in subsection (b) who is being detained or imprisoned by, on behalf of, or at the request of the International Criminal Court", while Section 2013 specifies this authority shall extend to "covered United States persons" (members of the U.S. Armed Forces, elected or appointed officials of the U.S. Government, and other persons employed by, or working on behalf of, the U.S. Government) and "covered allied persons" (military personnel, elected or appointed officials, and other persons employed by, or working on behalf of, the government of a NATO member country or a major non-NATO ally, including Australia, Egypt, Israel, Japan, Jordan, Argentina, South Korea, New Zealand, and Taiwan).

The ASPA prohibits federal, state, and local governments and agencies (including courts and law enforcement agencies) from assisting the ICC. For example, it prohibits the extradition of any person from the U.S. to the ICC; it prohibits the transfer of classified national security information and law enforcement information to the ICC; and it prohibits agents of the court from conducting investigations in the U.S. Additionally, the ASPA does not prohibit the U.S. from assisting in the search and capture of foreign nationals wanted for prosecution by the ICC, specifically naming Saddam Hussein, Slobodan Milošević, Omar al-Bashir, and Osama bin Laden as examples.

== Reception ==
The reaction within the European Union was overwhelmingly negative. A European Parliament resolution on July 4, 2002, condemned the act while it was in its draft stage.

The Dutch reaction to the ASPA was negative, taking issue with section 2008 of the bill. The Dutch Ambassador to the United States, Boudewijn van Eenennaam, voiced his protests saying that the Dutch were "Not particularly amused by Section 2008" and that "we think the language used was ill-considered to say the least". Meanwhile, the Dutch House of Representatives passed a motion expressing its concern about the bill and its "detrimental" effects on transatlantic relations. The Danish Minister for European Affairs, Bertel Haarder, stated that the law contradicted the idea of upholding human rights and the rule of law, while German Foreign Minister Joschka Fischer penned a letter cautioning that "adopting the ASPA would open a rift between the U.S. and the European Union on this important issue [of the ICC]".

The Coalition for the International Criminal Court has called the act a "dangerous symbolic opposition to international criminal justice", and Human Rights Watch condemned the law.

== Repeal attempt ==
In 2022 U.S. Representative Ilhan Omar introduced an attempt to repeal the act to the House of Representatives, but the bill died in committee and no vote was ever taken.

== See also ==
- United States and the International Criminal Court
- Universal jurisdiction
- Status of forces agreement
