= Presidential exemption =

A presidential exemption is the power of President of a state to overrule or exempt certain laws or legal decisions.

== United States ==
As an example from the separation of federal and state powers of the United States, in the U.S. Code Title 16 Chapter 33 "COASTAL ZONE MANAGEMENT", Presidential exemptions are governed by § 1456 - "Coordination and cooperation", subparagraph (c) (1) (B): under certain conditions,

...the President may, upon written request from the Secretary, exempt from compliance those elements of the Federal agency activity that are found by the Federal court to be inconsistent with an approved State program, if the President determines that the activity is in the paramount interest of the United States.

== See also ==
- Presidential exemption for Jews
- Presidential waiver
