= American Non-Governmental Organizations Coalition for the International Criminal Court =

American Non-Governmental Organizations Coalition for the International Criminal Court (AMICC)
- Formation: 2001
- Type: Non-profit; NGO
- Purpose: Advocating for full US support for the ICC and earliest possible US ratification of the Court's Rome Statute
- Location: Secretariat in New York City
- Members: Over 40 American Non-Governmental Organizations
- Convenor: John L. Washburn
- Website: http://www.amicc.org

The American Non-Governmental Organizations Coalition for the International Criminal Court (AMICC) leads the civil society movement for full United States participation in the International Criminal Court.

With over 40 member and observer organizations, AMICC is a national coalition made up of US-based non-governmental organizations that works to build support for the International Criminal Court (ICC) in the United States. AMICC is a program of the Columbia University Institute for the Study of Human Rights.

== Objectives ==
AMICC is a coalition of non-governmental organizations committed to achieving full United States support for the International Criminal Court (ICC) and the earliest possible US ratification of the Court's Rome Statute.

The Coalition supports and promotes grassroots activity in support of the Court, including the formation of local alliances of individuals and organizations whose interests will be served and advanced by the ICC and by a positive US relationship with it. The member organizations include bar associations, women's groups, human rights organizations, religious organizations, veterans' groups, victims organizations, students and young adults, and others. These organizations may have sharply differing views on other political and social issues, but hold that the ICC expresses and implements values traditionally championed by the United States, including international justice and the rule of law. Together they work effectively to promote a Court which implements their common intense opposition to international atrocities and to holding accountable those most responsible for them.

== AMICC Membership ==
=== Current AMICC Members ===
- Advocates for Survivors of Trauma and Torture (ASTT)
- American Bar Association Section of International Law
- American Humanist Association (AHA)
- American Jewish Committee/ Jacob Blaustein Institute for the Advancement of Human Rights
- Amnesty International USA
- Baha'is of the United States
- Church World Service
- Citizens for Global Solutions
- Coalition for the International Criminal Court (CICC)
- Council for American Students in International Negotiations (CASIN)
- DePaul University College of Law International Human Rights Law Institute International Human Rights Law Institute
- Evangelical Lutheran Church in America
- Fellowship of Reconciliation
- Feminist Majority Foundation
- Human Rights First (formerly Lawyers Committee for Human Rights)
- Human Rights Watch
- Imani Works
- International Committee on Offensive Microwave Weapons
- International Federation of Women Lawyers
- Lawyers' Committee on Nuclear Policy
- Maryknoll Fathers, Brothers, Sisters and Lay Missioners
- National Association of Criminal Defense Lawyers (NACDL)
- National Lawyers Guild, International Committee
- National Service Conference of the American Ethical Union
- Philadelphia Bar Association
- Presbyterian Church (USA)
- Unitarian Universalist Association
- United Church of Christ
- United Methodist Church
- United Nations Association of the United States of America
- Veterans for Peace
- Washington Kurdish Institute
- Women's International League for Peace and Freedom (WILPF), US Section

=== OBSERVERS ===
- Commission on Social Action of Reform Judaism
- US Fund for UNICEF
- Women's Initiatives for Gender Justice
- Women's Bar Association of the State of New York

== Local AMICC Alliances ==
AMICC's Local Alliances for the ICC advocate full U.S. participation in the ICC, and the earliest possible ratification of the Rome Statute. Through broad alliances of the legal, academic, human rights and faith-based communities, they coordinate activities in the support of the Court and act as a resource for those seeking information about the movement for the ICC.

LOCAL ALLIANCES

Arkansas

California

Los Angeles - ICC Alliance (ICCA)

San Francisco

Illinois

Chicago Alliance for the ICC (CAICC)

Indiana

Iowa

Kentucky

Kentuckians for the ICC

Maine

Maine Alliance for the ICC (MAICC)

Minnesota

Missouri

St. Louis

New Mexico

New York

Brooklyn

Texas

Austin

Dallas

San Antonio

== The Faith and Ethics Network for the ICC ==
The United States Faith and Ethics Network for the International Criminal Court (US FENICC) is a coalition of religious and interfaith NGOs that examine the moral, ethical and religious considerations surrounding the Court. Religious organizations have a special role to play in raising awareness at the grassroots level and helping to shape the ICC. The Network promotes the ICC by disseminating information about the Court to respective religious, ecumenical, and ethical communities. To inform others about some of the moral, ethical and religious considerations involved in the ICC, the Network holds frequent group meetings and plans events that will bring these issues to the attention of a wider audience. The issues that the group raises and decides upon will impact the role the court will play and the way it is perceived around the world. The following issues are among those that have been and will be discussed by the working group in their meetings as well as in their open events and dialogues: moral, ethical and theological imperatives and the importance of the ICC as a powerful representation of these values; moral, political and ethical dimensions of impunity, reconciliation, and long term peace building; individual and collective healing in society; redressive justice relationships between confession, repentance, compensation and forgiveness issues of psychological and spiritual rehabilitation.

Current member organizations

- Al-Khoei Foundation
- American Humanist Association
- Baha'is of the United States
- Church World Service
- Conference of Major Superiors of Men
- Evangelical Lutheran Church in America
- Fellowship of Reconciliation
- Jacob Blaustein Institute for the Advancement of Human Rights of the American Jewish Committee
- The Loretto Community
- Maryknoll Office for Global Concerns
- National Council of Churches of Christ in the USA
- National Service Conference of the American Ethical Union
- Presbyterian Church, USA
- Religious of the Sacred Heart
- Soka Gakkai International
- Temple of Understanding
- Unitarian Universalist Association
- General Board of Church and Society of the United Methodist Church
- World Council of Churches

== See also ==
- United States and the International Criminal Court
- International Criminal Court
- International Criminal Law
- Command responsibility
- Criminal law
- Human rights
- International law
- Coalition for the International Criminal Court
