= Executive waiver =

Administrative tool that can be invoked by American presidents

An executive waiver is an administrative tool used by presidents of the United States, and other of its Federal executives, permitting the selective enforcement of some laws. The right of the president to delay implementation of certain provisions is normally written into a law, to provide flexibility that Congress cannot offer.

Such waivers enhance presidential control of domestic policy. Waivers are sometimes used in grant programs to allow experimentation and flexibility. There is also an extraordinary circumstances waiver in Section 502b of the Foreign Assistance Act.

Ronald Reagan's administration used waivers in dealing with the Aid to Families with Dependent Children program in the 1980s. President Bill Clinton also employed waivers to give state's flexibility in Welfare reform. Medicaid waivers have also been used. President Obama used executive waivers in 2015 to lift most sanctions on Iran in return for Iran not pursuing nuclear weapons.

== See also ==
- Presidential exemption
