= 64th Armor Regiment =

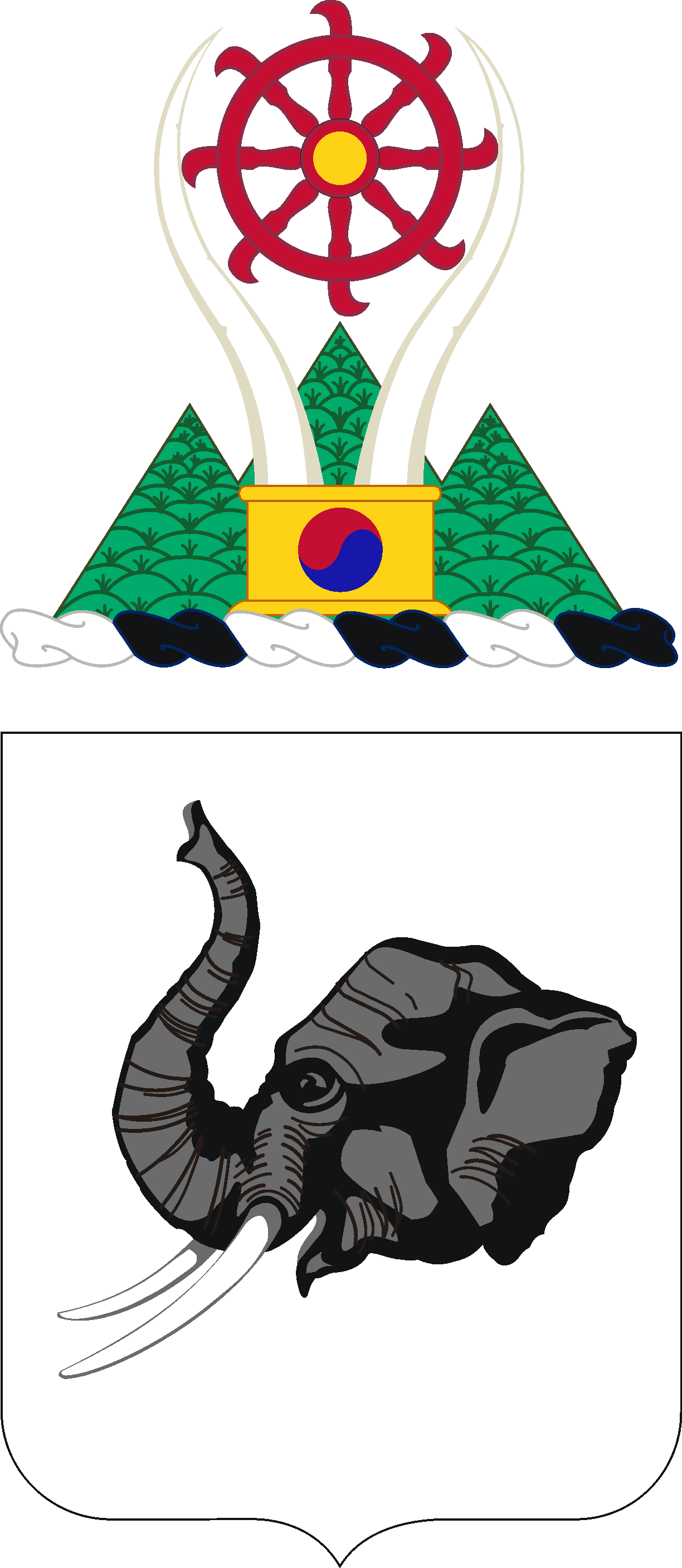
- 64th Armor Regiment Coat of Arms
- Active: 1963-
- Country: USA
- Branch: Regular Army
- Part of: 3rd Infantry Division
- Garrison/HQ: Fort Stewart
- Nickname: Desert Rogues
- Motto: "We Pierce"
- Engagements: World War II; Korean War; Operation Desert Shield; Operation Desert Fox; Operation Iraqi Freedom; Operation Enduring Freedom

The 64th Armor Regiment is an armor regiment of the United States Army, organized under the United States Army Regimental System. It is descended from the 758th, the 1st all African American Tank Battalion (Light) that served in the Italian campaign during World War II. Redesignated as the 64th Tank Battalion, it was assigned to the 3rd Infantry Division during the Korean War and it spent most of the Cold War stationed in West Germany before elements were transferred to Ft. Stewart, Georgia in the late 1990s. The regiment participated in Desert Shield, Desert Storm, Desert Fox, Desert Spring, Operation Iraqi Freedom and Operation Enduring Freedom.

The 64th Armor Regiment's insignia is a black African elephant with two white tusks.

== History ==
The regiment traces its lineage to the 78th Tank Battalion, which was activated on 13 January 1941 at Fort Knox Kentucky. The unit was redesignated the 758th Tank Battalion (Light) on 8 May 1941. The 758th was the first tank battalion in history to accept enlisted Black men. A 758th soldier designed the regimental crest, the rampant head of a black African elephant symbolizing the soldier's pride in their heritage and their unit's mission of mobile armored warfare. Today, every 1-64th Armor soldier wears that same crest, which is prominently displayed on the unit colors with the motto "We Pierce."

The 758th Tank Battalion served with the 92nd Infantry Division in World War II, and was inactivated on 22 September 1945 at Viareggio, Italy. The 758th served with distinction in the Italian campaign of World War II, where it earned the first of the many campaign streamers on the battalion colors.

In 1949, the 758th Tank Battalion was redesignated the 64th Heavy Tank Battalion and assigned to the 2nd Armored Division. In 1950, the 64th Tank Battalion was assigned to the 3rd Infantry Division, and deployed overseas for combat operations during the Korean War. The battalion participated in a total of 8 separate campaigns and fought from the intervention of the Chinese Communist Forces in November 1950 until the Cease-Fire in 1953.

In 1957, the 64th Tank Battalion was inactivated at Ft. Benning, Georgia. In 1963, the 64th Armor Regiment was activated as a parent regiment under the Combined Arms Regimental System. All 4 battalions of the 64th Armor were in Germany for over 30 years of distinguished service. In 1987, the 1st Battalion redeployed from Germany to Fort Stewart, Georgia. 5th Battalion, 32nd Armor was inactivated and its personnel reassigned as 1st Battalion, 64th Armor. Two Battalions of the 64th, the 2nd and 3rd remained in Germany. The 1st Battalion was also the 64th Regimental Headquarters at Fort Stewart, Georgia, its home base.

In 1990, the battalion deployed with the 24th Infantry Division (Mechanized) as part of Operation Desert Shield. During combat operations in Iraq as part of Operation Desert Storm, the battalion spearheaded the division attack against the forces of the Iraqi Republican Guard and advanced over 350 miles in four days. During this action, the unit earned its two campaign streamers: the Defense of Saudi Arabia and the Liberation of Kuwait. Following the successful conclusion of the war, the battalion redeployed to Fort Stewart.

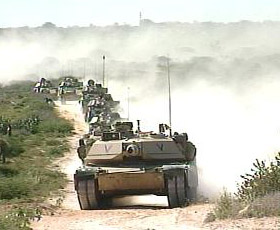
Column of M1A1 Abrams and M2 Bradley of 1-64 Armor in Mogadishu in January 1994

In October 1993, elements of the battalion deployed as part of Task Force 1-64th Armor to protect the United Nations Operation Somalia (UNOSOM) forces deployed to Africa for Operation Continue Hope. The Task Force conducted force security missions in a hostile theater for six months before safely returning all soldiers home in March 1994. In reaction to the shooting-down of US Army Black Hawks in Mogadishu, Somalia between October 5 and 13, 1-64th Armor deployed an immediate reaction force in support of 2-22nd Infantry, part of the 10th Mountain Division, to help suppress further attacks on US personnel. 1,300 men equipped with 18 M1 Abrams tanks and 44 M2 Bradley infantry fighting vehicles were transported by 56 flights of C-5 and C-141.

=== 1st Battalion "Desert Rogues" ===
Following the transformation of the 2nd Brigade Combat Team to the modular force structure, 1st Battalion, 64th Armor is the "Iron Fist" of the 2nd Brigade Combat Team, 3rd Infantry Division (Mechanized).

Elements of 1-64th Armor deployed during 2000-2001 to Bosnia as part of Stabilization Force 8 (SFOR 8).

In September 2002, 1-64th Armor deployed to Kuwait in order to prepare for offensive operations. In March 2003, Task Force 1-64th Armor attacked across the border to liberate Iraq and force a regime change as part of Operation Iraqi Freedom. Task Force 1-64th Armor led the Division into the heart of Baghdad in order to demonstrate American resolve, presence, and destroy the Hussein regime.

In January 2005, 1-64th Armor deployed again to Baghdad, Iraq, where the battalion immediately began combat Operation Tissa Nissan. The actions of the Rogue Soldiers secured the most dangerous routes in Baghdad on a daily basis. The battalion enabled the Iraqis to vote in two elections including the national referendum which provided Iraq with its first democratic government in the country's history.

In 2006, the 2nd Brigade, 3rd Infantry Division Mechanized began transformation to the US Army's new modular force structure. As part of this transformation, 1-64th Armor was reorganized, but remained a part of the reorganized and redesignated 2nd Brigade Combat Team.

The 1-64th Armor deployed in mid-2007 for another tour of duty in Iraq as part of Operation Iraqi Freedom. The unit remained in that country into 2008, while returning in 2009 to 2010 in the Mosul region.

In March 2012, the 1-64th Armor deployed to Kandahar Province, Afghanistan in support of Operation Enduring Freedom XII. The unit was a part of Task Force Arrowhead and remained in Afghanistan until December 2012. While in Afghanistan, the battalion was given the mission to reduce rocket fire on Kandahar Air Field, commonly referred to as KAF, and through coordination with the Air Force, Romanian military, intelligence gathering units, and fixed and rotary-wing aviation personnel, they were able to address the problem and decrease rocket attacks by 70 percent. Bayonet and Cyclone Companies were attached to 1st Battalion 23rd Infantry Regiment (Fort Lewis, WA) and operated in the volatile Panjwai District of Kandahar. They executed interdiction missions, tasked with interrupting the flow of weapons and insurgents into the Kandahar City area with the goal of preventing spectacular attacks on Kandahar City. By working with Military Working Dog teams, Explosive Ordnance Disposal Teams, Special Operations Forces, and Close Combat Air assets, Bayonet and Cyclone Companies were able to disrupt the core of the Taliban network in the South. This prevented any spectacular attacks from occurring and inflicted unsustainable casualties on Taliban forces.

=== 2nd Battalion (Rogue) ===
Following the Korean War, the 64th Heavy Tank Battalion was reorganized as the 64th Armor Regiment, a parent regiment under the Combined Arms Regimental System. The 2nd Battalion, 64th Armor was born at this time, and with its three sister battalions, helped to preserve freedom's frontier in the Federal Republic of Germany. The 2nd Battalion, commonly written as 2–64 Armor, was finally assigned to the 1st Brigade, 3rd Infantry Division at Conn Barracks in Schweinfurt, Germany. It remained there 33 years until the inactivation ceremony of 5 April 1996. It was the second armored unit to receive the M1 Abrams tank. During its tenure in Germany, companies of the Rogue Battalion performed numerous REFORGERs (Return of Forces to Germany), Winter Warriors, border missions, were selected as the United States' representatives for NATO's Armor Competition, the Canadian Army Trophy (CAT) in 1989 and participated in Peace Keeper 95. In February 1991, three platoons selected from 2-64 Armor deployed in support of Desert Storm as Weapon System Replacement Operation (WSRO) units, intended to replace anticipated losses with trained and integrated crews rather than individual replacements. These Rogues assisted with various rear area security operations.

=== 3rd Battalion (Rampage) ===
Following the Korean War, the 64th Heavy Tank Battalion was reorganized as the 64th Armor Regiment, a parent regiment under the Combined Arms Regimental System. The 3d Battalion, 64th Armor was born at this time, and with its three sister battalions, helped to preserve freedom's frontier in the Federal Republic of Germany. The 3rd Battalion, commonly written as 3–64 Armor, was finally assigned to the 1st Brigade, 3rd Infantry Division, at Conn Barracks in Schweinfurt, Germany. It remained there for 30 years until the inactivation ceremony of 17 December 1993. It was the first armored unit to receive the M-1 Abrams tank in USAEUR. During its tenure in Germany, companies of the Rampage Battalion performed numerous REFORGERs (Return of Forces to Germany), Winter Warriors, border missions and were selected as the United States representatives for NATO's Armor Competition, the Canadian Army Trophy (CAT) in 1983, 1985, and 1987.

In November 1990 select units of the 3rd battalion were called into action and attached to the 1st Armored Division in Saudi Arabia as part of the Desert Shield/Desert Storm Allied Coalition.

=== 4th Battalion (Tuskers) ===
==== Gulf War ====
For over 50 years, the 64th Armor Regiment served with distinction in World War II, Korea, Germany, and the United States. While assigned to the 24th Infantry Division, the 1st and 4th Battalions distinguished themselves in the defense of Saudi Arabia during Desert Shield, and in combat operations in Iraq during Desert Storm. Following the Iraqi invasion of Kuwait in 1990, 4-64th Armor was one of the first battalions deployed to defend the Kingdom of Saudi Arabia as part of Operation Desert Shield. The battalion attacked six months later, spearheading the 24th Infantry Division's "Left Hook" into Iraq to destroy elements of the 26th Command Brigade and the Republican Guard Hammurabi Division as part of Operation Desert Storm. Their speed and forcefulness helped force an Iraqi retreat and surrender.

In August 1990, the battalion deployed to Saudi Arabia attached to the 24th Infantry Division (Mechanized), in support of Operation Desert Storm. Throughout the 1990s, the battalion was deployed to Bosnia, and conducted numerous rotations through the National Training Center at Fort Irwin, CA. (Note that an earlier entry stated deployment to Kuwait in 1991. This is incorrect, the 4th Bn never entered Kuwait, even after combat operations.)

In August 1998, the battalion deployed in support of intrinsic action 98-03 as Task Force Tusker to Kuwait. The task force was tasked with defending Kuwait as part of Operation Desert Fox in December 1998, which extended their deployment.

==== OIF 1 ====
In 2002, the battalion deployed with 2nd Brigade, 3rd Infantry Division to Kuwait for Operation Desert Spring. As one of the most acclimated units to a desert environment, 4–64 led the Third Infantry Division into Iraq for Operation Iraqi Freedom in March 2003. The Tuskers were the second unit into the International Zone of Baghdad in April 2003, following Task Force 1-64AR on the second "Thunder Run" (7 April 2003). In June 2003, the unit moved to Habanyiah, Iraq (between Fallujah and Ramadi in Al-Anbar province), and provided security there before redeploying to Fort Stewart in August 2003.

==== OIF 3 ====
In 2004, the Tuskers were reassigned to the new 4th Brigade, 3rd Infantry Division. They transitioned from a four-company to a seven-company structure, exchanging the former Bravo Company (Armor) to 3–7 Infantry, gaining Bravo 3–7 Infantry and B-10 Engineer, redesignating Alpha Company (Armor) as Delta Company (Armor), and dividing HHC into an FSC and HHC. In November 2004, 4–64 Armor deployed to the Joint Readiness Training Center for the first time, to prepare for a second deployment to Iraq.

The battalion's second deployment was to FOB Prosperity in the International Zone of Baghdad. The unit had responsibility for all security within the International Zone, and certain neighborhoods in the vicinity. C Co was cross attached to 1/184th IN (AA) at FOB Falcon. They were responsible for one of the worst sectors in Iraq at the time. C Co suffered many losses and injured soldiers but managed to reduce the insurgent threat. The battalion redeployed to the US in January 2006.

==== OIF 5 ====
In October 2007 the battalion deployed once again to Iraq. During this deployment the battalion was positioned at FOB Falcon, Baghdad, Iraq. The battalion had the daunting task of clearing and securing the greater portion of West Rashid in southwest Baghdad.

==== Deactivation ====
In March 2009, the battalion was deactivated and re-flagged as 3rd Battalion, 15th Infantry Regiment as the 4th Brigade Combat Team was reorganised from a Heavy Brigade Combat Team (HBCT) to an Infantry Brigade Combat Team (IBCT). It was reactivated in 1st Armor Brigade Combat Team (ABCT), 3rd Infantry Division.
