= Gnaedinger =

Gnaedinger is a surname. Notable people with the surname include:

- Angelo Gnaedinger (born 1951), Director-General of the International Committee of the Red Cross
- Mary Gnaedinger (1897–1976), American magazine editor

== See also ==
- Gnädinger (disambiguation)
