= Federico Villegas =

Federico Villegas may refer to:

- Federico Villegas (BMX rider)
- Federico Villegas (diplomat)
