= Prosecutor of the International Criminal Court =

Office within the International Criminal Court

- Incumbent; Vacant since 24 July 2026
- Office of the Prosecutor
- Appointer: Assembly of States Parties
- Term length: 9 years 1 term - nonrenewable
- Constituting instrument: Rome Statute
- Inaugural holder: Luis Moreno Ocampo
- Formation: 21 April 2003
- Deputy: Deputy Prosecutor of the International Criminal Court
- Website: icc-cpi.int/about/otp

The prosecutor of the International Criminal Court is the officer of the International Criminal Court (ICC), whose duties include the investigation and prosecution of the crimes under the jurisdiction of the ICC, namely genocide, crimes against humanity and war crimes as well as the crime of aggression. The prosecutor heads the Office of the Prosecutor (OTP).

The position of Prosecutor of the ICC is currently vacant following the removal of Karim Ahmad Khan, KC, who served as Prosecutor from 16 June 2021 until 24 July 2026, when he was sacked by the Assembly of States Parties following a vote.

== List of prosecutors of the International Criminal Court ==
Prosecutors of the International Criminal Court
Name	Portrait	Country	Deputies	Elected	Term commenced	Term end
Luis Moreno Ocampo		Argentina	Fatou Bensouda; Serge Brammertz	21 April 2003	16 June 2003	15 June 2012
Fatou Bensouda		Gambia	James Stewart	12 December 2011	16 June 2012	15 June 2021
Karim Ahmad Khan, KC		United Kingdom	Mame Mandiaye Niang; Nazhat Shameem Khan	12 February 2021	16 June 2021	24 July 2026

== Elections of the prosecutor ==
The first election of the prosecutor took place on 21 April 2003, during the second resumption of the first session of the Assembly of States Parties in New York. The only official candidate was Luis Moreno Ocampo. Moreno Ocampo was elected with 78 votes with no votes against and no abstentions. Nine states parties did not vote.

The second election of the prosecutor took place during the tenth session of the Assembly of States Parties in New York on 12 December 2011. A Search Committee was established which received 52 communications regarding a new prosecutor. In the end, the states parties achieved consensus to elect the then-deputy prosecutor, Fatou Bensouda, as the new prosecutor. She was elected by acclamation.

The third election of the prosecutor took place during the second resumed nineteenth session of the Assembly of States Parties in New York on 12 February 2021. In its first ballot, Karim Ahmad Khan, QC received 59 votes, Fergal Gaynor (Ireland) 47, Carlos Castresana Fernández (Spain) 12, and Francesco Lo Voi (Italy) 5. In its second ballot, Karim Khan was elected with 72 votes, surpassing the majority requirement of 62. Fergal Gaynor received 42 votes, Carlos Castresana Fernández 5, and Francesco Lo Voi 3.
