= Nicholas Kaufman =

British-Israeli international defense lawyer

- ניקולס קאופמן
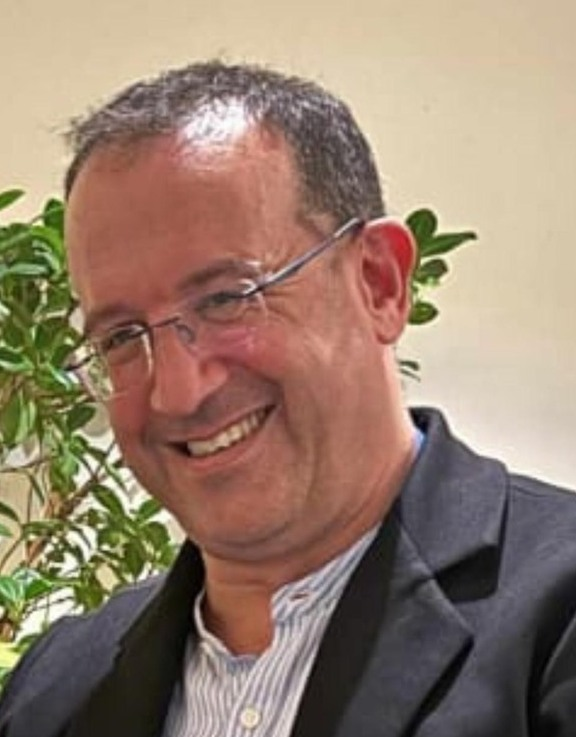
- Kaufman in 2025
- Born: 1967 or 1968 (age 57–58); Liverpool, United Kingdom
- Education: University of Cambridge
- Occupation: Lawyer
- Known for: International Criminal Court defense attorney

Nicholas Kaufman (Hebrew: ניקולס קאופמן) is a British-Israeli lawyer, specialising in international criminal law, who has served as a defense attorney at the International Criminal Court.

== Early life and education ==
Kaufman was born in Liverpool in the United Kingdom to a Jewish family and grew up in Birmingham. He obtained his law degree from the University of Cambridge in 1989. He also studied at the Inns of Court School of Law in 1991.

== Career ==
=== Early career ===
After graduating from Cambridge, Kaufman worked as a defence lawyer in Birmingham before moving to Israel. He served in the Military Advocate General’s Office of the Israel Defense Forces. He worked on peace agreements and international law.

Kaufman went on to work in a Tel Aviv law firm focusing on corporate law before transitioning to criminal law in 1996 by becoming a prosecutor in the Jerusalem District Attorney's Office. He was instructed in cases of murder, rape, and terrorism.

=== International Criminal Tribunal for the former Yugoslavia ===
Kaufman joined the International Criminal Tribunal for the former Yugoslavia in 2003 becoming Israel's first prosecutor in said court. He helped secure the conviction of Serbian and Montenegrin generals for war crimes committed in attacking Dubrovnik in 1991.

=== International Criminal Court ===
Kaufman also served as a defense lawyer at the International Criminal Court. His clients include Democratic Republic of the Congo vice president Jean-Pierre Bemba; Ayesha, the daughter of Libyan leader Muammar Gaddafi; and a militia leader from the Central African Republic Mokom Gawaka. His representation with Gawaka ended due to a conflict of interest.

Commenting on the US administration’s lifting of sanctions imposed on the outgoing ICC prosecutor Fatou Bensouda, Kaufman emphasized to Israeli Army Radio that it was not possible bribe the new ICC prosecutor, Karim Khan. This came at a time when the ICC was launching an investigation into Israeli crimes in the West Bank, Gaza Strip and East Jerusalem.

==== Rodrigo Duterte ====
Kaufman defended former Philippine president Rodrigo Duterte at the ICC, who has begun to go on trial in relation to the ongoing investigation in the Philippines regarding Philippine drug war in his presidential tenure. He maintained that Duterte's detention is illegal and has campaigned for the return of his client to the Philippines. He sought for the interim release of Duterte, claiming that his client is not fit to stand trial. He also alleged the Duterte's successor, Bongbong Marcos is using the trial to undermine Duterte's legacy. Neri Colmenares, another lawyer supporting the relatives of those killed in the drug war, describes Kaufman's statements as populist and caters to the supporters of Duterte.

On 8 May 2026, Kaufman requested the ICC to remove him as Duterte's lawyer as part of a restructuring of the legal team. The proposed replacement of Kaufman is a close associate of Kaufman whose identity was not yet disclosed. On 11 May 2026, the ICC granted the request for Kaufman's withdrawal.

== Personal life ==
Kaufman immigrated to the state of Israel in 1993 at age 25. He married an Israeli woman.
