= Centre for Humanitarian Dialogue =

Peace organisation

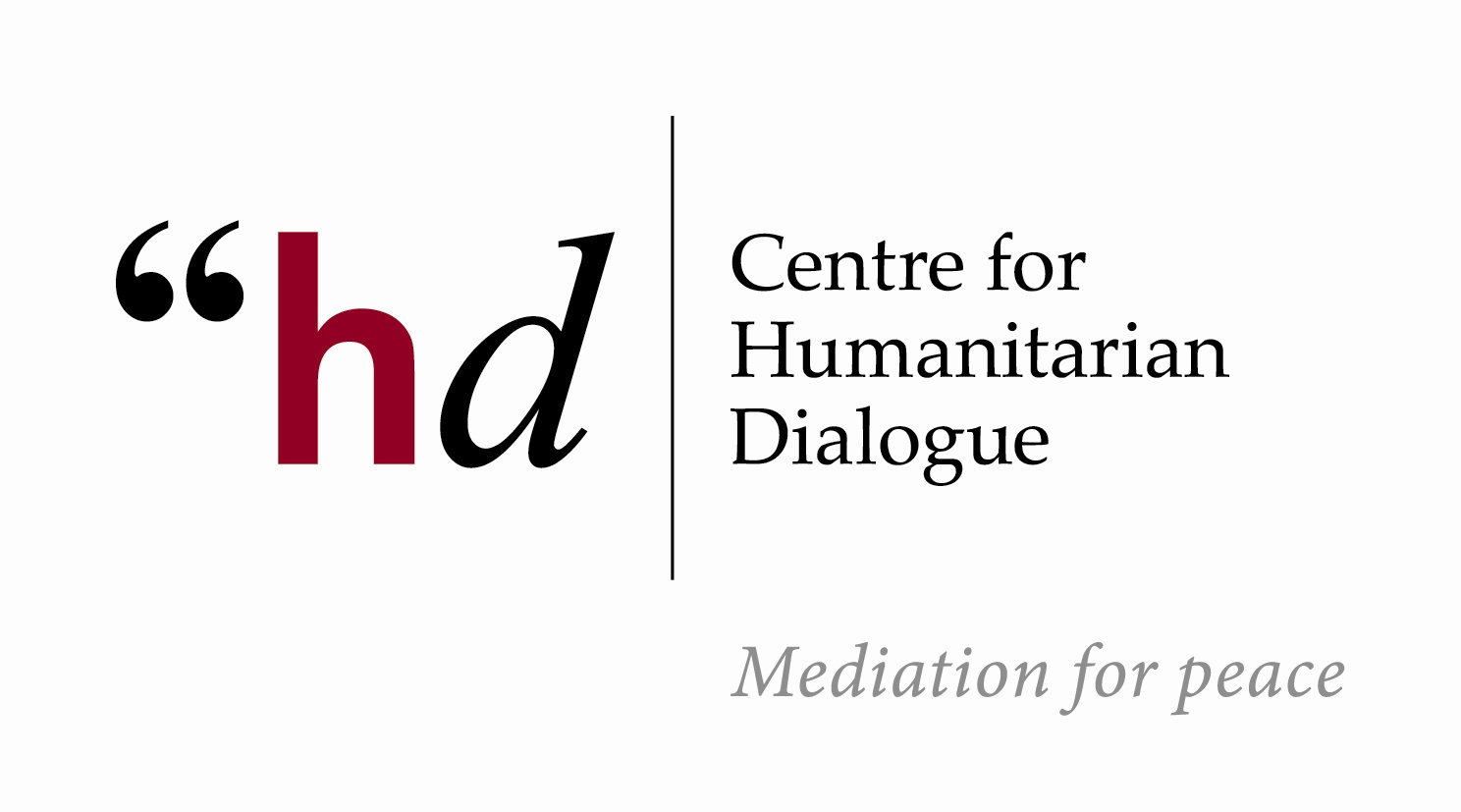
- Formation: August 1999
- Type: Non-governmental organization
- Purpose: Conflict prevention and resolution
- Headquarters: Geneva, Switzerland
- Executive Director: David Harland
- Website: www.hdcentre.org

The Centre for Humanitarian Dialogue (HD), otherwise known as the Henry Dunant Centre for Humanitarian Dialogue, works to prevent and resolve armed conflicts around the world through mediation and discreet diplomacy. A non-profit organisation based in Switzerland, HD was founded in 1999 on the principles of humanity, impartiality and independence. HD is supervised by an independent board, regularly reports to donors and undergoes financial audits every year.

HD was awarded the Carnegie Wateler Peace Prize for 2022 "for its track record of finding the means, including mediation, to bring parties together and end conflicts”.

== Activities ==
HD runs multi-track mediation and peacemaking projects in Africa, the Middle East, Eurasia, Asia and Latin America. HD engages with political actors, armed groups and other influential parties at international, inter-state, country and local levels while supporting communities and marginalised groups to play active roles in peace processes.

It also works with the United Nations, regional organisations, governments, civil society groups and other partners to mediate between conflict parties, support peace negotiations and strengthen the mediation efforts of others.

HD supports humanitarian efforts by helping to secure the safe passage of aid and health services in high-risk areas and in recent years has expanded its thematic expertise to support its operations to effectively deal with climate and environmental, gender-responsive and inclusive, organised crime and ceasefires issues that intensify and complicate conflicts across regions.

To reflect the impact of AI and emerging technologies, information operations on social media and sophisticated cyber attacks on conflict, HD has a dedicated Digital Conflict directorate that supports peace processes and pursues multilateral engagement with policymakers, technology platforms and the mediation community.

HD's Mediation support team conducts research and analysis, producing best practice and guidance tools and reports to improve its operational work and to further international mediation and peacemaking efforts.

HD seeks to promote the sharing of experience and knowledge by co-hosting The Oslo Forum with the Norwegian Ministry of Foreign Affairs. Launched in 2003, the Forum is a series of retreats for the international mediation and peacemaking community to reflect on current practices, work on new approaches and advance their negotiations.

In April 2023, HD commended His Excellency Olusegun Obasanjo for his mediation for peace in Ethiopia's Tigray region by presenting the Nigerian former president with a special letter and certificate from HD's Board.

== Selected projects ==
Indonesia: In its first mediation project soon after its founding in 1999, HD laid the groundwork for the successful negotiation of a final peace agreement in 2005 between the Indonesian government and GAM separatist rebels in the province of Aceh.

Spain: For 15 years, HD discreetly helped to resolve decades of violence, ending with the Basque armed group ETA disbanding. ETA's final declaration was made public at HD headquarters on 3 May 2018.

Black Sea Grain Initiative: During talks between Russia and Ukraine to restart the flow of vital food shipments, HD provided advice and close support to the process led by the United Nations and Türkiye. In July 2025, HD's Eurasia Director, David Gorman, gave an interview with German newspaper Die Zeit highlighting some of the challenges for both sides and his perspectives as a mediator.

Sahel: In a region faced with political instability, jihadist attacks and conflict over water and land, HD continues to broker various agreements around the sharing of natural resources and set up a network of mediators across Mali, Niger, Burkina Faso, Mauritania and Chad.

Nigeria: HD is convening dialogue among various groups to address conflicts over land, water and political power in Middle Belt states. In 2021, HD secured the first social media peace accord between communities in conflict and has since achieved a peace agreement based on the sharing of natural resources.

Libya: As part of its support for the peace process in Libya, HD brokered an immediate ceasefire in August 2020 and an agreement among major Libyan stakeholders to recommit to political talks. This led to a formal ceasefire and UN-brokered political deal with a new interim government, a roadmap for elections and substantial women's representation in the future cabinet.

Philippines: Since 2004, HD has helped efforts to end the conflict in the southern Philippines, including support for successful peace talks in 2014 and ratification of the law establishing the Bangsamoro Autonomous Region in Muslim Mindanao, along with community dialogue sessions and training of mediators.

South China Sea: HD convened two tracks of dialogue – on preventing violent escalation between coastguards and on avoiding a collapse in fish stocks. These resulted in operational principles to prevent incidents at sea and in scientific consensus on fisheries management between China, Vietnam, Malaysia, Indonesia and the Philippines.

Senegal: In Africa's oldest insurgency, HD has been working since 2014 to create an inclusive and legitimate negotiating platform between the government of Senegal and the Movement of Democratic Forces of Casamance (MFDC). Under the auspices of Guinea-Bissau President Umaro Sissoco Embaló and with the support of HD, the government of Senegal and the southern factions of the MFDC signed a roadmap for disarmament on 4 August 2022 .

Colombia: HD works in Colombia to mitigate against the impact of organised crime. In 2025, armed gangs in Quibdó city agreed to a permanent cessation of hostilities drawn up with HD support, paving the way for violence reduction. HD received an official mandate to facilitate peace dialogue between three cities and criminal armed groups building on its advisory support to reduce the number of deaths caused by the conflict.

Among its various public and confidential peacemaking activities, HD has also worked in Ethiopia Sudan, Syria, Kenya, the Central African Republic, Liberia, Somalia, Timor Leste, Burundi and Nepal.

== History and leadership ==
HD was founded to pursue the humanitarian vision of Henry Dunant, co-founder of the Red Cross and co-recipient of the first Nobel Peace Prize, by using mediation and dialogue to reduce the suffering caused by armed conflict. The initial intention of HD was to serve as a discreet venue for dialogue on humanitarian issues.

The organisation evolved to include negotiations in support of humanitarian objectives and quickly broadened, at the behest of conflict parties in Aceh, to include the resolution of the conflict through mediation and conflict prevention.

In July 2015, HD was granted a special status by the Federal Council of Switzerland that confers certain privileges and immunities intended to enable its peacemaking efforts worldwide.

Martin Griffiths was the founding executive director of HD and led the organisation from 1999 to July 2010. He was replaced for a brief period (July 2010 to March 2011) by Angelo Gnaedinger, then HD's regional director for the Middle East and a former director general of the International Committee of the Red Cross.

David Harland, a former New Zealand diplomat and UN official, was appointed as HD's executive director in April 2011.

== Funding ==
HD receives a combination of strategic support and targeted project funding from various governments and private foundations.

In 2024, HD's annual income was 47 million Swiss francs.
