= Bangui National Forum =

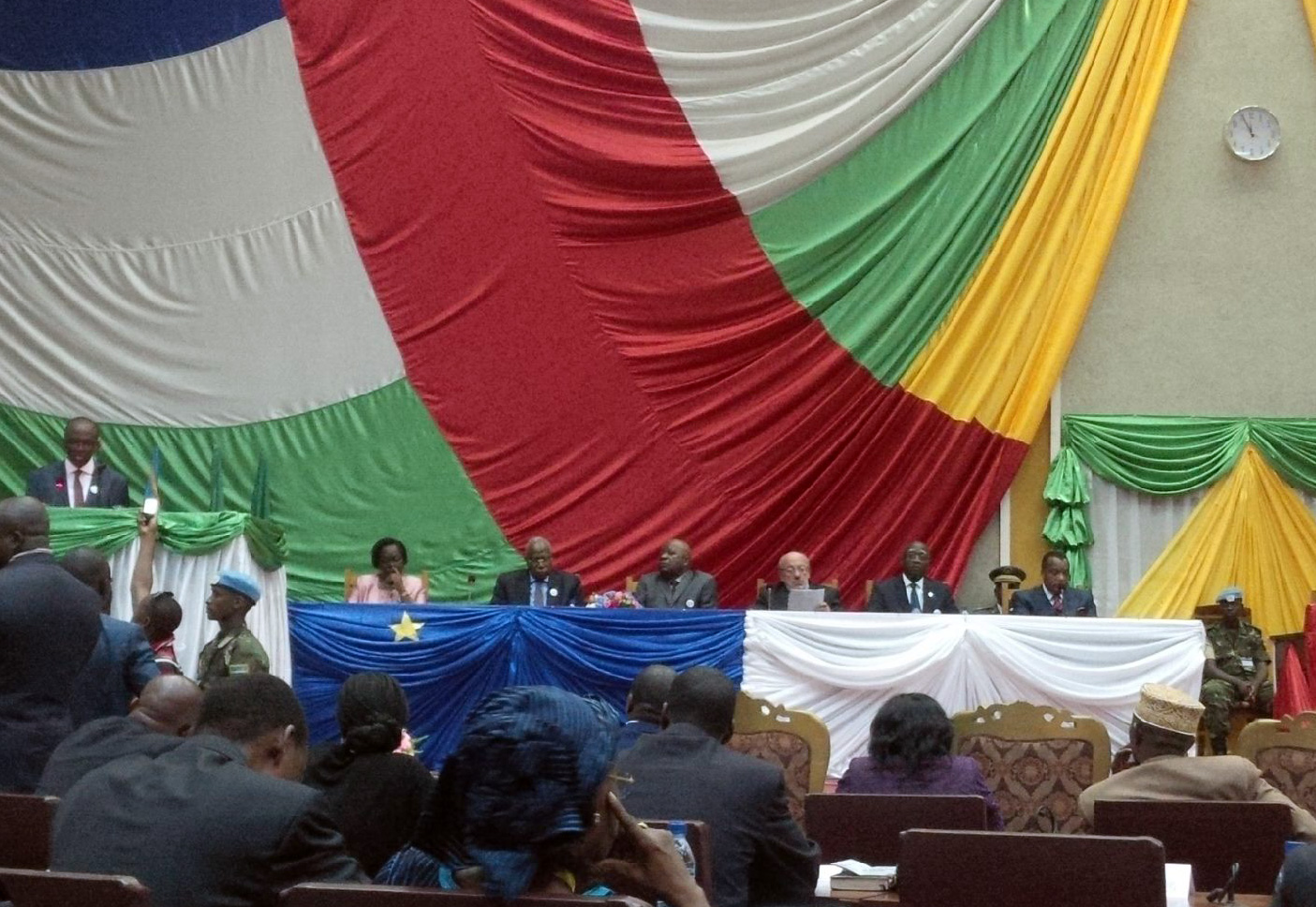
Closing ceremony of the Bangui National Forum on 11 May 2015.

The Bangui National Forum was a national reconciliation conference organized by the transition government of the Central African Republic (CAR), seek a diplomatic resolution to the ongoing civil war in the Central African Republic, which by that point had been raging for over a decade. The peace conference took place in Bangui from May 4th to May 11th, 2015.

The Bangui National Forum represented the third phase of the Brazzaville Process, which sought to end hostilities in the country. The peace process began with the Brazzaville ceasefire conference of July 2014 and the CAR popular consultations during the first quarter of 2015. The forum resulted in the adoption of a Republican Pact for Peace, National Reconciliation and Reconstruction in the CAR and the signing of a Disarmament, Demobilisation, Rehabilitation and Repatriation (DDRR) agreement by 9 of 10 armed groups involved in the conflict.

The Forum was presided over by Professor Abdoulaye Bathily, Special Representative of the United Nations Secretary-General for Central Africa. More than 600 participants represented the government, civil society, political parties, the media, the Central African diaspora, and faith-based organisations.

== Purpose ==
The purpose of the Bangui National Forum was to bring together Central Africans from all regions and backgrounds to find lasting solutions to years of recurrent political instability in the country.

The latest episode of conflict broke out in December 2012, when an armed rebellion was launched by the Séléka Coalition, led by Michel Djotodia, a former defence minister. By March 2013, the Séléka Coalition successfully overthrew the government of François Bozizé. However, the takeover by the Séléka Coalition did not end the violence, especially in regards to the sectarian conflict between the pro-Muslim Séléka Coalition and the predominantly Christian anti-Balaka militias.

Driven by the deteriorating security and human rights situation in the country, the regional governments launched several peace initiatives. This included a Summit of the Economic Community of Central African States (ECCAS) leaders, which took place in Malabo, Equatorial Guinea alongside the 23rd Ordinary Summit of the African Union in June 2014. The ECCAS leaders agreed to establish a three-phase plan to bring peace to the country, including a ceasefire conference in Brazzaville in July 2014, popular consultations and the Bangui National Forum.

The initial idea for the Bangui Forum stemmed from a workshop organized by the Centre for Humanitarian Dialogue (HD) in June 2014, that had gathered 30 Central African participants from varying backgrounds to analyse and openly discuss the sources of contention which had led to the outbreak of violence. This initiative was the first to be held after the 2013 episodes of violence in CAR.

== Recommendations ==
The recommendations resulting from the popular consultations held in early 2015 were compiled into four thematic reports and were put forward for debate at the Forum in four thematic sub-committees (Peace and security, Justice and Reconciliation, Governance, and Economic and Social Development) and at plenary sessions.

The deliberations benefited from the technical support of foreign expertise provided by international organizations. These included the United Nations Multidimensional Integrated Stabilization Mission in the Central African Republic (MINUSCA), the Centre for Humanitarian Dialogue (HD), the Organisation Internationale de la Francophonie, ECCAS and the African Union (AU).

Among others, the following recommendations were adopted during the forum:

- The disarmament and reintegration or reinsertion of armed groups
- Reform of the security sector
- The creation of a special tribunal to try persons suspected of committing war crimes and crimes against humanity
- Creation of a peace, reconciliation and reparation commission
- Revision of the nationality code
- Recognition of two Muslim feasts
- Redeployment of administrative services across the country
- Investment in infrastructure, education and health
- Reform of the judiciary and improved transparency in the management of the country's abundant natural resources.
- Return and reintegration of refugees and IDPs

The delegates also agreed on the extension of the mandate of the transitional government in order to provide adequate time for the planning of fair elections.

== Agreements ==
The recommendations issuing from the Bangui Forum are contained in a Republican Pact for Peace, National Reconciliation and Reconstruction in the Central African Republic, which was adopted at the end of the Forum. The Pact calls for the immediate implementation of the resolutions of the Forum and for the commitment of the candidates in the upcoming presidential elections to uphold them.

To address concerns that the outcomes of the Bangui Forum might not be fully implemented, the President of the Central African Republic, Catherine Samba-Panza announced in her closing address that a monitoring committee would oversee the full implementation.

A disarmament, demobilization, reintegration and repatriation of ex-combatants (DDRR) was also signed at the end of the Forum by nine out of ten armed groups: the Front Populaire pour la Renaissance de la Centrafrique (FRPC), the Rassemblement Patriotique pour le Renouveau de la Centrafrique (RPRC), the Union des Forces Républicaines Fondamentales (UFRF), the Seleka Rénovée, the Mouvement des Libérateurs Centrafricains pour la Justice (MLCJ), the Coordination des ex-combattants Anti-Balaka, The Unité du Peuple Centrafricain (UPC), Révolution et Justice, and Unité des Forces Républicaines. The Front Démocratique pour le Progrès de la Centrafrique (FDPC) did not sign the agreement.

The DDRR agreement outlines that ex-combatants should be relocated to designated camps for identification and awareness sessions. They will be either integrated into the security agencies under the National DDRR Programme; returned to their communities and included in various income-generating programmes funded by MINUSCA and the United Nations Development Programme (UNDP) and other international partners; or in the case of foreign fighters, not suspected of committing war crimes, they will be repatriated to their home countries. The agreement was well received by national and international public opinion as a milestone in the search for peace in the country.

A contributing factor to the achievement of the Bangui Forum and of the DDRR agreement was the signing of peace declarations in Nairobi by former presidents Bozizé and Djotodia in April 2015. In a surprise move, both men agreed to recognize the recommendations of the Brazzaville ceasefire conference of July 2014 and to support the Bangui Forum. This enabled representatives of the two main armed groups, the Séléka and Anti-Balaka, to participate at the forum and for security to be respected during the week that it was held.

A declaration by armed groups to stop enrolling children into their ranks and to release those already in their possession was also signed on the margins of the Forum. UNICEF reported the release of 357 children by these groups one week after signature.
