= Karim Ahmad Khan =

British lawyer and prosecutor (born 1970)

Karim Ahmad Khan KC
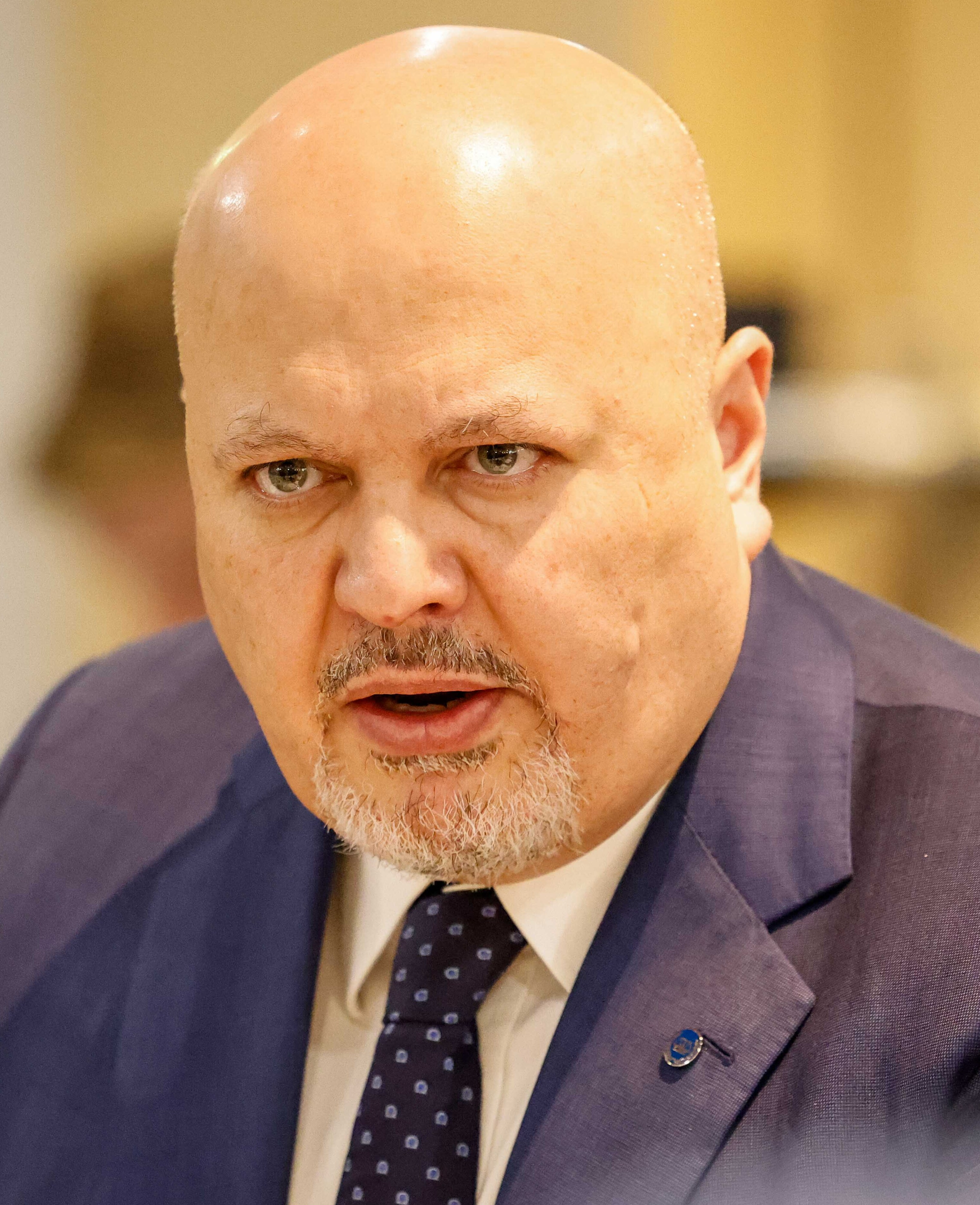
- Khan in April 2022

Prosecutor of the International Criminal Court
- In office 16 June 2021 – 24 July 2026; On leave: 16 May 2025 – 8 June 2026; Suspended: 8 June 2026 – 24 July 2026
- President: Piotr Hofmański; Tomoko Akane
- Deputy: Mame Mandiaye Niang; Nazhat Shameem
- Preceded by: Fatou Bensouda
- Succeeded by: TBD

Personal details
- Born: Karim Asad Ahmad Khan; 30 March 1970 (age 56) Edinburgh, Scotland
- Spouse: Shyamala Alagendra
- Children: 2
- Relatives: Imran Ahmad Khan (brother)
- Education: King's College London (LLB, AKC); Wolfson College, Oxford (attended)

Karim Asad Ahmad Khan (born 30 March 1970) is a British lawyer who served as Prosecutor of the International Criminal Court (ICC) from 2021 to 2026. He specialises in international criminal law and international human rights law.

On 20 May 2024, Khan announced the ICC's decision to apply for arrest warrants for Israeli prime minister Benjamin Netanyahu, Israeli defence minister Yoav Gallant, and Hamas leaders Yahya Sinwar, Mohammed Deif, and Ismail Haniyeh for alleged war crimes and crimes against humanity. In November 2024, the ICC issued an arrest warrant for Netanyahu, along with Gallant and Deif. (Note: Sinwar and Haniyeh had been confirmed as dead by the time of this decision, but Deif had not.) An arrest warrant against Myanmar military junta leader, Min Aung Hlaing, was also requested the same month. In February 2025, the United States Department of the Treasury imposed sanctions on Khan after US president Donald Trump sanctioned ICC officials for issuing arrest warrants against Netanyahu and Gallant for alleged war crimes in Gaza. The US sanctions resulted in Microsoft blocking Khan's access to his official email account, prompting the ICC to transfer their digital system to an open-source alternative. Microsoft said it did not stop or suspend its services to the ICC.

Khan voluntarily stepped down as chief prosecutor in May 2025 due to allegations of sexual misconduct and he was suspended pending a vote on sexual misconduct allegations in June 2026. In July 2026, Khan was ousted as chief prosecutor after 82 of the 125 ICC member states voted in favour of his dismissal.

== Early life ==
Karim Ahmad Khan was born in Edinburgh on 30 March 1970, the son of a British nurse and Pakistani dermatologist. His father was born in Mardan. He has a sister and two brothers, one of whom is former Conservative Party MP and convicted sex offender Imran Ahmad Khan. Khan attended Silcoates School in Wrenthorpe, then earned an LLB and AKC from King's College London. He was called to the Bar of England and Wales by Lincoln's Inn in 1992. He later completed some studies toward a DPhil in law at Wolfson College, Oxford, but did not finish the degree.

== Career ==
From 1993 to 1996, Khan was a Crown Prosecutor at the Crown Prosecution Service of England and Wales, having been appointed a Senior Crown Prosecutor in 1995. Between 1996 and 1997, he was a member of staff at the Law Commission of England and Wales. From 1997 to 1998, he worked as a Legal Officer at the Office of the Prosecutor at the International Criminal Tribunal for the former Yugoslavia (ICTY). He later served as Legal Adviser at the Office of the Prosecutor at the International Criminal Tribunal for Rwanda (ICTR) until 2000. From 2006 to 2007, he was lead defence counsel to former President of Liberia Charles Taylor before the Special Court for Sierra Leone (SCSL).

Khan spent several years engaged in leading cases at the International Criminal Court (ICC), the International Criminal Tribunal for the former Yugoslavia, the International Criminal Tribunal for Rwanda, the Extraordinary Chambers in the Courts of Cambodia (ECCC), and the Special Tribunal for Lebanon (STL). In 2008, he was appointed Lead Counsel to former Le Monde journalist Florence Hartmann, who had served as chief spokesperson to ICTY and ICTR prosecutor Carla del Ponte, when she was charged with contempt of court. Between 2008 and 2010, he was engaged as Lead Counsel before the ICC representing Sudanese rebel leader Bahr Idriss Abu Garda, the first ICC suspect to voluntarily surrender to the jurisdiction of the Court.

Khan was appointed Queen's Counsel in 2011. In January 2011, he was instructed as Lead Counsel to represent Francis Muthaura before the ICC in relation to the post-election violence in 2007–2008. He later served as Lead Counsel for Deputy President of Kenya William Ruto before the ICC, and Lead Counsel for Deputy Prime Minister of Kosovo Fatmir Limaj before the EULEX Court in Kosovo from 2014 until 2017. He also served as the Lead Counsel for Saif al-Islam Gaddafi and Baghdadi Mahmudi at the ICC.

Khan represented a group of Anglophone human rights lawyers charged with terrorism and other offences before the Military Court in Yaoundé, Cameroon, as international counsel from February 2017 until September 2017. He led the team that advised Cham and Albanian communities in relation to their expulsion from Greece, and subsequent expropriation of property after the Second World War. He was lead counsel for a large victims case in Sierra Leone arising out of the ECOMOG intervention in 1999–2002. Also in 2017, he represented more than 100,000 victim claimants from the Kipsigi and Talai communities in Kenya seeking redress for alleged human rights violations committed during British colonial rule. Khan said: "Certain historical injustices need to be recognised... It's something that I feel very passionately about and it's really worthwhile."

Khan served until 2018 as a member of the executive council and the victims committee of the International Criminal Court Bar Association (ICCBA), and he was the president of the ICCBA from June 2017 to June 2018. At the end of his tenure, Khan was appointed the first honorary president of the ICCBA.

Until June 2021, Khan was based in Baghdad, and served as Special Adviser and Head of the United Nations Investigative Team for the Promotion of Accountability for Crimes Committed by Da'esh/ISIL in Iraq (UNITAD), established pursuant to Security Council resolution 2379 (2017). Khan led the team in achieving its mandate in the collection, storage, and preservation of evidence related to crimes committed by Da'esh/ISIL; the promotion throughout the world of accountability for the crimes committed by Da'esh/ISIL; to work with survivors in recognition of their interest in the achievement of accountability for crimes to which they have been subjected; to respect the sovereignty of the Government of Iraq in performing this investigation. Khan met with government, religious, and community leadership across Iraq as part of his mandate at UNITAD.

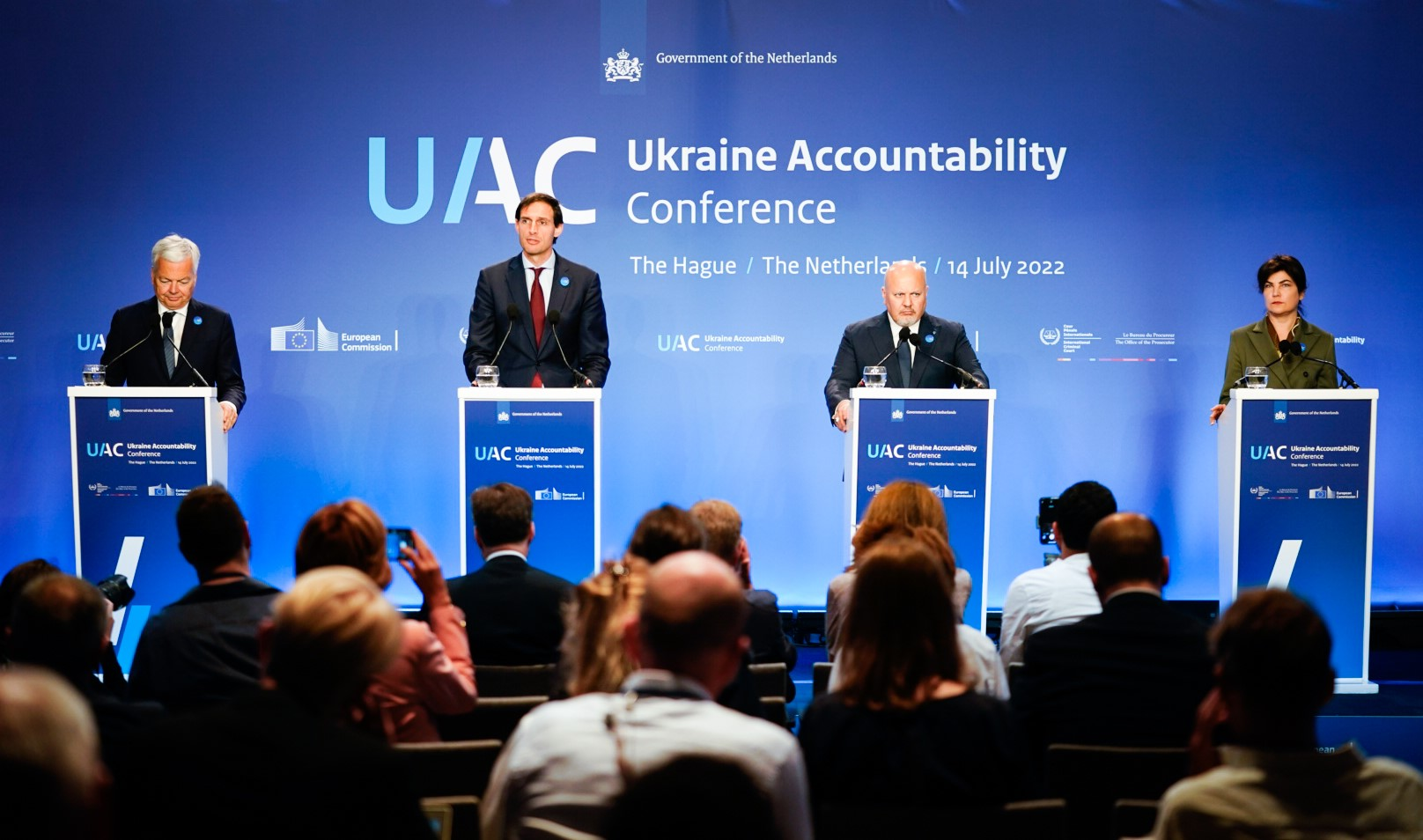
European Commissioner for Justice Didier Reynders, Dutch Foreign Minister Wopke Hoekstra, Khan, and Ukraine's Prosecutor General Iryna Venediktova in The Hague, Netherlands, 22 July 2022

=== Chief prosecutor of International Criminal Court ===
On 12 February 2021, Khan was elected chief prosecutor of the International Criminal Court for a nine-year term in the second round of voting, receiving votes from 72 out of 123 member states (62 needed). Khan was the third chief prosecutor elected in the ICC's history, and the first one elected by secret ballot. Khan had been nominated by the United Kingdom. He took office in June 2021, replacing the Gambian lawyer Fatou Bensouda.

In September 2021, Khan resumed the investigation into crimes committed by the Taliban and the Islamic State in Khorassan in Afghanistan which had been suspended in 2020 at the request of the government of Kabul. He dropped the investigation into the war crimes in Afghanistan committed by international forces, including the United States, in Afghanistan. He also dropped the investigation into the United States' use of secret CIA prisons in Poland, Romania and Lithuania in the early 2000s where kidnapped prisoners were interrogated and tortured for suspicions of being members of the Taliban or Al-Qaida. Khan said the investigations were dropped because of the limited financial means of the ICC.

In April 2022, Khan said of the Russian invasion of Ukraine: "We have reasonable grounds to believe that crimes within the jurisdiction of the court are being committed." Eleven months later, he applied for two arrest warrants alleging Vladimir Putin and Maria Lvova-Belova violated two Rome Statute rules against systematic deportation, transfer and hostage-taking. In response, Russia issued a warrant for Khan's arrest. In response, the Russian government declared that Khan was wanted in relation to their own investigation of him in relation to his "criminal prosecution of a man who is known to be innocent". On 24 June 2024, the ICC issued arrest warrants for Russian politician and military officer Sergei Shoigu and Russian army general Valery Gerasimov.

In November 2024, Khan requested an arrest warrant for the Myanmar military junta leader, Min Aung Hlaing, for crimes against humanity related to the Rohingya genocide.

In October 2025, the ICC dismissed Khan from the case against former Philippine president Rodrigo Duterte due to perceived conflict of interest stemming from Khan having legally represented victims of Duterte's alleged crimes before taking office as ICC prosecutor.

==== Arrest warrants for Israeli and Hamas leaders ====
In October 2023, during the Gaza war, Business Insider reported that a statement by Khan "appeared to suggest" that both Israel and Hamas could be prosecuted by the ICC. Khan said the bar for evidence that a hospital, school, or place of worship is being used for military purposes is very high. On 17 November 2023, Khan stated the ICC had received a joint request by South Africa, Bangladesh, Bolivia, Comoros, and Djibouti to investigate alleged Israeli war crimes. South African Foreign Minister Naledi Pandor asked Khan why he was able to issue an arrest warrant for Russian President Putin, but not for Israeli Prime Minister Benjamin Netanyahu. The Israeli government called emergency meetings in April 2024 over concerns the ICC could be preparing arrest warrants against Netanyahu, other senior officials, or officers of the Israeli Defense Forces. It decided it would reach out to the court and "diplomatic figures with influence" with the aim of blocking the issuing of arrest warrants. Netanyahu raised the matter in his meetings with Britain's Foreign Secretary David Cameron and Germany's Foreign Minister Annalena Baerbock, and sought their help.

On 24 April 2024, Khan was sent a letter signed by 12 Republican U.S. senators (Note: The letter was signed by Senate Minority Leader Mitch McConnell of Kentucky as well as Senators Tom Cotton of Arkansas, Marsha Blackburn of Tennessee, Katie Britt of Alabama, Ted Budd of North Carolina, Kevin Cramer of North Dakota, Ted Cruz of Texas, Bill Hagerty of Tennessee, Pete Ricketts of Nebraska, Marco Rubio and Rick Scott of Florida and Tim Scott of South Carolina.) threatening him and other UN jurists and their families with personal consequences if the ICC were to seek an international arrest warrant for Benjamin Netanyahu or other members of the Israeli government. The letter cited the American Service-Members' Protection Act – known informally as "The Hague Invasion Act" – which specifically includes "all means". The signatories said they would view any arrest warrant as "a threat not only to Israel's sovereignty, but also to the sovereignty of the United States". They threatened: "Target Israel and we will target you", and that any further action would "end all American support for the ICC" and "exclude [Khan and his associates and employees] and their families from the United States". The letter ended: "You have been warned." UK Foreign Secretary David Cameron told Khan that the UK would defund and withdraw from the ICC if the arrest warrants for Netanyahu and Gallant were issued.

On 20 May 2024, on the advice of a panel of legal experts, (Note: Convened by Khan, the panel comprised, among others, Lord Justice Fulford, Helena, Baroness Kennedy, Judge Theodor Meron, Elizabeth Wilmshurst, Amal Clooney and Marko Milanović. It concluded that the Court had jurisdiction over the case and that there were "reasonable grounds to believe" that individuals named in the arrest warrants had committed war crimes or crimes against humanity within the jurisdiction of the Court.) Khan applied for arrest warrants for Israeli Prime Minister Benjamin Netanyahu, Hamas's leader in Gaza, Yahya Sinwar, Hamas's political wing chairman, Ismail Haniyeh, Hamas member Mohammed al-Masri, and the Israeli defence minister Yoav Gallant. The move came two and a half weeks after Khan learned of accusations of sexual assault made against him. Khan said that the warrants were not issued in an attempt to protect himself from the accusations. The Guardian said a "well-placed source" had told it that the decision to issue arrest warrants for senior Israeli and Hamas figures had already been made when Khan was told of the accusations and warrants were already being drafted.

President of the United States Joe Biden called the application for arrest warrants "outrageous", while Netanyahu called Khan one of the "great antisemites in modern times" after the announcement. Biden and Netanyahu's responses were rebuffed by US attorney Kenneth Roth, who led Human Rights Watch for 29 years.

Statements of support for Khan and the ICC were made in the US and elsewhere. US member of Congress Ilhan Omar said that the ICC "must be allowed to conduct its work independently and without interference". Government representatives of Australia, France, Spain, Ireland, Belgium, Switzerland, Austria, Slovenia, Denmark, Norway, Chile, Canada, South Africa, Maldives, Oman and Jordan expressed support for the ICC's independence. According to Roth, "These charges are not about Israel's right to defend itself, which no one questions. They're about how Israel has chosen to defend itself, and no cause, no matter how just, can be used as an excuse to commit war crimes." The Israeli human rights organisation B'Tselem said: "The era of impunity for Israeli decision-makers is over." In June 2024, 93 nations including the aforementioned reiterated their support for the ICC's independence.

In November 2026, the Jerusalem District Court issued a default judgment ordering Khan to pay NIS 25 million in damages and NIS 2.5 million in legal costs to former hostage Eitan Mor and the families of Avinatan Or and Omri Miran, after Khan fails to submit a defense in a August 2025 civil suit filed by Shurat HaDin alleging that his delays in seeking arrest warrants for Hamas leaders prolonged the hostages' captivity.

==== Arrest warrant for Vladimir Putin and other Russian officials ====
On 17 March 2023, following an investigation of war crimes, crimes against humanity and genocide, the International Criminal Court (ICC) issued arrest warrants for Vladimir Putin, the president of Russia, and Maria Lvova-Belova, Russian commissioner for children's rights, alleging responsibility for the war crime of unlawful deportation and transfer of children during the Russo-Ukrainian War. The warrant against Putin is the first against the leader of a permanent member of the United Nations Security Council.

As of June 2024, the ICC has also issued arrest warrants for Viktor Sokolov, Sergey Kobylash, Sergei Shoigu and Valery Gerasimov, all of whom are officers in the Russian military accused of directing attacks at civilian objects and the crime against humanity of "inhumane acts" under the Rome Statute.

On 12 December 2025 Moscow City Court found that "ICC Prosecutor Karim Khan unlawfully prosecuted Russian citizens in The Hague" and that the ICC "instructed the judges of the chamber to issue patently unlawful arrest warrants." and sentenced Karim Khan to 15 years imprisonment in absentia, while eight ICC staff, including the former court president Piotr Hofmański, were sentenced in absentia to prison terms ranging from 3.5 to 15 years.

== Sanctions ==
On 13 February 2025, the United States Department of the Treasury added Khan to its Specially Designated Nationals and Blocked Persons List. As a result of this sanction, Khan, his wife, and his children are barred from entering the US. Any assets he possesses in the US are frozen, and it is forbidden under US law for any US person or entity (or any foreign individual or company, including their subsidiaries) to provide him with funds, goods, or services. The sanctions occurred after US president Donald Trump signed an executive order on 6 February that sanctioned the ICC for issuing arrest warrants against Netanyahu and Gallant for alleged war crimes in Gaza.

In May 2025, Microsoft blocked Karim Khan's access to his official email account. Microsoft said it did not stop or suspend its services to the ICC. ICC employees said Khan was forced to switch to Proton Mail, an email provider based in Switzerland. This decision, directly tied to U.S. foreign policy, raised concerns over the dependence on US technology services across Europe. Consequently, the ICC said it would transfer its digital system to the European open source alternative openDesk.

== Sexual misconduct allegations ==
In May 2024, the ICC started an investigation into allegations of sexual misconduct by Khan in relation to one of his assistants. The allegations were made public by a whistleblower in October 2024. A second allegation of sexual misconduct by Khan was made in August 2025. In November 2025, Israel requested that the ICC arrest warrants for Israeli leaders be dismissed on the basis of the allegations affecting Khan's impartiality. Khan stated that the allegations were a smear campaign aiming to disrupt the International Criminal Court investigation in Palestine.

Following conflicting determinations from an Office of Internal Oversight Services (OIOS) investigation and a review of that investigation's findings, the Assembly of States Parties Bureau voted to continue disciplinary proceedings against Khan. Khan was subsequently suspended from the ICC pending a vote on whether to remove him. In July 2026 the Assembly of States Parties of the ICC voted to remove Khan from office.

=== Allegations ===
In May 2024, the ICC began investigating sexual misconduct allegations against Khan by one of his assistants. The accuser, a Muslim Malaysian lawyer, said Khan began making sexual advances towards her in March 2023, shortly after she joined his team. She alleged he forced her to engage in nonconsensual sex acts on several occasions, including intercourse in June and December 2023. According to The Wall Street Journal, Khan was informed of the allegations two and a half weeks before he announced the arrest warrants for Israeli leaders.

In October 2024, a whistleblower publicised the allegations. The accuser refused to explicitly confirm or deny them, as she did not want to harm the indictments of Israeli leaders, and no formal inquiry was launched. Anonymous sources close to the accuser said she distrusted the ICC's watchdog, requested an external probe, and did not want to disrupt the investigation of Israeli leaders. ICC officials told The Wall Street Journal that she supported the arrest warrants for Israeli leaders and Khan's decision to pursue them discouraged her from coming forward.

In August 2025, another woman accused Khan of sexual misconduct. She alleged that while she was employed by him during his time as a lawyer, beginning in 2009, he repeatedly invited her to his home, sat in proximity, attempted to kiss and touch her, and pressured her to engage in sexual relations.

=== Responses ===
Khan denied the allegations. In a public statement in October 2024, he said: "This is a moment in which myself and the International Criminal Court are subject to a wide range of attacks and threats. In recent months, my family, including my wife and child, have also been targeted." On a phone call, Khan allegedly tried to persuade the complainant to withdraw the claims, citing that the charges would hurt the Palestine investigation. After the allegations became public, Khan demoted at least four staffers in his office; five sources alleged to Reuters that he was retaliating against those who reported the allegations or criticised how he handled them.

Israel and its allies in the US Congress stated that the allegations compromised his judgement and influenced his decision to pursue the arrest warrants for Israeli leaders. Khan's May 2024 accuser stated that Khan used the prospect of the arrest warrants to try to prevent her from filing the complaint. Two weeks prior to the allegations' release, Le Monde reported on a meeting between Khan and Nicholas Kaufman in which Kaufman allegedly told Khan that if ICC arrest warrants against Israeli prime minister Benjamin Netanyahu and former defence minister Yoav Gallant were not dropped, the ICC and he would be "destroyed", though the connection between the meeting and the allegations are not established.

In November 2025, Israel submitted a filing to the ICC asking that the arrest warrants be dismissed and Khan removed from the Palestine investigation, arguing that the allegations raised doubts of his impartiality. Khan and his supporters have suggested he is the victim of a smear campaign orchestrated by Israel to sabotage the ICC's investigation of Israeli leadership. In August 2025, Middle East Eye (MEE) published a report in which it cast doubt on the first accuser's allegations. MEE wrote that she had sought Khan's assistance in filing a misconduct complaint against another ICC official during the period she alleged Khan abused her; an investigation found no wrongdoing on behalf of the individual. An ICC official told MEE that the allegations were leaked shortly before Khan intended to apply for more arrest warrants for Israeli leaders and surmised that Israel sought to force the ICC to withdraw the existing warrants.

Following a months-long investigation, The Guardian found no evidence that Israel was involved in the allegations against Khan, though pro-Israel actors helped publicise them. An ICC official told The Guardian that Israel's supporters "may have exploited the story but they didn't create [it]". In November 2025, The Guardian reported that Qatar had hired private intelligence firms, including the London-based Highgate, to undermine the credibility of the allegations. According to The Guardian, the operation attempted to find links between the first accuser and Israel. The Guardian said the documents it had seen suggested no evidence of a link was found. The Guardian did not find evidence that Khan was personally involved, though Highgate met his representatives. Highgate confirmed it had conducted an operation concerning the ICC but denied Qatari involvement, while Qatar dismissed the report as "unfounded".

=== Investigations ===
US Congress members initiated an investigation in October 2024 to determine whether the allegations influenced the Israeli war crimes charges. In November 2024, the ICC governing body announced that Khan would face an external investigation into the claims. As a result of the investigation, Khan faced calls to step down from his position as chief prosecutor. On 16 May 2025, Khan's office confirmed that he had temporarily stepped aside from his role and was on administrative leave until the investigation by the UN Office of Internal Oversight Services (OIOS) concluded. Khan's deputy prosecutors were placed in charge of managing the Office of the Prosecutor in his absence.

OIOS conducted its investigation, and in late March 2026, a panel of three ICC judges prepared a report on the OIOS investigation. The OIOS report was not made public. OIOS found that the evidence indicated that Khan had engaged in "non-consensual sexual contact" with the alleged victim. It said that the investigation had not established misconduct beyond any reasonable doubt, the standard normally used in criminal cases. The question of whether to use a criminal or civil evidentiary standard to assess the allegations became controversial.

Khan's legal team said that the report failed to find evidence of misconduct. The panel of judges said that "the investigation was not conclusive enough", but as they had to make a "determination", they stated that, "The Panel is unanimously of the opinion that the factual findings by OIOS do not establish misconduct or breach of duty under the relevant framework." The three judges' report was provided to the Assembly of States Parties Bureau, and 15 of the 21 states voted in favour of making an "initial determination" that Khan may have committed "some form of misconduct". Four states voted against, while two abstained.

In June 2026, Khan was suspended over the allegations pending a vote of the Assembly of States Parties on whether to remove him from his role. Following this, the British Bar Standards Board imposed an interim suspension on him from practicing.

=== Dismissal ===
On 24 July 2026, the ICC's 125 member states voted to remove Khan as chief prosecutor of the ICC during a special vote at the headquarters of the United Nations in New York City. In a secret ballot, an absolute majority of 82 states found he had committed serious misconduct and serious breach of duty, 13 voted against the move and 15 abstained. The UN said that the ICC Assembly would elect his replacement shortly.

== Personal life ==
Khan is married to Dato Shyamala Alagendra, a Malaysian lawyer with whom he has two sons. He is an Ahmadi Muslim. Khan is a life member of the Human Rights Institute, International Bar Association, and a founding director of the Peace and Justice Initiative, a The Hague-based NGO focused on effective implementation of the Rome Statute of the International Criminal Court at national levels.

== Notes ==
Legal offices
| Preceded by Fatou Bensouda | Prosecutor of the International Criminal Court; 2021–2026 | Succeeded by vacant |
