= Oslo Forum =

- Status: Active
- Genre: Conference
- Frequency: Annual
- Location: Oslo
- Country: Norway
- Established: 2003
- Participants: c. 100
- Major events: Improve mediation practice and build a community of conflict mediation practitioners
- Organiser: Royal Norwegian Ministry of Foreign Affairs and the Centre for Humanitarian Dialogue (HD)
- Website: www.osloforum.org

The Oslo Forum convenes senior conflict mediators, high level decision makers, key peace process actors, analysts and experts in an informal and discreet retreat to share their experiences, identify challenges and reflect on mediation practice." The retreat is held annually in June in Oslo, Norway, and is co-hosted by the Royal Norwegian Ministry of Foreign Affairs and the Centre for Humanitarian Dialogue (HD), a private diplomacy organisation based in Switzerland. Participation is by invitation-only. All discussions take place under the Chatham House Rule.

== History ==
The Mediators' Retreat, which in 2006 became known as the Oslo Forum, was initiated in 2003 as a small gathering of mediation practitioners. The first Forum only included 17 participants but the event has now expanded to around 100 participants each year. The Forum is scheduled over two days.

In November 2005, a regional retreat was organised for the first time in Singapore to discuss peace processes in South and South East Asia. Since then, Asian and African regional retreats have regularly taken place to complement the global retreat organised in Oslo.

== Purpose ==
The Forum aims to improve mediation practice, by facilitating open exchange, debate and reflection across institutional and conceptual divides, analysing commonly held perceptions about conflicts and providing a safe venue for sharing experiences and best practices. The Forum also provides informal networking opportunities that encourage coordination and cooperation when needed and facilitates space for conflict parties to advance their negotiations.

== Participants ==
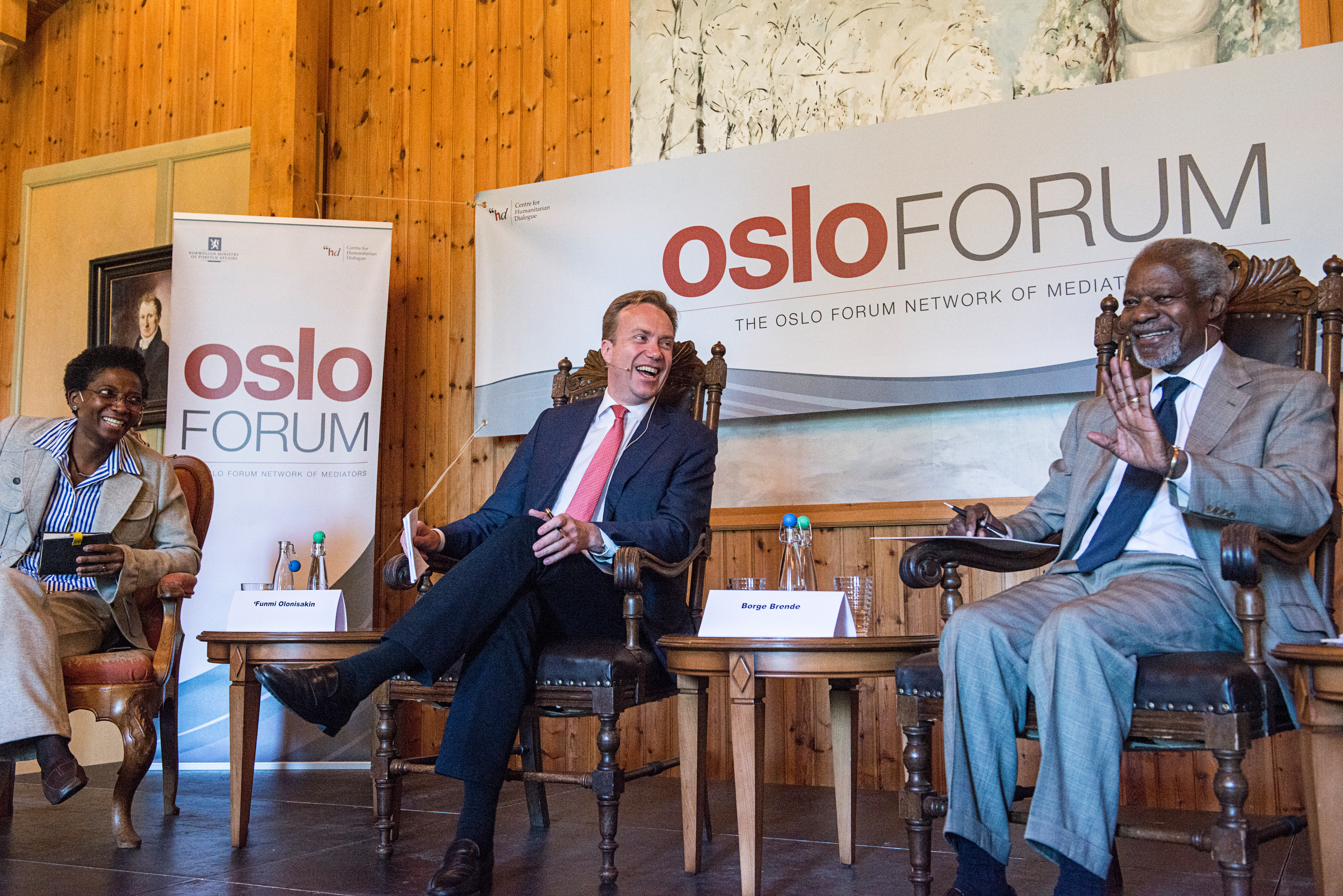
Dr Funmi Olonisakin, H.E. Mr Børge Brende and H.E. Mr Kofi Annan

Every year approximately one hundred conflict mediators, high-level decision makers, key peace process actors, war correspondents, outstanding analysts, thinkers and experts on specific issues attend the Oslo Forum.

Participants have included António Guterres, Hassan Ali Khaire, Federica Mogherini, Mohammad Javad Zarif, President Juan Manuel Santos, Fatou Bensouda, John Kerry, President Jimmy Carter, and Kofi Annan,. The Oslo Forum has also hosted several Nobel Peace Prize laureates.

The participation of conflict protagonists has attracted international media attention. In 2015 Reuters reported that Afghan senior officials as well as Taliban representatives attended the Oslo Forum. Syrian government and opposition representatives have attended in recent years. Media also reported the attendance of representatives from the Philippines Government and the Moro Islamic Liberation Front (MILF) in the context of a resumption of talks in summer 2013.

== Media coverage ==
All discussions at the Oslo Forum are held under the Chatham House Rule of non-attribution. International media outlets have, however, covered main themes discussed at the Oslo Forum. This includes for example BBC coverage of discussions on possible peace talks with the Taliban in 2010 and 2015. Interviews with selected Oslo Forum participants on the side lines of the event and a recap of main themes have also featured in the New York Times, the Economist and numerous other outlets.

== Publications ==
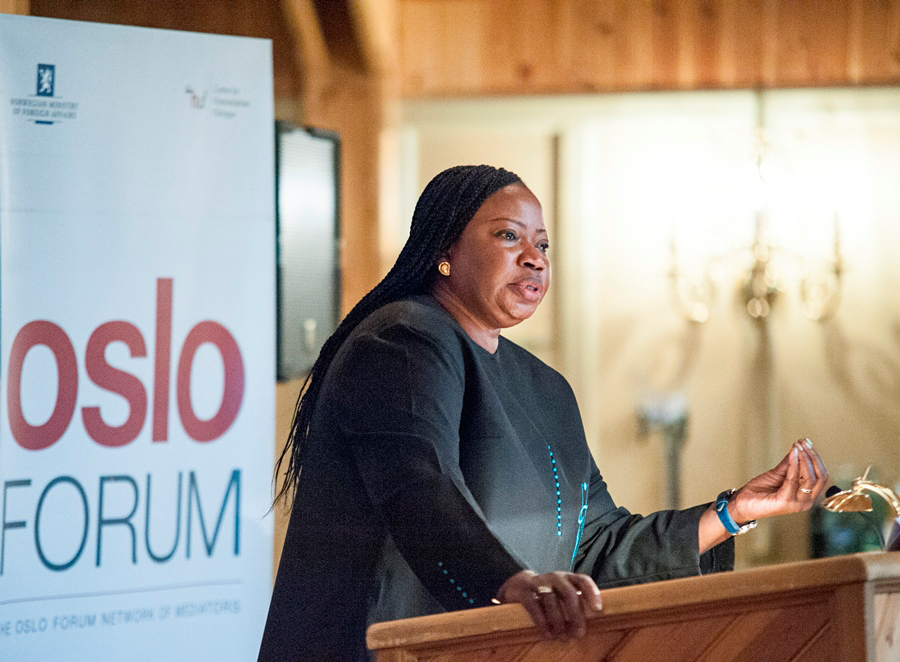
International Criminal Court Prosecutor Fatou Bensouda speaking at the Oslo Forum in 2014

A summary of discussions at the Oslo Forum is available to the public through annual reports, published by the Centre for Humanitarian Dialogue (HD). HD also commissions policy and background papers specifically for Oslo Forum retreats. These papers are published online upon completion of each retreat and can be accessed through the Oslo Forum website and HD website. Selected public speeches held at the Oslo Forum are available online.
