= James Kirkpatrick Stewart =

Canadian lawyer

Deputy Prosecutor of the International Criminal Court
- In office 8 March 2013 – 8 March 2022
- Nominated by: Fatou Bensouda
- Preceded by: Fatou Bensouda; Serge Brammertz
- Succeeded by: Mame Mandiaye Niang; Nazhat Shameem Khan

Personal details
- Education: Bishop's College School; Queen's University at Kingston; Université Laval; University of Toronto
- Profession: Jurist, international prosecutor

James Kirkpatrick Stewart is a Canadian lawyer with over thirty years of experience as Crown counsel handling criminal trials and appeals for the prosecution, including more than eight years working with the United Nations in international criminal law prosecutions as a trial and appellate counsel and legal manager. Stewart was nominated by Fatou Bensouda, Prosecutor for the International Criminal Court (ICC) in The Hague, as one of three candidates for election to the post of ICC Deputy Prosecutor (Prosecution). He was duly elected by the Assembly of States Parties on 16 November 2012 for a period of nine years. Mr Stewart was sworn in on 8 March 2013, and as Deputy Prosecutor of the ICC he reported directly to the Prosecutor.

Stewart was previously employed as General Counsel in the Crown Law Office – Criminal, Ministry of the Attorney General, in Toronto, Ontario, Canada. In the past, he has served as Senior Trial Attorney in the Office of the Prosecutor (OTP) at the International Criminal Tribunal for Rwanda (ICTR); as Chief of Prosecutions in the OTP at the International Criminal Tribunal for the former Yugoslavia (ICTY); and as Senior Appeals Counsel and then Chief of the Appeals and Legal Advisory Division in the OTP at the ICTR.

Stewart is married and has three children.

== Early life, education, and work as Crown counsel ==
Stewart was born in Montreal, Quebec, Canada, and is bilingual in English and French. Educated at Bishop's College School in Lennoxville, Québec, he attended Queen's University, in Kingston, Ontario (B.A., 1967), and Université Laval, in Sainte-Foy, Québec (M. ès A., 1971). In 1975, he graduated from the Faculty of Law at the University of Toronto, articled for prominent criminal defence lawyer Robert J. Carter, Q.C., in 1975–6, and was called to the Ontario Bar in 1977.

After serving with the Office of the Ombudsman as a legal officer for two years, Stewart joined the Downtown Toronto Crown Attorney's Office as an Assistant Crown Attorney in 1979, handling criminal trials at all levels of court. Since 1985, Stewart has served in the Crown Law Office – Criminal, where his practice expanded to include appeals before the Court of Appeal for Ontario and the Supreme Court of Canada. On leaves of absence from his office, he has worked at the UN international criminal tribunals.

== International criminal prosecutor and legal manager ==
In 1997–1998, the prosecution team that Stewart led as Senior Trial Attorney successfully conducted the first trials for genocide, crimes against humanity, and war crimes heard by the ICTR Trial Chambers in Arusha, Tanzania. Stewart then served as the first Chief of Prosecutions at the ICTY in The Hague, Netherlands, in 1999–2001, managing a complex division that had carriage of all trial proceedings before the ICTY Trial Chambers.

Stewart returned to the ICTR in 2004–2007, starting as Senior Appeals Counsel and then becoming the first Chief of the Appeals and Legal Advisory Division. Working with a team of lawyers, he developed the capacity of the ICTR OTP to handle criminal appeals, which until then had been the responsibility of counsel at the ICTY.

== See also ==
- List of Bishop's College School alumni
