= David Harland =

New Zealand diplomat (born 1962)

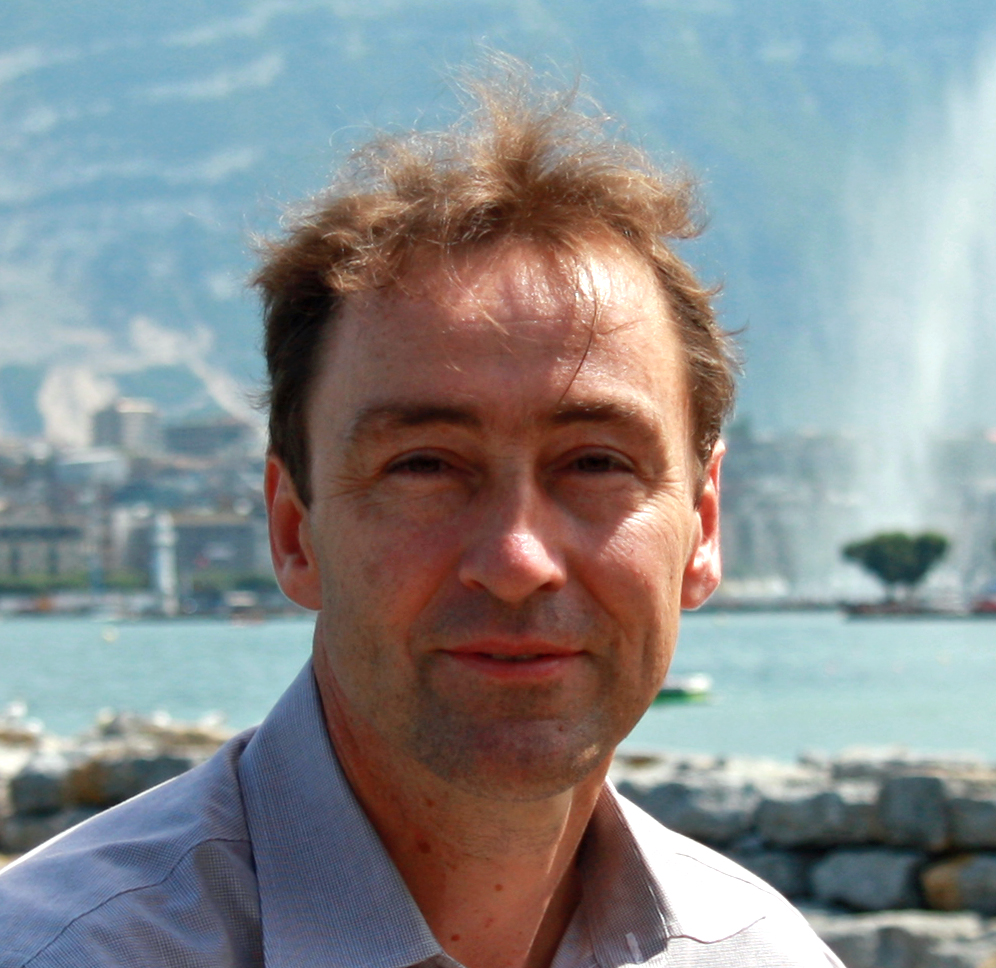
- David Harland
- Born: 28 September 1962 (age 64); Wellington, New Zealand
- Occupation: Executive Director of the Centre for Humanitarian Dialogue

David Harland (born 28 September 1962 in Wellington) is a New Zealand diplomat who has been the executive director of the Centre for Humanitarian Dialogue (HD), a Geneva-based foundation that specialises in the mediation of armed conflict, since 2011. Harland served as a witness for the prosecution in a number of cases at the International Criminal Tribunal for the former Yugoslavia.

== Early life and education ==
Harland is the son of late New Zealand ambassador Bryce Harland.

Harland holds a PhD from the Fletcher School of Law and Diplomacy (1994), a Master's degree from Harvard University (East Asian studies, 1991), a graduate diploma (进修证) from Beijing University (1988) and a Bachelor of Arts from Victoria University of Wellington, New Zealand (1983).

== Career ==
Harland was appointed HD's Executive Director in 2011. In 2018, he publicly announced that the Basque armed group ETA had dissolved itself as the final step in a long-running process to bring an end to violence in the Basque country.

In 2022, David Harland and HD were cited as an initiator of the UN-brokered deals to ease the global food crisis by facilitating agricultural exports from Russia and Ukraine.

HD was awarded the Carnegie Wateler Peace Prize for 2022 "for its more than 20-year track record in ending armed conflict and for its patient, creative and discreet approach”.

Harland also sits on the UN Secretary-General's High-Level Advisory Board on Mediation and on the Scientific Advisory Board of the Robert Koch Institute Centre for International Health Protection (ZIG).

Prior to that, Harland was adjunct professor at the Johns Hopkins School of Advanced International Studies (SAIS) and Chair of the World Economic Forum Global Agenda Council on Conflict Prevention.

Before joining HD, Harland was director of the Europe and Latin America Division of the United Nations Department of Peacekeeping Operations (2006–2011), where he managed the end of the UN transitional administration in Kosovo.

He served in UN peacekeeping missions in Haiti (2010), in Kosovo (2008), in Timor Leste (1999–2000), where he set up and oversaw what would be the first government departments, and in Bosnia and Herzegovina (1993–1998), where he co-led (with the Office of the High Representative) the post-war effort to increase freedom of movement through the introduction of a new national license plate, which he designed.

During 1999, he was released from his regular duties, together with Salman Ahmed, to research and draft the UN report on the Srebrenica massacre – "The Fall of Srebrenica". He was a teaching fellow at Harvard University in 1989–1991.

Harland served as a witness for the prosecution at the International Criminal Tribunal for the former Yugoslavia in the cases of The Prosecutor versus Ratko Mladic (2012), The Prosecutor versus Radovan Karadžic (2010), The Prosecutor versus Dragomir Miloševic (2007) and the Prosecutor versus Slobodan Miloševic (2004).

He was a script advisor for the Oscar-nominated film Quo Vadis, Aida? (2019–2020)

== Publications ==
- "Killing Game", Praeger Press, 1994.
- "Legitimacy and effectiveness in international administration", Global Governance, 15, 18, 2004.
- "Post-Dayton Bosnia and Herzegovina", With Elizabeth Cousens, In William J. Durch, ed., Twenty-First-Century Peace Operations. Washington, D.C.: United States Institute of Peace Press (2006): 49–140.
- "Kosovo and the UN", 'Survival: Global Politics and Strategy', volume 52, number 5, October–November 2010, pp 75–98.
- "War is Back – The International Response to Armed Conflict", Horizons, Issue No. 7, Spring 2016, pp. 224–234.
- "Afghanistan: A lesson in how not to negotiate", Geneva Solutions, 23 August 2021.
- "Reversing the decline of diplomacy", Geneva Policy Outlook, 5 Feb 2024
