= Ouagadagou Declaration =

The Ouagadagou Declaration is the final declaration signed by the six political and military movements of Azawad, following a meeting that took place in Burkina Faso at the end of August 2014. The purpose of the declaration was to put an end to hostilities in northern Mali and to establish a political and legal status for Azawad. It was signed on August 28, 2014, in Ouagadougou, Burkina Faso. During this meeting, the groups were gathered together for the first time since the Ouagadougou Agreements of June 2013. The meeting took place following the first round of the Algiers peace negotiations in July 2014 and before these negotiations resumed in Algiers on September 1, 2014.

== Background ==
A meeting took place in Ouagadougou from 25 to 28 August bringing together six different armed groups in northern Mali. The meeting was intended to encourage dialogue to resolve participants’ differences and to present a united front during official negotiations with the Malian government in Algiers, to find an acceptable solution to all the parties to the Northern Mali conflict.

The meeting was facilitated and moderated by the Centre for Humanitarian Dialogue (HD), chaired by High Council for Unity of Azawad (HCUA) and co-financed by the United Nations Multidimensional Integrated Stabilization Mission in Mali (MINUSMA).

== Participants ==
The participants of this meeting included:

- The High Council for Unity of Azawad (HCUA)
- The National Movement for the Liberation of Azawad (MNLA)
- The Arab Movement of Azawad (MAA) signatory of the Algiers Platform of June 14, 2014
- Coalition for the People of Azawad (CPA), and
- Coordination of Patriotic Resistance Movements and Forces (CMFPR)

== Results ==
The meeting helped to develop a conflict management committee in northern Mali and to establish a monitoring committee for the Ouagadougou Declaration. The HCUA, with support from HD, worked to bring all groups together to resolve their disputes. It encouraged them to develop a common position during the negotiations in Algiers and therefore to facilitate the discussions with the government in the rounds following the Declaration.

The declaration also brought an end to rivalries and hostilities on the ground especially between the MAA, MNLA group and MAA around Tabankort. Discussions during the meeting allowed an exchange of prisoners between the two groups.

== Signatories ==
The declaration was signed by:

Algabass Ag Intalla representing the Coordination of Political-Military Movement of Azawad / northern Mali (MNLA, HCUA, MAA and CMFPR).

Ahmed Ould Sidi Mohamed representing the Movement Coordination Politico-Military Azawad signatories of the Algiers Platform of June 14, 2014 (CPA, CMFPR and MAA), also known as "the Platform".
