= Mame Mandiaye Niang =

Senegalese lawyer and prosecutor (born 1960)

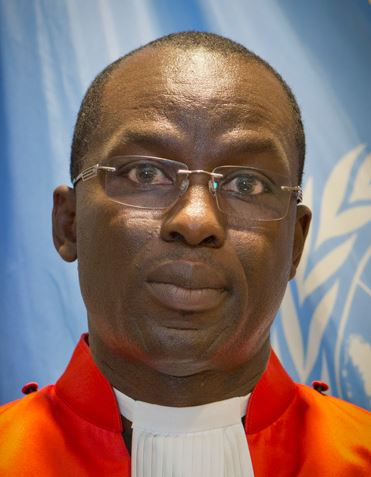
- Niang in 2014

Deputy Prosecutor of the International Criminal Court
- Incumbent
- Assumed office 7 March 2022 Serving with Nazhat Shameem Khan
- Nominated by: Karim Ahmad Khan
- Preceded by: James Stewart

Judge of the International Criminal Tribunal for the former Yugoslavia
- In office 30 October 2013 – 31 March 2016

Judge of the International Criminal Tribunal for Rwanda
- In office 30 October 2013 – 31 December 2015

Personal details
- Born: 20 September 1960 (age 66) Senegal
- Education: École nationale d'Administration et de Magistrature (Dakar)

Mame Mandiaye Niang (born 20 September 1960) is a Senegalese lawyer and prosecutor who has been serving as Deputy Prosecutor of the International Criminal Court (ICC) since 2022. He has held several senior positions in the Senegalese judiciary, including in the Ministry of Justice, the Supreme Court of Senegal, and the Regional Court of Dakar, as well as judicial and prosecutorial roles within the United Nations, notably at the International Criminal Tribunal for Rwanda (ICTR) and the International Criminal Tribunal for the former Yugoslavia (ICTY). In 2021, he was elected Deputy Prosecutor of the ICC.

== Biography ==
Niang graduated from the École nationale d'Administration et de Magistrature in Dakar, Senegal. He has held senior positions in the national judiciary, including as Public Prosecutor at the Court of Appeal of Saint-Louis, Director of Criminal Affairs and Pardons at the Ministry of Justice, and Auditor of the Supreme Court of Senegal. He has also served as magistrate and prosecutor at the Regional Court of Dakar.

=== International Career ===
==== Judgeship at the ICTR and the ICTY ====
Niang served at the ICTR from 1997 to 2011, including Legal Officer, Senior Legal Officer and Chief of Staff of the Registrar. He later served as Regional Representative of the United Nations Office on Drugs and Crime (UNODC) in Southern Africa from 2011 to 2013. In 2013, he was appointed as Judge of the Appeals Chamber of the ICTR and the ICTY.

==== Deputy Prosecutor Tenure at the ICC ====
On 10 December 2021, Niang was elected Deputy Prosecutor of the International Criminal Court during the twentieth session of the Assembly of States Parties to the Rome Statute, and was sworn in on 7 March 2022. In 2025, during the investigation into the conduct of Chief Prosecutor Karim Ahmad Khan, Niang assumed the role of acting Chief Prosecutor and continued to carry out prosecutorial functions alongside fellow Deputy Prosecutor Nazhat Shameem Khan.

== US Sanctions ==
On August 20, 2025, the US Department of the Treasury and the Department of State designated Niang and his co-prosecutor Shameem Khan for upholding the arrest warrants against Prime Minister Netanyahu and former Defense Minister Gallant and effectively continuing the line of investigation taken by Prosecutor Khan who was on leave due to an ongoing investigation into serious allegations of sexual misconduct.

== Publications ==
Niang has co-authored several books on international humanitarian law and criminal procedure, published articles in legal journals in both French and English, and served as visiting professor at institutions such as the École nationale des Assistants sociaux et Educateurs spécialisés, the Centre de Formation judiciaire in Dakar, the University of Rwanda, and the Institute of International Law at Makerere University in Uganda. He has also been a member of the Union des Magistrats sénégalais and the Senegalese section of the International Association of Penal Law.
