= Fatou Bensouda =

Gambian lawyer (born 1961)

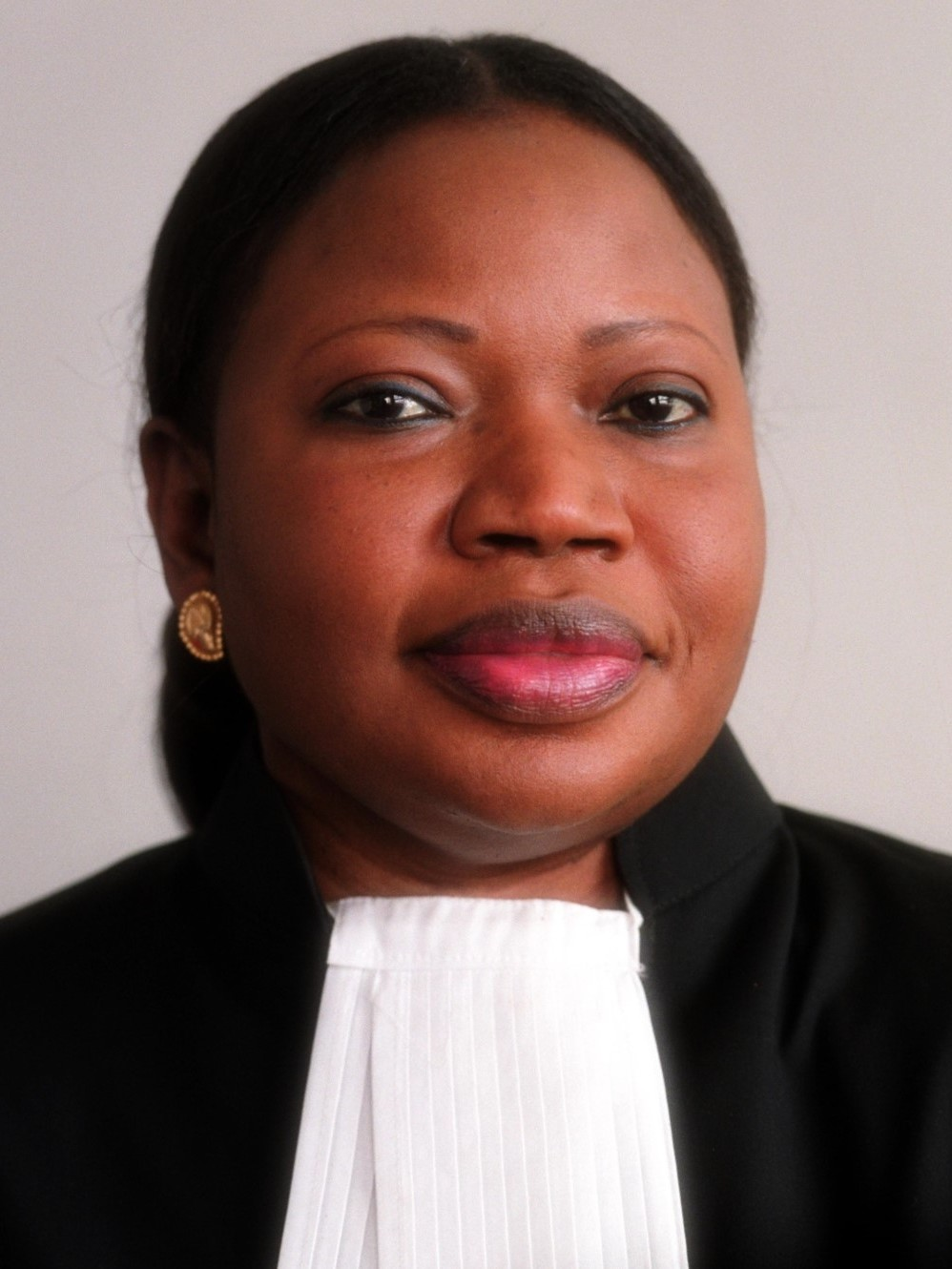
- Official portrait, 2008

Gambian High Commissioner to the United Kingdom
- Incumbent
- Assumed office 3 August 2022
- President: Adama Barrow
- Preceded by: Francis Rene Blain

Prosecutor of the International Criminal Court
- In office 15 June 2012 – 15 June 2021
- President: Song Sang-Hyun; Silvia Fernández de Gurmendi; Chile Eboe-Osuji; Piotr Hofmański
- Deputy: James Stewart
- Preceded by: Luis Moreno Ocampo
- Succeeded by: Karim Khan

Deputy Prosecutor of the International Criminal Court
- In office 8 September 2004 – 15 June 2012 Serving with Serge Brammertz
- Nominated by: Luis Moreno Ocampo
- President: Philippe Kirsch; Song Sang-hyun
- Preceded by: Position established
- Succeeded by: James Stewart

Minister of Justice and Attorney General of The Gambia
- In office 1998–2000
- President: Yahya Jammeh
- Preceded by: Hawa Sisay-Sabally
- Succeeded by: Pap Cheyassin Secka

Personal details
- Born: Fatou Bom Nyang; 31 January 1961 (age 65) Bathurst, The Gambia
- Spouse: Philip Bensouda
- Children: 3
- Education: University of Ife; Nigerian Law School; International Maritime Law Institute
- Occupation: International Criminal Law Prosecutor, diplomat
- Profession: Lawyer

Fatou Bom Bensouda (/fɑːˈtuː bɛnˈsuːdɑː/; née Nyang; born 31 January 1961) is a Gambian lawyer who has served as the Gambian High Commissioner to the United Kingdom since 3 August 2022.

She served as prosecutor of the International Criminal Court (ICC) from June 2012 to June 2021, after having served as a deputy prosecutor in charge of the prosecutions division of the ICC from 2004 to 2012. She earlier served as a Minister of Justice and Attorney General of The Gambia from 1998 to 2000. She has also held positions as a legal adviser and a trial attorney at the International Criminal Tribunal for Rwanda (ICTR).

== Early life and education ==
Fatou Bom Bensouda was born on 31 January 1961 in the city of Banjul (then Bathurst) during the period when The Gambia was under British colonial rule, into a polygamous Muslim family. She is the daughter of Omar Gaye Nyang, a government driver and wrestling promoter. Her father was a landowner who also owned several wrestling arenas in the country. She is the niece of the Gambian historian and author Alieu Ebrima Cham Joof. Her father is related to the Joof family through his maternal grandmother Ndombuur Joof (Alieu Ebrima Cham Joof's great-aunt). Ndombuur is also the paternal grandmother of the singer Marie Samuel Njie.

As a young girl, Bensouda used to sneak into local courts after school to follow court proceedings.

She attended primary and secondary school in the Gambia and moved to Nigeria in 1982. She graduated from the University of Ife with a Bachelor of Laws (Hons) degree in 1986. The following year, she received accreditation as a barrister-at-law from Nigeria Law School. She became one of Gambia's first experts in international maritime law after earning a master's of laws from the International Maritime Law Institute in Malta.

== Career ==
=== Sir Dawda Jawara's Regime ===
Bensouda began her career as state counsel in 1987 in her native country of The Gambia, and then Deputy Director of Public Prosecutions in February 1994 for Sir Dawda Jawara's government.

=== Yahya Jammeh's Regime ===
When President Yahya Jammeh took power in a military coup in July 1994, Bensouda played a central role in the early years of his administration. She first served as General Legal Adviser from 1996 to 1998 . She was appointed Minister of Justice and Attorney General in August 1998. She was removed from office in March 2000 by President Jammeh. After she was relieved of her government duties, she transitioned into private legal practice in the Gambia from 2000 to 2002.

==== Criticism ====
Bensouda's time under Jammeh's rule has been criticised by some who accuse her of turning a blind eye to the atrocities committed by the Gambian dictator. Yahya Jammeh's regime was accused by human rights groups of various abuses. He was notably accused of extrajudicial killings and harassment of the opposition and the press.

Critics allege that she barely criticised Jammeh's regime for the atrocities it committed during her 6 years in office. However, she denied responsibility for her prosecutions and knowledge of cases of torture under the regime.

=== Adama Barrow's Regime ===
Bensouda was appointed as The Gambia's High Commissioner to the UK in 2022 a position she holds to date. She replaced Francis Blain who died in January 2022.

=== International Criminal Court ===
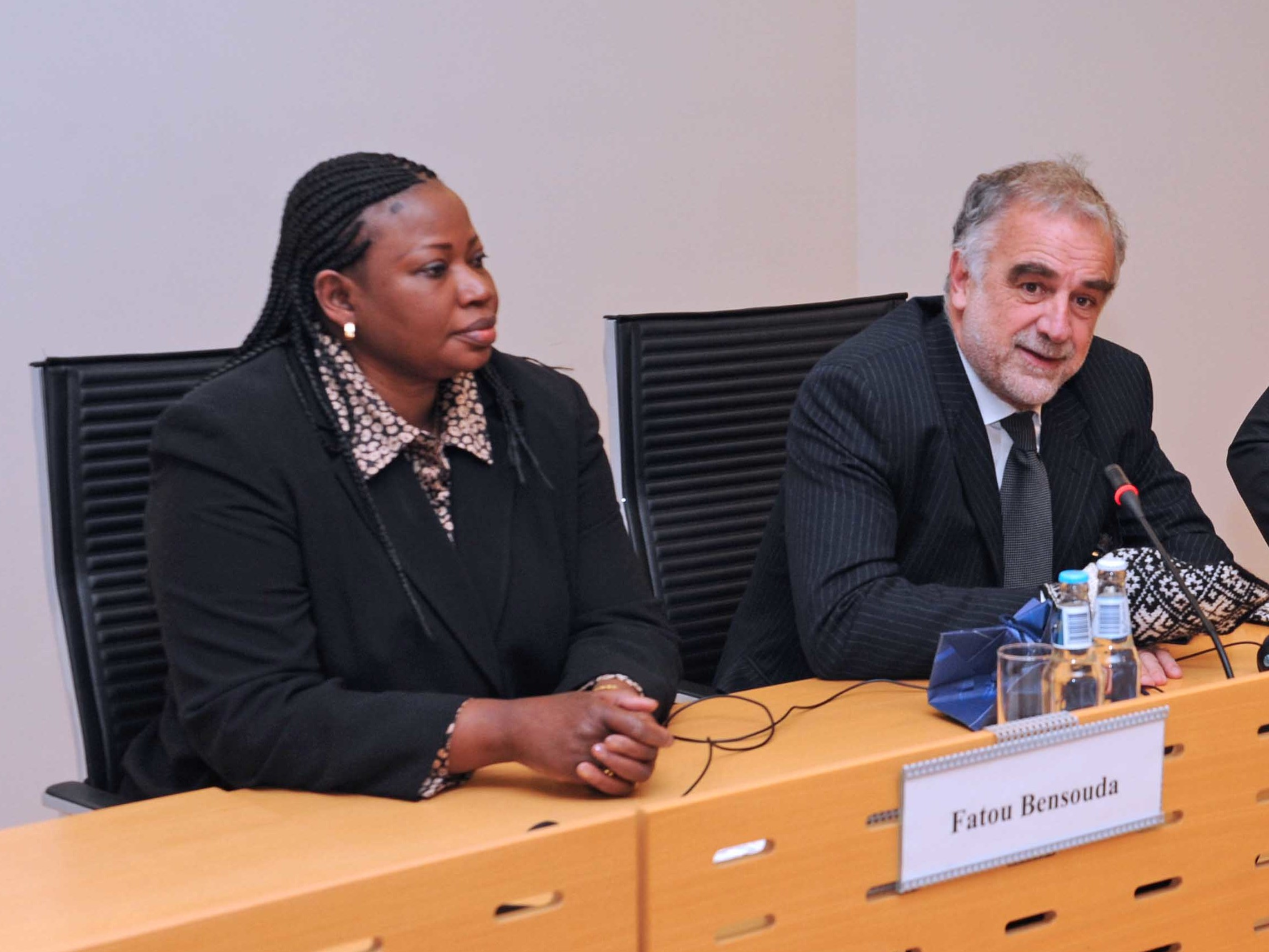
ICC prosecutors Fatou Bensouda and Luis Moreno Ocampo

Bensouda's international career as a non-government civil servant began at the International Criminal Tribunal for Rwanda, where she worked as a legal adviser and a trial attorney before rising to the position of senior legal adviser and head of the Legal Advisory Unit (May 2002 to August 2004). On 8 August 2004, she was elected as Deputy Prosecutor (Prosecutions) with an overwhelming majority of votes by the Assembly of State Parties of the International Criminal Court. On 1 November 2004, she was sworn into Office as Deputy Prosecutor (Prosecutions).

On 1 December 2011, the Assembly of States Parties of the ICC announced that an informal agreement had been reached to make Bensouda the consensus choice to succeed Luis Moreno-Ocampo as Prosecutor of the ICC. She was formally elected by consensus on 12 December 2011. Her term as prosecutor began on 15 June 2012.

According to an Associated Press report on 6 November 2015, Bensouda was advised that war crimes may have been committed on the ship MV Mavi Marmara in 2010, when eight Turks and one Turkish-American were killed and several other activists were wounded by Israeli commandos, but she ruled that the case was not serious enough to merit an investigation on behalf of the ICC.

In October 2017, Bensouda and two members of her staff were accused by Der Spiegel of staying in touch with her predecessor, questioning the Prosecutor's integrity when Bensouda sent confidential information to Ocampo. It was also suggested that Bensouda sought the advice of her predecessor on several occasions and perhaps allowed herself to be influenced by him, specifically in Kenya and Yazidi cases.

In November 2017, Bensouda advised the ICC to consider seeking charges for human rights abuses committed during the War in Afghanistan such as alleged rapes and torture by the United States Armed Forces and the Central Intelligence Agency, crimes against humanity committed by the Taliban, and war crimes committed by the Afghan National Security Forces. John Bolton, National Security Advisor of the United States, claimed that the International Criminal Court had no jurisdiction over the United States, which has not ratified the Rome Statute that created the ICC. However, Afghanistan did ratify the Rome Statute, and thus crimes committed on its territory by anyone, even if he or she is a citizen of a country that did not accept the ICC's legitimacy, is subject to its jurisdiction.

In April 2018 following the 2017-2018 Rohingya Crisis in which hundreds of thousands of mostly-Muslim Rohingya people in western Myanmar's Rakhine State were attacked or driven from their homes by government and civilian attackers, in alleged ethnic cleansing and genocide — Bensouda sought a ruling from the ICC that it had jurisdiction over the crisis, despite Myanmar having never ratified the Rome Statute. Because many of the Rohingya were driven into neighboring Bangladesh, a signatory to the statute, the court concurred with her, and a full-scale investigation was initiated.

In December 2020, regarding Ukraine and Russia, Bensouda alleged that a preliminary ICC probe found indications of "a broad range of conduct" in 2013-2014 that constituted "war crimes and crimes against humanity", and said they were "within the jurisdiction of the [ICC]." The alleged crimes were connected with violent government suppression of pro-European protests from 2013 to 2014, and claims of crimes in Crimea around and following the 2014 Russian annexation of Crimea, and in eastern Ukraine, where Russia had supported rebels since 2014. However, the prosecutors did not get permission for a full-scale investigation until after Bensouda left the court.

Bensouda opened a preliminary examination into the situation in Palestine in 2015. During the annual high-level debate of the UN General Assembly September 2018, Joseph Kabila — president of the Democratic Republic of the Congo for 18 years (2001–2019) — invited Bensouda to a meeting in his New York hotel ostensibly to discuss Rwandan war crimes in the DRC. During the meeting Kabila asked her staff to leave and subsequently introduced the director of the Mossad, Yossi Cohen. During his rule, Kabila befriended Israeli mining billionaire Dan Gertler, who was sanctioned by US authorities. Cohen utilized this arranged environment to pressure Bensouda into dropping the ICC's Palestine investigation and dissuade her from opening war crime inquiries against Israel — a move Bensouda interpreted as a direct trap set by Kabila. This initial encounter paved the way for a broader intimidation campaign. Cohen allegedly made multiple attempts to persuade and threaten Bensouda, including warning her that continuing the Palestine investigation could compromise the safety of her and her family.

In 2019, Bensouda announced the investigation in the Palestine case. Less than a month before handing over her post to her successor, Karim Khan, she declared in a podcast: "Something I have experienced is pressure, attacks and politicization [but] what we do in this office is critically important," adding, "History will judge us." In May 2026, in an interview with Al Jazeera, Bensouda stated that Cohen arranged a series of meetings to pressure her into dropping the ICC investigations.

The US State Department revoked Bensouda's visa in early April 2019. The Guardian reported that the visa withdrawal seemed to be the fulfillment of a threat from Secretary of State Mike Pompeo to prevent ICC personnel from investigating whether US servicemen or US officials engaged in war crimes in Afghanistan, Poland, Romania and Lithuania. The visa revocation triggered criticism from United Nations officials.

In June 2020, Trump issued an executive order that allowed the United States to block assets of ICC employees, and prevent them and their immediate families from entering the country. In September 2020, US Secretary of State Pompeo said that Bensouda and another senior ICC official, Phakiso Mochochoko, would be sanctioned under this order, and that those who "materially support those individuals risk exposure to sanctions as well". On 2 September 2020, Bensouda was named a "specially designated national" by the United States government under the Trump administration, forbidding all U.S. persons and companies from doing business with her. The Biden administration reversed course on 2 April 2021 when President Joe Biden revoked EO 13928, removing Bensouda from the SDN list; US Secretary of State Antony Blinken released a statement calling the previous sanctions "inappropriate and ineffective", but restated that Washington would continue opposing ICC's actions relating to Afghanistan and the Palestinian conflict. In 2025, Trump revived sanctions targeting the ICC after returning to office.

On 15 June 2021, after a nine-year mandate as Prosecutor of the International Criminal Court, Bensouda stepped down, passing her role to Karim Khan.

== Other activities ==
=== Professional associations and boards ===
Bensouda is a member of the International Gender Champions (IGC). She was previously a member of International Advisory Council, International Board of Maritime Healthcare. She is a member of both The Gambia Bar Association and the Nigeria Bar Association. She is also a member of the International Association of Prosecutors.

Bensouda also served on the Governing Council of the Gambia Committee on Harmful Traditional Practices (GAMCOTRAP) which is a leading women's rights organization fighting against harmful traditional practices and Member of The Advisory Board of The African Centre For Democracy and Human Rights Studies from 1998 to 2000. Bensouda is a former 1st Vice President of The Gambia National Olympics Committee (GNOC). From 1992 to 1995, she served as a board member of Gambia High School Board of Governors and a member of the Executive Committee of the Marina International School, The Gambia from 1994.

=== Lectures ===
Bensouda has given several lectures on the ICC, and its challenges and successes, on several platforms, notably ''The Office of the Prosecutor of the International Criminal Court: Successes, Challenges and the Promise of International Criminal Justice'' in the Lecture Series of the United Nations Audiovisual Library of International Law.

== Awards and honours ==
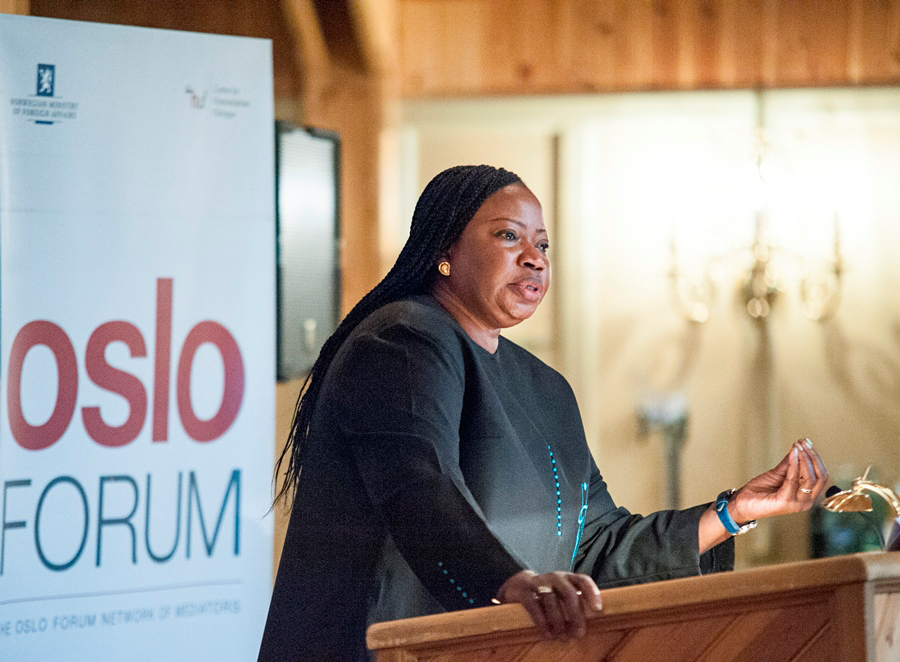
Fatou Bensouda speaking at the Oslo Forum 2014

Bensouda has been the recipient of various awards, most notably, the distinguished ICJ International Jurists Award in 2009, which was presented by the then President of India Pratibha Patil. Bensouda was presented the award for her contributions to criminal law both at the national and international level.

Bensouda has also been awarded the 2011 World Peace Through Law Award presented by the Whitney R. Harris World Law Institute at Washington University in St. Louis, which recognized her work in considerably advancing the rule of law and thereby contributing to world peace.

In 2012, Time magazine listed Bensouda among the 100 most influential people in the world in its annual Time 100 issue, noting her role as a "leading voice pressing governments to support the quest for justice".

The African magazine Jeune Afrique named Bensouda as the 4th most influential person in Africa in the Civil Society category and one of the 100 most Influential African Personalities.

In December 2014, the Togolese magazine Africa Top Success named her "African of the Year", ahead of Isabel dos Santos, Angélique Kidjo, Lupita Nyong'o, Daphne Mashile-Nkosi and Koki Mutungi.

In 2015, she was listed as one of BBC's 100 Women.

The same year, she was awarded a doctorate honoris causa from Keele University (UK).

== Personal life ==
Bensouda is married to a Gambian-Moroccan businessman, Philip Bensouda. They have three children.

Bensouda is a practicing Muslim. Questioned in 2011, on the role of her religion in her job, she answered: "Absolutely, definitely. Islam, as you know, is a religion of peace, and it gives you this inner strength, this inner ability and a sense of justice. Together with my experience, this will help a lot.".

Legal offices
| Preceded by Hawa Sisay-Sabally | Attorney General and Minister of Justice of The Gambia; 1998–2000 | Succeeded by Pap Cheyassin Secka |
| Preceded by Luis Moreno Ocampo | Prosecutor of the International Criminal Court; 2012–2021 | Succeeded by Karim Khan |
