= Nazhat Shameem =

Fijian diplomat

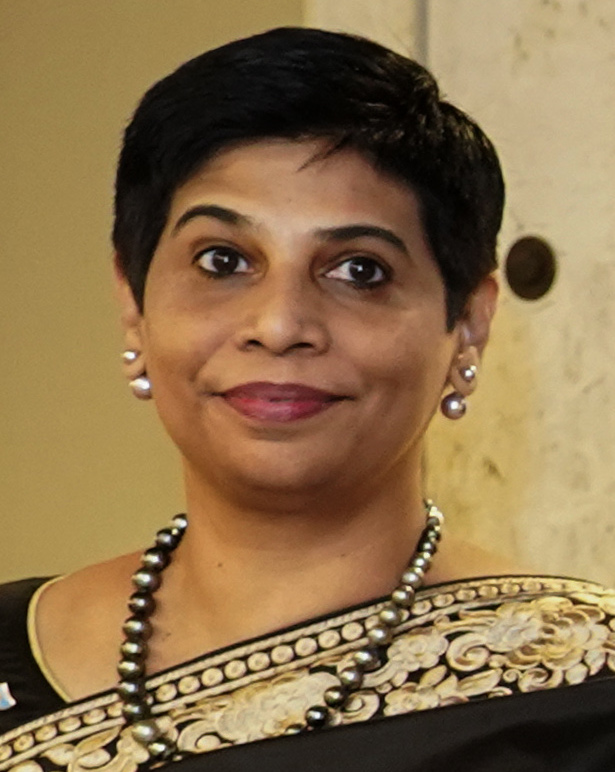
- Shameen at the Palais des Nations in Geneva during the 40th session of the UN Human Rights Council

Deputy Prosecutor of International Criminal Court
- Incumbent
- Assumed office 7 March 2022 Serving with Mame Mandiaye Niang
- Preceded by: James Stewart

President of the United Nations Human Rights Council
- In office 15 January 2021 – 31 December 2021
- Preceded by: Elisabeth Tichy-Fisslberger
- Succeeded by: Federico Villegas

Permanent Representative of the Republic of Fiji to the United Nations
- In office 2014 – 7 June 2022

High Court Judge
- In office 1999 – April 2009

Personal details
- Born: 1960 (age 65–66)
- Relations: Shaista Shameem (sister)
- Children: 1

Nazhat Shameem (born 1960) is a Fijian diplomat, lawyer and former judge who is a deputy prosecutor for the International Criminal Court (ICC) since 2022. She served as the Permanent Representative of Fiji to the United Nations from 2014 to 2022 and the President of the United Nations Human Rights Council in 2021. She previously served as a judge of the High Court of Fiji from 1999 to 2009, the first woman to do so.

== Career ==
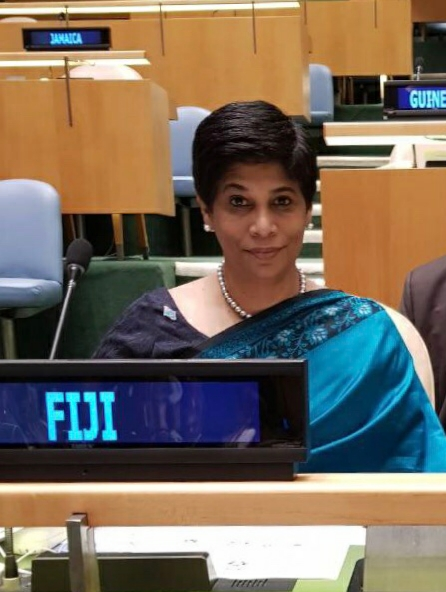
Nazhat Shameem at the United Nations in 2020.

From 1994 to 1999 she was Director of Public Prosecutions after serving as a prosecutor for ten years. She is a graduate of Sussex University and Cambridge University, and is a Barrister of the Inner Temple in London. She holds a Master of Laws and a Master of Philosophy in criminology. She is a former chairperson of Fiji Children's Coordinating Committee for Children and is particularly interested in the way the justice system affects women and children. She has attended conferences internationally and has delivered papers on corruption, judicial transparency and gender equality.

She was appointed to the bench in 1999 as Fiji's first, and as of 2007 so far only, Indo-Fijian female High Court judge. Justice Shameem is in the criminal jurisdiction of the High Court of Fiji.

Shameem is best known for the trials in the aftermath of the 2000 Fijian coup d'état that led to conviction and sentencing of perpetrators of the coup, in which the government of Mahendra Chaudhry was deposed in May 2000. She also heard a number of cases in which she was very critical of prison conditions for remand prisoners in Fiji. In 2005, she declared the remand centre in Suva inhumane and degrading and in breach of the Fiji Constitution. She also heard a case on mandatory imprisonment for drug offenders in 2001, and declared such sentences as disproportionately severe and in breach of Section 25 of the Constitution. The Drugs decree was later repealed by Parliament.

In 2004, Justice Shameem was a keynote speaker at the Tasmanian Anti-Discrimination Commission's international conference 'Beyond Bullying : Sex/Gender, Race/Ethnicity, Class/Status – Celebrating Difference, Embracing Equality', held in Hobart, Tasmania. Her colleague, Justice Tony Gates (in 2007 Acting Chief Justice of the Fiji High Court) presented the after dinner speech at the conference.

Chief Justice Daniel Fatiaki was forcefully removed by armed military officers and policemen from the Chief Justice's chambers as he arrived for work on 19 January 2007.

He was then summarily suspended by the President of Fiji pending disciplinary action. He later accepted a settlement with the Bainimarama government of a lump sum, his pension and the dropping of all charges in return for his resignation.

Before his suspension, no Acting appointment was able to be made by him. In his absence, a meeting of the Judicial Service Commission made up of the President of the Fiji Law Society, the Chairman of the Public Service Commission and the Chief Justice was chaired by Shameem instead of by the Chief Justice. She chaired the meeting as the most senior judge of the High Court and with the concurrence of the two other members of the Commission. The Commission agreed to recommend the next most senior judge, Justice Anthony Gates as the Acting Chief Justice, to the President Ratu Josefa Iloilo, who duly appointed him. The Law Society brought a judicial review action against the acting appointment of the Chief Justice. The matter was heard at leave stage by Justice Andrew Bruce, a Hong Kong Queen's Counsel, who found that Justice Shameem had acted in accordance with a Memorandum of Understanding signed by all the High Court judges in August 2005, including the then Chief Justice Daniel Fatiaki. That Memorandum had said that in a crisis, when the Chief Justice is unable to perform any of the functions of his office, the most senior judge of the High Court will perform those functions to ensure the survival of the judiciary. At the leave hearing, the Law Society conceded that Justice Shameem had acted in good faith and in the interests of the judiciary, but challenged the constitutionality of the chairing of the Commission in the absence of the Chief Justice.

Before the full hearing could proceed, the Fiji Court of Appeal, made up of judges appointed by the challenged Judicial Service Commission, and post-2006, found that the Bainimarama government was unlawfully appointed, and ultra vires of the President's powers. On 11 April 2009, all the judges were removed from office by the President of Fiji, following the abrogation of the Constitution. Shameem was not reappointed. She went on to form a legal consultancy which mainly conducted legal skills workshops for lawyers.

In May 2014, Shameem was appointed Fiji's first Permanent Representative to the United Nations Office in Geneva. On 27 October 2014, she presented her credentials as Fiji's permanent representative to the World Trade Organization to Director-General Roberto Azevedo. In 2021 she was appointed President of the United Nations Human Rights Council though the questionable human rights situation of the country she represents has been pointed out.

In June 2022 she was replaced as permanent representative to the United Nations by Luke Daunivalu.

In December 2021 she was elected a Deputy Prosecutor of the International Criminal Court. She was sworn in on 7 March 2022. In May 2025, as chief prosecutor Karim Ahmad Khan temporarily stepped aside during an investigation into his alleged sexual misconduct, she took charge of the Office of the Prosecutor together with deputy prosecutor Mame Mandiaye Niang.

== US Sanctions ==
On August 20, 2025, Shameem was sanctioned by the Trump administration due to her role in continued investigation into the situation in Palestine.

== Personal life ==
She is married to Aslam Khan, the chief executive officer of Vodafone Fiji. They have two children.

Shameem is the sister of Shaista Shameem, director of the Fiji Human Rights Commission. Her other siblings are Nikhat Shameem, an academic in the field of linguistics, and Raffat Shameem, a cardiologist. Their father was from Multan, Pakistan while their mother was born in Fiji.

== See also ==
- List of first women lawyers and judges in Oceania
