= Federico Villegas (diplomat) =

Argentine political scientist

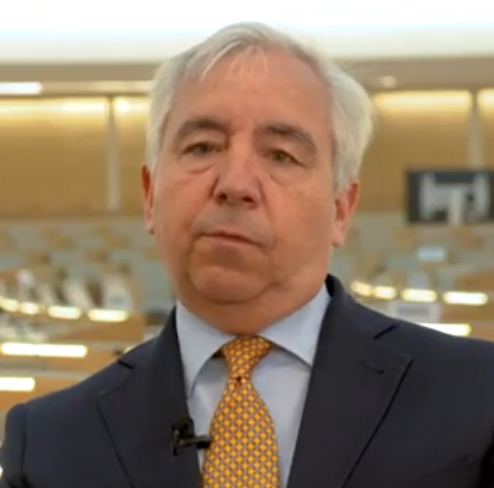
- In a UNOHCHR video in 2022

President of the United Nations Human Rights Council
- In office 1 January 2022 – 31 December 2022
- Preceded by: Nazhat Shameem
- Succeeded by: Václav Bálek

Personal details
- Born: 24 March 1966 (age 60) Santiago del Estero, Argentina
- Education: National University of Rosario; Georgetown University

Federico Villegas Beltrán (born 24 March 1966) is an Argentine career diplomat. He was president of the United Nations Human Rights Council during the year 2022, Permanent Representative of Argentina to the United Nations Office at Geneva from 2020 to 2022, and ambassador of Argentina to Mozambique from 2016 to 2020.

== Early life and education ==
Villegas was born on 24 March 1966 in Santiago del Estero, Argentina. He studied law at the National University of Rosario, graduating in 1989, and later attained a cum laude Master of Arts in Liberal Studies degree from Georgetown University. His final dissertation was on "Co-operative Security in the post-Cold War".

He has taught courses on international public law as an auxiliary professor at the National University of Rosario and at the University of Buenos Aires, and was a visiting faculty at the Walsh School of Foreign Service. He participated in the United Nations Disarmament Fellowship.

== Career ==
Villegas entered the Argentine foreign service in 1993, when he graduated from the Instituto del Servicio Exterior de la Nación (ISEN). From 1993 to 1995, he formed part of the Foreign Ministry's Directorate for International Security, Nuclear and Space Affairs. He additionally served as alternate representative to the Organization of American States from 1995 to 2003. Later, from 2005 to 2007 and from 2012 to 2015, he was the Argentine MFA's Director General for Human Rights.

Villegas headed the Argentine MFA's project to establish the first National Programme against Discrimination, in co-operation with the Office of the United Nations High Commissioner for Human Rights. He was also involved in the establishment of the Mercosur Centre of Human Rights Public Policy (IPPDH) and the UNESCO International Centre for Human Rights, both of which are headquartered in Argentina. In 2016, he was designated as Argentina's first ambassador to Mozambique, serving in the position until 2020. During his tenure, he inaugurated Argentina's diplomatic headquarters in Maputo, and participated in the Disarmament, Demobilization and Reintegration (DDR) programme as Argentina headed the international experts group which led to the 2019 Peace and Reconciliation Accord.

On 6 December 2021, he was elected president of the United Nations Human Rights Council during the year 2022, succeeding Fiji's Nazhat Shameem.
