= Gnädinger =

Gnädinger may refer to:

- Mathias Gnädinger (1941–2015), Swiss actor
- Gnadinger Park in Louisville, Kentucky
