= Angelo Gnaedinger =

Angelo Gnaedinger (born 1951) has been the Director-General of the International Committee of the Red Cross since 1 July 2002. He became a lawyer, and served as magistrate of Schaffhausen. He joined the ICRC in 1984 and worked in the Middle East, Africa, and Europe before assuming the directorship.
