= List of international organization leaders in 2009 =

The following is a list of international organization leaders in 2009.

== UN organizations ==
Organization	Title	Leader	Country	In office	Ref
Food and Agriculture Organization	Director-general	Jacques Diouf	Senegal	1994-2011	
International Atomic Energy Agency	Director-general	Mohamed ElBaradei	Egypt	1997-2009	
International Atomic Energy Agency	Director-general	Yukiya Amano	Japan	2009-2019	
International Civil Aviation Organization	President of the Council	Roberto Kobeh González	Mexico	2006-2013	
International Civil Aviation Organization	Secretary-general	Taïeb Chérif	Algeria	2003-2009	
International Civil Aviation Organization	Secretary-general	Raymond Benjamin	France	2009-2015	
International Labour Organization	Director-general	Juan Somavía	Chile	1999–2012	
United Nations	Secretary-general	Ban Ki-moon	South Korea	2007–2016	
United Nations	President of the General Assembly	Miguel d'Escoto Brockmann	Nicaragua	2008-2009	
United Nations	President of the General Assembly	Ali Abdussalam Treki	Libya	2009-2010	
Security Council members	Member		China, France, Russia, United Kingdom, United States (permanent members); Burkina Faso, Costa Rica, Croatia, Libyan Arab Jamahiriya, Vietnam (elected for 2008–2009); Austria, Japan, Mexico, Turkey, Uganda (elected for 2009–2010)		
United Nations Children's Fund (UNICEF)	Executive director	Ann Veneman	United States	2005–2010	
United Nations Educational, Scientific and Cultural Organization (UNESCO)	Director-general	Kōichirō Matsuura	Japan	1999-2009	
United Nations Educational, Scientific and Cultural Organization (UNESCO)	Director-general	Irina Bokova	Bulgaria	2009–2017	
United Nations High Commissioner for Human Rights	High Commissioner	Navanethem Pillay	South Africa	2008–2014	
United Nations High Commissioner for Refugees (UNHCR)	High Commissioner	António Guterres	Portugal	2005–2015	
United Nations Industrial Development Organization (UNIDO)	Director-general	Kandeh Yumkella	Sierra Leone	2005–2013	
World Food Programme (WFP)	Executive director	Josette Sheeran	United States	2006–2012	
World Health Organization (WHO)	Director-general	Margaret Chan	China	2006–2017	
World Meteorological Organization (WMO)	President	Alexander Bedritsky	Russia	2003–2011	
World Meteorological Organization (WMO)	Secretary-general	Michel Jarraud	France	2004–2015	
World Tourism Organization (UNWTO)	Secretary-general	Francesco Frangialli	Jordan	1997-2009	

== Political and economic organizations ==
Organization	Title	Leader	Country	In office	Ref
African, Caribbean and Pacific Group of States (ACP)	Secretary-general	John Kaputin	Papua New Guinea	2005–2010	
African Union	Chairperson	Jakaya Kikwete	Tanzania	2008-2009	
African Union	Chairperson	Muammar Gaddafi	Libya	2009-2010	
African Union	Chairperson	Bingu wa Mutharika	Malawi	2009–2011	
African Union	Chairperson of the Commission	Jean Ping	Gabon	2008–2012	
African Union	President of the Pan-African Parliament	Idriss Ndélé Moussa	Chad	2009–2012	
Andean Community	Secretary-general	Freddy Ehlers	Ecuador	2007–2010	
Arab League	Secretary-general	Amr Moussa	Egypt	2001–2011	
Arab Maghreb Union	Secretary-general	Habib Ben Yahia	Tunisia	2006–2016	
Asia-Pacific Economic Cooperation (APEC)	Executive director	Michael Tay	Singapore	2009	
Association of Southeast Asian Nations (ASEAN)	Secretary-general	Surin Pitsuwan	Thailand	2008–2012	
Caribbean Community	Secretary-general	Edwin Carrington	Trinidad and Tobago	1992–2010	
Central American Parliament (PARLACEN)	President	Gloria Guadalupe Oquelí Solórzano de Macoto	Honduras	2008-2009	
Central American Parliament (PARLACEN)	President	Jacinto Suárez	Nicaragua	2009–2010	
Common Market of East and Southern Africa (COMESA)	Secretary-general	Sindiso Ngwenya	Zimbabwe	2008-2018	
Commonwealth of Nations	Head	Queen Elizabeth II	United Kingdom	1952–present	
Commonwealth of Nations	Secretary-general	Kamalesh Sharma	India	2008-2016	
Commonwealth of Independent States	Executive secretary	Sergei Lebedev	Russia	2007–present	
Council of Europe	Secretary General	Terry Davis	United Kingdom	2004-2009	
Council of Europe	Secretary General	Maud de Boer-Buquicchio	Netherlands	2019 (acting)	
Council of Europe	Secretary General	Thorbjørn Jagland	Norway	2009-2019	
Council of Europe	President of the Parliamentary Assembly of the Council of Europe (PACE)	Lluís Maria de Puig	Spain	2008–2010	
Council of Europe	President of the European Court of Human Rights	Jean-Paul Costa	France	2007-2011	
East African Community	Secretary-general	Juma Volter Mwapachu	Tanzania	2006–2011	
Economic Community of West African States	President of the Commission	Mohamed Ibn Chambas	Ghana	2007–2010	
Economic Community of West African States	Chairman	Umaru Yar'Adua	Nigeria	2008-2010	
Eurasian Economic Community	Secretary-general	Tair Mansurov	Kazakhstan	2007–2014	
Eurasian Economic Community	Chairman of the Interstate Council	Nursultan Nazarbayev	Kazakhstan	2001-2014	
European Free Trade Association	Secretary-general	Kåre Bryn	Norway	2006–2012	
European Union (EU)	Presidency of the European Council	Mirek Topolánek	Czech Republic	2009	
European Union (EU)	Presidency of the European Council	Jan Fischer	Czech Republic	2009	
European Union (EU)	Presidency of the European Council	Fredrik Reinfeldt	Sweden	2009	
European Union (EU)	Presidency of the European Council	Herman Van Rompuy	Belgium	2009–2014	
European Union (EU)	Presidency of the Council of the European Union		Czech Republic	2009	
European Union (EU)	Presidency of the Council of the European Union		Sweden	2009	
European Union (EU)	President of the European Commission	José Manuel Barroso	Portugal	2004–2014	
European Union (EU)	President of the European Parliament	Hans-Gert Pöttering	Germany	2007-2009	
European Union (EU)	President of the European Parliament	Jerzy Buzek	Poland	2009–2012	
European Union (EU)	Secretary-General of the Council	Javier Solana	Spain	1999-2009	
European Union (EU)	Secretary-General of the Council	Pierre de Boissieu	France	2009-2011	
European Union (EU)	High Representative for the Common Foreign and Security Policy	Javier Solana	Spain	1999-2009	
European Union (EU)	High Representative for the Common Foreign and Security Policy	Catherine Ashton	United Kingdom	2009–2014	
European Union (EU)	President of the European Central Bank	Jean-Claude Trichet	France	2003–2011	
European Union (EU)	European Ombudsman	Nikiforos Diamandouros	Greece	2003–2013	
European Union (EU)	President of the Committee of the Regions (CoR)	Luc Van den Brande	Belgium	2008-2010	
European Union (EU)	President of the European Investment Bank (EIB)	Philippe Maystadt	Belgium	2000–2011	
European Union (EU)	President of the European Court of Justice (ECJ)	Vassilios Skouris	Greece	2003–2015	
European Union (EU)	President of the European Court of Auditors (ECA)	Vítor Manuel da Silva Caldeira	Portugal	2008-2017	
European Union (EU)	President of the Economic and Social Committee (EESC)	Mario Sepi	Italy	2008–2010	
Group of Eight (G8)	President (informal)		Italy	2009	
Gulf Cooperation Council	Secretary-general	Abdul Rahman bin Hamad Al Attiyah	Qatar	2002–2011	
Ibero-American General Secretariat (SEGIB)	Secretary-general	Enrique V. Iglesias	Uruguay	2005–2013	
Indian Ocean Commission	Secretary-general	Callixte d'Offay	Seychelles	2008-2012	
Non-Aligned Movement (NAM)	Chairman	Raúl Castro Cuba	2006-2009		
Non-Aligned Movement (NAM)	Chairman	Hosni Mubarak	Egypt	2009-2011	
Nordic Council	President	Sinikka Bohlin	Sweden	2009	
Nordic Council	Secretary-general	Jan-Erik Enestam	Finland	2007–2013	
North Atlantic Treaty Organization (NATO)	Secretary-general	Jaap de Hoop Scheffer	Denmark	2004-2009	
North Atlantic Treaty Organization (NATO)	Secretary-general	Anders Fogh Rasmussen	Denmark	2009-2014	
Organisation for Economic Co-operation and Development (OECD)	Secretary-general	José Ángel Gurría	Mexico	2006–2021	
Organization for Security and Co-operation in Europe (OSCE)	Secretary-general	Marc Perrin de Brichambaut	France	2005–2011	
Organization for Security and Co-operation in Europe (OSCE)	Chairman-in-Office	Dora Bakoyannis	Greece	2009	
Organization for Security and Co-operation in Europe (OSCE)	Chairman-in-Office	George Papandreou	Greece	2009	
Organization for Security and Co-operation in Europe (OSCE)	High Commissioner on National Minorities	Knut Vollebæk	Norway	2007–2013	
Organization of American States	Secretary-general	José Miguel Insulza	Chile	2005-2015	
Organisation of Eastern Caribbean States	Director-general	Len Ishmael	Saint Lucia	2003–2013	
Organisation of the Islamic Conference (OIC)	Secretary-general	Ekmeleddin Ihsanoglu	Turkey	2005–2013	
Pacific Community (SPC)	Director-general	Jimmie Rodgers	Solomon Islands	2006–2014	
Pacific Islands Forum	Secretary-general	Tuiloma Neroni Slade	Samoa	2008-2014	
Shanghai Cooperation Organisation (SCO)	Secretary-general	Bolat Nurgaliyev	Kazakhstan	2007-2009	
South Asian Association for Regional Cooperation (SAARC)	Secretary-general	Sheel Kant Sharma	India	2008–2011	
Southern Cone Common Market (Mercosur)	Director of the Executive Secretariat	José Manuel Quijano Capurro	Uruguay	2008-2009	
Southern African Development Community	Executive secretary	Tomaz Salomão	Mozambique	2005–2013	
Union of South American Nations (USAN)	President	Michelle Bachelet	Chile	2008-2009 (first President)	
Union of South American Nations (USAN)	President	Rafael Correa	Ecuador	2009–2010	
Unrepresented Nations and Peoples Organization (UNPO)	Secretary-general	Marino Busdachin	Italy	2003-2018	
Western European Union	Secretary-general	Javier Solana	Spain	1999-2009	
Western European Union	Secretary-general	Arnaud Jacomet	France	2009–2011	
World Trade Organization (WTO)	Director-general	Pascal Lamy	France	2005–2013	

== Financial organizations ==
Organization	Title	Leader	Country	In office	Ref
African Development Bank	President	Donald Kaberuka	Rwanda	2005–2015	
Asian Development Bank	President	Haruhiko Kuroda	Japan	2005–2013	
European Bank for Reconstruction and Development	President	Thomas Mirow	Germany	2008-2012	
Inter-American Development Bank (IADB)	President	Luis Alberto Moreno	Colombia	2005–2020	
International Monetary Fund	Managing director	Dominique Strauss-Kahn	France	2007–2011	
Islamic Development Bank (IDB)	President	Ahmed Mohammed Ali Al-Madani	Saudi Arabia	1975–present	
World Bank	President	Robert Zoellick	United States	2007–2012	

== Sports organizations ==
Organization	President	Country	In office	Ref
Asian Football Confederation (AFC)	Mohamed bin Hammam	Qatar	2002–2011	
Badminton World Federation (BWF)	Kang Young-joong	South Korea	2005-2013	
Confédération africaine de football (CAF)	Issa Hayatou	Cameroon	1988-2017	
Confederation of North, Central American and Caribbean Association Football (CONCACAF)	Jack A. Warner	Trinidad and Tobago	1990–2011	
Confederación Sudamericana de Fútbol (CONMEBOL)	Nicolás Leoz	Paraguay	1986–2013	
Fédération internationale de basket-ball	Robert Elphinston	Australia	2006-2010	
Fédération Internationale de Football Association (FIFA)	Sepp Blatter	Switzerland	1998–2015	
Fédération Internationale de Gymnastique (FIG)	Bruno Grandi	Italy	1996-2016	
Fédération internationale de natation (FINA)	Mustapha Larfaoui	Algeria	1988-2009	
Fédération internationale de natation (FINA)	Julio Maglione	Uruguay	2009-2021	
Fédération Internationale de Volleyball (FIVB)	Wei Jizhong	China	2008-2012	
Fédération Internationale des Sociétés d'Aviron (FISA)	Denis Oswald	Switzerland	1989-2014	
Fédération Équestre Internationale (FEI)	Princess Haya bint Hussein	Jordan	2006-2014	
Fédération Internationale d'Escrime (FIE)	Alisher Usmanov	Russia	2008-2022	
International Blind Sports Federation (IBSA)	Michael Barredo	Philippines	2005-2013	
International Association of Athletics Federations	Lamine Diack	Senegal	1999-2015	
International Boxing Association (IBA)	Wu Ching-kuo	Taiwan	2006-2017	
International Cricket Council (ICC)	David Morgan	United Kingdom	2008–2010	
International Handball Federation (IHF)	Hassan Moustafa	Egypt	2000–present	
International Hockey Federation (FIIH)	René Fasel	Switzerland	1994-2021	
International Judo Federation (IJF)	Marius Viser	Romania/Austria	2007–present	
International Olympic Committee (IOC)	Jacques Rogge	Belgium	2001–2013	
International Paralympic Committee (IPC)	Philip Craven	United Kingdom	2001–2017	
International Rugby Board (IRB)	Bernard Lapasset	France	2008–2016	
International Shooting Sport Federation (ISSF)	Olegario Vàzquez Raña	Mexico	1980-2018	
International Table Tennis Federation (ITTF)	Adham Sharara	Canada	1999-2014	
International Tennis Federation (ITF)	Francesco Ricci Bitti	Italy	1999-2015	
International Triathlon Union (ITU)	Marisol Casado	Spain	2008–present	
International Weightlifting Federation (IWF)	Tamás Aján	Hungary	2000-2020	
Oceania Football Confederation (OFC)	Reynald Temarii	Tahiti	2004–2010	
Union Cycliste Internationale (UCI)	Pat McQuaid	Ireland	2005-2013	
Union of European Football Associations (UEFA)	Michel Platini	France	2007-2015	
Union Internationale de Pentathlon Moderne (UIPM)	Klaus Schormann	Germany	1992–present	
United World Wrestling (UWW)	Raphaël Martinetti	Switzerland	2002-2013	
World Archery Federation	Uğur Erdener	Turkey	2005–present	
International Rugby Board	Bernard Lapasset	France	2008-2016	
International Sailing Federation (ISAF)	Göran Petersson	Sweden	2004-2012	
World Taekwondo Federation (WTF)	Chungwon Choue	South Korea	2004–present	

== Other organizations ==
Organization	Title	Leader	Country	In office	Ref
Antarctic Treaty	Executive secretary	Jan Huber	Netherlands	2004-2009 (first Executive Secretary)	
Antarctic Treaty	Executive secretary	Manfred Reinke	Germany	2009-2017	
Colombo Plan	Secretary-general	Patricia Yoon-Moi Chia	Malaysia	2007–2011	
Community of Portuguese Language Countries (CPLP)	Executive secretary	Domingos Simões Pereira	Guinea-Bissau	2008–2012	
La Francophonie	Secretary-general	Abdou Diouf	Senegal	2003–2014	
Intergovernmental Authority on Development (IGAD)	Executive secretary	Mahboub Maalim	Kenya	2008–2019	
International Committee of the Red Cross	President	Jakob Kellenberger	Switzerland	2000–2012	
International Court of Justice	Presidents	Rosalyn Higgins	United Kingdom	2006-2009	
International Court of Justice	Presidents	Hisashi Owada	Japan	2009-2012	
International Criminal Court	President	Philippe Kirsch	Canada	2003-2009 (first President)	
International Criminal Court	President	Song Sang-Hyun	South Korea	2009–2015	
International Criminal Police Organization (Interpol)	Secretary-general	Ronald Noble	United States	2000-2014	
International Criminal Police Organization (Interpol)	President	Khoo Boon Hui	Singapore	2008–2012	
International Federation of Red Cross and Red Crescent Societies (IFRC)	President	Juan Manuel Suárez Del Toro Rivero	Spain	2001-2009	
International Federation of Red Cross and Red Crescent Societies (IFRC)	President	Tadateru Konoe	Japan	2009–2017	
International Maritime Organization	Secretary-general	Efthimios E. Mitropoulos	Greece	2004–2011	
International Organization for Migration (IOM)	Director-general	William Lacy Swing	United States	2008–2018	
International Telecommunication Union	Secretary-general	Hamadoun Touré	Mali	2007–2014	
Organisation for the Prohibition of Chemical Weapons (OPCW)	Director-general	Rogelio Pfirter	Argentina	2002–2010	
Organization of the Petroleum Exporting Countries (OPEC)	Secretary-general	Abdallah Salem el-Badri	Libya	2007–2016	
Universal Postal Union	Director-general	Édouard Dayan	France	2005–2013	
World Intellectual Property Organization (WIPO)	Director-general	Francis Gurry	Australia	2008–2020	

== See also ==
- List of state leaders in 2009
- List of religious leaders in 2009
- List of international organization leaders in 2008
- List of international organization leaders in 2010
