= Carrard =

Carrard is a surname. Notable people with the surname include:

- François Carrard (1938–2022), Swiss sports administrator
- Olivier Carrard (born 1956), Swiss fencer
- Valérie Piller Carrard (born 1978), Swiss politician
