= Nahema Temarii =

French Polynesian politician

Minister of Youth and Sports
- Incumbent
- Assumed office 15 May 2023
- President: Moetai Brotherson
- Preceded by: Naea Bennett

Personal details
- Born: 1990 or 1991 (age 34–35)
- Party: Tāvini Huiraʻatira

Nahema Temarii is a French Polynesian politician and Cabinet Minister. She is the daughter of former sports minister and FIFA vice-president Reynald Temarii. She is a member of Tāvini Huiraʻatira.

Temarii worked for FIFA and TNTV before setting up her own communications and digital marketing company.

On 15 May 2023 she was appointed Minister of Youth, Sports, and Crime Prevention in the government of Moetai Brotherson.
