= François Carrard =

Swiss sports administrator (1938–2022)

François Carrard was a Swiss lawyer and sports administrator who was the first Director-General of the International Olympic Committee. He held the position from 1989 to 2003. Thomas Bach, President of the International Olympic Committee, described him as “one of the pillars of the phenomenon that is modern sport”.

Carrard was also a leading figure in the creation of the World Anti-Doping Agency and advised various international sports federations, including the International Swimming Federation (FINA), FIFA, and the International Boxing Association. He was also chairman of the Montreux Jazz Artists Foundation and the Beau Rivage Palace hotel.

He was born in Lausanne in 1938 and died on 9 January 2022 aged 83.

Carrard's posthumous autobiography, 'By The Way', was published by Chiselbury in April 2024.
