= Reynald Temarii =

Tahitian footballer and politician (born 1967)

Minister for Youth and Sports
- In office 1997–2004
- President: Gaston Flosse

Personal details
- Born: 2 June 1967 (age 59) Papeete, French Polynesia
- Party: Tahoera'a Huiraatira

Ariitu Reynald Temarii (born 2 June 1967) is a French Polynesian former footballer, sports administrator, politician, and Cabinet Minister who served in the cabinet of Gaston Flosse. From 2004 to 2010 he was president of the Oceania Football Confederation, and from 2007 to 2010 a vice-president of FIFA. He is the father of politician Nahema Temarii.

== Biography ==
A midfielder, Temarii began his football career at A.S. Jeunes Tahitiens, where they clinched a Tahiti First Division title in 1987. He left for France to continue his football career at FC Nantes between 1988 and 1990. He returned to French Polynesia in the early 1990s, where he played for A.S. Vénus and A.S. Pirae, winning the Tahitian top-flight title with both teams. In 1995, he was the captain of the Tahiti team that won the gold medal in the 1995 South Pacific Games.

Between 1997 and 2004 he was the youth and sports minister in the Tahoera'a Huiraatira government of Gaston Flosse, before being elected president of the Oceania Football Confederation. He was re-elected in 2007, also being selected as a FIFA Vice President. In late 2004 he was appointed chair of the board of Tahiti Nui TV. The appointment was rescinded less than a month later, and Temarii subsequently left the Tahoera'a and launched his own political party, Porinetia Ora.

== Corruption allegations ==
As a member of the FIFA executive committee, Temarii had one of the 57 votes in the election for the venue of the World Cup. In the 2018 and 2022 host ballots, it was reported in the Sunday Times that Temarii had said his vote had been influenced by the construction of a football academy in his country. Reynald denied the allegations, saying his comments had been taken out of context. He was suspended from FIFA while investigations against him were carried out, and removed from his OFC position, being replaced by David Chung. In November 2010 he was banned from all soccer activities for a year and banned him from future voting on world cup bids. He appealed the ruling, resulting in the OFC losing its world cup voting rights. His appeal was rejected in February 2011.

In June 2014 the Sunday Times made further allegations of bribery, alleging that Temarii had been paid 305,000 Euros by Qatari football official Mohamed Bin Hammam. The allegations were investigated by FIFA, and in May 2015 Temarii was suspended from all national and international football activities for eight years for breaches of FIFA's ethics codes. Following the ruling he resigned as general manager of the Tahitian Football Federation.

In April 2017 the National Financial Prosecutor's Office opened an investigation into Temarii for corruption, criminal association and influence peddling. In November 2017 he was detained for questioning as part of the investigation. In May 2023 he was charged with corruption.

== Honours ==
In October 2013 he was made a knight of the Order of Tahiti Nui for his coordination of the 2013 FIFA Beach Soccer World Cup.
