= Sheel Kant Sharma =

Indian diplomat

9th SAARC Secretary General
- In office 1 March 2008 – 28 February 2011
- Preceded by: Chenkyab Dorji
- Succeeded by: Fathimath Dhiyana Saeed

Sheel Kant Sharma was the ninth Secretary General of the South Asian Association for Regional Cooperation (SAARC), serving from 2008 to 2011. He is an expert on energy, and was formerly Indian envoy to Austria.

== Academic background ==
Master of Science (Nuclear Physics) from Indian Institute of Technology (IIT), Mumbai (1971). Ph.D. (High Energy Physics) from Indian Institute of Technology (IIT), Mumbai (1974).

Professional Background:

July 1973	Joined Indian Foreign Service
1976–77	Served as Third Secretary/Second Secretary in Kuwait/Saudi Arabia
1978–81	Under Secretary in the Middle East desk, Ministry of External Affairs covering at various stages countries from Iran, Iraq to North Africa
1981–82	Fellow in the Institute for Defense Studies and Analyses (IDSA), N. Delhi
1982–83	Deputy Secretary (North), Ministry of External Affairs, dealing with Nepal and Bhutan.
1983–86	First Secretary (Disarmament), Permanent Mission of India, Geneva and Alternate Representative of India to UN Conference on Disarmament.
1986–89	Counsellor and Deputy Chief of Mission, Embassy of India, Algiers
1989–91	Director (United Nations Division) and Disarmament Head, Ministry of External Affairs, New Delhi
1991–94	Joint Secretary (South & Disarmament), Ministry of External Affairs in-charge of India's relations with ASEAN, Indo-China and South Pacific.
1994–2000	Seconded to the International Atomic Energy Agency, Vienna for the post of senior professional in External Relations & Policy Coordination Division, for a job as international civil servant.
Sept.2000 – July 2003	Returned to MEA in India as Joint Secretary (Disarmament & International Security Affairs), covering all disarmament issues, bilateral security dialogues and dialogues on nuclear non-proliferation, export controls and defence Cooperation, security forums such as ARF, CICA, UNSC and other ad hoc groupings on security issues such as Pugwash.
July 2003 – July 2004	Additional Secretary (International Organisations), Ministry of External Affairs with previous charge expanded to include other international organisations.
28 July 2004 – February 2008	Ambassador of India to Austria and Permanent Representative of India to all international organisations in Vienna.
1 March 2008 – 28 February 2011	Secretary General of SAARC.

== Publications ==
Research articles co-authored in Physical Review-D (1971), Physical Review Letters (1972) Articles in newspapers and periodicals (Times of India, Mainstream and Sunday) during 1981–82 on nuclear disarmament issues As Member of the UN Study Group on Verification (1989–91) co-authored the UN Report on Verification in 1991 As Member of the UN Study Group on Defensive Security Concepts (1991–93), co-authored the UN Report on Defensive Security Concepts Wrote a UNIDIR Monograph on Verification of Fissile Materials Cut-Off and Non-use of Nuclear Weapons (1992) Article in the IAEA Bulletin – 1995 Paper presented at the Pugwash Conference on Energy in Malta (1995) Co-authored UN panel's report on missile in all their aspects in 2002

Conferences attended as representative of India/delegate: Non-Aligned Summit, New Delhi (1983) Kuala Lumpur (2003), Annual Six Nation Summits on Nuclear Disarmament (1985–89) Conference on Disarmament (1983–86) United Nations General Assembly (1983–86, 2000- 2003) U.N. Disarmament Commission (1984–86, 2001) UN Conference Rio+5 (1997) IAEA General Conference (1994–99) and since 2004 International Conferences on Nuclear and Energy Issues (1994–99) ARF Ministerial Meetings (2000–04)

Languages: French and Arabic
