= Wu Ching-kuo =

Taiwanese sports official

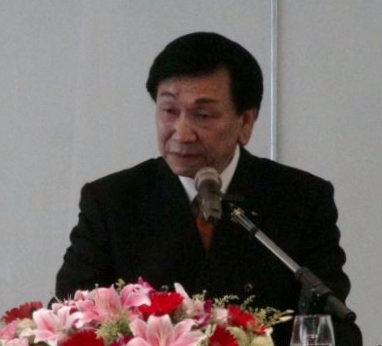
- Mr. Wu Ching-kuo announced his run for the President of the International Olympic Committee in Taipei, Taiwan, in May 2013.

Executive board member of the International Olympic Committee
- In office 23 May 2012 – 7 February 2018
- IOC President: Jacques Rogge (2012-13); Thomas Bach (2012-20)
- Preceded by: Denis Oswald
- Succeeded by: Nenad Lalović

President of the International Boxing Association
- In office 2006 – November 2017
- Preceded by: Caner Doğaneli
- Succeeded by: Gafur Rakhimov

Personal details
- Born: 18 October 1946 (age 80) Nanjing, Jiangsu, China
- Education: Tunghai University, Oxford Brookes University, University of Liverpool
- Occupation: Sports administrator

Wu Ching-kuo (Chinese: 吳經國; pinyin: Wú Jīngguó; born October 18, 1946) is a Taiwanese sports executive who was the president of the International Boxing Association (AIBA), a post he held from 2006 to 2017. He resigned from his position in November 2017.

Having been a member of the International Olympic Committee since 1988 (and thus representing the IOC in Taiwan, participating as Chinese Taipei), he was elected to its executive board in 2012.

After serious allegations of financial mismanagement and accounting irregularities were made against Wu, a motion was passed against him by AIBA's executive committee at a meeting in Moscow in July 2017. Members of AIBA's governing body called for an Extraordinary Congress within 3 months to table a no-confidence motion against the AIBA president. It set up an Interim Management Committee to prevent Wu from having any further financial control over AIBA.

Wu claimed that this was "political maneuvering" and refused to step down. However, with the boxing world in uproar over the financial mismanagement under Wu's watch, he had no option but to resign in November 2017.

== Career ==
Wu was a basketball player in his youth and later worked as an architect.

Wu became Taiwan's representative on the International Olympic Committee (IOC) in 1988. He served as a member of the evaluation commission for the 2016 Summer Olympics.

=== International Boxing Association ===
In November 2006 Wu won a vote 83 to 79 to replace 84-year-old Anwar Chowdhry of Pakistan to serve as AIBA's head for the next four years. When serving as an AIBA committee chairman, he proposed reforms such as increased marketing, new television contracts and the installation of scoreboards to allow fans to see how judges score fights in real time.

After his election, Wu let Price Waterhouse Coopers check the AIBA finances. Turkish General Secretary Caner Doganeli was soon suspended in February 2007 and the ethics commission headed by François Carrard discussed financial irregularities charges against Doganeli.

=== 2013 candidacy for IOC President ===
On May 23, 2013, Wu confirmed that he would run for President of the IOC. He has served as an IOC member since 1988. At the 125th IOC Session in Buenos Aires he lost the election to Thomas Bach.

As the president of AIBA, Wu believed Cuba's historic first professional boxing bout in more than 50 years proves yet again to IOC members that he can deliver. He stated that he was proud to have been the facilitator of engineering the Cuban return to the professional boxing circuit.

During Wu's seventh trip to Africa in less than 10 years, he has established a relationship with his African colleagues since he became an IOC member 25 years ago, the longest tenure of any of the six hopefuls, he said “The Olympic Games have taken place on all five continents but Africa, and therefore I will do my utmost to help bring about an African Games.”

=== Response to Olympic controversy ===
There were two highly controversial decisions in the 2016 Summer Olympics where the widely regarded winners of the matches were judged to have actually lost the match. One of them responded by showing the judges his middle finger. Instead of promising to look into the issue concerning the judges and making public statements about cleaning up his organization Wu responded with the following to AP journalist Greg Beacham:

"He immediately showed his finger to the referee-judges. The IOC says this is totally unacceptable. You cannot humiliate people. They are officials. He put himself in a difficult position, I can tell you. A lot of disciplinary action will follow. You should show proper behaviour. If you are not happy about the result, you cannot humiliate in public our referee-judges. So that has already drawn a lot of people's attention who want to punish him. So we are going to have a disciplinary commission for the case."

A senior boxing official was quoted as saying that there is deep-rooted corruption in Olympic boxing, which led to controversial decisions. “As predicted, corruption is alive and well and the decisions speak for themselves. It is clear that the AIBA will not do anything about this. It is time now for the IOC to step in,” the senior official told the Guardian, adding that amateur boxing is so rotten that only the removal of Wu, his administration and all of the officials at the Olympics could cut it out. “President Wu needs to resign, as well as the executive director and the senior staff. Every RJ [referee and judge] and ITO [international technical official] needs to be suspended. That’s the only way it’s going to change,” the official said.

US head coach Billy Walsh was quoted by the Guardian as saying that he believed the decisions made at these Olympics were the worst since Roy Jones Jr infamously lost a light-middleweight final in 1988 that became a byword for scandal.

=== Financial allegations against Wu ===
Under Wu, AIBA faces the risk of bankruptcy after investors demanded it immediately pays back millions of pounds in loans and investments it does not have. Azerbaijani company Benkons has sent a letter, demanding AIBA immediately repay a $10 million loan from 2011. That is over $2 million more than AIBA has in its accounts. Benkons insists any claims by AIBA that a repayment schedule has been agreed are “false” – and they rejected such a proposal earlier in 2017. Hong Kong investor FCIT has also sent a legal notice to AIBA, demanding its CHF 19 million loan back.

AIBA has also received large investments from Chinese companies AliSports and FCIT, with the money largely going towards meeting operational and legal expenses. International auditor KPMG refused to certify the accounts for two years 2015–2016, but finally signed these in April 2017 only after AIBA claimed its revenues would improve and promised a $10m loan repayment plan had been agreed with Benkons. This claim has now turned out to be untrue, creating the risk that KPMG will not certify the next accounts.

In October 2018, AIBA banned Wu from involvement in amateur boxing for life, for gross negligence and financial mismanagement of AIBA affairs and finances.

Preceded by (Turkey) Caner Doganeli	AIBA President; 2007 – 2017	Succeeded by (Uzbekistan) Gafur Rakhimov

Preceded by Caner Doğaneli	President of the IBA; 2006–2017	Succeeded by Gafur Rakhimov
