= Taleb Rifai =

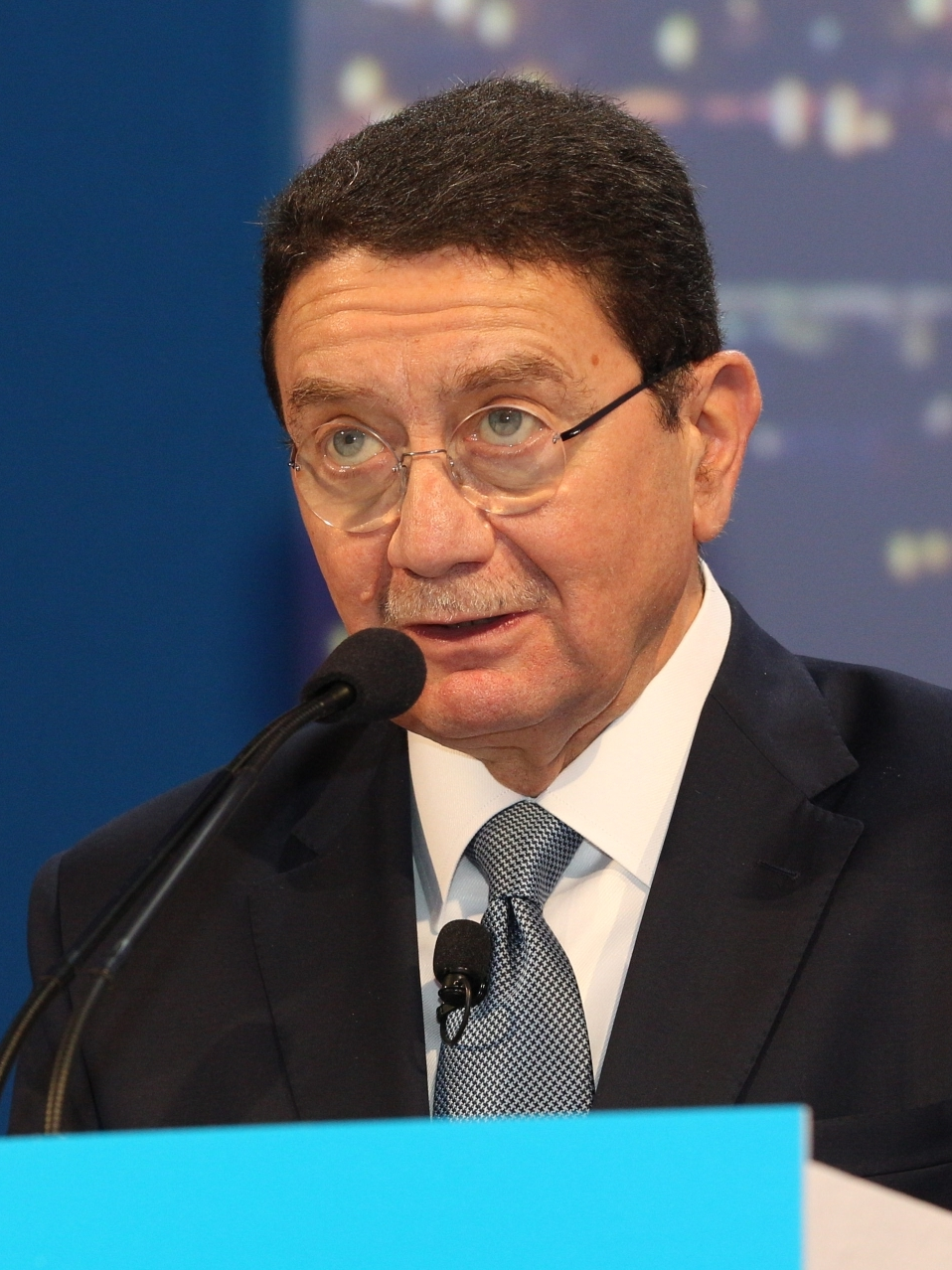
Taleb Rifai

Taleb Rifai (born 1949) is a Jordanian businessman and politician, who was the Secretary-General of the United Nations' World Tourism Organization between 2010 and 2017. He was the first Jordanian to hold a UN agency Secretary General position.

== Professional background ==
=== Early career ===
After completing his B.S. in Architectural Engineering from the University of Cairo in 1973, Rifai went on to attain a master's degree in Engineering and Architecture from the Illinois Institute of Technology (IIT) in Chicago, United States in 1979. In 1983, he received his PhD in Urban Design and Regional Planning from the University of Pennsylvania.

From 1973 to 1993, Rifai was a professor of architecture at the University of Jordan in Amman. From 1993 to 1995, Rifai headed Jordan's first Economic Mission to Washington DC, promoting trade, investments, and economic relations between Jordan and the United States. Rifai was also actively involved in policy making and developing investment strategies as Director General of the Investment Promotion Corporation (IPC) in Jordan (1995–1997).

In the three years preceding his service in the Jordanian Cabinet, he was appointed the CEO of Jordan's Cement Company, one of the country's largest public shareholding companies with over 4,000 employees. During his term he successfully led the first large-scale privatization and restructuring scheme in Jordan, by bringing in the French cement company Lafarge in 1998 and continued to serve as CEO under the new Lafarge management. From 1999 to 2003, he served in several ministerial portfolios in the Government of Jordan. First, he was appointed Minister of Planning and International Cooperation, in charge of Jordan's Development Agenda and bilateral and multilateral relationships with donors and agencies. He was subsequently appointed Minister of Information, the spokesman of the Government of Jordan, as well as being in charge of communications and public media. During his tenure, he embarked on restructuring public media and in particular the Jordan Television Network.

In 2001, his portfolio was expanded to include the Ministry of Tourism and Antiquity, where he established Jordan's first Archaeological Park in the ancient city of Petra in collaboration with UNESCO and the World Bank. He also realized several large projects in Jerash, the Dead Sea and Wadi Rum. As Minister of Tourism, he was the Chairman of the Jordan Tourism Board, President of the Amman School for Tourism and Hospitality and was elected Chairman of the Executive Council of UNWTO in 2001.

Prior to assuming his post at the UNWTO, Taleb Rifai was the Assistant Director-General of the International Labour Organization (ILO) for three consecutive years. His responsibilities included the overall supervision and implementation of the International Labor Standards, as well as advising on labor markets and employment policies, particularly in the Middle East region.

=== UNWTO ===
Taleb Rifai served as the Deputy Secretary-General of the World Tourism Organization (UNWTO) from February 2006 to February 2009, at which point he took over the role of Secretary-General ad interim on 1 March 2009. Rifai was selected as the official candidate to be presented to entire 155 member inter-governmental body on 12 May 2009, receiving 20 out of 31 votes. Korean Dr. Oh Jee-Chul, from the Korea Tourism Organization (KTO), received 10 out of the 11 remaining votes, with the final single vote being given to Mr. Khalid Malik, the Pakistani UN Resident Coordinator in China. The fourth candidate, Mr. Arab Hoballah, the Chief of Sustainable Consumption and Production in the UN Environment Program of Lebanon, withdrew. In October 2009, Rifai was unanimously elected by the entire body, and began his four-year term on 1 January 2010.

He was elected for a second four-year term, starting in January 2014, by the 20th Session of UNWTO General Assembly in August 2013 and served in that capacity through 2017. In his Statement of Intent and Management for the period 2014–2017, Rifai expressed his sense of gratitude and accomplishment looking back at his first term as UNWTO Secretary-General, and outlined the focus for his current term: Travel and Tourism's contributions and responsibilities in a rapidly changing global scene, UNWTO leading the Travel and Tourism Agenda, and the assessment of the reform process UNWTO underwent between 2009 and 2013. Zurab Pololikashvili, Ambassador of Georgia to Spain, Morocco, Algeria and Andorra, was appointed as Rifai's successor as Secretary General of the UNWTO for the period 2018–2021.

== Current Positions ==
- Member of Advisory Council - Air B&B
- Ambassador - World Travel and Tourism Council (WTTC)
- Member of Board of Trustees - Mediterranean Tourism Foundation (MTF)
- Patron - African Tourism Board (ATB)
- Chairman - International Institute for Peace Through Tourism (IIPT)
- Chairman - The International Tourism & Investment Conference (ITIC)
- Chairman - United Nations Institute for Training & Research (UNITAR), CIFAL Malaga
- Co-Chairman - International Tourism Resilience & Crises Management (ICTRCM)
- Vice Chairman - Board of Trustees - Middle East University (MEU)
- Vice Chairman - International Sports & Tourism Organization (ISTO)
- Special Advisor - Adventure Travel Trade Association (ATTA)

== Honours ==
- Grand Cordon of the Order of the Rising Sun (2018)
- Order of the Two Niles (2016)
