= David Chung (football executive) =

Malaysian-Papua New Guinean sports official (born 1962)

Senior Vice President of FIFA
- In office 5 September 2017 – 8 April 2018
- President: Gianni Infantino
- Preceded by: Ángel María Villar
- Succeeded by: Salman bin Ibrahim Al Khalifa

Personal details
- Born: Chung Kim Hiong; 13 July 1962 (age 64) Malaysia
- Awards: Order of the British Empire

David Chung OBE (born Chung Kim Hiong, 13 July 1962) is a Malaysian-Papua New Guinean sports official. He served as President of the Papua New Guinea Football Association (PNGFA) from 2004 to 2018, as president of the Oceania Football Confederation (OFC) between 2011 and 2018, and was a member of the FIFA Council in 2017 and 2018.

== Biography ==
Chung moved from Malaysia to Papua New Guinea in 1985 and later became a naturalised citizen. Initially involved in rugby league, he transitioned to association football as a player, coach, referee, and administrator. While working in the New Guinea Highlands, he secured external funding and contributed personal resources to youth development programmes.

He was elected President of the Papua New Guinea Football Association in 2004. In 2007, he became Senior Vice-president of the Oceania Football Confederation (OFC) under President Reynald Temarii. Following Temarii's suspension by the FIFA Ethics Committee over corruption allegations in November 2010, Chung was appointed Acting President, with New Zealand's Fred de Jong as Senior Vice-president. He was elected unopposed as OFC President in January 2011 for a four-year term.

Chung played a key role in launching Papua New Guinea’s first semi-professional football competition, the Papua New Guinea National Soccer League, in 2006. He also contributed to grassroots football development, supported women’s football, and oversaw infrastructure projects, including a national football academy in Lae and a regional technical centre in Kimbe, with plans for another in Port Moresby.

In July 2012, Chung was appointed an Officer of the Order of the British Empire in the Queen’s Birthday Honours.

On 6 April 2018, Chung resigned as OFC President, PNGFA President, and from the FIFA Council, citing personal reasons. In March 2019, he was fined 100,000 Swiss francs (£76,000) and banned from all football-related activities for six-and-a-half years after being found guilty of corruption.
