= Roberto Kobeh González =

Mexican engineer and politician

- Born: October 18, 1943 (age 82)
- Education: Instituto Politécnico Nacional
- Engineering career
- Institutions: International Civil Aviation Organization
- Employer: Instituto Politécnico Nacional

Roberto Kobeh González (born 18 October 1943 in Huixtla, Chiapas) is a Mexican engineer and politician, formerly the President of the Council of the International Civil Aviation Organization (ICAO) was in office from 1 August 2006 until 1 January 2014.

He graduated from Instituto Politécnico Nacional, in Mexico in 1965 and started his career in the same institution after his graduation as a professor of Electronic Engineering. He was assigned as director of SENEAM, the Mexican organization for air traffic control and aeronautical navigation and communications from 1978 to 1997.

In 1998, he became the representative of Mexico in ICAO, then Vice President of the organization. On 2 March 2006, he was elected to take over the presidency of the ICAO at the end of the term of the long-running president, Assad Kotaite starting 1 August 2006. Kotaite had been in the position for thirty years, from 1976 to 2006.

Kobeh González was re-elected on 19 November 2007 and again on 15 November 2010.
