= Tamás Aján =

International Olympic Committee member

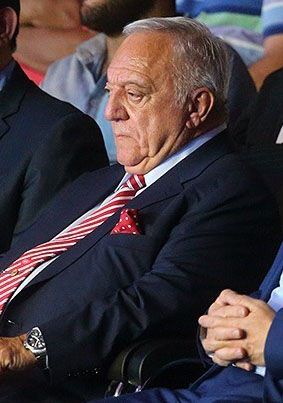
- Aján in Tehran - June 2016

President of the International Weightlifting Federation
- In office 2000 – 15 April 2020

Personal details
- Born: 12 January 1939 (age 87) Gherla, Romania

Tamás Aján (born 12 January 1939) is the former President of the International Weightlifting Federation from 2000 to 2020 and formerly a member of the International Olympic Committee until 2010.

== Early life and career ==
Born in Gherla (Szamosújvár), Romania into an ethnic Hungarian family. Aján graduated from the Budapest University of Physical Education in 1964 with a Ph.D. in physical education. He had a varied career in the Department of Sports and Ministry of Sports and Physical Education, as well as a number of academic posts.

He was the Secretary General of the Hungarian Olympic Committee from 1989 to 2005. From 1975 to 2000 he was Secretary General of the International Weightlifting Federation, and was the Federation's president from 2000 to 2020. As President, he was elected to the IOC in 2000. He has also served as a council member of the World Anti-Doping Agency.

He is also Vice President of the General Association of International Sports Federations (GAISF).

In 2010 he received the Olympic Order on 28 February 2010 in Vancouver, British Columbia, Canada, this is awarded to individuals for particularly distinguished contribution to the Olympic Movement.

Tamas Ajan married Marta Ajan in 1969 and they had 3 kids together: Andrea, Anita and Attila. He now also has 3 grandchildren: Panni Alexandra (2009), Emma Elizabeth (2014) and Milan (2021).

== Corruption scandal ==
In January 2020, an undercover documentary aired on German TV which made serious allegations of financial malpractice and corruption of Anti-Doping Procedures against Aján. This led to him resigning as an IOC honorary member and temporarily stepping aside as president whilst an investigation, headed by professor Richard McLaren, was carried out. In a leaked email after stepping aside, it was alleged that Aján had made 'insults and implicit threats' to IWF interim-president Ursula Papandrea, including to have her arrested. He was also accused of taking part in conference calls, obstructing access to IWF bank accounts, overseeing a bank transfer, conducting “business as usual” with the IWF Secretariat in Budapest and interfering in the timing and venue of Board meetings all when he should not have done.

On 15 April 2020, Aján resigned as President of the International Weightlifting Federation. Shortly before he resigned, it was claimed that Aján had withdrawn his annual salary of $413,000 plus a further $7,100 from the accounts of the IWF to his personal accounts, even though he was not authorised to do so.

On 4 June 2020, professor Richard McLaren's independent report was published. The report stated that Aján operated a 'culture of fear' in his pursuit of 'absolute control' of the IWF. Aján was the General Secretary of the IWF between 1975 and 2000 however, the report said that he was the de facto President without the title during this time. This was demonstrated in 1982 when the IWF headquarters moved from Austria to Aján's country Hungary, despite the fact that the President was Austrian. The culture of fear was so strong that many IWF members refused to co-operate with the investigation and many of Aján's supporters had gained their positions in the IWF's executive board through vote-buying and bribes. Aján himself was said to have gained his re-election as president through vote buying on multiple occasions and his own son-in-law was the Director General of the IWF at the time of the investigation. The report stated that nowhere in the IWF constitution is there a position for a Director General as Aján created the position himself in 2014. The reports findings also concluded that Aján personally collected all anti-doping violation fines and that there was around $10.5 million unaccounted for in the IWF's accounts, as well as 41 positive doping tests that were covered up and 130 that were never processed, including two athletes who had won gold and silver medals at world championships. One instance in the report stated that members from the Albanian Weightlifting Federation drove from Tirana to Budapest with nearly $75,000 cash to pay an Anti-Doping fine to Aján so that Albania would not be banned from competing at the 2016 Olympics. Carrying such amounts of money over the border and not declaring it is a violation of Albanian law. All Anti-Doping information was passed to the World Anti-Doping Agency for investigation.

In June 2021, Aján was officially charged with complicity and tampering with multiple ADRV's by the International Testing Agency along with other high ranking Weightlifting officials Nicu Vlad and Hasan Akkus. Aján and Vlad were later banned from weightlifting for life in June 2022 for their roles in covering up doping offences.
