= Kang Young-joong =

South Korean businessperson

- Born: July 27, 1949 (age 77); Jinju, South Gyeongsang
- Known for: Chairman of Daekyo Group

Korean name
- Hangul: 강영중
- Hanja: 姜榮中
- RR: Gang Yeongjung
- MR: Kang Yŏngjung

Kang Young-joong (Korean: 강영중; Hanja: 姜榮中; born July 27, 1949), the chairman of Daekyo Group, the largest private tutoring company in Korea, served as the President of the Korea Scout Association from March 7, 2008 to April 16, 2012.

In 2025, Kang resigned as a director of Daekyo after nearly 50 years of service.

== Background ==
Kang served as the Badminton World Federation president from 2005 to 2013. On March 23, 2015, he was inaugurated the fourth President of the Korea Sports Safety Foundation.

In 2011, he was awarded the highest distinction of the Scout Association of Japan, the Golden Pheasant Award.
