= Kåre Bryn =

Norwegian diplomat (born 1944)

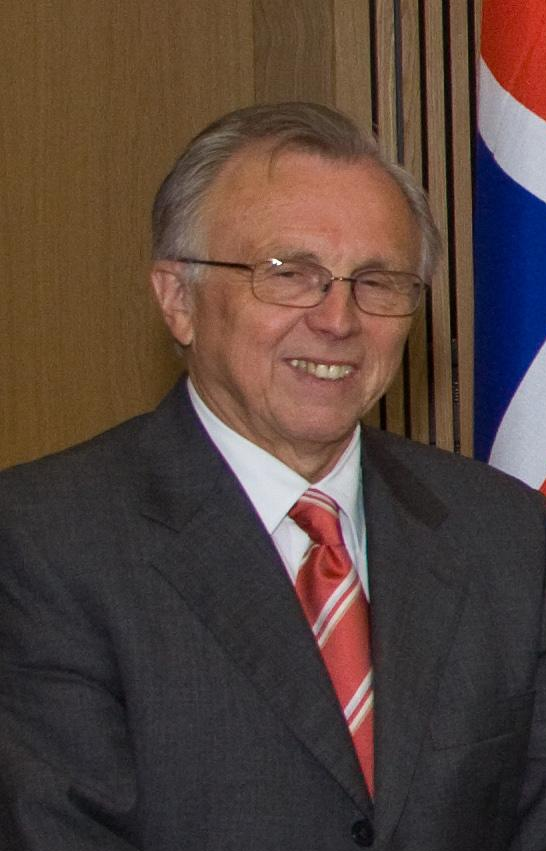
Kåre Bryn (June 2011)

Kåre Bryn (born 12 March 1944) is a Norwegian diplomat.

He was born on the island of Smøla in Nordmøre, Norway. He received a siv.øk. degree and started working for the Norwegian Ministry of Foreign Affairs in 1969, and was promoted to deputy under-secretary of state in 1989. He remained here until 1999, when he became Norwegian ambassador to the European Free Trade Association and the World Trade Organization. From 2003 to 2005 he served as the Norwegian ambassador to the Netherlands. He then became secretary-general of the European Free Trade Association. Before retiring, he served one last year as senior adviser in the Ministry of Foreign Affairs from 2012 to 2013.

In 1999 he was decorated as a Commander of the Royal Norwegian Order of St. Olav.
