= Göran Petersson =

Swedish lawyer, sailor and sports official

Personal information
- Full name: Göran Krister Petersson
- Born: 2 July 1942 (age 84) Gothenburg, Sweden

Sailing career
- Sport: Sailing
- Class(es): 505, Dragon

Göran Krister Petersson (born 2 July 1942) is a Swedish lawyer, sailor and sports official.

Born in Gothenburg, Petersson grew a sailing interest in his youth. A sailor in the 505 and Dragon classes, he has won a Swedish championship in 505.

Petersson got his law degree (jur. kand.) from Lund University in 1967, and has been a lawyer since 1977. He worked until his retirement at Advokatfirman Vinge in Gothenburg.

Petersson was a four-time member of the international jury for the sailing competitions at the Summer Olympics; he was a member of the 1980 and 1984 juries, and chairman of the 1992 and 1996 international juries. He also was chairman of the jury for the 1992 America's Cup.

During the period 2004–2012 Petersson was the president of the International Sailing Federation (ISAF), where he succeeded Paul Henderson. He was succeeded by Carlo Croce.

During the period 2009–2017, he was a member of the International Olympic Committee (IOC).

In 1995, he was awarded H. M. The King's Medal of the 8th size for his contributions to the sport of sailing. In 2022, Petersson was inducted in the Swedish Sailing Federation's Sailing Hall of Fame as its 15th inductee.
