= Vítor Manuel da Silva Caldeira =

Former President of the Portuguese and European Courts of Auditors

Vítor Manuel da Silva Caldeira GCC, GCIH
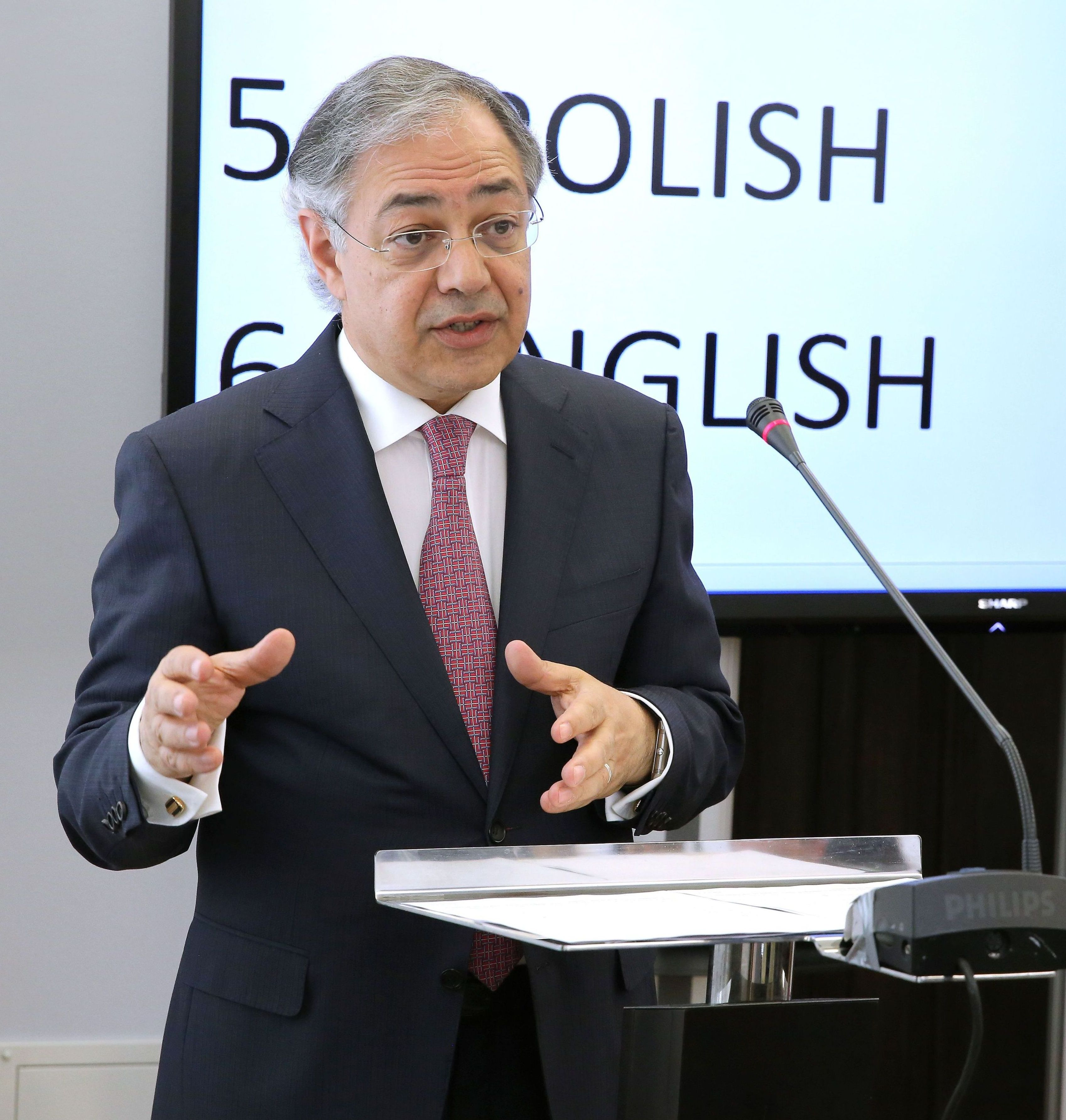
- Vítor Manuel da Silva Caldeira in the Polish Senate (2015)

President of the European Court of Auditors
- In office 16 January 2008 – 30 September 2016
- Preceded by: Hubert Weber
- Succeeded by: Klaus-Heiner Lehne

Member of the European Court of Auditors for Portugal
- In office 1 March 2000 – 30 September 2016
- President: Jan O. Karlsson; Juan Manuel Fabra Vallés; Hubert Weber; Himself
- Preceded by: Armindo de Jesus de Sousa Ribeiro
- Succeeded by: João Figueiredo

Personal details
- Born: 2 January 1960 (age 66) Campo Maior, Portugal
- Children: 2

Vítor Manuel da Silva Caldeira (born 2 January 1960) is a Portuguese auditor who served as President of the Portuguese Court of Auditors from 2016 to 2020 and as President of the European Court of Auditors from 2008 to 2016. He was born in Campo Maior, Portugal.

He has a degree in Law from the University of Lisbon and a postgraduate degree in European Studies from the European Institute of the Faculty of Law at that university.

He was an assistant professor at the Faculty of Law of Lisbon University from 1983 to 1984, and he worked at the Inspectorate General of Finance at the Portuguese Ministry of Finance from 1984 to 2000. From 1996 to 1999 he was an assistant professor at the Higher Institute of the New Professions.

Caldeira was elected President of the European Court of Auditors for a term of three years from 16 January 2008. His mandate was renewed on 12 January 2011 for a second term, and on 23 January 2014 for a third term.
