= Marino Busdachin =

Italian human rights activist (1956–2023)

Marino Busdachin (26 July 1956 – 2 June 2023) was an Italian politician and human rights activist.

== Early life and education ==
Busdachin was born in Umag (Istria, Croatia) in 1956, and moved to Italy with his family in 1961. He studied law at the University of Trieste.

== Political involvement ==
During the 1970s Busdachin campaigned for civil rights in Italy (right to conscientious objection, divorce and abortion). He was elected at an early age to the Federal Council of the Transnational Radical Party (1974– ?) and the City Council of Trieste (1978–82).

During the 1980s, he campaigned with the Transnational Radical Party to promote human, civil and political rights in Eastern Europe and the Soviet Union. He was arrested and jailed for his activities in Bulgaria (1982) and in the Soviet Union (1989).

Between 1993 and 1998, he worked in the United States on international campaigns for the establishment of ad hoc international tribunals to prosecute war crimes in the Former Yugoslavia and Rwanda. He also lobbied for a moratorium on the death penalty at the United Nations, where he represented the Transnational Radical Party.

Busdachin was one of the leading figures of the Nonviolent Radical Party (former Transnational Radical Party) and a member of its general council.

== No Peace Without Justice ==
Busdachin was a founder and General Secretary of Non c’e’ Pace Senza Giustizia - No Peace Without Justice (1994-1999), an NGO based in Italy, Belgium and the United States which campaigned for the establishment of an International Criminal Court.

== Unrepresented Nations and Peoples Organization ==
On 1 July 2003, Busdachin was appointed Secretary General of the Unrepresented Nations and Peoples Organization (UNPO), an international NGO based in The Hague, Netherlands, whose works focus on promoting the rights of minorities.

== Death ==
Busdachin died in Trieste on 7 June 2023, at the age of 66.

== Sources ==
- Biography of Marino Busdachin on the website of the Nonviolent Radical Party ()
- Speech at the United Nations calling for the establishment of an International Criminal Court ()
- Intervention of Marino Busdachin at the 38th Congress of the Radical Party in Geneva ()
- Interviews of Marino Busdachin on Radio Radicale ()

== See also ==
- Nonviolent Radical Party
- Unrepresented Nations and Peoples Organization
- No Peace Without Justice
