= Jakob Kellenberger =

Swiss diplomat

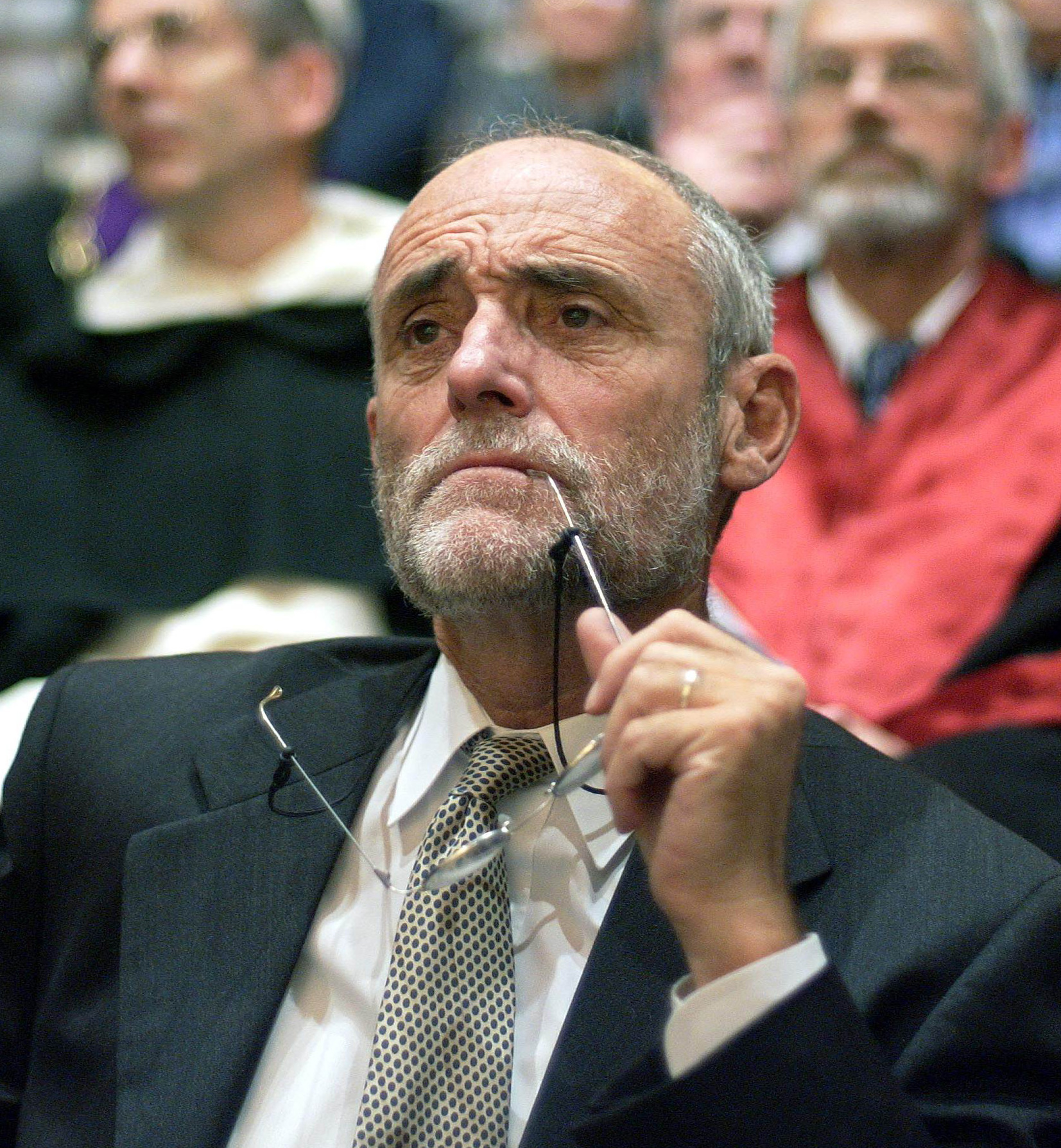
Jakob Kellenberger in 2003

Jakob Kellenberger (born 19 October 1944 in Heiden, Switzerland) is a former Swiss diplomat and former president of the International Committee of the Red Cross (ICRC). Since 2013 he has been the president of swisspeace.

== Biography ==
Jakob Kellenberger was born in the Swiss canton of Appenzell in 1944.

Kellenberger studied French and Spanish literature at the University of Zurich. He also studied at the Graduate Institute of International Studies in Geneva between 1974 and 1975. During his studies, he spent time in Tours, France, and Grenada, Spain. He wrote his undergraduate dissertation on Jean-Jacques Rousseau and his doctoral thesis on the Spanish playwright Pedro Calderón de la Barca. He completed his studies with a doctorate in literature from the University of Zurich.

While still a student, Kellenberger married Elisabeth Jossi. They have two daughters.

In 2013, Kellenberger was appointed as President of the swisspeace Foundation Board which establishes and oversees the annual and longer-term strategic work program for swisspeace and accepts the annual financial statements and budget. It also formulates and develops the guiding principles for swisspeace's work.

== Diplomatic service ==
Jakob Kellenberger entered the Swiss diplomatic service in 1974. He was posted to Madrid, then to Brussels and subsequently to London. From 1984 to 1992, he headed the joint office of the Swiss Ministries of Foreign Affairs and Economic Affairs in charge of the relations to the European Union and EFTA, and in 1988, he was promoted from the diplomatic rank of minister to ambassador. From 1989 to 1991, he headed the transport (transit) negotiations with the European Community on the Swiss side. In 1992, Kellenberger was appointed Secretary of State for Foreign Affairs. From 1992 to 1999, he held the posts of Secretary of State and head of the Directorate of Political Affairs within the Swiss Federal Department of Foreign Affairs. From 1994 to 1998, he was also coordinator and chief negotiator for Switzerland's sector-by-sector bilateral negotiations with the European Union.

== Presidency of the International Committee of the Red Cross (ICRC) ==
On 1 January 2000, Jakob Kellenberger was appointed president of the ICRC, a humanitarian organization that, as of July 2011, has some 13,000 staff and a network of over 200 delegations. The scope of the ICRC's operations expanded considerably during his term in office.

The ICRC's large-scale operations in Afghanistan, Iraq, Sudan and the Near East had and partly still have a particular impact on Jakob Kellenberger's job, as also reflected by his field visits and efforts in the sphere of humanitarian diplomacy. Kellenberger made a decisive contribution towards more intensive cooperation in several spheres between the ICRC and the European Union and its member States. Managing the ICRC's relationship with the United States after the September 11 attacks in the areas of law and humanitarian diplomacy was one of his greatest challenges. In difficult conflict situations, he considered it important to get first-hand experience of the reality on the ground, as witnessed by his trips to southern Lebanon during the war of summer 2006 and to Gaza in January 2009, and his numerous visits to Afghanistan and Darfur.

He stated on 5 April 2007 that the United States had inadequate procedures to guarantee the human rights of foreign detainees at the Guantanamo Bay detention camp in Cuba. He demanded a "more robust" system to determine whether to release hundreds of men who probably will never face trial.

Jakob Kellenberger set great store by a clear strategy for the organization and the adoption of clear positions in a rapidly changing environment. He made a major contribution to achieving those goals.

Jakob Kellenberger lectures at the Swiss Federal Institute of Technology, the University of Salamanca, and the Graduate Institute of International and Development Studies. He also sits on the Board of the Centre for Humanitarian Dialogue (HD), a private diplomacy organization based in Switzerland. President or Swisspeace.

== Honorary titles ==
- Doctor honoris causa from the Law Faculty of Basel University (2003)
- "Genève reconnaissante" (Grateful Geneva) medal from the city of Geneva (2005)
- Dr honoris causa from the Political Sciences Faculty of the University of Catania (2006)
- American Red Cross Chairman's Award for International Humanitarian Leadership (2006)
- Honorary Adviser to the Zurich Federal Polytechnic Institute (2007)
- Citizen of honour of the municipality of Heiden (Switzerland) [2009]
- Honorary Member of the American Society of International Law (2012)
- Grosses Verdienstkreuz mit Stern des Verdienstordens der Bundesrepublik Deutschland (2012)
- European Diplomacy Award des Forums Aussenpolitik und Wirtschaft in Berlin (2012)
- Commandeur dans l'Ordre national de la Légion d'honneur (2013)
- Distinguished Fellow of the Graduate Institute Geneva (2013)

== Publications ==
- Jakob Kellenberger, Wo liegt die Schweiz? Gedanken zum Verhältnis CH-EU, Verlag NZZ, Zürich 2014
- Jakob Kellenberger, The role of the International Committee of the Red Cross, in: The Oxford Handbook of International Law in Armed Conflict, Oxford 2014, p. 20-34
- Jakob Kellenberger, Confronting Complexity through Law: The Case for Reason, Vision and Humanity, in: American University International Law Review, Volume 28, Number 2, Washington 2020, p. 355-371
- Jakob Kellenberger, Politicisation of humanitarian work? in: Humanitarian Response Index 2010, The problems of polarisation, DARA, Madrid 2010
- Jakob Kellenberger, Humanitäres Völkerrecht, Verlag Huber, Frauenfeld/Stuttgart/Wien 2010
- Jakob Kellenberger, Politicisation of humanitarian work? in: the Humanitarian Response Index 2010, DARA, Madrid 2010
- Jakob Kellenberger, The ICRC's response to internal displacement: Strengths, challenges and constraints, in: International Review of the Red Cross, September 2009, Volume 91, Number 875
- Verantwortung in einer solidarischen Weltgemeinschaft, Frank-Walter Steinmeier und Jakob Kellenberger im Gespräch, in: Mensch, wo bist Du? 32. Deutscher Evangelischer Kirchentag, Bremen 2009. Gutersleh Verlagshaus, Gutersleh 2009
- Gespräch mit Hans Magnus Enzensberger (Die Lügner des Gutes), in: Robert Dempfer Das Rote Kreuz. Von Helden im Rampenlicht und diskreten Helfern, Deutike, Wien 2009, S. 204-222
- Jakob Kellenberger, Diplomat und IKRK-President, im Gespräch mit Hansjörg Erny, Zytglogge Verlag, Bern 2006
- Jakob Kellenberger: International Humanitarian Law and Other Legal Regimes: Interplay in Situations of Violence. In: International Review of the Red Cross. 851/2003. ICRC, S. 645-653, ISSN 1560-7755
