= Thomas Mirow =

German politician

Thomas Mirow (born 6 January 1953) is a German politician of the Social Democratic Party who served as president of the European Bank for Reconstruction and Development from 2008 to 2012.

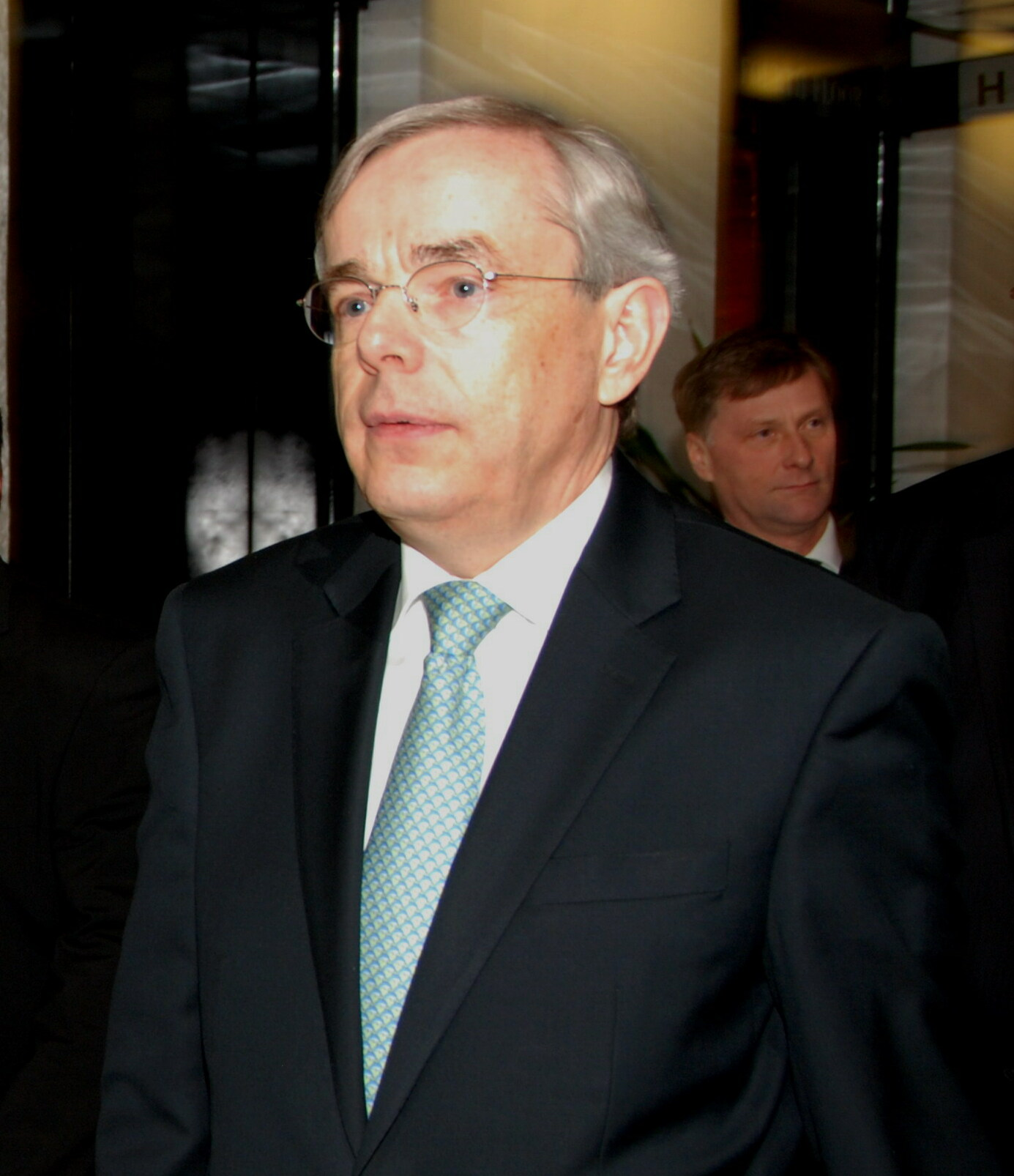

== Early life and education ==
Mirow was born and raised in Paris, where his father was Germany's representative at the Organisation for European Economic Co-operation (OEEC). He wrote his doctoral thesis on Charles De Gaulle’s foreign policy.

== Career ==
=== Career in state politics ===
From 1991 until 1997, Mirow held various positions in the state government of Mayor Henning Voscherau of Hamburg, including as State Minister and Head of the Chancellery (1991-1993) and as State Minister for Urban Development and Head of the Chancellery (1993-1997). He later served as State Minister for Economic Affairs in the government of Mayor Ortwin Runde from 1997 until 2001.

=== Career in the private sector ===
Between 2002 and 2005, Mirow worked as advisor to Ernst & Young and M. M. Warburg & Co. In 2004, he was a member of the European Commission’s High-level Group on the Mid-Term Review of the Lisbon Strategy, chaired by former Prime Minister of the Netherlands Wim Kok.

In the 2004 state elections, Mirow was the Social Democrats' candidate to unseat incumbent Mayor Ole von Beust.

=== State Secretary at the Federal Ministry of Finance, 2005-2008 ===
From 2005 until 2008, Mirow served as State Secretary at the Federal Ministry of Finance under Minister Peer Steinbrück in the first coalition government of Chancellor Angela Merkel.

=== President of the European Bank for Reconstruction and Development, 2008-2012 ===
At the 2008 annual meeting of the European Bank for Reconstruction and Development in Kyiv, Mirow was selected to replace Jean Lemierre; he had previously been nominated by a majority of EU Member States. He was the second German to head the EBRD.

During Mirow's tenure, the EBRD made efforts to tackle endemic corruption in the bank's area of operations. In 2011, it lifted the immunity of four Russian officials, including Yelena Kotova, Moscow's representative on the bank's board, to facilitate criminal probes by British police and the Russian authorities.

Also, Mirow focused the bank's activities on Russia, the Balkans and Central Asia.

By the end of his term in 2012, Mirow was formally proposed by Russia and Bulgaria for another four years in office. He campaigned for his re-appointment without Germany's backing in a five-candidate race after the European Union failed to agree a consensus candidate; he was eventually replaced by Suma Chakrabarti.

In 2012, Mirow joined the faculty of Hertie School of Governance as Senior Fellow.

== Other activities ==
=== International organizations ===
- European Bank for Reconstruction and Development (EBRD), Ex-Officio Alternate Member of the Board of Governors (2005-2008)
- World Bank, Ex-Officio Alternate Governor (2005-2008)

=== Corporate boards ===
- National Management Holding Baiterek, Member of the Board of Directors
- HSH Nordbank, Chairman of the Supervisory Board (2013-2018)
- RiverRock European Capital Partners, Member of the Senior Advisory Board (since 2013)
- Deutsche Telekom, Ex-Officio Member of the Supervisory Board (2006-2008)
- Hamburg Airport, Ex-Officio Chairman of the Supervisory Board (1997-2001)
- HHLA, Ex-Officio Chairman of the Supervisory Board (1997-2001)
- KfW, Ex-Officio Member of the Board of Supervisory Directors (1997-2001)

=== Non-profit organizations ===
- Deutsche Nationalstiftung, Chair of the Board
- ZEIT-Stiftung, Member of the Board of Trustees (since 2017)
- Übersee Club, Member of the Board of Trustees
