= Marisol Casado =

Spanish triathlete and sports administrator

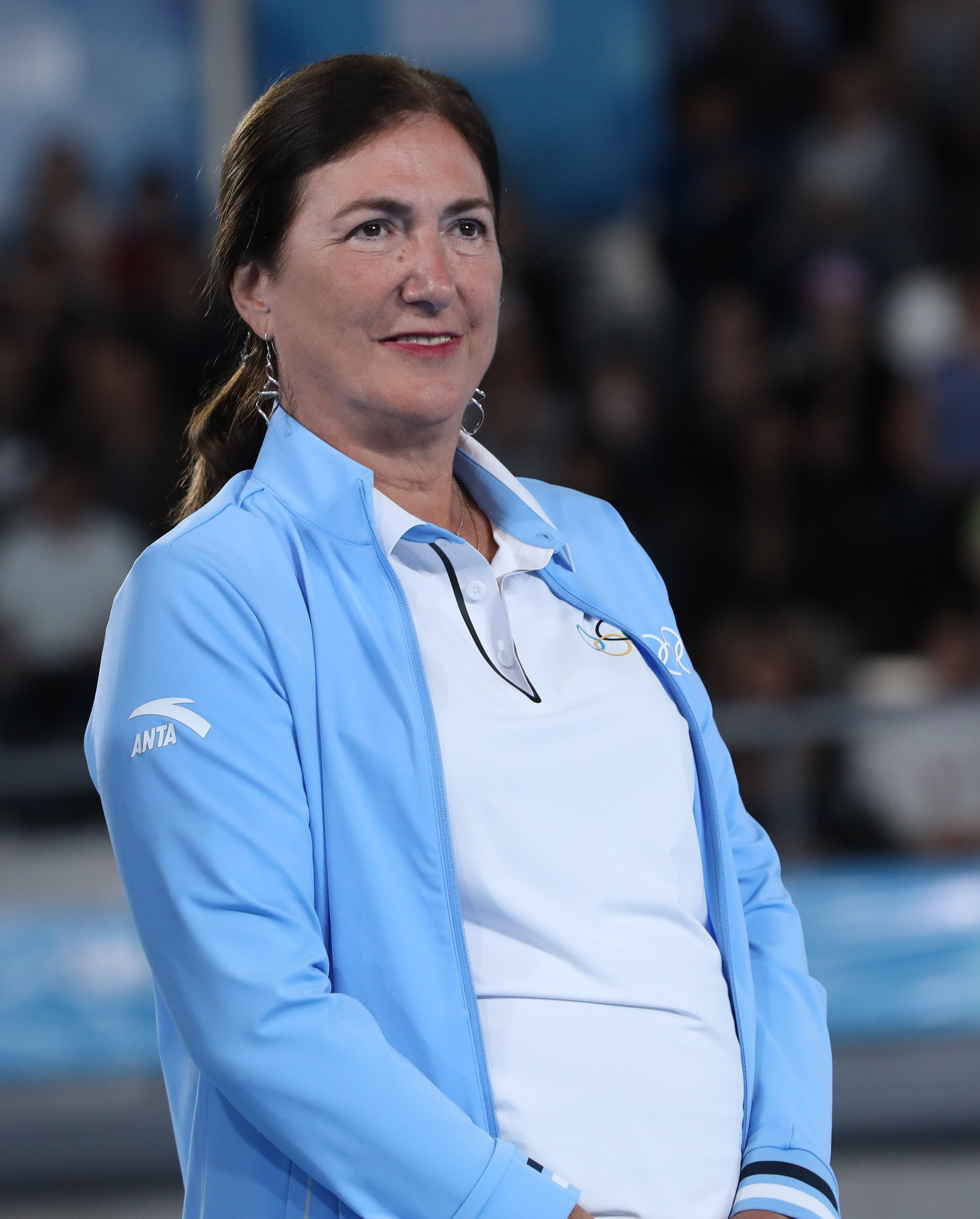
- Born: María de la Soledad Casado Estupiñán; 11 October 1956 (age 69); Madrid, Spain
- Citizenship: Spanish
- Education: BA '79 Spanish Philology, Autonomous University of Madrid ----- MBA '91 Sports Administration and Management, Complutense University of Madrid
- Occupation(s): ITU President since 2008; IOC Member since 2010
- Organizations: International Triathlon Union
- Predecessor: Les McDonald
- Board member of: The evaluation for the Games of XXXIII Olympiad in 2024 Commission ---- IOC Public Affairs and Social Development through Sport Commission
- Awards: Royal Order of Sports Merit

María de la Soledad Casado Estupiñán (born 11 October 1956) is a Spanish sports administrator and triathlete. She has been President of the International Triathlon Union since 2008, and as of 2017, she is the only female Spanish member of the International Olympic Committee. Marisol is the only woman to preside over an International Summer Sport Federation and one of (only) two in the entire Olympic program, the other being Kate Caithness of curling.

In 2004, she co-founded and assumed the presidency until 2009 of the Commission for Sport and Women of the Spanish Olympic Committee (SOC). In 1984, she was the winner of the first organized triathlon in Spain.

She was previously the Vice-President of the Spanish Triathlon Federation.

== Career ==
In 1979, she graduated in Hispanic Philology from the Autonomous University of Madrid. She worked as a teacher of Spanish as a foreign language from 1979 to 1989. In 1991, she obtained an MBA in Sports Administration and Management from the Complutense University of Madrid and the Spanish Olympic Committee.

=== Pioneering marathon ===
She played grass-hockey in university and started middle-distance running (400 and 800 meters) as well. She participated in the 1978 Madrid Marathon. Of the 5,000 participants, she was one of only 6 women. In 1984, she raced in the first triathlon held in Spain, in Guadalajara, and won.

=== Sports management ===
At the end of the eighties she was a member of the Spanish Triathlon Federation, where, from its inception - except for a brief absence between 1994 and 1997 - until 2008, she held the position of Secretary General.

From 2002 to 2008, she presided over the European Triathlon Union. In 2008, she was elected President of the International Triathlon Union, which was founded in Avignon, France in 1989. The International Triathlon Union was one of the first international sport federations that promoted equality between men and women, with the same prize money, distances, and media recognition for both sexes. Casado was re-elected in 2012 at the XXV Congress in Auckland (New Zealand), in which she defeated the South Korean Kyung-Sun Yu, by 82 votes to 33. In 2016 was re-elected for a third term. Upon assuming the presidency of the ITU, she became the second Spanish woman ever to preside over an International Federation of an Olympic sport. The first was Pilar de Borbón, of the International Equestrian Federation.

She has been a member of the Spanish Olympic Committee from 1992 to 1994 and from 2000 to the present. From 2004 to 2009, she was the co-founder and president of the SOC Women and Sport Commission.

In 2010, at the 122nd IOC session in Vancouver, she was elected as member of the International Olympic Committee, enduring as long as she is the President of the ITU. She has been a member of the jury of the Princess of Asturias of Sports Award in Spain.

== Equality in sport ==
Marisol has been a strong defender of gender parity and quotas. The International Triathlon Union has promoted gender equality, and governing body quotas (20% women minimum) since its inception under the guidance of Marisol Casado and previous ITU president, Les McDonald. Her main mandate of her four-year term was the inclusion of mixed triathlon relay (two women and two men) at the Tokyo 2020 Games, which has been achieved.

She defends the quotas in the National Triathlon Federations, and has advocated for an increase to 30%. "Very large steps have been taken in the last two years. All the federation codes of governance are being reviewed and in the IOC Agenda 2020 there is a specific section dedicated to gender equality. Almost all federations [have] positions for women. At the moment, through quotas, that is the fastest way [to achieve this]. In the hope that when they reach 30% [quotas] will be eliminated. I have defended them for many years and now they give me the reason. [In truth, woman only make up about 10% of the governing body board of directors], we are [likely] around 10%. Many interpretations can be made. When the IOC says that there are 33% women in commissions, it must be taken into account that someone like me is in four." - Marisol Casado, March 2016.

== International Olympic Committee Commissions ==
- Public Affairs and Social Development through Sport (2015-)
- Women in Sport (2015-)
- Evaluation for the Games of XXXIII Olympiad in 2024 (2016-)

== Awards and honours ==
- 2007 - Silver Medal of the Royal Order of Sporting Merit
