= Adham Sharara =

Canadian sports official (born 1953)

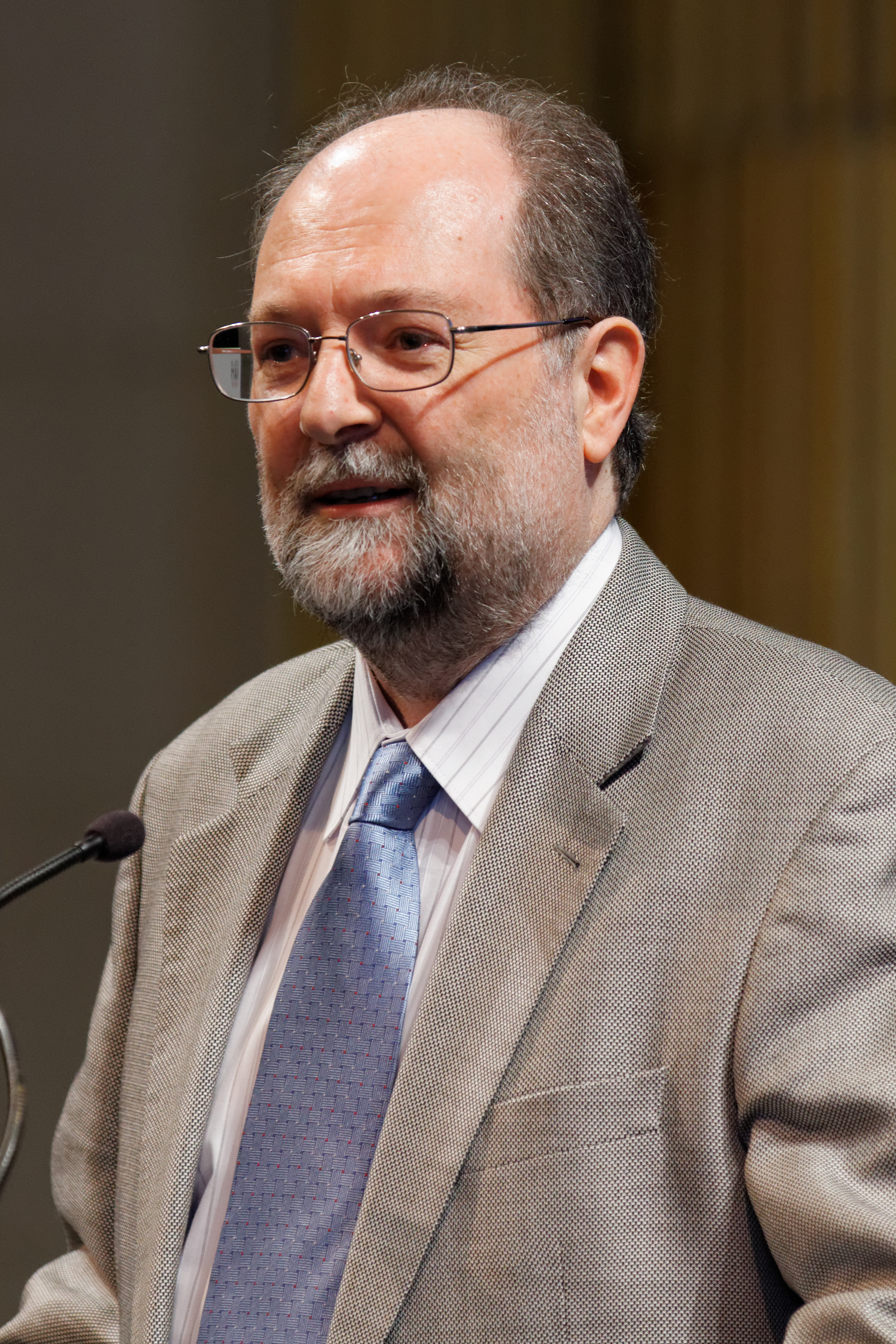
Sharara at the 2013 Mondial Ping

Adham Sharara (born 24 March 1953) is a Canadian sports official. Born in Cairo, he is the current Chairman and Honorary President of the International Table Tennis Federation, having succeeded Xu Yinsheng in 1999. He retired as ITTF President on 2014, and was succeeded by the Deputy President the German Thomas Weikert.

== President of the ITTF ==
Adham Sharara was President of the ITTF for 15 years, from 1999 to 2014.

In November 2007, Adham Sharara addressed the health risks related to using rubbers that are freshly glued to the blade for "a faster game" because of the associated harmful volatile compounds. In February 2008, he expressed his agreement with the proposal to limit citizenship-switching players, a measure that targeted specifically Chinese players accepting deals that include changing their nationality. In 2011, he moved the ITTF's headquarters from China to Singapore, to develop ties in this region and distance the federation from China's dominance in the sport, a topic he seriously addressed in his last years of tenure.

Sharara was elected to the newly created position of "Chairman of the ITTF" on 28 April 2014 at the ITTF Annual General Meeting (AGM) held in Tokyo, Japan.

In 2019 ITTF announced that found Mr Sharara had breached his fiduciary duties during his terms of office. Mr Adham Sharara was suspended from all activity within or in connection with the ITTF for four years. Mr Sharara appealed the decision at the Court of Arbitration in Sport (CAS) in Lausanne. The ITTF and Mr Sharara reached a settlement on 1 November 2020 and the suspension was cancelled. Mr Sharara remains Honorary President.
