= Habib Ben Yahia =

Tunisian politician

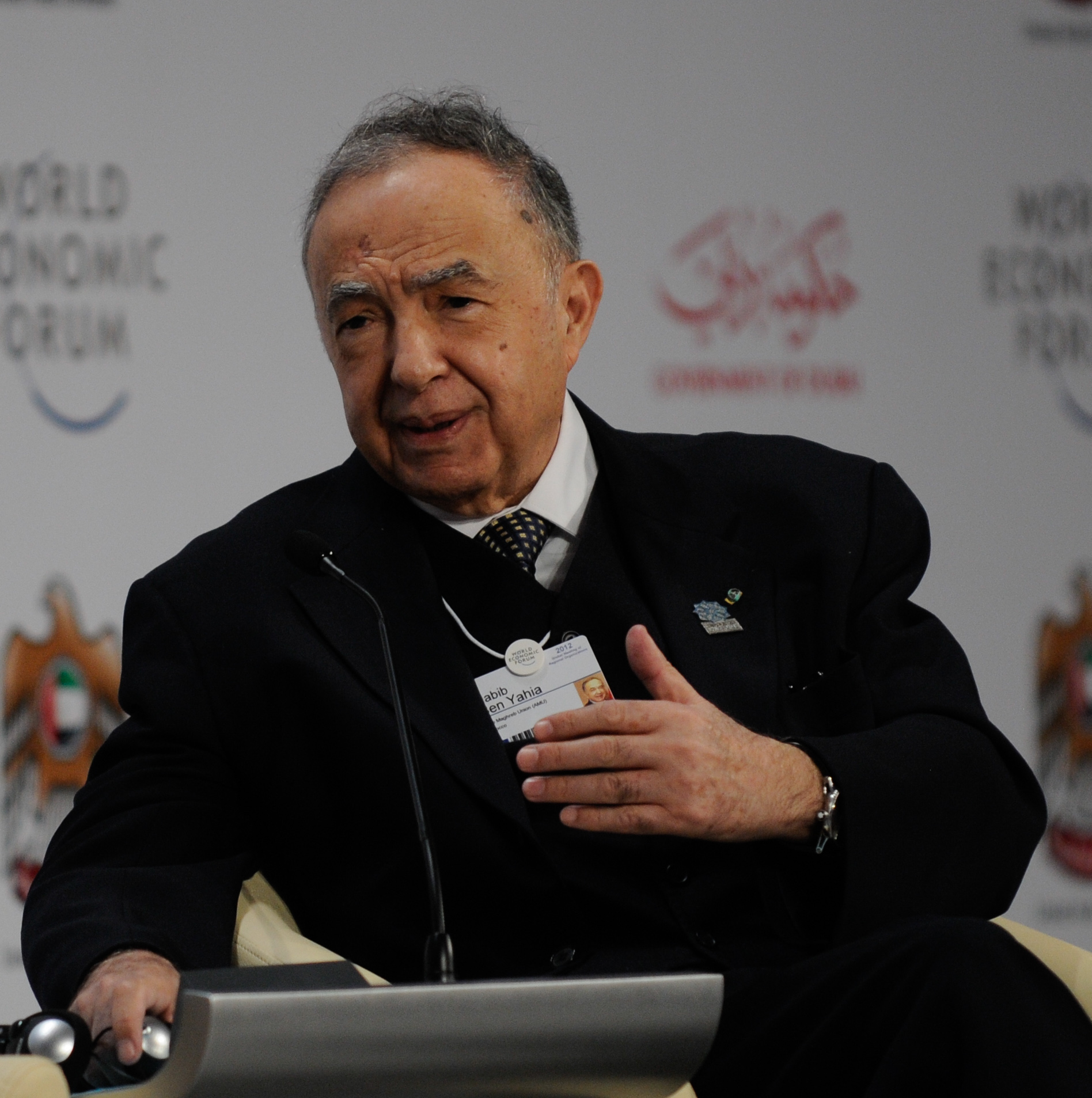
- Habib Ben Yahia at the World Economic Forum Summit on the Global Agenda in 2012
- Born: 30 July 1938 (age 88)
- Occupation: Politician

Habib Ben Yahia (born 30 July 1938 in Tunis) is a Tunisian politician.

== Career ==
From 1991 he served his first term as Minister of Foreign Affairs of Tunisia until January 1997 when he became defense minister. He served in that position until he became foreign minister for the second time in November 1999. He remained foreign minister until November 2004, when he left the government following a cabinet reshuffle. In January 2006 he was designated to be the secretary-general of the Arab Maghreb Union. He held this role until 2016.

== Imprisonment ==
Habib Ben Yahia was sentenced to five years in prison in March 2017 for power abuse.
