= Choue Chung-won =

President of the World Taekwondo Federation

Dr Choue Chung-won
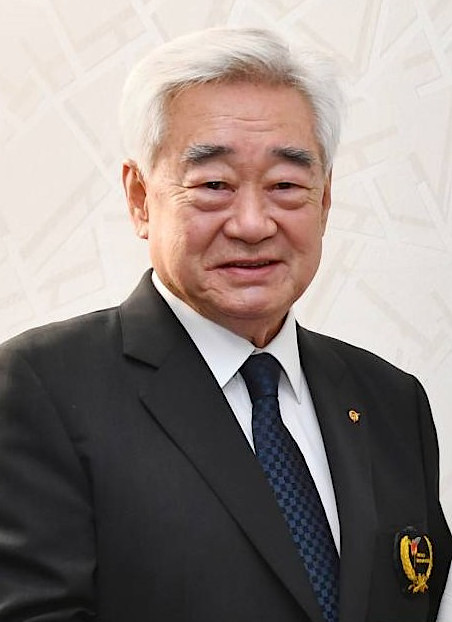

President of the World Taekwondo Federation
- Incumbent
- Assumed office 2004
- Preceded by: Un Yong Kim

Personal details
- Born: 20 December 1947 (age 78)
- Education: Kyung Hee University, Fairleigh Dickinson University, Katholieke Universiteit Leuven
- Occupation: Taekwondo Administrator

Korean name
- Hangul: 조정원
- Hanja: 趙正源
- RR: Jo Jeongwon
- MR: Cho Chŏngwŏn

Choue Chung-won (Korean: 조정원; born December 20, 1947) is a South Korean taekwondo practictioner. He has been President of the World Taekwondo Federation since 2004.

== Education ==
He graduated with a bachelor in Economics from the Kyung Hee University in 1970 and Masters from the Fairleigh Dickinson University for International Politics in 1974. In 1984, he obtained a PhD from the Katholieke Universiteit Leuven, Belgium.

== Career ==
Choue had been in World Taekwondo since 1999. He started the Taekwondo Humanitarian Foundation project and had hold various position one as the chairman Board if Trustee of the foundation, he participate and sustained personal investment of international sports and currently he is the Honorary President of the Taekwondo Peace Corps and the Korea Olympic Committee advisor. Choue was since in 2006 president of the GCS International, UN ECOSOC and as the chairman of the Korea Fair Play Committee.

On October 23, 2025 Dr. Choue was re-elected as the President of World Taekwondo for what will be his final term due to the age ceiling that will be in place when his new term expires.
