= Uğur Erdener =

Turkish physician (born 1950)

Prof. Dr. Uğur Erdener
- Born: June 15, 1950 (age 76); Trabzon, Turkey
- Education: Hacettepe University
- Occupation: Academic
- Board member of: International Olympic Committee, National Olympic Committee of Turkey

Uğur Erdener (born June 15, 1950) is a Turkish physician specialized in ophthalmology and professor at the Hacettepe University, Ankara. He is currently a member of the International Olympic Committee, former president of the National Olympic Committee of Turkey, and president of SportAccord.

== Early years ==
Uğur Erdener was born on June 15, 1950, in Trabzon. Upon completion of his elementary school education in Van, he attended the secondary school in Bandırma and graduated from the Gazi High School in Ankara. He enrolled in the School of Medicine of the Hacettepe University. After graduating with his medical degree in 1977, he completed a residency in Ophthalmology at Hacettepe University.

== Career ==
He served as the General Director of Hacettepe Hospitals between 2000 and 2007, and as the Rector of Hacettepe University between 2007 and 2011. He retired from Hacettepe University in 2017, due to the age limit. He has been the President of the World Archery Federation since 2005. As of 2011, he is the President of the Turkish National Olympic Committee. He is also the vice-president of the International Olympic Committee and the vice-president of the International Olympic Summer Sports Federation as of November 2017.

== Family life ==
Uğur Erdener was married to Macide Erdener, a former archer and archery judge. In his second marriage, he is with Zafer. He has three children and one grandchild.
