= Raymond Benjamin =

American attorney

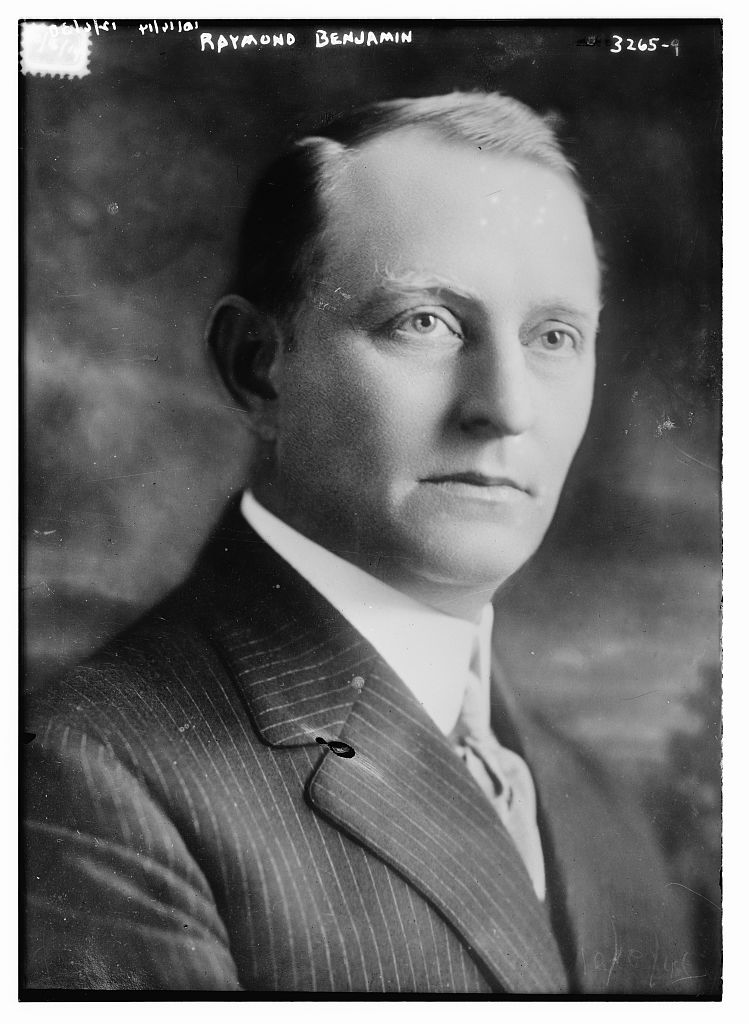
Raymond Benjamin, taken in the 1910s

Raymond Benjamin (December 14, 1872 – June 18, 1952) was an American attorney and chairman of the Republican National Committee in California.

== Biography ==
He was born on December 14, 1872, in Vallejo, California, to E.M. Benjamin, who was also an attorney. Benjamin was admitted to the California Bar Association in 1893. He started off his career in law by working for a local law firm in Vallejo.

In 1902, he married Mildred Frances, the daughter of G.M. Francis, the owner and publisher of the newspaper the Napa Register.

Benjamin served as Napa County's district attorney from 1901 until 1907, when he was promoted to the chief deputy to California Attorney General Ulysses S. Webb. He resigned in 1919 and returned to private practice. He participated in the U.S. Supreme Court trial Pullman Co. v. Richardson, 261 U.S. 330 (1923). Benjamin served in a number of significant positions on the Republican National Committee.

He died on June 18, 1952, in Westport, Connecticut.
