= List of international organization leaders in 2015 =

The following is a list of international organization leaders in 2015.

== UN organizations ==
Organization	Title	Leader	Country	In office	Ref
EDU – Intergovernmental Organization	Secretary-general	G. Irving Levance		2011–?	
Food and Agriculture Organization	Director-general	José Graziano da Silva	Brazil	2012–2019	
International Atomic Energy Agency	Director-general	Yukiya Amano	Japan	2009–2019	
International Civil Aviation Organization (ICAO)	President of the Council	Olumuyiwa Benard Aliu	Nigeria	2013–2019	
International Civil Aviation Organization (ICAO)	Secretary-general	Raymond Benjamin	France	2009–2015	
International Civil Aviation Organization (ICAO)	Secretary-general	Fang Liu	China	2015–2021	
International Labour Organization	Director-general	Guy Ryder	United Kingdom	2012–2022	
United Nations	Secretary-general	Ban Ki-moon	South Korea	2007–2016	
United Nations	President of the General Assembly	Sam Kutesa	Uganda	2014–2015	
United Nations	President of the General Assembly	Mogens Lykketoft	Denmark	2015–2016	
Security Council members	Member		China, France, Russia, United Kingdom, United States (permanent members); Chad, Chile, Jordan, Lithuania, Nigeria (elected for 2014–2015); Angola, Malaysia, New Zealand, Spain, Venezuela (elected for 2015–2016)		
United Nations Children's Fund (UNICEF)	Executive director	Anthony Lake	United States	2010–2017	
United Nations Educational, Scientific and Cultural Organization (UNESCO)	Director-general	Irina Bokova	Bulgaria	2009–2017	
United Nations High Commissioner for Human Rights	High Commissioner	Zeid Raad Al Hussein	Jordan	2014–2018	
United Nations High Commissioner for Refugees (UNHCR)	High Commissioner	António Guterres	Portugal	2005–2015	
United Nations Industrial Development Organization (UNIDO)	Director-general	Li Yong	China	2013–2021	
World Food Programme (WFP)	Executive director	Ertharin Cousin	United States	2012–2017	
World Health Organization (WHO)	Director-general	Margaret Chan	China	2006–2017	
World Meteorological Organization (WMO)	President	David Grimes	Canada	2011–2020	
World Meteorological Organization (WMO)	Secretary-general	Michel Jarraud	France	2004–2015	
World Tourism Organization (UNWTO)	Secretary-general	Taleb Rifai	Jordan	2010–2017	

== Political and economic organizations ==
Organization	Title	Leader	Country	In office	Ref
African, Caribbean and Pacific Group of States (ACP)	Secretary-general	Muhammad Mumuni	Ghana	2013–2015	
African, Caribbean and Pacific Group of States (ACP)	Secretary-general	Patrick Gomes	Guyana	2015–2020	
African Union	Chairperson	Mohamed Ould Abdel Aziz	Mauritania	2014–2015	
African Union	Chairperson	Robert Mugabe	Zimbabwe	2015–2016	
African Union	Chairperson of the Commission	Nkosazana Dlamini-Zuma	South Africa	2012–2017	
African Union	President of the Pan-African Parliament	Bethel Nnaemeka Amadi	Nigeria	2012–2015	
African Union	President of the Pan-African Parliament	Roger Nkodo Dang	Cameroon	2015–2021	
Andean Community	Secretary-general	Pablo Guzmán Laugier	Bolivia	2013–2016	
Arab League	Secretary-general	Nabil Elaraby	Egypt	2011–2016	
Arab Maghreb Union	Secretary-general	Habib Ben Yahia	Tunisia	2006–2016	
Asia-Pacific Economic Cooperation (APEC)	Executive director	Alan Bollard	New Zealand	2013–2018	
Association of Southeast Asian Nations (ASEAN)	Secretary-general	Lê Lương Minh	Vietnam	2013–2017	
Caribbean Community	Secretary-general	Irwin LaRocque	Dominica	2011–2021	
Central American Parliament	President	Armando Bardales	Honduras	2014–2015	
Central American Parliament	President	José Antonio Alvarado Correa	Nicaragua	2015–2016	
Common Market of East and Southern Africa (COMESA)	Secretary-general	Sindiso Ngwenya	Zimbabwe	2008–2018	
Commonwealth of Nations	Head	Queen Elizabeth II	United Kingdom	1952–present	
Commonwealth of Nations	Secretary-general	Kamalesh Sharma	India	2008–2016	
Commonwealth of Independent States	Executive secretary	Sergei Lebedev	Russia	2007–present	
Council of Europe	Secretary General	Thorbjørn Jagland	Norway	2009–2019	
Council of Europe	President of the Parliamentary Assembly of the Council of Europe (PACE)	Anne Brasseur	Luxembourg	2014–2016	
Council of Europe	President of the European Court of Human Rights	Dean Spielmann	Luxembourg	2012–2015	
Council of Europe	President of the European Court of Human Rights	Guido Raimondi	Italy	2015–2019	
East African Community	Secretary-general	Richard Sezibera	Rwanda	2011–2016	
Economic Community of West African States (ECOWAS)	President of the Commission	Kadré Désiré Ouédraogo	Burkina Faso	2012–2016	
Economic Community of West African States (ECOWAS)	Chairman	John Mahama	Ghana	2013–2015	
Economic Community of West African States (ECOWAS)	Chairman	Macky Sall	Senegal	2015–2016	
European Free Trade Association	Secretary-general	Kristinn F. Árnason	Iceland	2012–2018	
European Union (EU)	Presidency of the European Council	Donald Tusk	Poland	2014–2019	
European Union (EU)	Presidency of the Council of the European Union		Latvia	2015	
European Union (EU)	Presidency of the Council of the European Union		Luxembourg	2015	
European Union (EU)	President of the European Commission	Jean-Claude Juncker	Luxembourg	2014–2019	
European Union (EU)	President of the European Parliament	Martin Schulz	Germany	2012–2017	
European Union (EU)	Secretary-General of the Council and High Representative for the Common Foreign and Security Policy	Federica Mogherini	Italy	2014–2019	
European Union (EU)	President of the European Central Bank	Mario Draghi	Italy	2011–2019	
European Union (EU)	European Ombudsman	Emily O'Reilly	Ireland	2013–2025	
European Union (EU)	President of the Committee of the Regions (CoR)	Michel Lebrun	Belgium	2014–2015	
European Union (EU)	President of the Committee of the Regions (CoR)	Markku Markkula	Finland	2015–2017	
European Union (EU)	President of the European Investment Bank (EIB)	Werner Hoyer	Germany	2012–present	
European Union (EU)	President of the European Court of Justice (ECJ)	Vassilios Skouris	Greece	2003–2015	
European Union (EU)	President of the European Court of Justice (ECJ)	Koen Lenaerts	Belgium	2015–present	
European Union (EU)	President of the European Court of Auditors (ECA)	Vítor Manuel da Silva Caldeira	Portugal	2008–2017	
European Union (EU)	President of the European Economic and Social Committee (EESC)	Henri Malosse	France	2013–2015	
European Union (EU)	President of the European Economic and Social Committee (EESC)	Georges Dassis	France	2015–2018	
Group of Eight (G8)	President (informal)		Germany	2015	
Gulf Cooperation Council	Secretary-general	Abdullatif bin Rashid Al Zayani	Bahrain	2011–2020	
Ibero-American General Secretariat (SEGIB)	Secretary-general	Rebeca Grynspan	Costa Rica	2014–2021	
Indian Ocean Commission	Secretary-general	Jean Claude de l'Estrac	Mauritius	2012–2016	
Non-Aligned Movement (NAM)	Chairman	Hassan Rouhani	Iran	2013–2016	
Nordic Council	President	Höskuldur Þórhallsson	Iceland	2015	
Nordic Council	Secretary-general	Britt Bohlin	Sweden	2014–2021	
North Atlantic Treaty Organization (NATO)	Secretary-general	Jens Stoltenberg	Norway	2014–2024	
Organisation for Economic Co-operation and Development (OECD)	Secretary-general	José Ángel Gurría	Mexico	2006–2021	
Organization for Security and Co-operation in Europe (OSCE)	Secretary-general	Lamberto Zannier	Italy	2011–2017	
Organization for Security and Co-operation in Europe (OSCE)	Chairman-in-Office	Ivica Dačić	Serbia	2015	
Organization for Security and Co-operation in Europe (OSCE)	High Commissioner on National Minorities	Astrid Thors	Finland	2013–2016	
Organisation of Eastern Caribbean States	Director-general	Didacus Jules	Saint Lucia	2014–present	
Organisation of Islamic Cooperation (OIC)	Secretary-general	Iyad bin Amin Madani	Saudi Arabia	2014–2016	
Pacific Community (SPC)	Director-general	Colin Tukuitonga	Niue	2014–2020	
Pacific Islands Forum	Secretary-general	Meg Taylor	Papua New Guinea	2014–2021	
Shanghai Cooperation Organisation (SCO)	Secretary-general	Dmitry Mezentsev	Russia	2013–2015	
South Asian Association for Regional Cooperation (SAARC)	Secretary-general	Arjun Bahadur Thapa	Nepal	2014–2017	
Southern Cone Common Market (Mercosur)	Director of the Executive Secretariat	Oscar Pastore	Paraguay	2014–2016	
Southern African Development Community (SADC)	Executive secretary	Stergomena Tax	Tanzania	2013–2021	
Union of South American Nations (UNASUR)	President	José Mujica	Uruguay	2014–2015	
Union of South American Nations (UNASUR)	President	Tabaré Vázquez	Uruguay	2015–2016	
Union of South American Nations (UNASUR)	Secretary-general	Ernesto Samper	Colombia	2014–2017	
Unrepresented Nations and Peoples Organization (UNPO)	Secretary-general	Marino Busdachin	Italy	2003–2018	
World Trade Organization (WTO)	Director-general	Roberto Azevêdo	Brazil	2013–2020	

== Financial organizations ==
Organization	Title	Leader	Country	In office	Ref
African Development Bank	President	Donald Kaberuka	Rwanda	2005–2015	
African Development Bank	President	Akinwumi Adesina	Nigeria	2015–2025	
Asian Development Bank	President	Takehiko Nakao	Japan	2013–2020	
BRICS Development Bank	President	K. V. Kamath	India	2015–2020	
European Bank for Reconstruction and Development	President	Suma Chakrabarti	United Kingdom/India	2012–2020	
Inter-American Development Bank (IADB)	President	Luis Alberto Moreno	Colombia	2005–2020	
International Monetary Fund	Managing director	Christine Lagarde	France	2011–2019	
Islamic Development Bank (IDB)	President	Ahmed Mohammed Ali Al-Madani	Saudi Arabia	1975–present	
World Bank	President	Jim Yong Kim	United States	2012–2019	

== Sports organizations ==
Organization	President	Country	In office	Ref
Asian Football Confederation (AFC)	Salman bin Ibrahim Al Khalifa	Bahrain	2013–present	
Badminton World Federation (BWF)	Poul-Erik Høyer Larsen	Denmark	2013–present	
Confédération africaine de football (CAF)	Issa Hayatou	Cameroon	1988–2017	
Confederation of North, Central American and Caribbean Association Football (CONCACAF)	Jeffrey Webb	Cayman Islands	2012–2015	
Confederation of North, Central American and Caribbean Association Football (CONCACAF)	Alfredo Hawit	Honduras	2011–2012, 2015–2016	
Confederación Sudamericana de Fútbol (CONMEBOL)	Juan Ángel Napout	Paraguay	2014–2015	
Confederación Sudamericana de Fútbol (CONMEBOL)	Wilmar Valdez	Uruguay	2015–2016	
Fédération internationale de basket-ball (FIBA)	Horacio Muratore	Argentina	2014–2019	
Fédération Internationale des Échecs (FIDE)	Kirsan Ilyumzhinov	Russia	1995–2018	
Fédération Internationale de Football Association (FIFA)	Sepp Blatter	Switzerland	1998–2015	
Fédération Internationale de Football Association (FIFA)	Issa Hayatou	Cameroon	2015–2016 (acting)	
Fédération Internationale de Gymnastique (FIG)	Bruno Grandi	Italy	1996–2016	
Fédération internationale de natation (FINA)	Julio Maglione	Uruguay	2009–2021	
Fédération Internationale de Volleyball (FIVB)	Ary Graça	Brazil	2012–present	
Fédération Internationale des Sociétés d'Aviron (FISA)	Jean-Christophe Rolland	France	2014–present	
Fédération Équestre Internationale (FEI)	Ingmar De Vos	Belgium	2014–present	
Fédération Internationale d'Escrime (FIE)	Alisher Usmanov	Russia	2008–2022	
International Blind Sports Federation (IBSA)	Jannie Hammershøi	Denmark	2013–2021	
International Association of Athletics Federations	Lamine Diack	Senegal		
International Association of Athletics Federations	Sebastian Coe	United Kingdom	2015–present	
International Boxing Association (IBA)	Wu Ching-kuo	Taiwan	2006–2017	
International Canoe Federation (ICF)	Thomas Konietzko	Germany	2010–2016, 2021–present	
International Cricket Council (ICC)	Mustafa Kamal	Bangladesh	2014–2015	
International Cricket Council (ICC)	Zaheer Abbas	Pakistan	2015–2016	
International Golf Federation (IGF)	Peter Dawson	United Kingdom	2010–2020	
International Handball Federation (IHF)	Hassan Moustafa	Egypt	2000–present	
International Hockey Federation (FIIH)	René Fasel	Switzerland	1994–2021	
International Judo Federation (IJF)	Marius Viser	Romania/Austria	2007–present	
International Olympic Committee (IOC)	Thomas Bach	Germany	2013–2025	
International Paralympic Committee (IPC)	Philip Craven	United Kingdom	2001–2017	
International Shooting Sport Federation (ISSF)	Olegario Vàzquez Raña	Mexico	1980–2018	
International Table Tennis Federation (ITTF)	Thomas Weikert	Germany	2014–2021	
International Tennis Federation (ITF)	Francesco Ricci Bitti	Italy	1999–2015	
International Tennis Federation (ITF)	David Haggerty	United States	2015–present	
International Triathlon Union (ITU)	Marisol Casado	Spain	2008–present	
International Weightlifting Federation (IWF)	Tamás Aján	Hungary	2000–2020	
Oceania Football Confederation (OFC)	David Chung	Malaysia/Papua New Guinea	2010–2011, 2011–2018 (acting)	
Union Cycliste Internationale (UCI)	Brian Cookson	United Kingdom	2013–2017	
Union of European Football Associations (UEFA)	Michel Platini	France	2007–2015	
Union of European Football Associations (UEFA)	Ángel María Villar	Spain	2015–2016 (acting)	
Union Internationale de Pentathlon Moderne (UIPM)	Klaus Schormann	Germany	1992–present	
United World Wrestling (UWW)	Nenad Lalović	Serbia	2013–present	
World Archery Federation	Uğur Erdener	Turkey	2005–2025	
World Rugby (WR)	Bernard Lapasset	France	2008–2016	
International Sailing Federation (ISAF)	Carlo Croce	Italy	2012–2016	
World Taekwondo Federation (WTF)	Chungwon Choue	South Korea	2004–present	

== Other organizations ==
Organization	Title	Leader	Country	In office	Ref
Antarctic Treaty	Executive secretary	Manfred Reinke	Germany	2009–2017	
Colombo Plan	Secretary-general	Kinley Dorji	Bhutan	2014–2018	
Community of Portuguese Language Countries (CPLP)	Executive secretary	Murade Isaac Murargy	Mozambique	2012–2016	
Intergovernmental Authority on Development (IGAD)	Executive secretary	Mahboub Maalim	Kenya	2008–2019	
International Committee of the Red Cross	President	Peter Maurer	Switzerland	2012–2022	
International Court of Justice	President	Peter Tomka	Slovakia	2012–2015	
International Court of Justice	President	Ronny Abraham	Egypt	2015–2018	
International Criminal Court	President	Song Sang-Hyun	South Korea	2009–2015	
International Criminal Court	President	Silvia Fernández de Gurmendi	Argentina	2015–2018	
International Criminal Police Organization (Interpol)	Secretary-general	Jürgen Stock	Germany	2014–2024	
International Criminal Police Organization (Interpol)	President	Mireille Ballestrazzi	France	2012–2016	
International Federation of Red Cross and Red Crescent Societies	President	Tadateru Konoe	Japan	2009–2017	
International Maritime Organization (IMO)	Secretary-general	Koji Sekimizu	Japan	2012–2015	
International Organization for Migration (IOM)	Director-general	William Lacy Swing	United States	2008–2018	
International Telecommunication Union (ITU)	Secretary-general	Houlin Zhao	China	2015–2022	
Organisation for the Prohibition of Chemical Weapons (OPCW)	Director-general	Ahmet Üzümcü	Turkey	2010–2018	
Organization of the Petroleum Exporting Countries (OPEC)	Secretary-general	Abdallah Salem el-Badri	Libya	2007–2016	
Vanilla Islands Organisation	Chief Executive Officer	Pascal Viroleau	France	2014–present	
Universal Postal Union	Director-general	Bishar A. Hussein	Kenya	2013–2020	
World Intellectual Property Organization (WIPO)	Director-general	Francis Gurry	Australia	2008–2020	

== See also ==
- List of state leaders in 2015
- List of religious leaders in 2015
- List of international organization leaders in 2014
- List of international organization leaders in 2016
