= List of international organization leaders in 2017 =

The following is a list of international organization leaders in 2017.

== UN organizations ==
| Organization | Title | Leader | Country | In office | Ref |
|---|---|---|---|---|---|
| EDU – Intergovernmental Organization | Secretary-general | G. Irving Levance | | 2011–? | |
| Food and Agriculture Organization | Director-general | José Graziano da Silva | Brazil | 2012–2019 | |
| International Atomic Energy Agency | Director-general | Yukiya Amano | Japan | 2009–2019 | |
| International Civil Aviation Organization (ICAO) | President of the Council | Olumuyiwa Benard Aliu | Nigeria | 2013–2019 | |
| International Civil Aviation Organization (ICAO) | Secretary-general | Fang Liu | China | 2015–2021 | |
| International Labour Organization | Director-general | Guy Ryder | United Kingdom | 2012–2022 | |
| United Nations | Secretary-general | António Guterres | Portugal | 2017–present | |
| United Nations | President of the General Assembly | Peter Thomson | Fiji | 2016–2017 | |
| United Nations | President of the General Assembly | Miroslav Lajčák | Slovakia | 2017–2018 | |
| United Nations Security Council | Member | | China, France, Russia, United Kingdom, United States (permanent members); Egypt, Japan, Senegal, Ukraine, Uruguay (elected for 2016–2017); Bolivia, Ethiopia, Italy, Kazakhstan, Sweden (elected for 2017–2018) | | |
| United Nations Children's Fund (UNICEF) | Executive director | Anthony Lake | United States | 2010–2017 | |
| United Nations Educational, Scientific and Cultural Organization (UNESCO) | Director-general | Irina Bokova | Bulgaria | 2009–2017 | |
| United Nations Educational, Scientific and Cultural Organization (UNESCO) | Director-general | Audrey Azoulay | France | 2017–2025 | |
| United Nations High Commissioner for Human Rights | High Commissioner | Zeid Raad Al Hussein | Jordan | 2014–2018 | |
| United Nations High Commissioner for Refugees (UNHCR) | High Commissioner | Filippo Grandi | Italy | 2016–2025 | |
| United Nations Industrial Development Organization (UNIDO) | Director-general | Li Yong | China | 2013–2021 | |
| World Food Programme (WFP) | Executive director | Ertharin Cousin | United States | 2012–2017 | |
| World Food Programme (WFP) | Executive director | David Beasley | United States | 2017–present | |
| World Health Organization (WHO) | Director-general | Margaret Chan | China | 2006–2017 | |
| World Health Organization (WHO) | Director-general | Tedros Adhanom Ghebreyesus | Ethiopia | 2017–present | |
| World Meteorological Organization (WMO) | President | David Grimes | Canada | 2011–2020 | |
| World Meteorological Organization (WMO) | Secretary-general | Petteri Taalas | Finland | 2016–2023 | |
| World Tourism Organization (UNWTO) | Secretary-general | Taleb Rifai | Jordan | 2010–2017 | |

== Political and economic organizations ==
| Organization | Title | Leader | Country | In office | Ref |
|---|---|---|---|---|---|
| African, Caribbean and Pacific Group of States (ACP) | Secretary-general | Patrick Gomes | Guyana | 2015–2020 | |
| African Union | Chairperson | Idriss Déby | Chad | 2016–2017 | |
| African Union | Chairperson | Alpha Condé | Guinea | 2017–2018 | |
| African Union | Chairperson of the Commission | Nkosazana Dlamini-Zuma | South Africa | 2012–2017 | |
| African Union | Chairperson of the Commission | Moussa Faki | Chad | 2017–2025 | |
| African Union | President of the Pan-African Parliament | Roger Nkodo Dang | Cameroon | 2015–2021 | |
| Andean Community | Secretary-general | Walker San Miguel | Bolivia | 2016–2017 | |
| Arab League | Secretary-general | Ahmed Aboul Gheit | Egypt | 2016–present | |
| Arab Maghreb Union | Secretary-general | Taïeb Baccouche | Tunisia | 2016–2024 | |
| Asia-Pacific Economic Cooperation (APEC) | Executive director | Alan Bollard | New Zealand | 2013–2018 | |
| Association of Southeast Asian Nations (ASEAN) | Secretary-general | Lê Lương Minh | Vietnam | 2013–2017 | |
| Caribbean Community | Secretary-general | Irwin LaRocque | Dominica | 2011–2021 | |
| Central American Parliament | President | Priscilla Weeden de Miró | Panama | 2016–2017 | |
| Central American Parliament | President | Tony Raful Tejada | Dominican Republic | 2017–2018 | |
| Common Market of East and Southern Africa (COMESA) | Secretary-general | Sindiso Ngwenya | Zimbabwe | 2008–2018 | |
| Commonwealth of Nations | Head | Queen Elizabeth II | United Kingdom | 1952–2022 | |
| Commonwealth of Nations | Secretary-general | Patricia Scotland | United Kingdom | 2016–present | |
| Commonwealth of Independent States | Executive secretary | Sergei Lebedev | Russia | 2007–present | |
| Council of Europe | Secretary General | Thorbjørn Jagland | Norway | 2009–2019 | |
| Council of Europe | President of the Parliamentary Assembly of the Council of Europe (PACE) | Pedro Agramunt | Spain | 2016–2017 | |
| Council of Europe | President of the Parliamentary Assembly of the Council of Europe (PACE) | Stella Kyriakides | Cyprus | 2017–2018 | |
| Council of Europe | President of the European Court of Human Rights | Guido Raimondi | Italy | 2015–2019 | |
| East African Community | Secretary-general | Libérat Mfumukeko | Burundi | 2015–2021 | |
| East African Community | Chairman | John Magufuli | Tanzania | 2015–2017 | |
| East African Community | Chairman | Yoweri Museveni | Uganda | 2017–2019 | |
| Economic Community of West African States (ECOWAS) | President of the Commission | Marcel Alain de Souza | Benin | 2016–2018 | |
| Economic Community of West African States (ECOWAS) | Chairman | Ellen Johnson Sirleaf | Liberia | 2016–2017 | |
| Economic Community of West African States (ECOWAS) | Chairman | Faure Gnassingbé | Togo | 2017–2018 | |
| European Free Trade Association | Secretary-general | Kristinn F. Árnason | Iceland | 2012–2018 | |
| European Union (EU) | Presidency of the European Council | Donald Tusk | Poland | 2014–2019 | |
| European Union (EU) | Presidency of the Council of the European Union | | Malta | 2017 | |
| European Union (EU) | Presidency of the Council of the European Union | | Estonia | 2017 | |
| European Union (EU) | President of the European Commission | Jean-Claude Juncker | Luxembourg | 2014–2019 | |
| European Union (EU) | President of the European Parliament | Martin Schulz | Germany | 2012–2017 | |
| European Union (EU) | President of the European Parliament | Antonio Tajani | Italy | 2017–2019 | |
| European Union (EU) | Secretary-General of the Council and High Representative for the Common Foreign and Security Policy | Federica Mogherini | Italy | 2014–2019 | |
| European Union (EU) | President of the European Central Bank | Mario Draghi | Italy | 2011–2019 | |
| European Union (EU) | European Ombudsman | Emily O'Reilly | Ireland | 2013–2025 | |
| European Union (EU) | President of the Committee of the Regions (CoR) | Markku Markkula | Finland | 2015–2017 | |
| European Union (EU) | President of the Committee of the Regions (CoR) | Karl-Heinz Lambertz | Belgium | 2017–2020 | |
| European Union (EU) | President of the European Investment Bank (EIB) | Werner Hoyer | Germany | 2012–2024 | |
| European Union (EU) | President of the European Court of Justice (ECJ) | Koen Lenaerts | Belgium | 2015–present | |
| European Union (EU) | President of the European Court of Auditors (ECA) | Klaus-Heiner Lehne | Germany | 2016–2022 | |
| European Union (EU) | President of the European Economic and Social Committee (EESC) | Georges Dassis | Greece | 2015–2018 | |
| Group of Seven (G7) (Russia suspended from G8 in 2014) | President (informal) | | Italy | 2017 | |
| Gulf Cooperation Council | Secretary-general | Abdullatif bin Rashid Al Zayani | Bahrain | 2011–2020 | |
| Ibero-American General Secretariat (SEGIB) | Secretary-general | Rebeca Grynspan | Costa Rica | 2014–2021 | |
| Indian Ocean Commission | Secretary-general | Hamada Madi | Comoros | 2016–2020 | |
| Eurasian Economic Union | Chairman | | Kyrgyzstan | 2017 | |
| Non-Aligned Movement (NAM) | Chairman | Nicolás Maduro | Venezuela | 2016–2019 | |
| Nordic Council | President | Britt Lundberg | Finland | 2017 | |
| Nordic Council | Secretary-general | Britt Bohlin | Sweden | 2014–2021 | |
| North Atlantic Treaty Organization (NATO) | Secretary-general | Jens Stoltenberg | Norway | 2014–2024 | |
| Organisation for Economic Co-operation and Development (OECD) | Secretary-general | José Ángel Gurría | Mexico | 2006–2021 | |
| Organization for Security and Co-operation in Europe (OSCE) | Secretary-general | Lamberto Zannier | Italy | 2011–2017 | |
| Organization for Security and Co-operation in Europe (OSCE) | Secretary-general | Thomas Greminger | Switzerland | 2017–2020 | |
| Organization for Security and Co-operation in Europe (OSCE) | Chairman-in-Office | Frank-Walter Steinmeier | Serbia | 2016 | |
| Organization for Security and Co-operation in Europe (OSCE) | Chairman-in-Office | Sebastian Kurz | Austria | 2017 | |
| Organization for Security and Co-operation in Europe (OSCE) | Chairman-in-Office | Karin Kneissl | Austria | 2017 | |
| Organization for Security and Co-operation in Europe (OSCE) | High Commissioner on National Minorities | Lamberto Zannier | Italy | 2017–2020 | |
| Organisation of Eastern Caribbean States | Director-general | Didacus Jules | Saint Lucia | 2014–present | |
| Organisation of Islamic Cooperation (OIC) | Secretary-general | Yousef Al-Othaimeen | Saudi Arabia | 2016–2020 | |
| Pacific Community (SPC) | Director-general | Colin Tukuitonga | Niue | 2014–2020 | |
| Pacific Islands Forum | Secretary-general | Meg Taylor | Papua New Guinea | 2014–2021 | |
| Shanghai Cooperation Organisation (SCO) | Secretary-general | Rashid Alimov | Tajikistan | 2016–2018 | |
| South Asian Association for Regional Cooperation (SAARC) | Secretary-general | Arjun Bahadur Thapa | Nepal | 2014–2017 | |
| South Asian Association for Regional Cooperation (SAARC) | Secretary-general | Amjad Hussain B. Sial | Pakistan | 2017–2020 | |
| Southern Cone Common Market (Mercosur) | Director of the Executive Secretariat | Linda Rabbaglietti Love | Uruguay | 2017–2018 | |
| Southern African Development Community (SADC) | Executive secretary | Stergomena Tax | Tanzania | 2013–2021 | |
| Union of South American Nations (UNASUR) | President | Nicolás Maduro | Venezuela | 2016–2017 | |
| Union of South American Nations (UNASUR) | President | Mauricio Macri | Argentina | 2017–2018 | |
| Union of South American Nations (UNASUR) | Secretary-general | Ernesto Samper | Colombia | 2014–2017 | |
| Union of South American Nations (UNASUR) | Position vacant | | | 2017–present | |
| Unrepresented Nations and Peoples Organization (UNPO) | Secretary-general | Marino Busdachin | Italy | 2003–2018 | |
| World Trade Organization (WTO) | Director-general | Roberto Azevêdo | Brazil | 2013–2020 | |

== Financial organizations ==
| Organization | Title | Leader | Country | In office | Ref |
|---|---|---|---|---|---|
| African Development Bank | President | Akinwumi Adesina | Nigeria | 2015–2025 | |
| Asian Development Bank | President | Takehiko Nakao | Japan | 2013–2020 | |
| BRICS Development Bank | President | K. V. Kamath | India | 2015–2020 | |
| European Bank for Reconstruction and Development | President | Suma Chakrabarti | United Kingdom/India | 2012–2020 | |
| Inter-American Development Bank (IADB) | President | Luis Alberto Moreno | Colombia | 2005–2020 | |
| International Monetary Fund | Managing director | Christine Lagarde | France | 2011–2019 | |
| Islamic Development Bank (IDB) | President | Ahmed Mohammed Ali Al-Madani | Saudi Arabia | 1975–2021 | |
| World Bank | President | Jim Yong Kim | United States | 2012–2019 | |

== Sports organizations ==
| Organization | President | Country | In office | Ref |
|---|---|---|---|---|
| Asian Football Confederation (AFC) | Salman bin Ibrahim Al Khalifa | Bahrain | 2013–present | |
| Badminton World Federation (BWF) | Poul-Erik Høyer Larsen | Denmark | 2013–2025 | |
| Confédération africaine de football (CAF) | Issa Hayatou | Cameroon | 1988–2017 | |
| Confédération africaine de football (CAF) | Ahmad Ahmad | Madagascar | 2017–2020 | |
| Confederation of North, Central American and Caribbean Association Football (CONCACAF) | Victor Montagliani | Canada | 2016–present | |
| Confederación Sudamericana de Fútbol (CONMEBOL) | Alejandro Domínguez | Paraguay | 2016–present | |
| Fédération internationale de basket-ball (FIBA) | Horacio Muratore | Argentina | 2014–2019 | |
| Fédération Internationale des Échecs (FIDE) | Kirsan Ilyumzhinov | Russia | 1995–2018 | |
| Fédération Internationale de Football Association (FIFA) | Gianni Infantino | Switzerland | 2016–present | |
| Fédération internationale de natation (FINA) | Julio Maglione | Uruguay | 2009–2021 | |
| Fédération Internationale de Volleyball (FIVB) | Ary Graça | Brazil | 2012–2024 | |
| Fédération Internationale des Sociétés d'Aviron (FISA) | Jean-Christophe Rolland | France | 2014–present | |
| Fédération Équestre Internationale (FEI) | Ingmar De Vos | Belgium | 2014–present | |
| Fédération Internationale d'Escrime (FIE) | Alisher Usmanov | Russia | 2008–2022 | |
| International Blind Sports Federation (IBSA) | Jannie Hammershøi | Denmark | 2013–2021 | |
| International Association of Athletics Federations | Sebastian Coe | United Kingdom | 2015–present | |
| International Boxing Association (IBA) | Gafur Rakhimov | Uzbekistan | 2017–2019 | |
| International Canoe Federation (ICF) | Jose Perurena | Spain | 2016–2021 | |
| International Golf Federation (IGF) | Peter Dawson | United Kingdom | 2010–2020 | |
| International Handball Federation (IHF) | Hassan Moustafa | Egypt | 2000–present | |
| International Hockey Federation (FIIH) | René Fasel | Switzerland | 1994–2021 | |
| International Judo Federation (IJF) | Marius Viser | Romania/Austria | 2007–present | |
| International Olympic Committee (IOC) | Thomas Bach | Germany | 2013–2025 | |
| International Paralympic Committee (IPC) | Philip Craven | United Kingdom | 2001–2017 | |
| International Paralympic Committee (IPC) | Andrew Parsons | Brazil | 2017–present | |
| International Shooting Sport Federation (ISSF) | Olegario Vàzquez Raña | Mexico | 1980–2018 | |
| International Table Tennis Federation (ITTF) | Thomas Weikert | Germany | 2014–2021 | |
| International Tennis Federation (ITF) | David Haggerty | United States | 2015–present | |
| International Triathlon Union (ITU) | Marisol Casado | Spain | 2008–present | |
| International Weightlifting Federation (IWF) | Tamás Aján | Hungary | 2000–2020 | |
| Oceania Football Confederation (OFC) | David Chung | Malaysia/Papua New Guinea | 2010–2011, 2011–2018 (acting) | |
| Union Cycliste Internationale (UCI) | Brian Cookson | United Kingdom | 2013–2017 | |
| Union Cycliste Internationale (UCI) | David Lappartient | France | 2017–present | |
| Union of European Football Associations (UEFA) | Aleksander Čeferin | Slovenia | 2016–present | |
| Union Internationale de Pentathlon Moderne (UIPM) | Klaus Schormann | Germany | 1992–present | |
| United World Wrestling (UWW) | Nenad Lalović | Serbia | 2013–present | |
| World Archery Federation | Uğur Erdener | Turkey | 2005–2025 | |
| World Gymnastics (WG) | Morinari Watanabe | Japan | 2017–present | |
| World Rugby (WR) | Bill Beaumont | United Kingdom | 2016–present | |
| International Sailing Federation (ISAF) | Kim Andersen | Denmark | 2016–2020 | |
| World Taekwondo Federation (WTF) | Chungwon Choue | South Korea | 2004–present | |

== Other organizations ==
| Organization | Title | Leader | Country | In office | Ref |
|---|---|---|---|---|---|
| Antarctic Treaty | Executive secretary | Manfred Reinke | Germany | 2009–2017 | |
| Antarctic Treaty | Executive secretary | Albert Lluberas | Uruguay | 2017–present | |
| Colombo Plan | Secretary-general | Kinley Dorji | Bhutan | 2014–2018 | |
| Community of Portuguese Language Countries (CPLP) | Executive secretary | Murade Isaac Murargy | Mozambique | 2012–2016 | |
| Community of Portuguese Language Countries (CPLP) | Executive secretary | Maria do Carmo Silveira | São Tomé and Príncipe | 2017–2018 | |
| Intergovernmental Authority on Development (IGAD) | Executive secretary | Mahboub Maalim | Kenya | 2008–2019 | |
| International Committee of the Red Cross | President | Peter Maurer | Switzerland | 2012–2022 | |
| International Court of Justice | President | Ronny Abraham | Egypt | 2015–2018 | |
| International Criminal Court | President | Silvia Fernández de Gurmendi | Argentina | 2015–2018 | |
| International Criminal Police Organization (Interpol) | Secretary-general | Jürgen Stock | Germany | 2014–2024 | |
| International Criminal Police Organization (Interpol) | President | Meng Hongwei | China | 2016–2018 | |
| International Federation of Red Cross and Red Crescent Societies (IFRC) | President | Tadateru Konoe | Japan | 2009–2017 | |
| International Federation of Red Cross and Red Crescent Societies (IFRC) | President | Francesco Rocca | Italy | 2017–present | |
| International Maritime Organization (IMO) | Secretary-general | Kitack Lim | South Korea | 2016–present | |
| International Organization for Migration (IOM) | Director-general | William Lacy Swing | United States | 2008–2018 | |
| International Telecommunication Union (ITU) | Secretary-general | Houlin Zhao | China | 2015–present | |
| Organisation for the Prohibition of Chemical Weapons (OPCW) | Director-general | Ahmet Üzümcü | Turkey | 2010–2018 | |
| Organization of the Petroleum Exporting Countries (OPEC) | Secretary-general | Mohammed Barkindo | Nigeria | 2016–2022 | |
| Universal Postal Union | Director-general | Bishar A. Hussein | Kenya | 2013–2020 | |
| World Intellectual Property Organization (WIPO) | Director-general | Francis Gurry | Australia | 2008–2020 | |

== See also ==
- List of state leaders in 2017
- List of religious leaders in 2017
- List of international organization leaders in 2016
- List of international organization leaders in 2018
