= List of international organization leaders in 2013 =

The following is a list of international organization leaders in 2013.

== UN organizations ==
Organization	Title	Leader	Country	In office	Ref
Food and Agriculture Organization	Director-general	José Graziano da Silva	Brazil	2012–2019	
International Atomic Energy Agency	Director-general	Yukiya Amano	Japan	2009–2019	
International Civil Aviation Organization	President of the Council	Roberto Kobeh González	Mexico	2006–2013	
International Civil Aviation Organization	President of the Council	Olumuyiwa Benard Aliu	Nigeria	2013–2019	
International Civil Aviation Organization	Secretary-general	Raymond Benjamin	France	2009–2015	
International Labour Organization	Director-general	Guy Ryder	United Kingdom	2012–2022	
United Nations	Secretary-general	Ban Ki-moon	South Korea	2007–2016	
United Nations	President of the General Assembly	Vuk Jeremić	Serbia	2012–2013	
United Nations	President of the General Assembly	John William Ashe	Antigua and Barbuda	2013–2014	
Security Council members	Member		China, France, Russia, United Kingdom, United States (permanent members); Azerbaijan, Guatemala, Morocco, Pakistan, Togo (elected for 2012–2013); Argentina, Australia, Republic of Korea, Luxembourg, Rwanda (elected for 2013–2014)		
United Nations Children's Fund (UNICEF)	Executive director	Anthony Lake	United States	2010–2017	
United Nations Educational, Scientific and Cultural Organization (UNESCO)	Director-general	Irina Bokova	Bulgaria	2009–2017	
United Nations High Commissioner for Human Rights	High Commissioner	Navanethem Pillay	South Africa	2008–2014	
United Nations High Commissioner for Refugees (UNHCR)	High Commissioner	António Guterres	Portugal	2005–2015	
United Nations Industrial Development Organization (UNIDO)	Director-general	Kandeh Yumkella	Sierra Leone	2005–2013	
United Nations Industrial Development Organization (UNIDO)	Director-general	Li Yong	China	2013–2021	
World Food Programme (WFP)	Executive director	Ertharin Cousin	United States	2012–2017	
World Health Organization (WHO)	Director-general	Margaret Chan	China	2006–2017	
World Meteorological Organization (WMO)	President	David Grimes	Canada	2011–2020	
World Meteorological Organization (WMO)	Secretary-general	Michel Jarraud	France	2004–2015	
World Tourism Organization (UNWTO)	Secretary-general	Taleb Rifai	Jordan	2010–2017	

== Political and economic organizations ==
Organization	Title	Leader	Country	In office	Ref
African, Caribbean and Pacific Group of States (ACP)	Secretary-general	Mohamed Ibn Chambas	Ghana	2010–2013	
African, Caribbean and Pacific Group of States (ACP)	Secretary-general	Alhaji Muhammad Mumuni	Ghana	2013–2015	
African Union	Chairperson	Thomas Boni Yayi	Benin	2012–2013	
African Union	Chairperson	Hailemariam Desalegn	Ethiopia	2013–2014	
African Union	Chairperson of the Commission	Nkosazana Dlamini-Zuma	South Africa	2012–2017	
African Union	President of the Pan-African Parliament	Bethel Nnaemeka Amadi	Nigeria	2012–2015	
Andean Community	Secretary-general	Adalid Contreras Baspineiro	Bolivia	2010–2011 (interim), 2011–2013	
Andean Community	Secretary-general	Pablo Guzmán Laugier	Bolivia	2013–2016	
Arab League	Secretary-general	Nabil Elaraby	Egypt	2011–2016	
Arab Maghreb Union	Secretary-general	Habib Ben Yahia	Tunisia	2006–2016	
Asia-Pacific Economic Cooperation (APEC)	Executive director	Alan Bollard	New Zealand	2013–2018	
Association of Southeast Asian Nations (ASEAN)	Secretary-general	Lê Lương Minh	Vietnam	2013–2017	
Caribbean Community	Secretary-general	Irwin LaRocque	Dominica	2011–2021	
Central American Parliament	President	Leonel Búcaro	El Salvador	2012–2013	
Central American Parliament	President	Paula Rodríguez	Guatemala	2013–2014	
Common Market of East and Southern Africa (COMESA)	Secretary-general	Sindiso Ngwenya	Zimbabwe	2008–2018	
Commonwealth of Nations	Head	Queen Elizabeth II	United Kingdom	1952–present	
Commonwealth of Nations	Secretary-general	Kamalesh Sharma	India	2008–2016	
Commonwealth of Independent States	Executive secretary	Sergei Lebedev	Russia	2007–present	
Council of Europe	Secretary General	Thorbjørn Jagland	Norway	2009–2019	
Council of Europe	President of the Parliamentary Assembly of the Council of Europe (PACE)	Jean-Claude Mignon	France	2012–2014	
Council of Europe	President of the European Court of Human Rights	Dean Spielmann	Luxembourg	2012–2015	
East African Community	Secretary-general	Richard Sezibera	Rwanda	2011–2016	
Economic Community of West African States	President of the Commission	Kadré Désiré Ouédraogo	Burkina Faso	2012–2016	
Economic Community of West African States	Chairman	Alassane Ouattara	Ivory Coast	2012–2013	
Eurasian Economic Community	Secretary-general	Tair Mansurov	Kazakhstan	2007–2014	
Eurasian Economic Community	Chairman of the Interstate Council	Nursultan Nazarbayev	Kazakhstan	2001–2014	
European Free Trade Association	Secretary-general	Kristinn F. Árnason	Iceland	2012–2018	
European Union (EU)	Presidency of the European Council	Herman Van Rompuy	Belgium	2009–2014	
European Union (EU)	Presidency of the Council of the European Union		Ireland	2013	
European Union (EU)	Presidency of the Council of the European Union		Lithuania	2013	
European Union (EU)	President of the European Commission	José Manuel Barroso	Portugal	2004–2014	
European Union (EU)	President of the European Parliament	Martin Schulz	Germany	2012–2017	
European Union (EU)	Secretary-General of the Council and High Representative for the Common Foreign and Security Policy	Catherine Ashton	United Kingdom	2009–2014	
European Union (EU)	President of the European Central Bank	Mario Draghi	Italy	2011–2019	
European Union (EU)	European Ombudsman	Nikiforos Diamandouros	Greece	2003–2013	
European Union (EU)	European Ombudsman	Emily O'Reilly	Ireland	2013–present	
European Union (EU)	President of the Committee of the Regions (CoR)	Ramón Luis Valcárcel	Spain	2012–2014	
European Union (EU)	President of the European Investment Bank (EIB)	Werner Hoyer	Germany	2012–present	
European Union (EU)	President of the European Court of Justice (ECJ)	Vassilios Skouris	Greece	2003–2015	
European Union (EU)	President of the European Court of Auditors (ECA)	Vítor Manuel da Silva Caldeira	Portugal	2008–2017	
European Union (EU)	President of the European Economic and Social Committee (EESC)	Staffan Nilsson	Sweden	2010–2013	
European Union (EU)	President of the European Economic and Social Committee (EESC)	Henri Malosse	France	2013–2015	
Group of Eight (G8)	President (informal)		United Kingdom	2013	
Gulf Cooperation Council	Secretary-general	Abdullatif bin Rashid Al Zayani	Bahrain	2011–2020	
Ibero-American General Secretariat (SEGIB)	Secretary-general	Enrique V. Iglesias	Uruguay	2005–2013	
Ibero-American General Secretariat (SEGIB)	Secretary-general	Rebeca Grynspan	Costa Rica	2014–2021	
Indian Ocean Commission	Secretary-general	Jean Claude de l'Estrac	Mauritius	2012–2016	
Non-Aligned Movement (NAM)	Chairman	Mahmoud Ahmadinejad	Iran	2012–2013	
Non-Aligned Movement (NAM)	Chairman	Hassan Rouhani	Iran	2013–2016	
Nordic Council	President	Marit Nybakk	Finland	2013	
Nordic Council	Secretary-general	Jan-Erik Enestam	Finland	2007–2013	
North Atlantic Treaty Organization (NATO)	Secretary-general	Anders Fogh Rasmussen	Denmark	2009–2014	
Organisation for Economic Co-operation and Development (OECD)	Secretary-general	José Ángel Gurría	Mexico	2006–2021	
Organization for Security and Co-operation in Europe (OSCE)	Secretary-general	Lamberto Zannier	Italy	2011–2017	
Organization for Security and Co-operation in Europe (OSCE)	Chairman-in-Office	Leonid Kozhara	Ukraine	2013	
Organization for Security and Co-operation in Europe (OSCE)	High Commissioner on National Minorities	Knut Vollebæk	Norway	2007–2013	
Organization for Security and Co-operation in Europe (OSCE)	High Commissioner on National Minorities	Astrid Thors	Finland	2013–2016	
Organization of American States	Secretary-general	José Miguel Insulza	Chile	2005–2015	
Organisation of Eastern Caribbean States	Director-general	Len Ishmael	Saint Lucia	2003–2013	
Organisation of Islamic Cooperation (OIC)	Secretary-general	Ekmeleddin Ihsanoglu	Turkey	2005–2013	
Pacific Community (SPC)	Director-general	Jimmie Rodgers	Solomon Islands	2006–2014	
Pacific Islands Forum	Secretary-general	Tuiloma Neroni Slade	Samoa	2008–2014	
Shanghai Cooperation Organisation (SCO)	Secretary-general	Dmitry Mezentsev	Russia	2013–2015	
South Asian Association for Regional Cooperation (SAARC)	Secretary-general	Ahmed Saleem	Maldives	2012–2014	
Southern Cone Common Market (Mercosur)	Director of the Executive Secretariat	Jeferson Miola	Brazil	2012–2013	
Southern African Development Community (SADC)	Executive secretary	Tomaz Salomão	Mozambique	2005–2013	
Southern African Development Community (SADC)	Executive secretary	Stergomena Tax	Tanzania	2013–2021	
Union of South American Nations (USAN)	President	Ollanta Humanla	Peru	2012–2013	
Union of South American Nations (USAN)	President	Dési Bouterse	Suriname	2013–2014	
Union of South American Nations (USAN)	Secretary-general	Alí Rodríguez Araque	Venezuela	2012–2014	
Unrepresented Nations and Peoples Organization (UNPO)	Secretary-general	Marino Busdachin	Italy	2003–2018	
World Trade Organization (WTO)	Director-general	Pascal Lamy	France	2005–2013	
World Trade Organization (WTO)	Director-general	Roberto Azevêdo	Brazil	2013–2020	

== Financial organizations ==
Organization	Title	Leader	Country	In office	Ref
African Development Bank	President	Donald Kaberuka	Rwanda	2005–2015	
Asian Development Bank	President	Haruhiko Kuroda	Japan	2005–2013	
Asian Development Bank	President	Takehiko Nakao	Japan	2013–2020	
European Bank for Reconstruction and Development	President	Suma Chakrabarti	United Kingdom/India	2012–2020	
Inter-American Development Bank (IADB)	President	Luis Alberto Moreno	Colombia	2005–2020	
International Monetary Fund	Managing director	Christine Lagarde	France	2011–2019	
Islamic Development Bank (IDB)	President	Ahmed Mohammed Ali Al-Madani	Saudi Arabia	1975–present	
World Bank	President	Jim Yong Kim	United States	2012–2019	

== Sports organizations ==
Organization	President	Country	In office	Ref
Asian Football Confederation (AFC)	Zhang Jilong	China	2011–2013	
Asian Football Confederation (AFC)	Salman bin Ibrahim Al Khalifa	Bahrain	2013–present	
Badminton World Federation (BWF)	Kang Young-joong	South Korea	2005–2013	
Badminton World Federation (BWF)	Poul-Erik Høyer Larsen	Denmark	2013–present	
Confédération africaine de football (CAF)	Issa Hayatou	Cameroon	1988–2017	
Confederation of North, Central American and Caribbean Association Football (CONCACAF)	Jeffrey Webb	Cayman Islands	2012–2015	
Confederación Sudamericana de Fútbol (CONMEBOL)	Nicolás Leoz	Paraguay	1986–2013	
Confederación Sudamericana de Fútbol (CONMEBOL)	Eugenio Figueredo	Uruguay	2013–2014	
Fédération internationale de basket-ball	Yvan Mainini	France	2010–2014	
Fédération Internationale des Échecs (FIDE)	Kirsan Ilyumzhinov	Russia	1995–2018	
Fédération Internationale de Football Association (FIFA)	Sepp Blatter	Switzerland	1998–2015	
Fédération Internationale de Gymnastique (FIG)	Bruno Grandi	Italy	1996–2016	
Fédération internationale de natation (FINA)	Julio Maglione	Uruguay	2009–2021	
Fédération Internationale de Volleyball (FIVB)	Ary Graça	Brazil	2012–present	
Fédération Internationale des Sociétés d'Aviron (FISA)	Denis Oswald	Switzerland	1989–2014	
Fédération Équestre Internationale (FEI)	Princess Haya bint Hussein	Jordan	2006–2014	
Fédération Internationale d'Escrime (FIE)	Alisher Usmanov	Russia	2008–2022	
International Blind Sports Federation (IBSA)	Michael Barredo	Philippines	2005–2013	
International Blind Sports Federation (IBSA)	Jannie Hammershøi	Denmark	2013–2021	
International Association of Athletics Federations	Lamine Diack	Senegal	1999–2015	
International Boxing Association (IBA)	Wu Ching-kuo	Taiwan	2006–2017	
International Canoe Federation (ICF)	Thomas Konietzko	Germany	2010–2016, 2021–present	
International Cricket Council (ICC)	Alan Isaac	New Zealand	2012–2014	
International Golf Federation (IGF)	Peter Dawson	United Kingdom	2010–2020	
International Handball Federation (IHF)	Hassan Moustafa	Egypt	2000–present	
International Hockey Federation (FIIH)	René Fasel	Switzerland	1994–2021	
International Judo Federation (IJF)	Marius Viser	Romania/Austria	2007–present	
International Olympic Committee (IOC)	Jacques Rogge	Belgium	2001–2013	
International Olympic Committee (IOC)	Thomas Bach	Germany	2013–2025	
International Paralympic Committee (IPC)	Philip Craven	United Kingdom	2001–2017	
International Rugby Board (IRB)	Bernard Lapasset	France	2008–2016	
International Shooting Sport Federation (ISSF)	Olegario Vàzquez Raña	Mexico	1980–2018	
International Table Tennis Federation (ITTF)	Adham Sharara	Canada	1999–2014	
International Tennis Federation (ITF)	Francesco Ricci Bitti	Italy	1999–2015	
International Triathlon Union (ITU)	Marisol Casado	Spain	2008–present	
International Weightlifting Federation (IWF)	Tamás Aján	Hungary	2000–2020	
Oceania Football Confederation (OFC)	David Chung	Malaysia/Papua New Guinea	2010–2011, 2011–2018 (acting)	
Union Cycliste Internationale (UCI)	Pat McQuaid	Ireland	2005–2013	
Union Cycliste Internationale (UCI)	Brian Cookson	United Kingdom	2013–2017	
Union of European Football Associations (UEFA)	Michel Platini	France	2007–2015	
Union Internationale de Pentathlon Moderne (UIPM)	Klaus Schormann	Germany	1992–present	
United World Wrestling (UWW)	Raphaël Martinetti	Switzerland	2002–2013	
United World Wrestling (UWW)	Nenad Lalović	Serbia	2013–present	
World Archery Federation	Uğur Erdener	Turkey	2005–2025	
International Rugby Board	Bernard Lapasset	France	2008–2016	
International Sailing Federation (ISAF)	Carlo Croce	Italy	2012–2016	
World Taekwondo Federation (WTF)	Chungwon Choue	South Korea	2004–present	

== Other organizations ==
Organization	Title	Leader	Country	In office	Ref
Antarctic Treaty	Executive secretary	Manfred Reinke	Germany	2009–2017	
Colombo Plan	Secretary-general	Adam Maniku	Maldives	2011–2013	
Community of Portuguese Language Countries (CPLP)	Executive secretary	Murade Isaac Murargy	Mozambique	2012–2016	
International Committee of the Red Cross	President	Peter Maurer	Switzerland	2012–2022	
International Court of Justice	Presidents	Peter Tomka	Slovakia	2012–2015	
International Criminal Court	President	Song Sang-Hyun	South Korea	2009–2015	
International Criminal Police Organization (Interpol)	Secretary-general	Ronald Noble	United States	2000–2014	
International Criminal Police Organization (Interpol)	President	Mireille Ballestrazzi	France	2012–2016	
International Federation of Red Cross and Red Crescent Societies	President	Tadateru Konoe	Japan	2009–2017	
International Maritime Organization	Secretary-general	Koji Sekimizu	Japan	2012–2015	
International Organization for Migration (IOM)	Director-general	William Lacy Swing	United States	2008–2018	
International Telecommunication Union	Secretary-general	Hamadoun Touré	Mali	2007–2014	
Organisation for the Prohibition of Chemical Weapons (OPCW)	Director-general	Ahmet Üzümcü	Turkey	2010–2018	
Organization of the Petroleum Exporting Countries (OPEC)	Secretary-general	Abdallah Salem el-Badri	Libya	2007–2016	
Universal Postal Union	Director-general	Bishar A. Hussein	Kenya	2013–2016	
World Intellectual Property Organization (WIPO)	Director-general	Francis Gurry	Australia	2008–2020	

== See also ==
- List of state leaders in 2013
- List of religious leaders in 2013
- List of international organization leaders in 2012
- List of international organization leaders in 2014
