= Alan Isaac =

NZ businessman, cricket administrator & former player

Alan Isaac CNZM
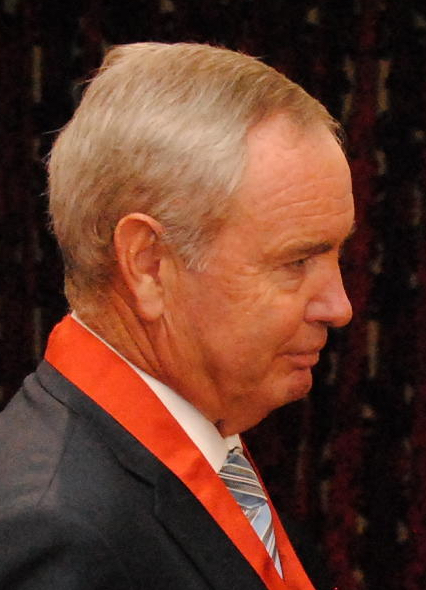
- Isaac in 2013

President of the International Cricket Council
- In office 2012–2014
- Preceded by: Sharad Pawar
- Succeeded by: Mustafa Kamal

Chairman of the New Zealand Cricket Board
- In office 2008–2009
- Preceded by: John Anderson
- Succeeded by: Chris Moller

Personal details
- Born: Alan Raymond Isaac; 20 February 1952 (age 74) Wellington, New Zealand

Alan Raymond Isaac CNZM (born 20 January 1952) is a New Zealand businessman, cricket administrator, and former player.

== Early life and education ==
Born in Wellington on 20 January 1952, Isaac was educated at Onslow College and Victoria University of Wellington. He graduated with a Bachelor of Commerce and Administration from Victoria in 1974.

== Cricket ==
A left-handed batsman, Isaac represented Wellington at the age-group level and captained the Wellington second team for three years. However, it has been as a cricket administrator that he has gained prominence. He became president of New Zealand Cricket in 2008, and succeeded Sharad Pawar, former president of the Board of Control for Cricket in India, as president of the International Cricket Council in 2012.

== Business career ==
Isaac had a 35-year career with KPMG in New Zealand, with roles including managing partner, chairman, and chief executive officer. He holds directorships with a range of companies, including Skellerup Holdings, Opus International Consultants, and Oceania Healthcare, and is a trustee of the New Zealand Community Trust and the New Zealand Red Cross Foundation.

== Honours ==
In the 2013 New Year Honours, Isaac was appointed a Companion of the New Zealand Order of Merit for services to cricket and business.

In 2015, Isaac received a distinguished alumni award from Victoria University of Wellington.

Preceded by Sharad Pawar	President of the ICC; 2012–2014	Succeeded by Mustafa Kamal
