= Fang Liu =

Chinese attorney (born 1962)

Liu Fang
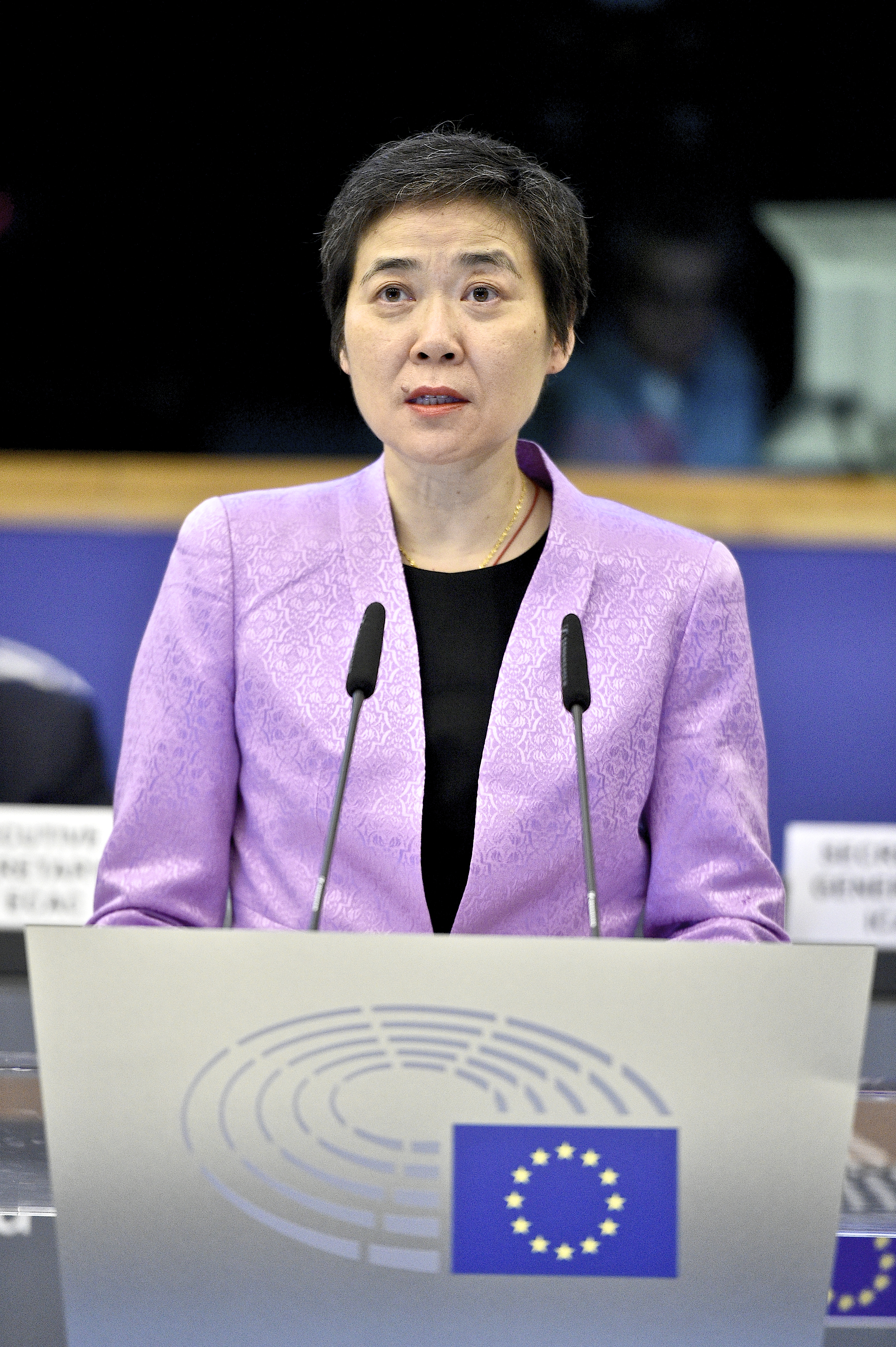
- Liu in 2018
- Born: February 1962 (age 64); China
- Education: PhD in international law; Master’s degree in air and space law
- Alma mater: Wuhan University; Leiden University
- Employer: ICAO
- Known for: Secretary General of ICAO

Liu Fang (Chinese: 柳芳; pinyin: Liǔ Fāng; born February 1962) is a Chinese attorney who was the twelfth Secretary General of the International Civil Aviation Organization (ICAO), a position she has held from 2015 until 2021 when Juan Carlos Salazar was appointed the new Secretary General. She was the first woman to hold this position.

Prior to joining ICAO, Liu served the General Administration of Civil Aviation of China (CAAC), where over the course of twenty years she eventually became responsible for China's international air transport policy and regulations, bilateral and multilateral relations with international and regional organizations including ICAO, the World Trade Organization, the Asia-Pacific Economic Cooperation (APEC), the European Union, and the Association of Southeast Asian Nations (ASEAN).

During her career with the CAAC, Liu was elected chair of the Aviation Group of the Asia-Pacific Economic Cooperation (APEC) and was nominated by China to sit on the Air Transport Regulation Panel in ICAO. She also served as an expert on mediation and dispute resolution. She was chief negotiator for the Chinese government for bilateral and multilateral air transport agreements with foreign countries.

== Criticism ==
In 2016, despite Taiwan being a recognized international air traffic hub, Taiwan was not permitted to attend the September 27th ICAO meeting.

In the midst of the COVID-19 pandemic, the ICAO came under fire for denying Taiwan access to participation in crisis coordination efforts and subsequently attempting to silence such criticism on Twitter.
