= Markku Markkula =

Finnish politician

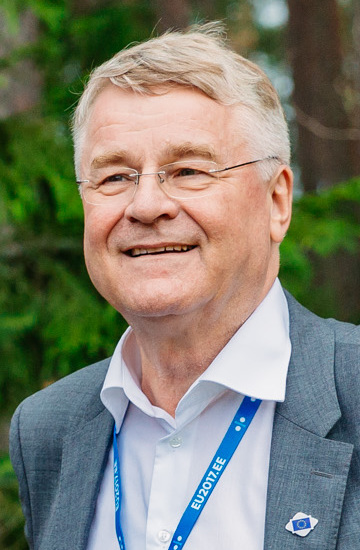
Markku Markkula, 2017

Markku Antero Markkula (born July 15, 1950, in Kolari, Finland) is a Finnish politician and the First Vice-president of the European Committee of the Regions. A member of Finland's Espoo City Council since 1980 - where he was president from 1990 to 1992 and again in 2010 - Markkula is a member of the Board of the Helsinki-Uusimaa Regional Council and has been Chairman of the Espoo City Planning Board since 2004.

== Education ==
Markku Markkula graduated as a Master of Science in Technology in Industrial Business and Management in 1979 from the Helsinki University of Technology (later Aalto University of Technology). Previously he had been elected vice-chair of the student board in 1974 and chair in 1975. He has also served on the Finnish Society as the chairman of the Board of the Academic Engineers and Architects in Finland TEK (1993–2005).

== Career ==
Early political life 1975 - 1995

Markku Markkula is a member of the National Coalition Party in Finland having held political Chairmanships on different organisational levels throughout his career. He was elected vice-chair of the National Coalition Party's Student Union in 1975 and chair in 1976. Markkula has chaired the Espoo Regional Organisation in 1984-1988 and the Uusimaa District in 1990–1994. He was a member of the Board of the Party between 1976–1977 and 1989–1995.

Career in politics 1995 - 2003

A long-standing politician, Mr Markkula is a former member of the Finnish Parliament (1995–2003). During his time as a Finnish MP he served as a member of two permanent parliamentary committees: the Committee for Science, Education and Culture, and the Committee for the Future. During his term as an MP his international work included holding the Presidency of European Parliamentary Technology Assessment (EPTA) Council.

He has been the member of several EU High Level Expert Groups, such as the EU Smart Specialisation Mirror Group and Chairman of the Continuing Education Working Group of European Society for Engineering Education (SEFI). He is one of the Ambassadors of the Leonardo European Corporate Learning Award.

Career in Education

Mr Markkula currently works at Aalto University as the Advisor to Aalto Presidents where his focus is on European Union research, innovation and education policy affairs. In 1984 Markkula became the first full-time director of the Continuing Education Centre of the Helsinki University of Technology (1984–1991). He has also worked as the Director of the Lifelong Learning Institute Dipoli (1991–1995, 2003–2008) and was part-time Secretary General of the International Association for Continuing Engineering Education from 1989 to 2001.

Other appointments

In Finland his roles have included memberships in the boards of several companies and other organisations, among them Tekes, the Finnish Funding Agency for Innovation and Technology. He has chaired the Board of the Finnish Information Society Development Centre (TIEKE). He has also acted as chairman of the Board of Laurea University of Applied Sciences, and Chairman of the Society for Organisational Learning (SOL-Finland).

Career in European Politics

He has been a member of the European Committee of the Regions (CoR) since 2010 and has held a number of positions in the institution over the last five years including the 1st vice-chair of the EPP Group and Chair of EPP Group's Task Force on Europe 2020.

In February 2015 he was elected President of the CoR for a two-and- a-half year mandate. He is currently the First Vice-president of the CoR.

== Publications ==
Over his career Markkula has published extensively and has published several books including:

- Passion to Learn, Benchmarking Good Lifelong Learning Practice with Riitta Suurla (1998)
- Methods and Tools for Effective Dissemination, with Riitta Suurla (1999)
- Developing and Implementing Knowledge Management in the Parliament of Finland with Riitta Suurla and Olli Mustajärvi (2002)
- The Knowledge Triangle – Re-inventing the Future with Pia Lappalainen (2013).
- COP22: es hora de acelerar la acción por el clima. Por (*) Markku Markkula (Español)

His latest book, published in 2015 and co-edited by Pia Lappalainen and Hank Kune, is called Orchestrating Regional Innovation Ecosystems.

== Personal life ==
Markku Markkula has been married since 1972. He has three children with his wife, one son and two daughters. Markkula is a lieutenant in the Finnish reserve forces.
