= Henri Malosse =

French politician and businessman

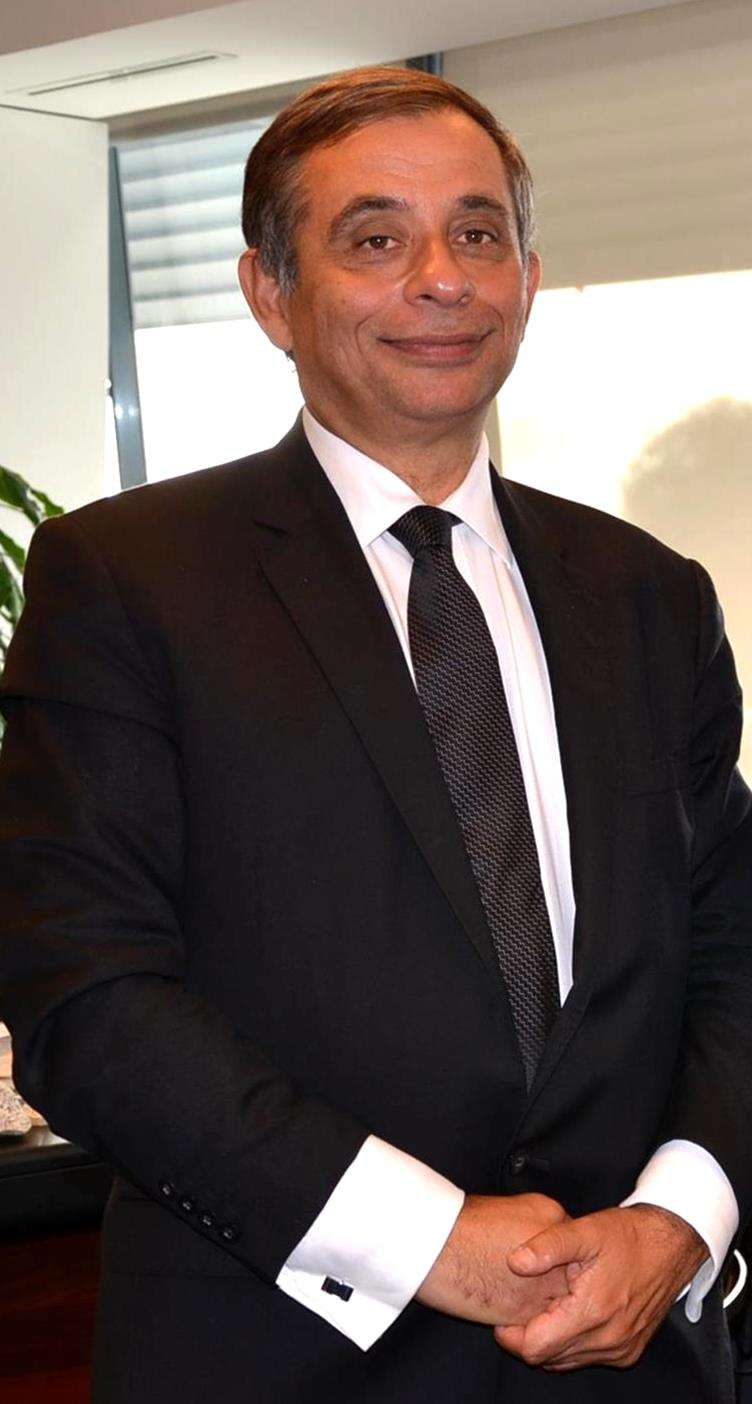

President of the European Economic and Social Committee
- In office April 2013 – October 2015

Personal details
- Born: 6 October 1954 (age 72) Montpellier, France

Henri Malosse (born 6 October 1954) is a French politician and businessman who was president of the European Economic and Social Committee from 2013 to 2015.

== Biography ==
Henri Malosse video presentation

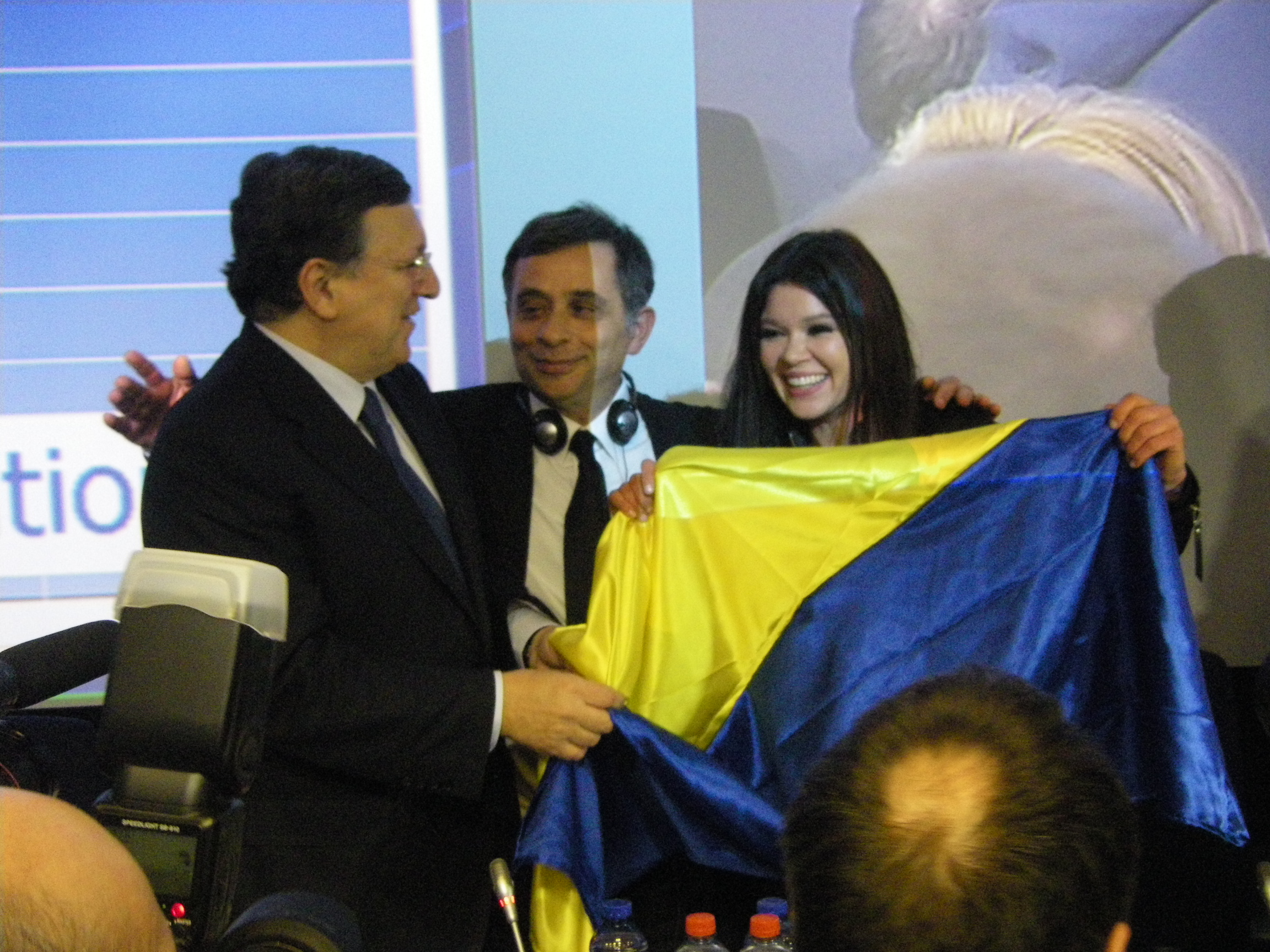
Malosse with Ruslana and European Commission president José Manuel Barroso in January 2014

Henri Malosse was born in Montpellier in a family of professors from Corsica. He graduated from the Sciences Po in 1976.

He began exploring the cultures of Germany and Eastern Europe and speaks Polish, Russian, English and German.

Malosse supported the Solidarity trade union. In 1976, he met Lech Wałęsa in Gdańsk. He was banned from entering the country by the communist government of Wojciech Jaruzelski for a period of eight years. He was harassed by the secret police of the Polish People's Republic. His file can be found in the archive of IPN in Warsaw.

He was involved in European policies for small and medium enterprises, inspiring the creation of the Euro Info Centres. He worked to create the Delegation of the Assembly of French Chambers of Commerce and Industry to the European Union, and assumed its Direction six years later. He also participated in the European Association of Small and Medium Enterprises at the European Parliament.

In 1995 he was appointed by the French government to the European Economic and Social Committee, the 5th institution of the European Union, writing more than 50 reports including a critic of the posted workers directive. He was the chair of the pre-accession EU-Bulgaria Consultative Committee, and of the Employer's Group from 2016 to 2013. In 2013, he was elected the 30th president of the EESC.

His presidency was noted in European media as a result of his critical position on EU policies towards Greece during the Greek government-debt crisis. He signed a protocol of cooperation with Martin Schulz, the president of the European Parliament.

He was the first EU representative to participate in Euromaidan in Kyiv in December 2013 and to pay a visit to the 14th Dalai Lama in Dharamsala on 10 March 2014. His political engagement raised a lot of criticism from the Chinese Communist Party and their supporters in Europe. He was also put temporarily on a blacklist by the Russian federation.

On 15 October 2014, Henri Malosse received the National Order of the Legion of Honour by the former President of the French Republic, Valery Giscard d'Estaing, in Brussels.

== Publications ==
- (with Frederic Fappani von Lothringen) L'Europe c'est quoi pour toi ?, Ed. Harmattan, 2019 (ISBN 9782343161280)
- (with Laure Limousin) Building Europe: The History and Future of a Europe of the People /Construction européenne-Histoires et avenir d’une Europe des peuples/ ed L’harmattan, 2012, (ISBN 9782296961074)
- (with Bruno Vever) We must save the European citizen! - A "C plan" to a citizens' Europe /Il faut sauver le citoyen européen ! - Un "plan C" pour rendre l'Europe aux citoyens/, Editions Bruylant, 2010, (ISBN 9782802728146)
- (with Pascal Fontaine) Europe from A to Z /L'Europe de A à Z/, Editions Bruylant, 2006, (ISBN 2802723227)
- (with Bernard Huchet) Unifying the Greater Europe /Unifier la Grande Europe/, preface by Jean-Pierre Raffarin, postscript by Jacques Santer, Editions Bruylant, 2001, (ISBN 2802715291)
- Europe at your doorstep: a guide to EU funding mechanisms /L'Europe à votre porte : les instruments de financement et de cooperation/, Paris : Centre français du commerce extérieur, 1991, (ISBN 2279618095)
- (with Pascal Fontaine) The European Institutions /Les institutions européennes/, Retz, 1992, (ISBN 2725614961)
- (with Édith Cresson), Europe at your doorstep: practical manual on the actions of the EEC concerning economic operators /L'Europe à votre porte : manuel pratique sur les actions de la CEE intéressant les opérateurs économiques, Paris: Centre français du commerce extérieur, 1989, (ISBN 227964004X)
