= Guido Raimondi =

Italian judge (born 1953)

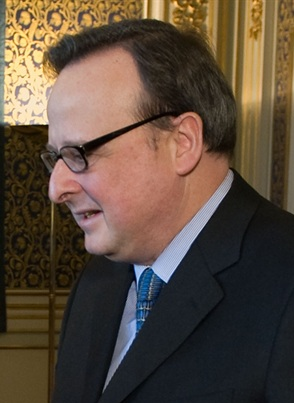

President of the European Court of Human Rights in respect of Italy
- In office 1 November 2015 – 5 May 2019
- Preceded by: Dean Spielmann
- Succeeded by: Linos-Alexandre Sicilianos

Judge of the European Court of Human Rights in respect of Italy
- In office 5 May 2010 – 5 May 2019

Personal details
- Born: 22 October 1953 (age 72) Naples, Italy

Guido Raimondi (born 22 October 1953) is an Italian judge born in Naples and former judge and President of the European Court of Human Rights (ECHR). Raimondi was nominated to the court by Italy and began his 9-year term as ECHR judge on 5 May 2010. He was the president of ECHR from 1 November 2015 until 4 May 2019.

== Education and early life ==
He studied law at the University of Naples from which he graduated in 1975. He then became an assistant lecturer at the university and was a judge from 1977 - 1986. Between 1986 and 1989 he was involved in the legal affairs of the Italian Foreign Ministry.

== Professional career ==
Between 1997 and 2003 Raimondi served on the Supreme Court of Cassation, first in the Advocate General's office and then as judge. During the same period he occasionally served as ad hoc judge in cases before the European Court of Human Rights. In May 2003 he joined the International Labour Organization (ILO) as Deputy Legal Adviser in Geneva. In February 2008 he became Legal Adviser of that organization.

== European Court of Human Rights ==
Raimondi was a judge at the European Court of Human Rights from 2010 until 2019. In September 2012 he was elected section president and then vice-president of the court for a three-year term of office starting on 1 November 2012.

In January 2016, in the wake of the European migrant crisis, Raimondi announced that the court had put in place an “action plan” to cope with a forecast surge in legal cases from migrants seeking to avoid being sent to other European countries.
