= Thomas Weikert =

German sports official

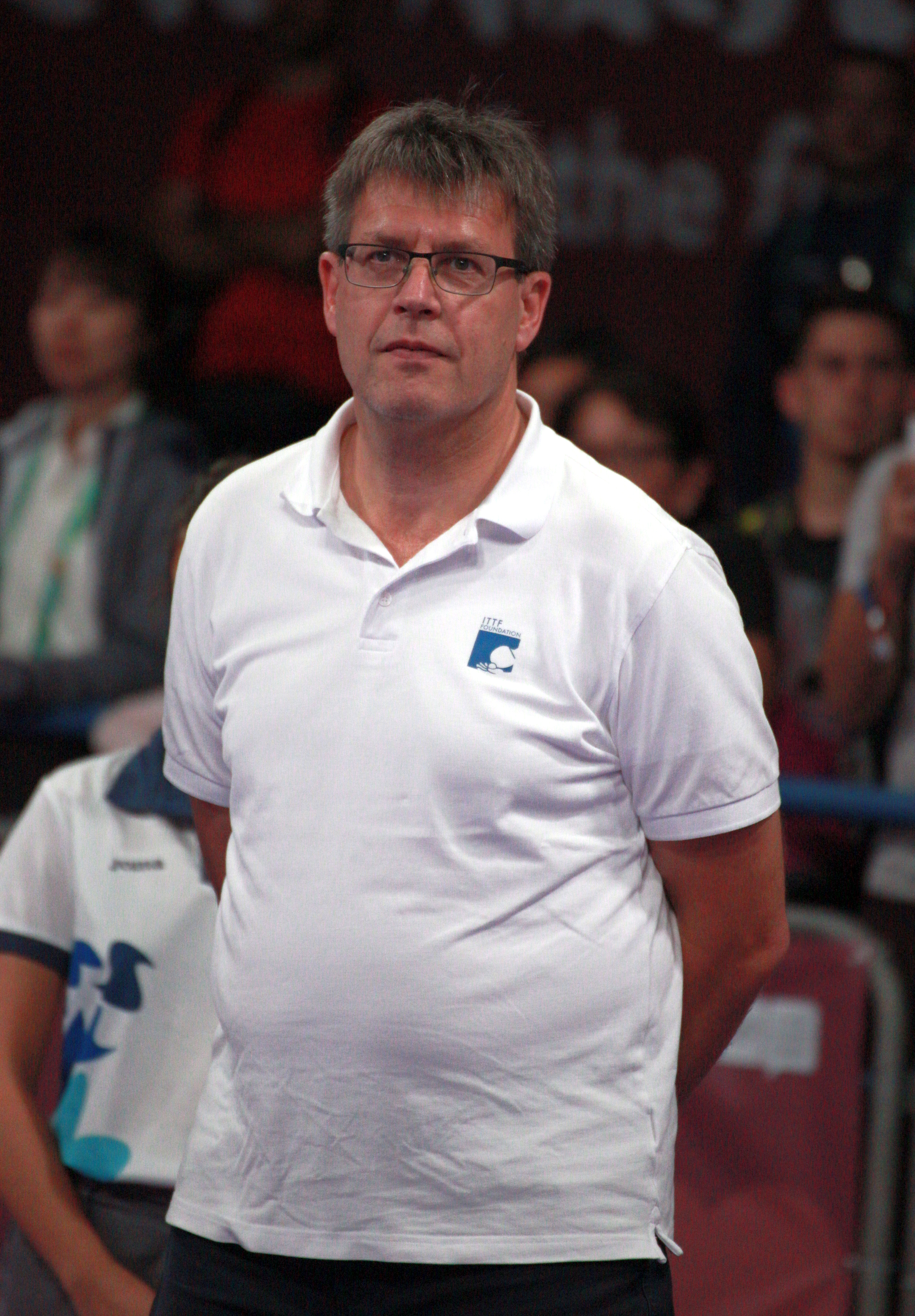
Weikert in 2018

Thomas Weikert (born 24 March 1961) is a German sports official. Born in Hadamar, he was the president of the International Table Tennis Federation (ITTF) from 31 May 2017 to October 2021, when Petra Sörling took the office. Formerly the Deputy President, Thomas Weikert became President in 2014 when Adham Sharara, who had held the office since 1999, assumed the role of Chair and Honorary President of the International Table Tennis Federation. As ITTF President, he is also the ex officio member and President of the Governing Board of ITTF Foundation.

Since 2021, he is President of the German Olympic Sports Confederation.
