= Britt Bohlin Olsson =

Swedish politician (born 1956)

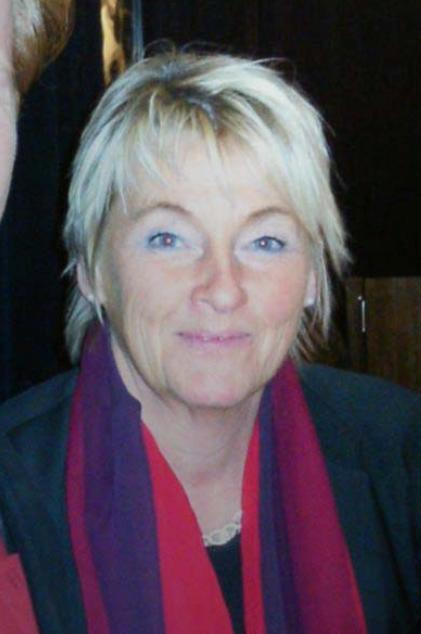
Olsson in Stockholm in 2014

Britt Bohlin Olsson (born 1956) is a Swedish Social Democratic politician, who served as Secretary-General of the Nordic Council since 2014 until 2021. She was a member of the Riksdag from 1988 to 2008. She served as County Governor of Jämtland County from 2008 to 2014, and was replaced in the Riksdag by Renée Jeryd.
