= Astrid Thors =

Finnish politician (born 1957)

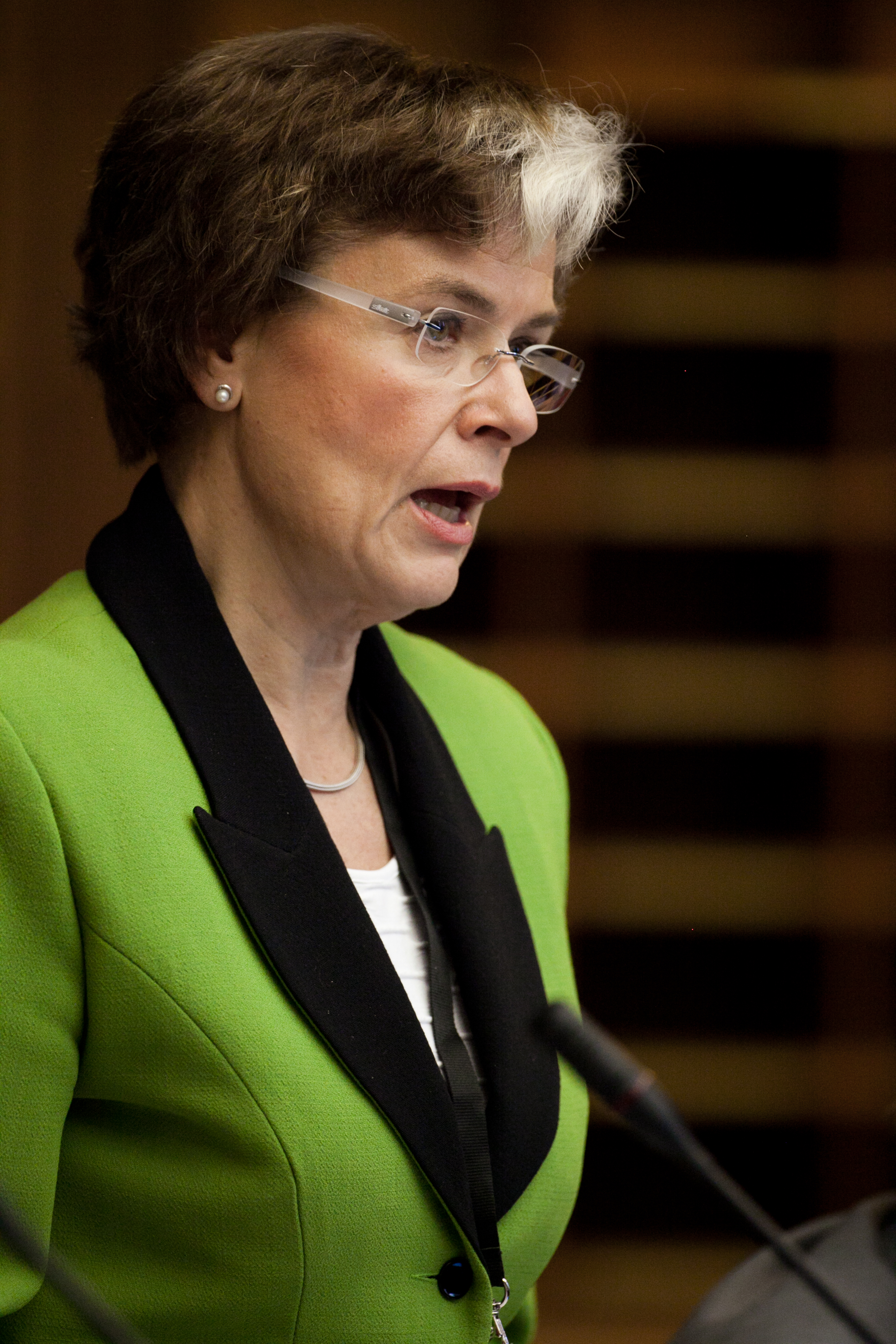

Member of the Finnish Parliament
- In office 2004–2013

OSCE High Commissioner on National Minorities
- In office 20 August 2013 – 19 August 2016

Minister of Migration and European Affairs
- In office 19 April 2007 – 21 June 2011

Member of the European Parliament for Finland
- In office 11 November 1996 – 19 July 2003

Personal details
- Born: Astrid Gunilla Margareta Thors; 6 November 1957 (age 68) Helsinki, Finland
- Party: Swedish People's Party of Finland
- Spouse: Juhani Turunen (m. 2004)
- Education: Helsinki University (Master of Laws)
- Occupation: Politician
- Website: www.astridthors.net

Astrid Gunilla Margareta Thors (born 6 November 1957) was a Member of the Finnish Parliament from 2003 to 2013. A Swedish-speaking Finnish politician, formerly of the Swedish People's Party, Thors is a Candidate of Law and held several senior jobs before becoming a Member of the European Parliament in 1996 where she worked until 2004. From 2005 to 2007 she chaired the Swedish Assembly of Finland.

After the 2007 elections she was chosen to be the new Minister of Migration and European Affairs in Matti Vanhanen's second cabinet.

During 2007 and 2011 Thors became a target of the increasing anti-immigration and anti-European Union sentiment. She received death threats that were consequently investigated by the police, and faced a lot of criticism, in parliament and especially on chat and blogging sites. This was regardless of the fact that during her term, the Finnish immigration policy continued to tighten outside the EU directives. The critique Minister Thors faced subsequently led to a decision not to continue this ministerial position in Prime Minister Katainen's government, and immigration policy was returned under the Interior Minister's wings and EU policy was given to the new position of the Minister of European Affairs and Foreign Trade.

From 20 August 2013 to 19 August 2016 she was at the position of OSCE High Commissioner on National Minorities. At this post she was preceded by Ambassador Knut Vollebaek of Norway and succeeded by Ambassador Lamberto Zannier of Italy.

Thors went to the Swedish-language co-educational school Nya svenska samskolan.

== Personal life ==
In 2004, Thors married Juhani Terho Antero Turunen.

== Sources ==
- CV of Astrid Thors

Preceded by post created	Minister for EU and immigration (Finland); 2007-2011	Succeeded by Päivi Räsänen (as Minister of Internal Affairs), Alexander Stubb (as Minister for European Affairs and Foreign Trade)
