= Didacus Jules =

Saint Lucian educator

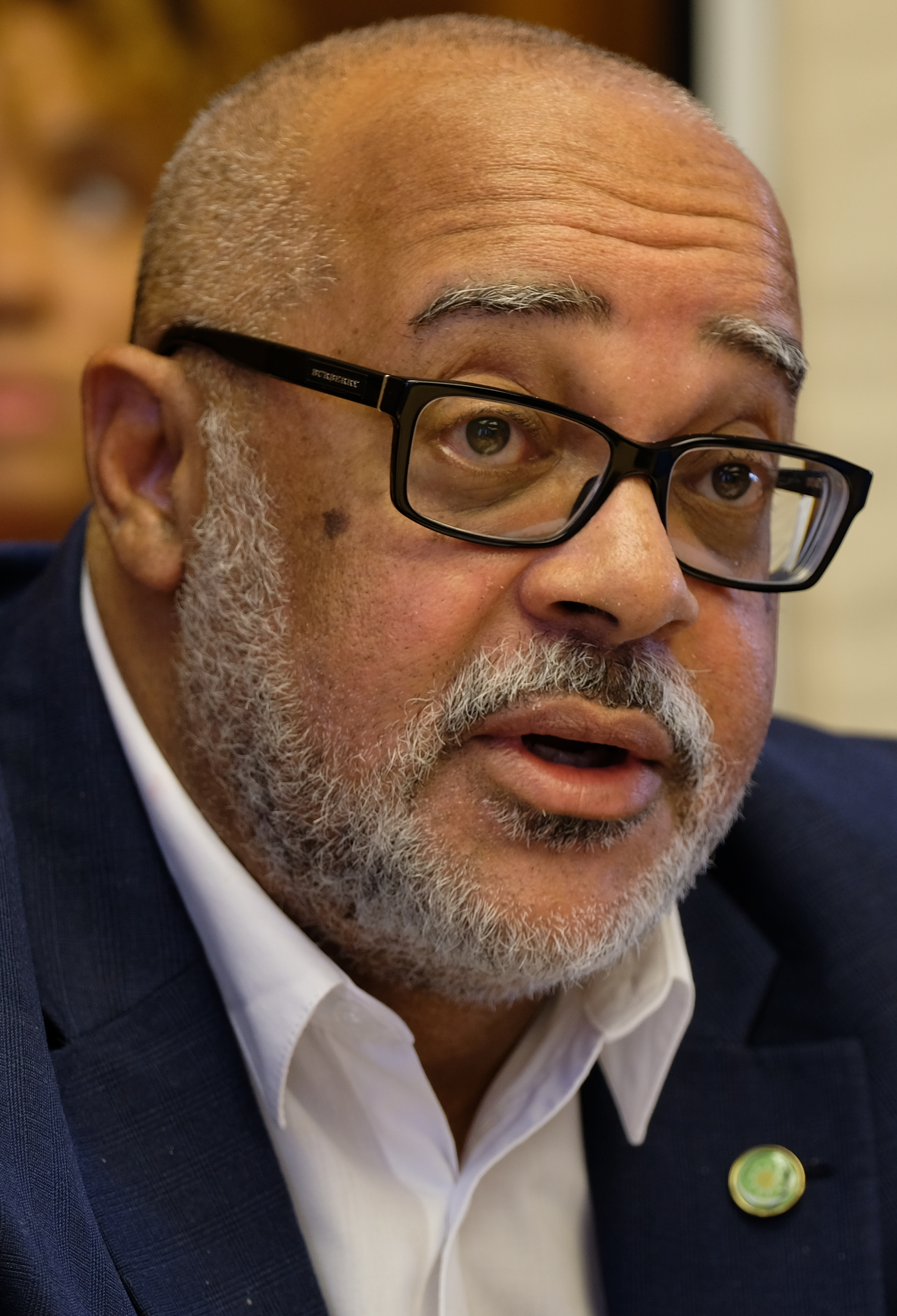
Didacus Jules in 2019

Didacus Jules is the Director General of the Organization of Eastern Caribbean States.

== Early life ==
Born in St. Lucia, Jules is recognized as a radical educator. He was influenced by the work of Paulo Freire and his early work included pioneering literacy work in prisons in St. Lucia (Eastern Caribbean). He was a principal actor in the National Literacy Campaign in Grenada during the 1979 revolution. He later served simultaneously as Chief Education Officer and Permanent Secretary for Education, Youth, Culture, Women, and Social Affairs in Grenada. He serves on the International Journal of African and African American Studies Editorial Group.

Following the demise of the revolution, he served as an education consultant, helping to establish mass literacy programs in St. Lucia, Dominica, St. Vincent, and other parts of the Caribbean. He worked internationally with multilateral agencies such as CIDA, the World Bank, SIDA and assisted the African National Congress in developing adult education programs for its cadres.

He served as Permanent Secretary for Education and Human Resource Development in the Ministry of Education, HRD, Youth, and Sports in St. Lucia from 1997 to 2004. He holds a BA (Hons) in English from the University of the West Indies in Barbados, an MSc in Curriculum and Instruction from the University of Wisconsin–Madison, an MBA from the University of the West Indies in Barbados, and a PhD in Curriculum and Instruction and Education Policy from UW–Madison.

He served as Vice President of Human Resources at Cable & Wireless St Lucia during the challenging period of its transition from monopoly to sector liberalization.

Following a four-year stint in that capacity, he was hired as Registrar and CEO of the Caribbean Examinations Council, in which role he served for eight years, leading a thorough modernization of the Council.

He has written extensively on critical education, education policy, and public sector reform.
