= Secretary-General of the Caribbean Community =

The Secretary General of the Caribbean Community is the chief executive officer of the Community and the head of its principal administrative organ, the CARICOM Secretariat.

According to both the Original and Revised Treaty of Chaguaramas, the Secretary-General is appointed by the Conference of Heads of Government, on the recommendation of the Community Council of Ministers (and previously the Common Market Council in the Original Treaty), for a term not exceeding five years and may be reappointed by the Conference.

The Secretary-General, subject to the Organs of the Community and in accordance with various regulations, performs the following functions:

- representing the Community;
- developing, as mandated, decisions of competent Organs of the Community into implementable proposals;
- identifying and mobilising, as required, external resources to implement decisions at the regional level and undertake studies and develop decisions on relevant issues into implementable proposals;
- implementing, as mandated, decisions at the regional level for the achievement of Community objectives;
- implementing, with the consent of the Member State concerned, Community decisions which do not require legislative or administrative action by national authorities;
- monitoring and reporting on, as mandated, implementation of Community decisions;
- initiating or developing proposals for consideration and decision by the competent Organs in order to achieve Community objectives
- and such other functions assigned by the Conference or other competent Organs.

The current Secretary-General is Carla Barnett (Belize), who was elected in May 2021 to succeed Irwin LaRocque (Dominica; appointed in 2011) as secretary-general.

All Secretaries-General, including the Secretaries-General of CARIFTA, have resided at Colgrain House on Camp Street, Georgetown, Guyana.

== Secretaries-General ==
Caribbean Free Trade Agreement
Name	Beginning of term	End of term	Country
Frederick L. Cozier	1968	1969	Barbados
William Demas	1969	1973	Trinidad and Tobago
Caribbean Community
Name	Beginning of term	End of term	Country
William Demas	1973	1974	Trinidad and Tobago
Sir Alister McIntyre	1974	August 1977	Grenada
Joseph Tyndall (acting)	August 1977	August 1978	Guyana
Kurleigh King	November 1978	September 1983	Barbados
Roderick Rainford	September 1983	August 1992	Jamaica
Edwin W. Carrington	August 1992	December 2010	Trinidad and Tobago
Lolita Applewhaite (acting)	January 2011	August 2011	Barbados
Irwin LaRocque	August 2011	August 2021	Dominica
Carla Barnett	August 2021	present	Belize

The second (and last) Secretary-General of CARIFTA, Mr. William Demas, became the first Secretary-General of the CARICOM. Mr. Demas had been instrumental in the transition from CARIFTA to the Caribbean Community, publishing a booklet in 1972 entitled "From CARIFTA to the Caribbean Community" wherein he outlined policies for deepening the integration process.
