= Olumuyiwa Benard Aliu =

Nigerian politician

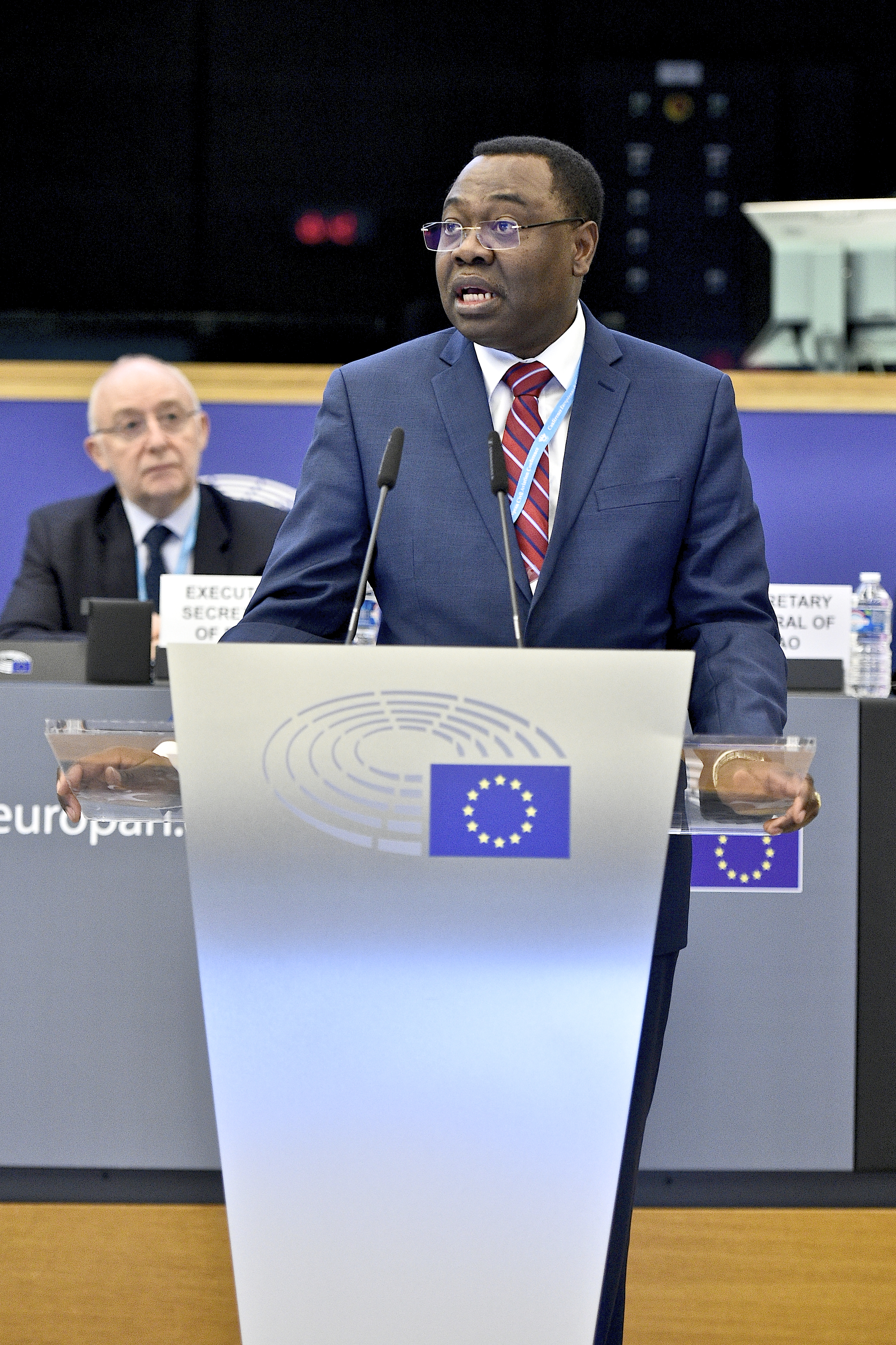
- Aliu in 2018
- Born: 13 April 1960 (age 66); Ikare, Ondo State, Nigeria
- Education: Kiev Institute of Civil Aviation Engineers PhD. in Aeronautical Engineering, PhD in Aviation Law (Hon)
- Employer: ICAO
- Known for: No Country Left Behind, CORSIA MBM Agreement
- Title: Dr.

Olumuyiwa Benard Aliu (born 13 April 1960) was the fifth and past President of the Council of the International Civil Aviation Organization (ICAO). Among many notable accomplishments since taking office, he has been recognized most widely for his diplomatic determination and leadership in forging global consensus on the CORSIA MBM, a carbon offsetting scheme, at ICAO's 39th Assembly in 2016, and has helped to refocus ICAO on the assistance and capacity-building aspects of its mandate since taking office in 2014, under the No Country Left Behind initiative.

President Aliu had previously served as the Representative of Nigeria to ICAO, during which time he was the First Vice-President of the Council and chaired many of the Council's major committees. Prior to that, he held various positions and responsibilities with Nigeria and African aviation institutions. His significant contributions to air transport development in Africa during his 30-year career in aviation has been recognized by way of an African Airlines Association (AFRAA) Individual Achievement Award (2011) and African Aviation Leadership Individual Achievement Award (2010).
