= Li Yong (politician, born 1951) =

Director General of the United Nations Industrial Development Organization

- 李勇
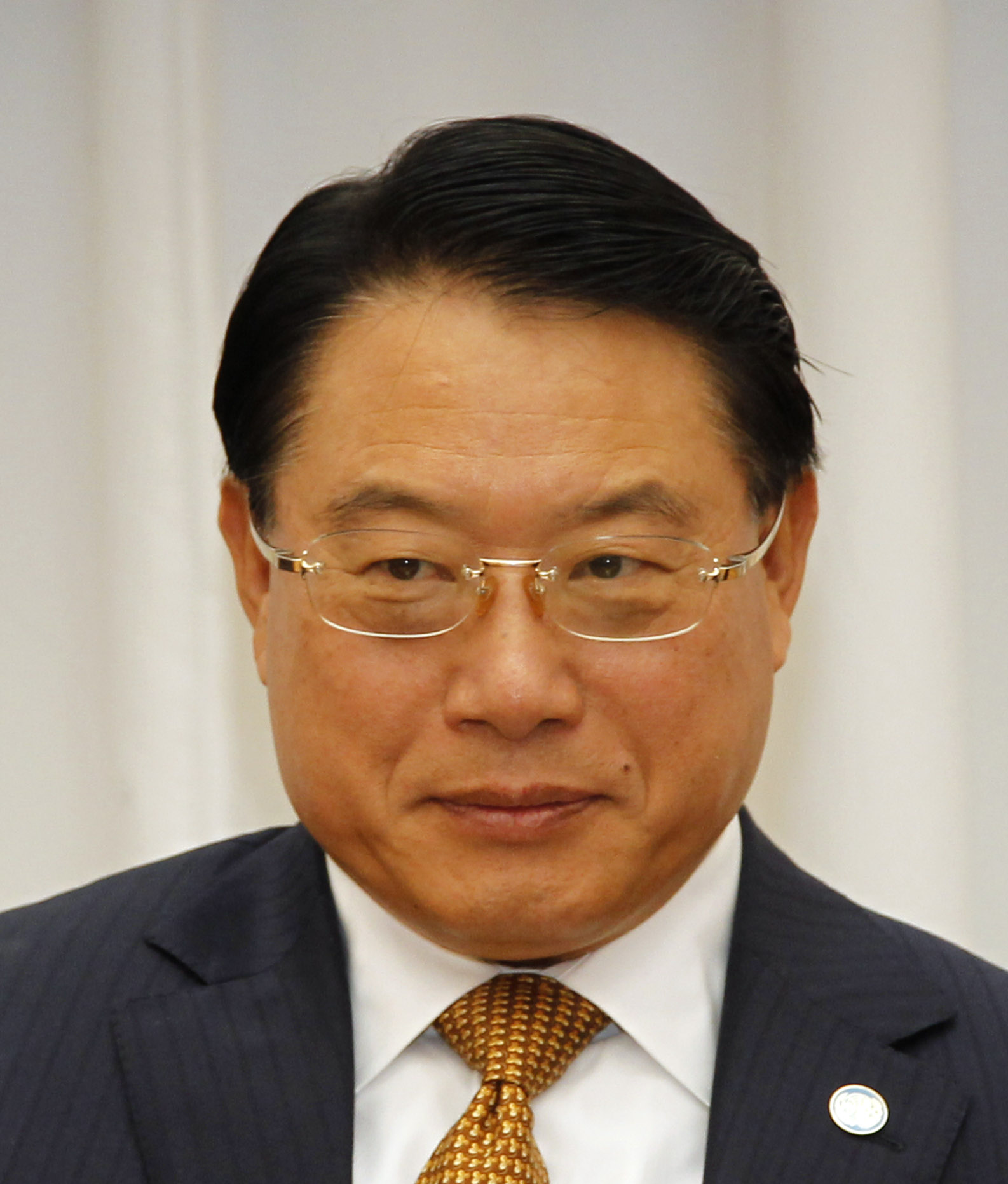

Director-General, UNIDO
- In office July 2013 – November 2021
- Preceded by: Kandeh Yumkella
- Succeeded by: Gerd Müller

Personal details
- Born: October 1951 (age 74) Jining, Shandong
- Party: Chinese Communist Party
- Occupation: politician, economist, UN executive

Li Yong (Chinese: 李勇; born October 1951) is the former Vice-Minister of the Ministry of Finance of China and the former Director General of the United Nations Industrial Development Organization.

== Biography ==
Li was born in Jining, Shandong, China to Han parents. He joined the Chinese Communist Party in 1973. Li received a master's degree in economics following his graduation from the Research Institute for Fiscal Science of the Ministry of Finance later that year.

From 1985 to 1988 he served as first and second secretary to the United Nations Mission from China, and became Director of the World Bank Ministry of Finance in 1989. He served at this post for a year. Following that, he became an advisor to the World Bank and served under this post until 1996. Li was thus promoted to Director-General, and to Executive Director in 1996. He filled this position until 1998. In 1999, he became the Secretary-General at the Chinese Institute of Certified Public Accountants and served simultaneously as Assistant Minister at the Chinese Ministry of Finance from 2000 to 2002. He quit his Assistant Ministership to be promoted Vice Minister in 2003.

On May 7, 2006, Li presented his prediction of a 25 percent drop in the value of the U.S. dollar. This caused debate on the creation of an Asian Currency Unit (ACU), an index that tries to capture the value of an Asian currency by taking an average on several of them. One of his highest priorities as Vice Minister was to fight inflation by promoting production in agriculture.

On 24 June 2013, Li was elected by UNIDO's Industrial Development Board to succeed Kandeh Yumkella as Director General of UNIDO. He was appointed Director General by a special session of the Organization's General Conference on 28 June 2013.
