= Sindiso Ngwenya =

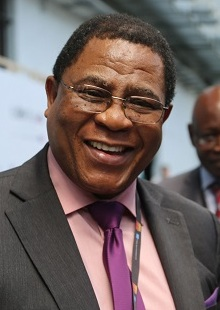
- Born: 16 April 1951 (age 75); Zimbabwe
- Citizenship: Zimbabwe
- Education: University Not Stated (Bachelor of Arts in Economics and Geography); University Not Stated (Master of Science in Transportation & Traffic Planning)
- Occupations: Business Executive & Business Administrator
- Years active: 1976 — present
- Known for: Administration, Management
- Title: Secretary General; COMESA
- Spouse: Mrs. Ngwenya

Sindiso Ndema Ngwenya, is a Zimbabwean economist and transportation expert. He was the Secretary General of the Common Market for Eastern and Southern Africa (COMESA). Prior to that, he served as the Assistant Secretary General of COMESA in charge of Programmes, from 1998 until 2008.

== Overview ==
Sindiso Ngwenya was appointed as secretary general at COMESA in May 2008. He replaced Erastus J. O. Mwencha, who was secretary general from 1998 until 2008.

== Background and education ==
He was born on 16 April 1951. He holds the degree of Bachelor of Arts in Economics and Geography. He also holds the degree of Master of Science in Transportation and Traffic Planning.

== Other considerations ==
He is married and is the father of three children. Sindiso Ngwenya serves as the chairman, board of governors, Food, Agriculture and Natural Resources Policy Analysis Network (FANRPAN), a policy analysis and policy dialogue forum, promoting and supporting an Africa that is free from hunger and poverty. He also serves as the vice chairperson of the African Trade Insurance Agency (ATI) board of directors.

== See also ==
- EAC
- SADC
- PTA Bank
- Harare
- Gideon Gono
- Erastus Mwencha
