= Irwin LaRocque =

Dominica diplomat

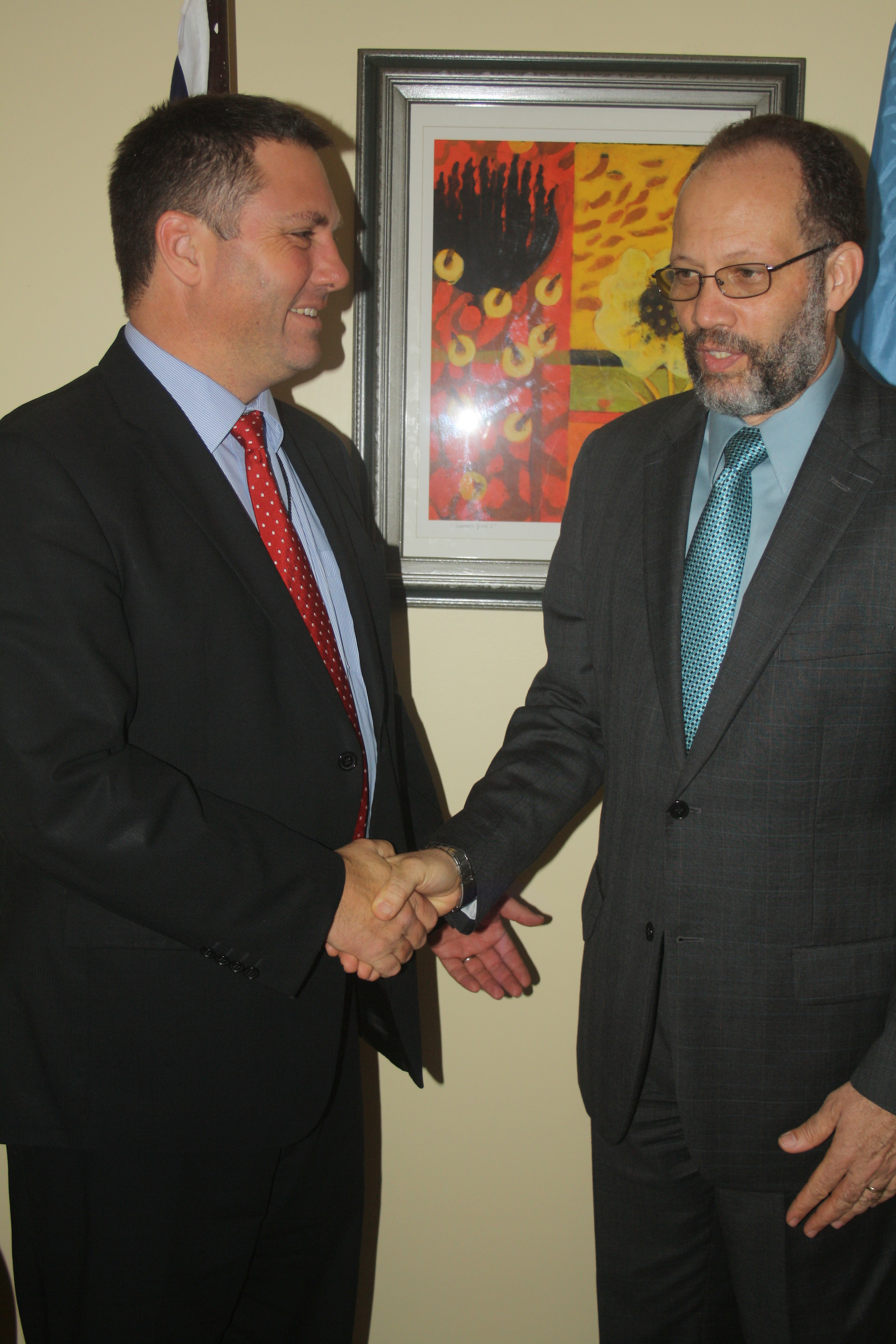
LaRocque (right) with Richard Marles (left) in 2012

Irwin LaRocque OCC is the immediate former Secretary-General of the Caribbean Community, who was appointed in 2011. He is from Dominica.

In 2022, LaRocque was awarded the Order of the Caribbean Community, the highest award that can be conferred upon a Caribbean national.
