= David Grimes (meteorologist) =

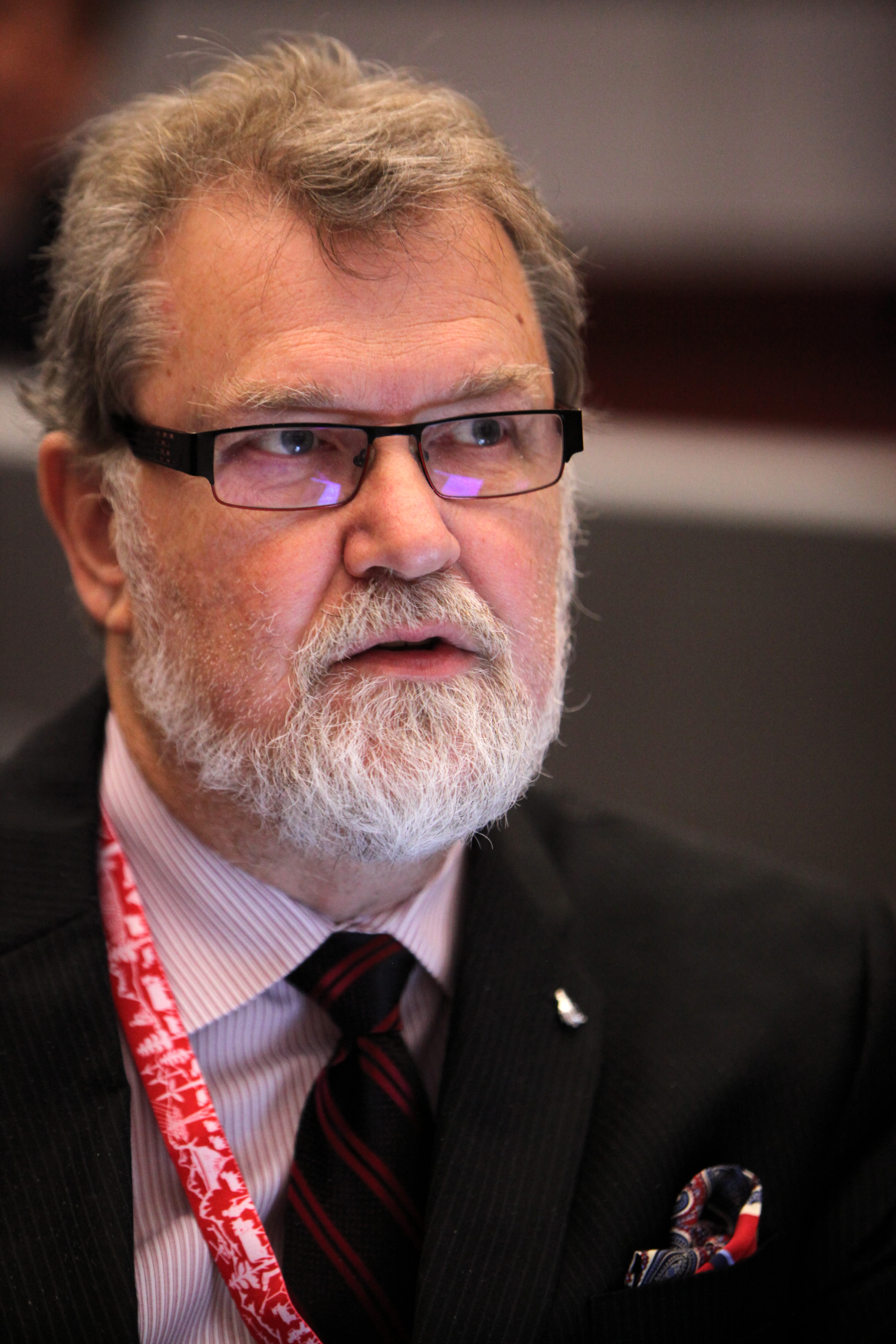
- David Grimes during the 10th Plenary of the Group on Earth Observations (GEO-X) in Geneva.
- Alma mater: Brock University
- Occupation: Meteorologist
- Employer: Environment and Climate Change Canada
- Awards: Member of the Order of Canada (2020)

David Grimes CM is a career meteorologist who studied mathematics and nuclear and quantum physics at Brock University in Ontario, Canada. He has been assistant deputy minister of Environment and Climate Change Canada in charge of the Meteorological Service of Canada since July 2006. From 2011 to 2019, he was elected president of the World Meteorological Organization by its 189 members, succeeding Alexander Bedritskiy of Russia.

In 2020, he was appointed as a Member of the Order of Canada. The same year, Grimes was given the International Meteorological Organization Prize.
