= Jochen Schmidt (dance critic) =

German journalist and dance critic

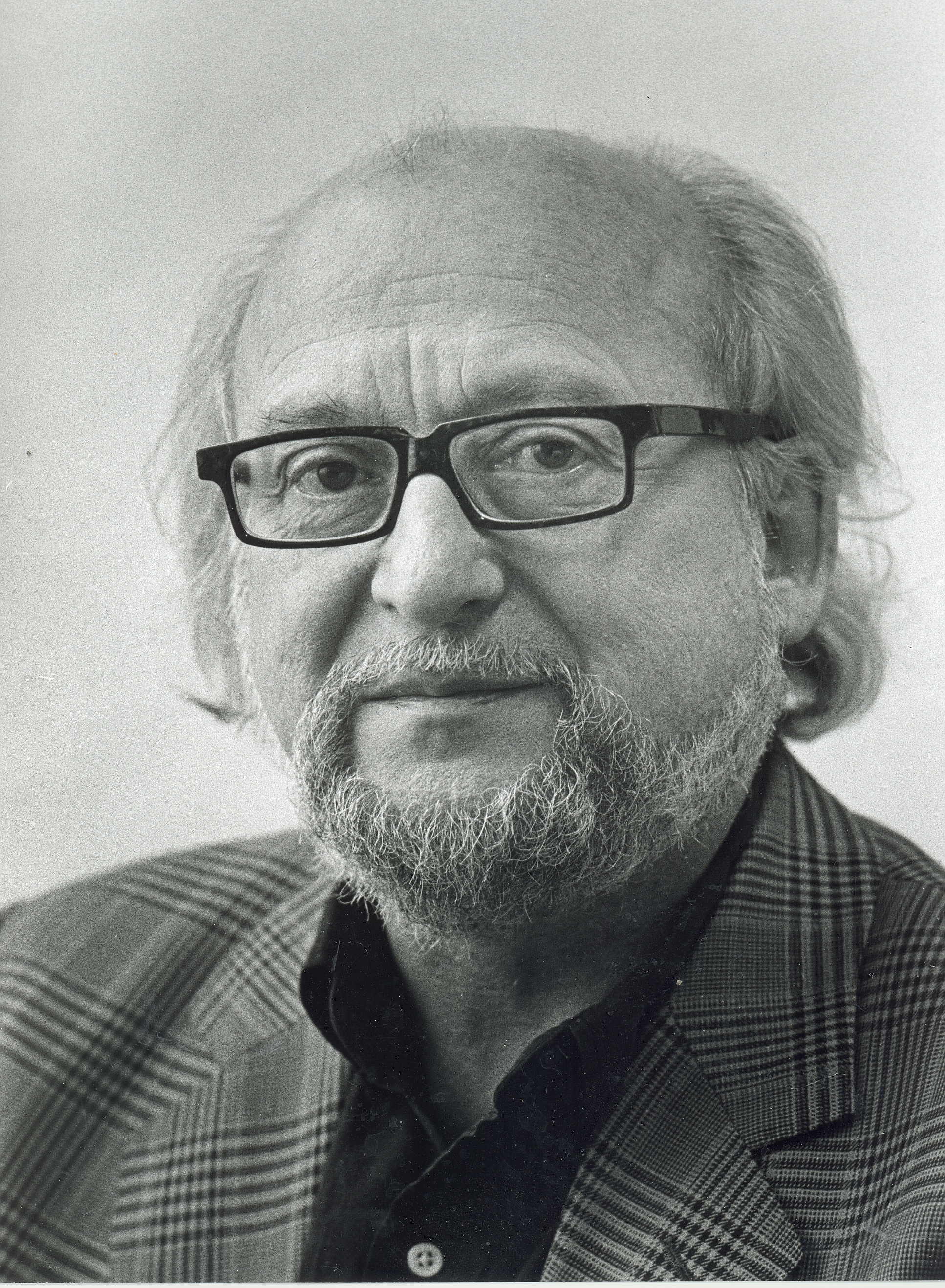
- Schmidt in 2010
- Born: 22 September 1936; Borken, Germany
- Died: 10 October 2010 (aged 74); Düsseldorf, North Rhine-Westphalia, Germany
- Occupations: Journalist; Author; Festival director
- Organizations: Frankfurter Allgemeine Zeitung; Die Welt; Tanzfestival Nordrhein-Westfalen

Jochen Schmidt (22 September 1936 – 10 October 2010) was a German journalist and book author, especially as a dance theatre expert. He became known through more than 30 years as a critic in the Frankfurter Allgemeine Zeitung, reviewing also non-fiction books on dance and crime novels, and working for other papers and broadcasters. He closely watched Pina Bausch's Tanztheater Wuppertal, and published a biography of her. He wrote a book about the history of dance in the 20th century, observing mainly European, but also international innovations.

== Life and work ==
Schmidt was born in Borken. After studying economics (Nationalökonomie) at the University of Münster, the University of Cologne, and the Ludwig-Maximilians-Universität München, he began work as a journalist with the Düsseldorf Der Mittag.

From 1968 to 2003, Schmidt wrote dance theatre reviews as a critic for the Frankfurter Allgemeine Zeitung (FAZ). He consistently reviewed choreographies by Johann Kresnik, Susanne Linke, Reinhild Hoffmann and Gerhard Bohner. Schmidt promoted choreographers Hans van Manen and Martin Schläpfer as well as Henrietta Horn and Daniel Goldin.

Schmidt had a special interest in Pina Bausch's Tanztheater Wuppertal, as an attentive and seismographic observer of her works. He travelled to Amsterdam, Bombay, Delhi, Paris, Rome and Vienna where her productions were performed. He shared her view that art and life should be closely connected. In 1998, he published a biography of her, entitled Tanzen gegen die Angst (Dancing against angst) as a summary of his knowledge and observations of her life and work.

From 1984 to 1994, Schmidt was director of the Tanzfestival Nordrhein-Westfalen. From 2003 to August 2010, he reviewed dance theatre events for the daily Die Welt. In his reviews, he first described what was seen on stage as objectively as possible, before entering interpretation and evaluation.

In his magnum opus, Tanzgeschichte des zwanzigsten Jahrhunderts in einem Band (Dance History of the Twentieth Century in One Volume), Schmidt argued that it was obvious that the 20th century was less a century of the dancers than that of choreographers. Therefore, after a short historical introduction, the book offered mainly profiles of important dance directors. Schmidt assigned the biographies, including descriptions of their works, to a total of 22 thematic chapters, to which he added historical, cultural, geographical and aesthetic information. The photos, however, were "often outdated or not very meaningful", according to a review in the NZZ. He included aspects of dance internationally, such as in India, Japan and Taiwan. The book contains, for example, a profiles of Chandralekha, an Indian innovator of dance. While Schmidt remained cool regarding well-known dance exponents such as Anne Teresa de Keersmaeker and William Forsythe, he enthusiastically reviewed the pieces of the Taiwanese Lin Hwai-min, filled with Asian harmony and beauty.

Schmidt was also an interested reader of crime literature, reviewing crime novels for the FAZ, the Basler Zeitung, Brigitte, the Südwestfunk and Radio Bremen from the early 1960s. He wrote a Type History of the Crime Novel and was a member of the jury of the Krimibestenliste.

In a letter to Die Welt, Schmidt wrote in August 2010 that his health was steadily deteriorating, and he could no longer travel and review. Schmidt died later that year in Düsseldorf at the age of 74. His dance-related estate is preserved in the Deutsches Tanzarchiv Köln.

== Publications ==
=== As author ===
- Tanzgeschichte des zwanzigsten Jahrhunderts in einem Band. Mit 101 Choreographenporträts. Henschel, Berlin 2002, ISBN 3-89487-430-9.
- Tanzen gegen die Angst. Pina Bausch. Biography. Econ and List, Munich 1998, ISBN 3-612-26513-X. 4th edition 2002, ISBN 3-548-60259-2.
- Isadora Duncan: Ich sehe Amerika tanzen List, Munich 2000, ISBN 3-612-65051-3.
- Tanztheater in Deutschland Propyläen-Verlag, Frankfurt,1992, ISBN 3-549-05206-5.
- Gangster, Opfer, Detektive. Eine Typengeschichte des Kriminalromans. Ullstein, Frankfurt 1989, ISBN 3-548-34488-7.

=== As editor ===
- with Hans-Dieter Dyroff: Tanzkultur in der Bundesrepublik Deutschland: zu Überlieferung und aktueller Situation. Dt. Unesco-Kommission, Bonn 1990, ISBN 3-927907-03-0.
