= 1882 in Iran =

- Decades
- See also: Other events of 1882; Years in Iran

The following lists events that happened during 1882 in Qajar era.

== Incumbents ==
- Monarch: Naser al-Din Shah Qajar

== Births ==
- June 16 – Mohammad Mosaddegh, former Prime Minister of Iran.
- November 19 – Abol-Ghasem Kashani, Iranian ayatollah.
- December 13 – Hossein Ala', Iranian politician (1881-1964), Prime Minister of Iran.
- ? – Aref Qazvini, Iranian poet, lyricist and musician.
- ? – Assadollah Hosseinpoor, Iranian military commander.
- ? – Ghaffar Djalal, Iranian diplomat.
- ? – Mahmud Mahmud, Iranian politician.
- ? – Mirza Ahmad Ashtiani, Iranian philosopher.
- ? – Mohammad-Hosayn Ayrom, Iranian general.
- ? – Morteza-Qoli Bayat, Iranian politician.
- ? – Mostafa Adl, Iranian diplomat, politician and writer.
- ? – Mozaffar Alam, Iranian military officer and politician.
- ? – Rais-Ali Delvari, national hero of Iran.
- ? – Sayed Ali Asghar Kurdistani, Iranian singer.
- ? – Sediqeh Dowlatabadi, Iranian activist.
