= Tania Imani (Habimana) =

Rwandan-Belgian entrepreneur

- Born: Tania; Saint-Martin-d'Hères
- Other name: Habimana
- Citizenship: Rwanda
- Education: Bocconi University; Cardiff University; University of Konstanz
- Occupation: Television presenter
- Years active: 2021 present
- Employer: CNBC Africa
- Known for: Entrepreneur Television presenter

Tania Imani (formerly Tania Habimana) is a Rwandan Belgian entrepreneur and television presenter.

== Background ==
Tania served as the anchor for CNBC Africa's primetime daily financial markets and business show Closing Bell, broadcast on weekdays on DSTV Channel 410 between 2021 and 2024.

Prior to this, Imani served as CEO of NONZēRO Africa, an integrated marketing company with focus on creating impact programs and enterprise development campaigns in Africa. She founded the company with Desiree Brouwer in 2016, and has since grown as an SME marketing agency—assisting small business expansions using advanced data-based digital marketing techniques. Tania is also the co-founder of the Threads Stitched by Standard Bank, an 18-week accelerator built in collaboration with Standard Bank, Mercedes-Benz, EOH, SA Tourism, Kaya FM and Mecer Electronics, designed to teach fashion entrepreneurs about the business side of fashion.

Tania also co-founded FASHIONTech™ Africa hackathon & conference, a first-of-its-kind 24-hour fashion technology hackathon & conference which took place in Johannesburg, South Africa in April 2018.

She also hosted the television show called Tailored Business. The show follows her suit entrepreneur and tailor journey, as she travels across Africa making suits for prominent business people and personalities. As she gets the measurement of her clients, she interviews them on their journey towards success, challenges and opportunities on the African continent.

Tania was recognised by the European Commission for her efforts to promote the internationalisation of youth. She is now the face of the British Council for the Erasmus+ Youth Mobility program.

In 2024, following her marriage, Tania adopted her husband's surname, Imani, marking a new chapter in her personal and professional journey.

== Early life ==
Tania Imani (formerly, Tania Habimana) was born in Saint-Martin-d'Hères in France. She attended Palmerston Primary School in Barry, Vale of Glamorgan.

She attended secondary school at the Institut Notre-Dame de Bonne Espérence in Braine-le-Comte in Belgium and later attended, Cardiff University where she studied Bachelor of Science in Business Management & German Language. She also spent a year as an Erasmus student at University of Konstanz. During her time at Cardiff University, Tania founded a dance group called Slash Hip Hop Dance as a means to fund her studies.

After some years in the corporate world, Tania later studied at the Erasmus University Rotterdam in the Netherlands. She obtained a Master of Science in International Management, a program part of the Global Alliance in Management Education, with which she also studied Fashion & Luxury Brand Management at Bocconi University in Milan, Italy .

== Business career ==
=== Early career ===
Tania started her career as an eCommerce analyst and digital marketer working for companies such as Levi Strauss & Co and luxury menswear brand Suitsupply.

=== Suitsupply's Market-Entry into Sub-Sahara Africa ===
==== eCommerce in Africa ====
After a mid-career study break and completing her master's degree in International Management, Tania returned to Suitsupply as GM for Sub-Sahara Africa and led the expansion of Suitsupply into Sub-Sahara Africa while she was only 23. Led by Tania's eCommerce experience, the company was the first European retailer to integrate local payment systems such as M-Pesa, Airtel Money and YuCash onto their eCommerce platform. The company first launched an eCommerce platform that conduct deliveries across Sub-Sahara Africa within 4 business days.

==== Store in Johannesburg ====
The company had planned a Pan African, multi-channel roll-out, which started with the opening of the brick and mortar store in Johannesburg in June 2014.

The store was in a 2-storey luxury Mansion in Johannesburg's upmarket neighbourhood Hyde Park, Gauteng.

==== Pop-Up in Nigeria ====
Tania also organised pop-ups in Lagos, Nigeria.

== Television host career ==
=== Tailored Business TV show ===
Synopsis : "A young female entrepreneur travels across Africa making suits for successful business people.She uses the suit fitting appointment as an opportunity to interview her prominent clients and gain tips & insights on how to grow her own pan-African business."

Tania created the show to profile African entrepreneurial excellence and share real, practical tips and advice.

The show was sponsored by airline KLM and automobile brand Mercedes-Benz.

=== VC4A Academy host and expert ===
Tania is the theoretical content host of the VC4A Startup Academy online videos series.

=== Closing Bell host ===
In 2021, Tania became the permanent host of CNBC Africa's prime time daily show Closing Bell

Closing Bell takes a close-up look at how the markets are moving on that day, what drove them and how investors, as well as analysts, are reacting. They also take a look at macro-economic breaking news and current affairs that have the potential to affect businesses on the continent and provide our audience with the information they need. On the show, Tania interviews analysts, investment managers, executives and CEOs who’ll explain their strategies, share opinions, and provide insights on issues affecting the African business environment.

Notable interviews include His Excellency, Mokgweetsi Masisi president of Botswana, His Excellency, Haitham Al Ghais, OPEC secretary General and Saadia Zahidi, Managing Director of the World Economic Forum

== Entrepreneurial career ==
=== Habimana House Ltd ===
Tania is the founder and majority shareholder of company, Habimana House Ltd, headquartered in London. Habimana House is a multi-faceted production company dedicated to promoting African business success as well as the Diaspora to a global audience.

=== NONZēRO Africa ===
Tania is the co-founder and a shareholder of NONZēRO Africa, headquartered in Johannesburg. The company was founded in 2016 by Desiree Brouwer and Tania Imani (formerly, Tania Habimana) In 2019, Tania was appointed CEO of the organisation. The company is best known for its flagship program, Threads Stitched by Standard Bank, a business of fashion accelerator program deployed in 4 cities in South Africa, as well as Startup Caps, a multimedia campaign spotlighting Africa's leading tech enterprises and connecting them with the visibility and resources needed to secure growth and funding

== Awards and recognition ==
Tania was awarded with two high-profile roles during the Erasmus+ 30 Year campaign. She was nominated as the UK ambassador for this program and was also awarded the UK's nine millionth award. The award was handed to her from the European Parliament President Antonio Tajani.

Tania was selected as a German French Young Leaders in 2018, under the high patronage of Presidents Emmanuel Macron and Frank-Walter Steinmeier. During which, she presented during the inaugural event a talk titled "Needs-based innovation from Africa - What Europe can learn".

Tania was nominated in the category 'Global Hero' of the Digital Female Leader 2018 edition.

Tania was also awarded 'SMME Brand Contributor Of The Year' in 2019, by Brand Summit South Africa.
