= Alí Rodríguez Araque =

Venezuelan Politician, Lawyer & Diplomat

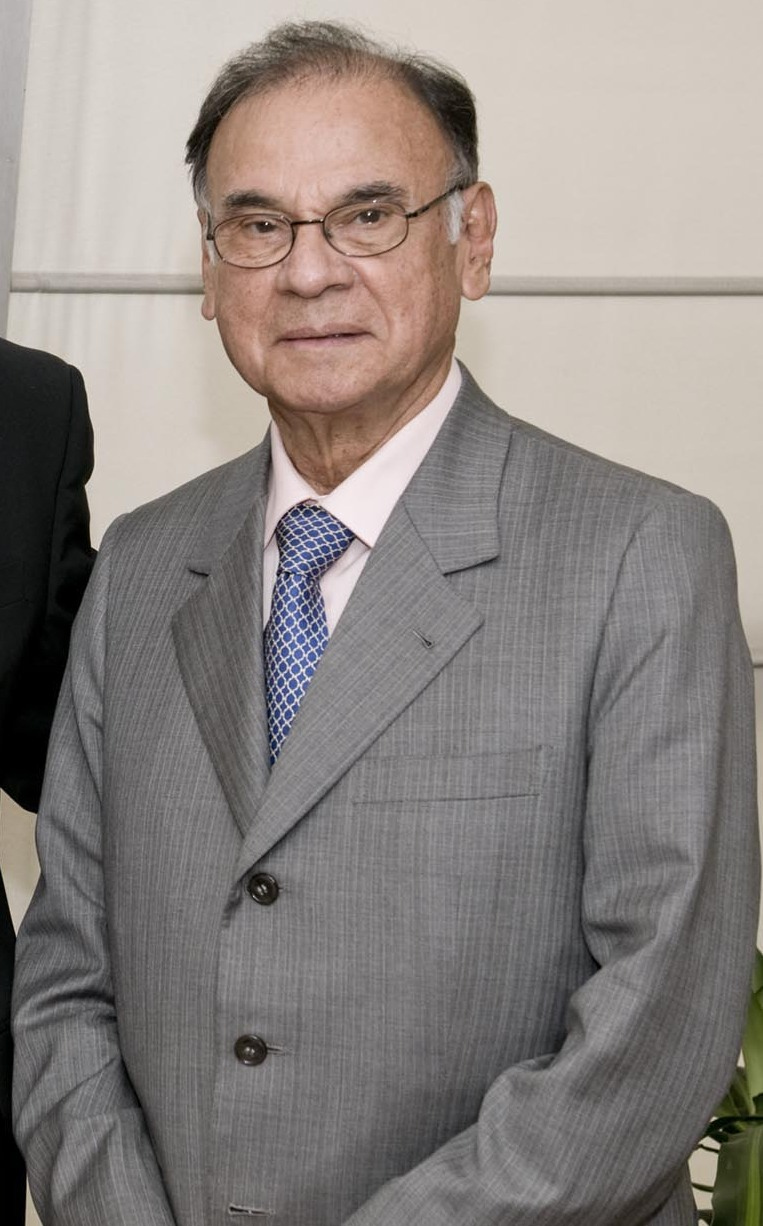
- Alí Rodríguez in 2011

Venezuelan Ambassador to Cuba
- In office 1 September 2014 – 19 November 2018
- Preceded by: Edgardo Antonio Ramírez
- Succeeded by: Adán Chávez

Secretary General of the Union of South American Nations
- In office 11 June 2012 – 31 July 2014
- Preceded by: María Emma Mejía Vélez
- Succeeded by: Ernesto Samper

Minister of Finance of Venezuela
- In office June 2008 – January 2010
- President: Hugo Chavez
- Preceded by: Rafael Isea
- Succeeded by: Jorge Giordani

Minister of Foreign Affairs of Venezuela
- In office 20 November 2004 – 7 August 2006
- President: Hugo Chavez
- Preceded by: Jesús Pérez
- Succeeded by: Nicolás Maduro

22nd Secretary General of OPEC
- In office 1 January 2001 – 30 June 2002
- Preceded by: Rilwanu Lukman
- Succeeded by: Álvaro Silva Calderón

Personal details
- Born: 9 September 1937 Ejido, Mérida, Venezuela
- Died: 19 November 2018 (aged 81) Havana, Cuba
- Party: PPT
- Profession: Politician, diplomat, lawyer

Alí Rodríguez Araque (9 September 1937 – 19 November 2018) was a Venezuelan politician, lawyer, and diplomat. He was the leader of the political party Patria Para Todos ("Fatherland for All") and occupied various positions in the government of President Hugo Chávez, such as oil advisor, General Secretary of OPEC, President of Petróleos de Venezuela (PDVSA), Minister of External Relations and Ambassador to Cuba. He was appointed as Minister of Finance in June 2008. His last occupation was Ambassador of Venezuela in Cuba since 2014 until his death in 2018.

== Career ==
Born in Ejido, Mérida, he received his legal certification from Universidad Central de Venezuela in Caracas in 1961. He studied economics, specialising in crude oil; he wrote several works about the energy sector.

During the 1960s and early 1970s, he was active in the Marxist guerrilla movement operating in Venezuela. He was known as "Commander Fausto", allegedly acting as an explosives expert. He was one of the last guerrilla fighters to put down arms, after the so-called "appeasement" policy (Pacificación) signaled the end of the armed insurgency. He was pardoned and became involved in parliamentary politics, and was elected to the then National Congress. He was minister of energy of Venezuela from 1999, when Chávez took office, until 2000.

In 2000 he was elected secretary-general of OPEC and served from January 2001 to July 2002. He then became president of Venezuela's state-owned oil company Petróleos de Venezuela (PDVSA), where he masterminded the firing of more than 20,000 workers in response to their part in the company's leading role in the Venezuelan general strike of 2002-2003. He remained in that position until November 2004 when Chávez appointed him foreign minister in a cabinet reshuffle. On 1 September 2006, Rodríguez was appointed as Ambassador of Venezuela to Cuba. Later he served some time as Vice President of the United Socialist Party of Venezuela for the Andean region in Venezuela before being appointed as Minister of Finance by Chávez on 15 June 2008. He died in Havana on 19 November 2018 at the age of 81.

== See also ==
- List of Venezuelans
- List of ministers of foreign affairs of Venezuela

Preceded by Rilwanu Lukman	Secretary General of OPEC; January 2001 – July 2002	Succeeded by Álvaro Silva Calderón
Preceded by Jesús Pérez	184th Venezuelan Minister of Foreign Affairs; 20 November 2004 – 7 August 2006	Succeeded by Nicolás Maduro
Preceded by Rafael Isea	Venezuelan Minister of Finance; June 2008 – January 2010	Succeeded by Jorge Giordani
