= Amir Hosseinpour =

Opera director and choreographer

Amir Hosseinpour is an opera director and choreographer who has worked in major opera houses worldwide. He collaborated with directors such as Pierre Audi, founder of the Almeida Theatre, Nigel Lowery, and choreographer Jonathan Lunn. His production of Haydn's Orlando Paladino, co-directed with Nigel Lowery, continues to be broadcast on Sky Arts HD regularly. Some of his biggest productions have been recorded for international DVD releases. His choreography for Michael Tippett's The Midsummer Marriage at the Bavarian State Opera in February 1998 was described as 'stunning' by The Daily Telegraph critic, Rupert Christiansen, and it was also highly praised by Wolfgang Sandner in the Frankfurter Allgemeine Zeitung. Other outstanding reviews for Hosseinpour's work in the German-language Frankfurter Allgemeine Zeitung (FAZ) were for Les Paladins (Rameau) at Basel in December 2004, reviewed by Gerhard Koch, Petrushka at Munich reviewed by Jochen Schmidt in December 1999 and Orphée et Eurydice at the Bavarian State Opera in November 2003.

In April 2013, Hosseinpour created the choreography for the world premiere of The Lost by Philip Glass at Linz, Austria. The title in the original German is Spuren der Verirrten, and the production was described as 'a visual feast' in both The Guardian and the New York Times. His choreography for William Tell at Welsh National Opera in 2014 was described as 'show stopping' in The Telegraph.

Hosseinpour was born in Iran before the Iranian Revolution of 1979 and now lives in London. The opera houses he has worked in include Opera Garnier and Opera Bastille in Paris, Staatsoper Unter den Linden in Berlin, Bayerische Staatsoper in Munich, La Scala in Milan, De Nederlandse Opera in Amsterdam, Bregenz Festival, Opera North in Leeds, and London's Royal Opera House at Covent Garden.

== Personal life ==
Amir Hosseinpour was born in Teheran, Iran, in 1966 to Abdolreza Hosseinpour and his wife, Guity. His maternal grandfather was Fuad Rouhani, founder and first general secretary of OPEC. His grandfather founded the Philarmonic Orchestra of Persia. Under this grandfather's influence, Amir Hosseinpour pursued a career in opera and dance. Hosseinpour's aunt and uncle are Negui and Kamran Diba, the architect of the Tehran Museum of Contemporary Art and first cousin to Empress Farah Pahlavi, née Farah Diba. Amir Hosseinpour's paternal grandfather was Assadollah Hosseinpoor. After the 1979 Iranian revolution, the family fled to France and later, Hosseinpour moved to London, where he now lives.
