= Embassy of the United Arab Emirates, Paris =

Diplomatic mission of the United Arab Emirates to France

Embassy of the United Arab Emirates in Paris
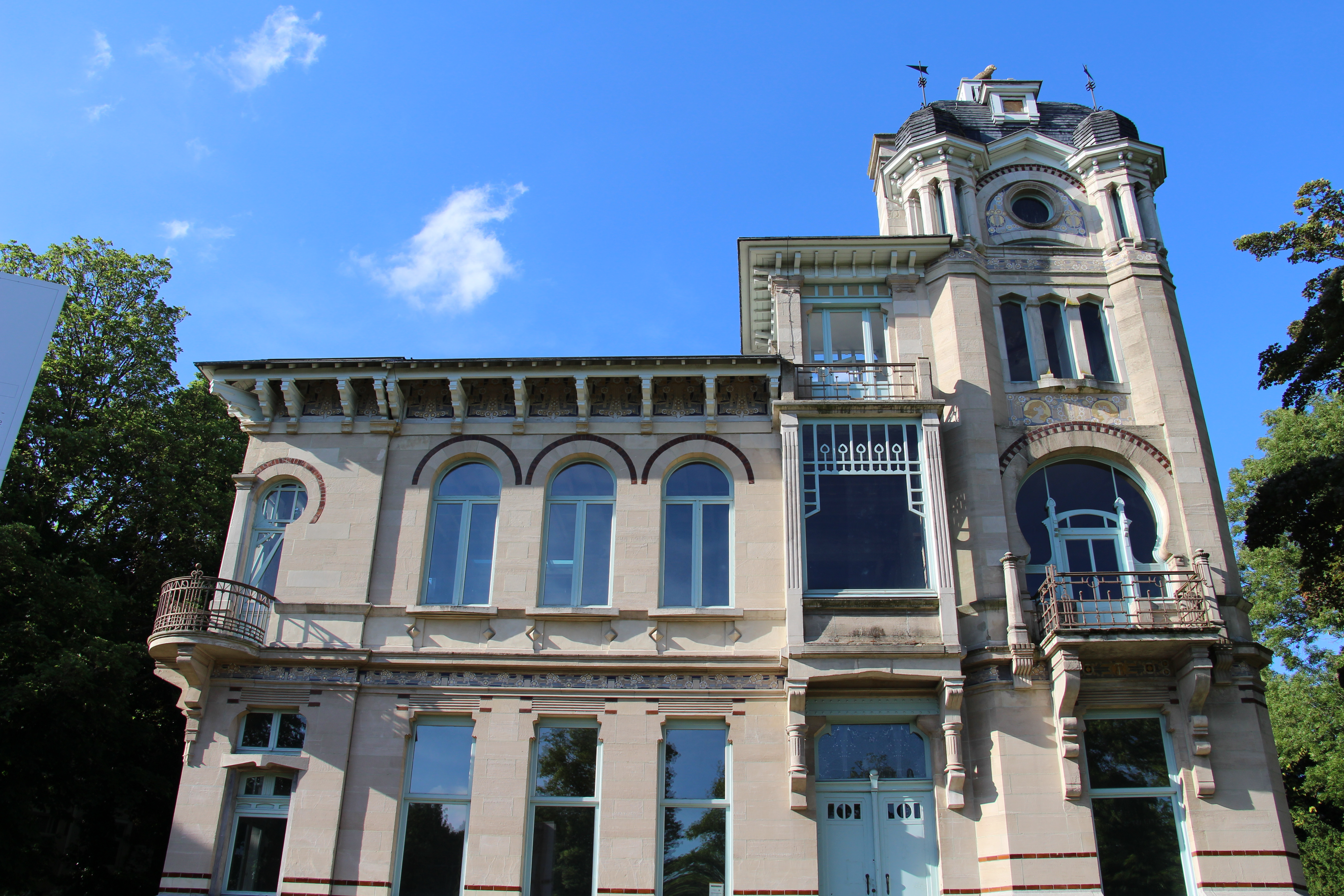
- Entrance to the embassy of the UAE in Paris
- Location: Paris, France
- Address: 2 Boulevard de la Tour-Maubourg, 75007 Paris
- Coordinates: 48°51′43.8″N 2°18′36.6″E
- Ambassador: Fahad Saeed Al Raqbani (since September 2024)
- Website: www.mofa.gov.ae/en/missions/paris

The Embassy of the United Arab Emirates in Paris is the diplomatic mission of the United Arab Emirates (UAE) to the French Republic. It is located at 2 Boulevard de la Tour-Maubourg, in the 7th arrondissement of Paris.

His Excellency Fahad Saeed Al Raqbani is the current ambassador, a post held since September 2024. Previously, he was the UAE's ambassador to Canada.

== History ==
The UAE established its embassy in Paris on 14 February 1973, soon after the country’s independence in 1971. In 2005, the embassy moved to its current address at 2 Boulevard de la Tour-Maubourg, which previously served as the headquarters of the Rally for the Republic party.

== Ambassadors ==
The current ambassador, His Excellency Fahad Saeed Al Raqbani, presented his credentials to President Emmanuel Macron on 17 September 2024. Prior to his appointment in France, Ambassador Al Raqbani served as the UAE ambassador to Canada from 2018.

Notably, the embassy has also been led by Her Excellency Hend Al Otaiba, the UAE's first female ambassador to France.

== See also ==
- Foreign relations of the United Arab Emirates
- Foreign relations of France
- List of diplomatic missions of the United Arab Emirates
- List of diplomatic missions in France
