= Rangel Municipality, Mérida =

Rangel Municipality Municipio Rangel
- Municipality
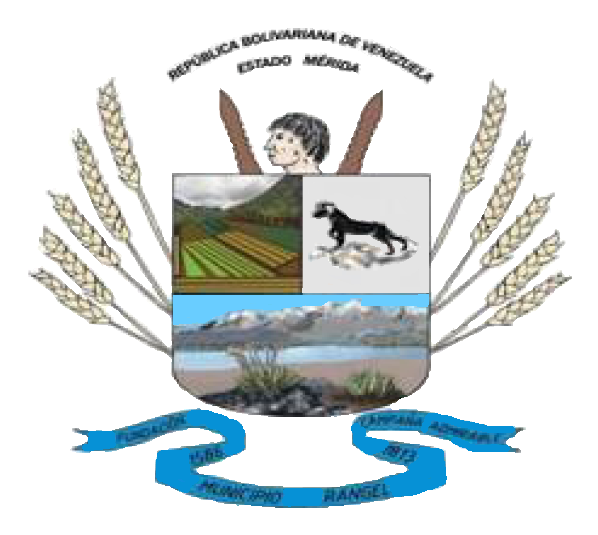
- Flag Coat of arms

- Location in Mérida

- Location in Venezuela
- Coordinates: 8°45′N 70°55′W
- Country: Venezuela
- State: Mérida

Government
  - Mayor: Elsy Trejo (PSUV)
- Time zone: UTC−4 (VET)

Rangel is one of the 23 municipalities (municipios) of the Venezuelan state of Mérida. Its capital is the town of Mucuchíes. It has four parishes: Cacute, La Toma, Mucurubá, and San Rafael. The municipality is named after the national hero Colonel José Antonio Rangel (1788–1821), who played a prominent role in the Venezuelan War of Independence.
