= Tanztheater =

Theatrical genre

Tanztheater (German: [ˈtant͡steˌʔaːtɐ]; "Dance theatre") is a type of contemporary dance performance, primarily associated with Pina Bausch and her Tanztheater Wuppertal. In place of formal choreography, Bausch's tanztheater works tend to meld dance and everyday movements within theatrically sophisticated settings to offer enigmatic presentations of living human issues.

The term tanztheater appears to have been coined by Rudolf Laban by 1924. The concept seems to have emerged as a by-product of German expressionist dance in Weimar Germany and 1920s Vienna, before succumbing to the Nazi regime. A fresh approach to tanztheater took hold from the 1970s onwards, especially through the innovative work of Bausch and choreographers associated with her, including Reinhild Hoffmann and Susanne Linke.

== History ==
The term tanztheater appears to have been coined by Rudolf Laban after 1920. Laban's concept of tanztheater can be seen to have emerged from the German expressionist dance (ausdruckstanz) of the time, and ultimately can be traced back to the free dance movement practices explored at the summer school events he held at Monte Verità beside Lake Maggiore in Ascona, Switzerland, between 1913 and 1917. In an article published in 1924, Laban described tanztheater as a new art form focused on movement that aims to find "a synthesis of all possibilities of expression", whether as a dance tragedy, ballad, comedy, or "movement symphony." Alongside Laban, the main exponents of tanztheater in the 1920s included Mary Wigman and Kurt Jooss.

In its more current usage, the term tanztheater re-emerged in the context of the work of Pina Bausch in particular, and other like-minded choreographers. Following the student movements of the 1960s, increasing frustration among younger dancers with the dominance of ballet (opernballett) in West German dance had led to a revival of the tanztheater concept among rebellious choreographers such as the free-dance exponent Gerhard Bohner and the Austrian Johann Kresnik, (Note: To distinguish his approach from that of Bausch's tanztheater, in 1973 Kresnik coined the term choreographic theatre. He had become the director of dance theatre in Bremen (Tanztheater Bremer) in the 1968–1969 season.) whose politically provocative revue productions were intended to challenge the world-view of his more traditionalist audiences. On being invited to take charge of the dance company at Wuppertal in 1973, Bausch symbolically (Note: See Meyer, p. 29, where Bausch is quoted as saying, "From very early on, I wanted to make it clear... Before me, there had been the Wuppertal Ballet, and ballet is tied into classical dance. The term 'dance theatre' is very comprehensive but is not necessarily connected to classical ballet. That was very important to me.") renamed the city's ballet theatre as Tanztheater Wuppertal. By the 1980s, tanztheater was frequently being discussed in critical reviews of works by German choreographers who were students of Jooss (such as Bausch and Reinhild Hoffmann) and Wigman (Susanne Linke). The development of the form and its concepts was influenced by Bertolt Brecht and Max Reinhardt, and the cultural ferment of the Weimar Republic.

The Tanztheater Wuppertal Pina Bausch, as the company came to be known, rapidly gained an international reputation, and Bausch's dramaturge, Raimund Hoghe, created independent productions from 1989.

== Form ==
Tanztheater developed out of German expressionist dance, known as Ausdruckstanz. As the Nazi regime diminished artistic vigor in Germany, Ausdruckstanz fell dormant. Both Birringer (1986) and Schlicher (1987) argue that the particular artistic and historical context of post-war Germany informed the genesis of Tanztheater. In the post war years, Tanztheater became more than a mere ‘blend’ of dance and dramatic elements. Tanztheater prioritized expression over form, viewing dance as a method of social engagement.

== Notes, references and sources ==
=== Sources ===
- Bradley, Karen K. (2008). Rudolf Laban. Routledge. ISBN 978-1-134-18742-3.
- Climenhaga, Royd (2008). Pina Bausch. Routledge. ISBN 978-1-134-18757-7.
- Meyer, Marion (30 March 2017). Pina Bausch: The Biography. Bloomsbury Publishing. ISBN 978-1-78319-990-7.
- Weir, Lucy (2018). Pina Bausch's Dance Theatre: Tracing the Evolution of Tanztheater. Edinburgh University Press. ISBN 978-1-4744-3684-7.
