= Mana Al Otaiba =

Emirati politician and writer (born 1946)

- مانع العتيبة
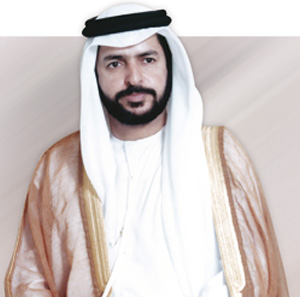
- Al Otaiba in 1997

14th Secretary General of OPEC (as President of OPEC)
- In office 19 July 1983 – 31 December 1983
- Preceded by: Marc Saturnin Nan Nguema
- Succeeded by: Kamel Hassan Maghur

Personal details
- Born: 15 May 1946 (age 80) Abu Dhabi, Trucial States
- Relations: Yousef Al Otaiba (son), Hend Al Otaiba (daughter)
- Occupation: Politician, economist, businessman, poet, novelist

Mana Saeed Al Otaiba Al Marar (Arabic: مانع سعيد العتيبة المرر; born 15 May 1946) in Abu Dhabi, Trucial States, son of Saeed Al Otaiba, is the former Minister of Petroleum and Mineral Resources of the United Arab Emirates under the presidency of Sheikh Zayed bin Sultan Al Nahyan. Al Otaiba then became his Personal Adviser until the president's death, after which he became the Private Advisor to Sheikh Khalifa bin Zayed Al Nahyan, as well as a member of the Royal Moroccan Academy under King Hassan II.

== Biography ==
Mana Al Otaiba served as President of OPEC six times, for its 26th, 52nd, 53rd, 54th, 62nd and 63rd conferences, held during 1971–1983.

Al Otaiba is the former chair of Noor Capital, a firm dealing in asset management, private equity, investment banking, investment placement and direct equity. He is also a major shareholder in Abu Dhabi Group, a company with holdings in real estate, banking, Islamic banking, telecommunication, ISP, manufacturing, pharmaceuticals, hotels and tourism, as well as being a major shareholder in Etisalat. Al Otaiba is the owner of the Royal Mirage Hotels in Morocco (formerly part of Sheraton Hotels and Resorts), The Royal Mirage Marrakech Deluxe, the Royal Mirage Fes, and the Royal Mirage Agadir.

Al Otaiba has published more than 135 poetry books, written in colloquial Arabic, formal Arabic, and English. His writing was renowned even before the unification of the Emirates in 1972. Al Otaiba has written novels (including Karima, which became the basis for a television series) and several non-fiction books including Essays on Petroleum, The Petroleum Concession Agreements, and OPEC and the Petroleum Industry. He has been awarded several honorary doctorates, including a Doctorate of Law from Keio University in Japan, a Doctorate of Law from the University of Manila in the Philippines, and a Doctorate of Economics from the University of São Paulo in Brazil.

== Books ==
- Al-Otaiba, Mana Saeed (1971). The Economy of Abu Dhabi, Ancient and Modern. Beirut, Commercial and Industrial Press.
- Al-Otaiba, Mana Saeed. The Planning Council in the Emirate of Abu Dhabi.
- Al-Otaiba, Mana Saeed. The OPEC Organisation.
- Al-Otaiba, Mana Saeed (1975). OPEC and the Petroleum Industry. Croom Helm. ISBN 978-0856642623.
- Al-Otaiba, Mana Saeed (1977). Petroleum and the Economy of the United Arab Emirates. Croom Helm. ISBN 978-0856645198.
- Al-Otaiba, Mana Saeed (1982). The Petroleum Concession Agreements of the United Arab Emirates. Routledge Kegan & Paul. ISBN 978-0709919155.
- Al-Otaiba, Mana Saeed (1982). Essays on Petroleum. Routledge Kegan & Paul. ISBN 978-0709919216.
- Al-Otaiba, Mana Saeed. Arabisation and Globalisation.
- Al-Otaiba, Mana Saeed (2008). Dialogue of Civilizations: The Self and the Other. Red Sea Press, U.S. ISBN 978-1569022948.
- Al-Otaiba, Mana Saeed. Towards a New System of Arabism.
- Al-Otaiba, Mana Saeed. Education and Development of the World of Arabism.
- Al-Otaiba, Mana Saeed. Arabism in Arabic Poetry.
- Al-Otaiba, Mana Saeed. From the Springs of Arabic Poetry.
- Al-Otaiba, Mana Saeed. The Flavour of Arabic Prose.
- Al-Otaiba, Mana Saeed. I and Poetry.
- Al-Otaiba, Mana Saeed. Karima.
- Al-Otaiba, Mana Saeed. Night Visitor.

== See also ==
- List of Arabic language poets
