= Hend Al Otaiba =

Former Emirati ambassador to France

UAE Ambassador to France
- In office August 2021 – September 2024
- President: Mohammed bin Zayed Al Nahyan
- Preceded by: Ali Al-Ahmad
- Succeeded by: Fahad Saeed Al Raqbani

Personal details
- Spouse: Sheikh Salem Al Qassimi
- Relations: Yousef Al Otaiba (brother)
- Children: 2
- Parent: Mana Al Otaiba

Hend Mana Saeed Al Otaiba is an Emirati government official who served as the ambassador of the United Arab Emirates to France from 2019 to 2024.

== Early life ==
Al Otaiba obtained her undergraduate degree in London, where she studied psychology. She later received a master's degree in marketing, management and communications from the Paris Sorbonne Abu Dhabi in 2011 and also holds a master's degree in security studies from the UAE National Defense College. She is a board member of the Anwar Gargash Diplomatic Academy.

== Career ==
From 2012 and 2017, Al Otaiba was the Director of Strategic Communications at the state-run media organization Abu Dhabi Media. Her first appointment was in the Tourism Development and Investment Company (TDIC), where she worked in communications from 2008 to 2012. During her time at the TDIC she oversaw cultural programmes and also worked with the French on the Louvre Abu Dhabi.

In 2019, she was appointed as the first director of the strategic communications department at the UAE Ministry of Foreign Affairs and International Cooperation. She also served as the Foreign Ministry's spokesperson. She joined the UAE's foreign ministry in April 2017 as an advisor to Sheikh Abdullah bin Zayed Al Nahyan, the Minister of Foreign Affairs and Co-operation of the UAE.

Al Otaiba was appointed as UAE’s ambassador to France in July 2021. She was succeeded in France by Fahad Saeed Al Raqbani, who was previously the UAE Ambassador to Canada.

== Personal life ==
Al Otaiba is married to Sheikh Salem Al Qassimi current ambassador of the UAE to UNESCO and they have two sons. She's a fluent speaker of French. Her father, Mana Al Otaiba, is the former UAE minister of petroleum and mineral resources and her brother, Yousef Al Otaiba, is the current ambassador of the UAE in the United States.
