= Campo Elías Municipality =

Campo Elías Municipality Municipio Campo Elías
- Municipality
- Flag Coat of arms

- Location in Mérida

- Location in Venezuela
- Coordinates: 8°27′00″N 71°17′00″W
- Country: Venezuela
- State: Mérida
- Municipal seat: Ejido

Government
  - Mayor: Jesús Rodríguez

Area
  - Total: 609 km^{2} (235 sq mi)

Population (2007)
  - Total: 100,192
  - Density: 165/km^{2} (426/sq mi)
- Time zone: UTC−4 (VET)
- Area code(s): 0274
- Website: Official website

The Campo Elías Municipality is one of the 23 municipalities (municipios) that makes up the Venezuelan state of Mérida and according to a 2007 population estimate by the National Institute of Statistics of Venezuela, the municipality has a population of 100,192. The town of Ejido is the shire town of the Campo Elías Municipality.

== Demographics ==
The Campo Elías Municipality, according to a 2007 population estimate by the National Institute of Statistics of Venezuela, has a population of 100,192 (up from 84,476 in 2000). This amounts to 11.9% of the state's population. The municipality's population density is 164.5 inhabitants per square kilometre (426/sq mi).

== Government ==
The mayor of the Campo Elías Municipality is Jesús Alberto Rodríguez Velázquez (Toto), elected on July 27, 2025 with 87% of the vote. The municipality is divided into seven parishes; Fernández Peña, Matriz, Montalbán, Acequias, Jají, La Mesa, and San José del Sur.
