= Subroto (politician) =

Indonesian politician (1923–2022)

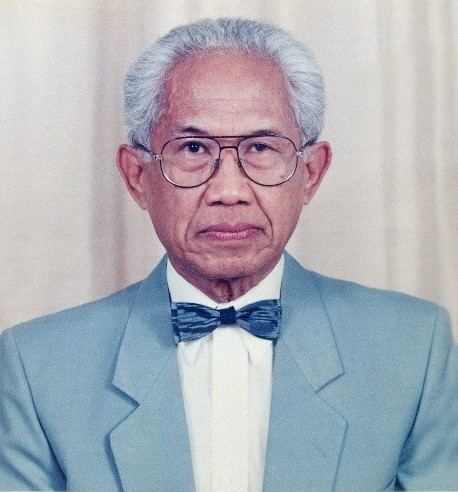

16th and 19th Secretary General of OPEC
- In office 1 July 1988 – 30 June 1994
- Preceded by: Rilwanu Lukman
- Succeeded by: Abdallah Salem el-Badri
- In office 31 October 1984 – 9 December 1985 as President of OPEC
- Preceded by: Kamel Hassan Maghur
- Succeeded by: Arturo Hernández Grisanti

Personal details
- Born: 19 September 1923 Surakarta, Central Java, Dutch East Indies
- Died: 20 December 2022 (aged 99) Jakarta, Indonesia

Subroto (19 September 1923 – 20 December 2022) was an Indonesian administrator and economist. He was a doctoral graduate and faculty member of University of Indonesia between 1956 and 1963, Minister of Energy and Natural Resources between 1978 and 1988, and Secretary General of OPEC between 1988 and 1994. Subroto died on 20 December 2022, at the age of 99.

== See also ==
- Politics of Indonesia
