= Jají, Venezuela =

San Miguel de Jají
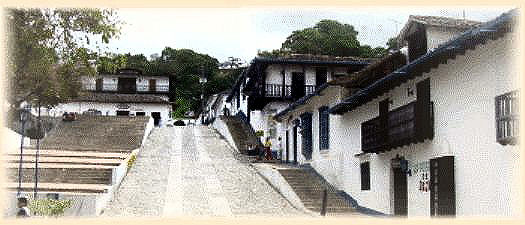

- Location within Venezuela
- Coordinates: 8°34′16″N 71°20′41″W
- Country: Venezuela
- States: Mérida
- Municipalities: Campo Elías Municipality
- Elevation: 1,781 m (5,843 ft)
- Time zone: UTC-4:30
- Climate: Cfb

Jají is a community in the Campo Elías Municipality of Mérida state in Venezuela, in the foothills of the Cordillera Oriental, at an altitude of 1781 m. It is 34 kilometers from the city of Mérida.

The town was founded in 1580 by Bartolomé Gil Naranjo with the name San Pedro de Jají. García Varela refounded the town in 1610 with the name of San Miguel de Jají.

It is now a planned village, restored in the twentieth century in Spanish Colonial style, and a major tourist destination. It has guest houses, a museum and a colonial-style church. Jají opened in 1971 after its reconstruction was started in 1968. The restoration salvaged the facades and retained doors, windows and original bars more than 400 years old.

== Pictures ==
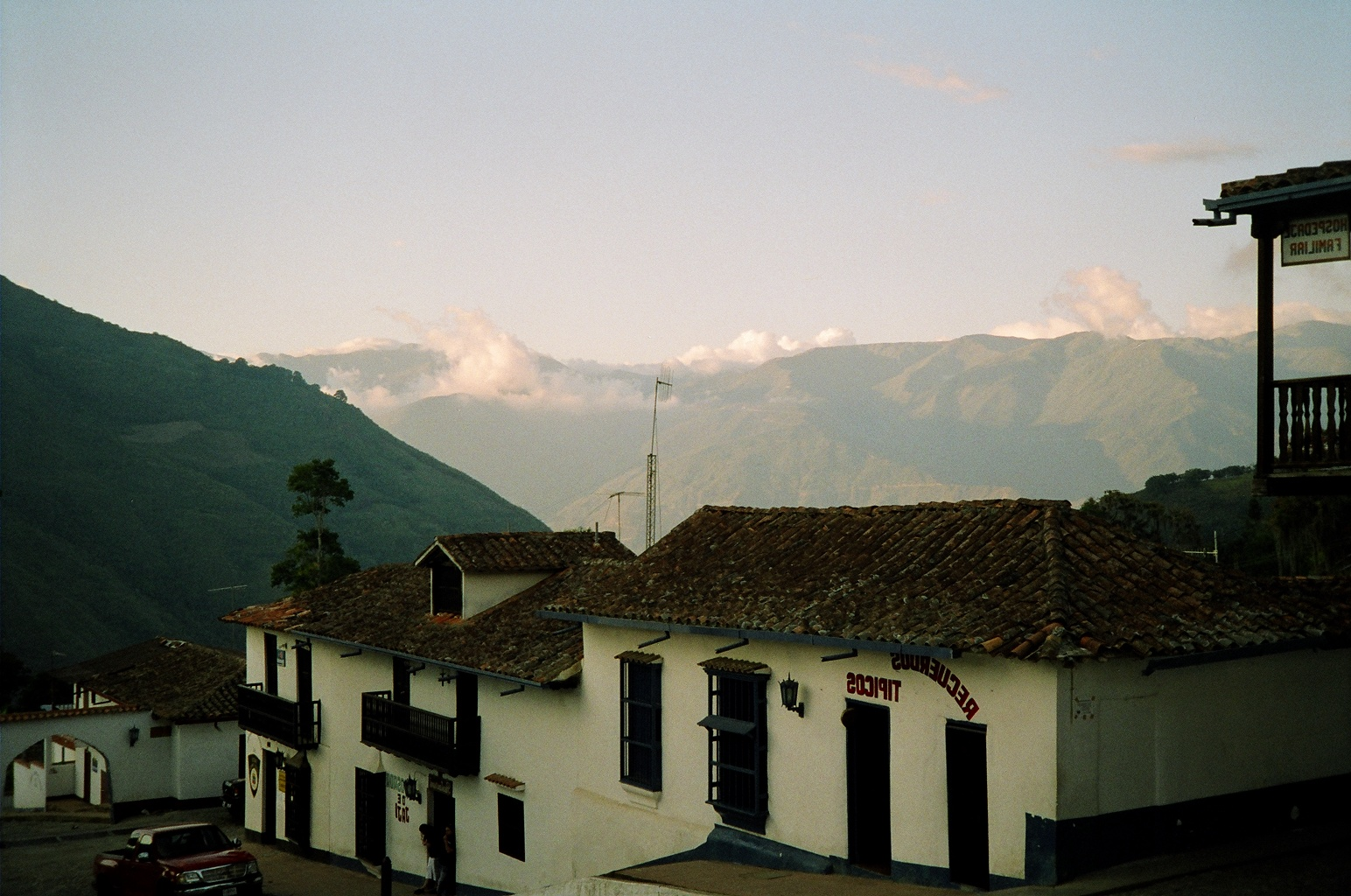
Jají Plaza Bolivar

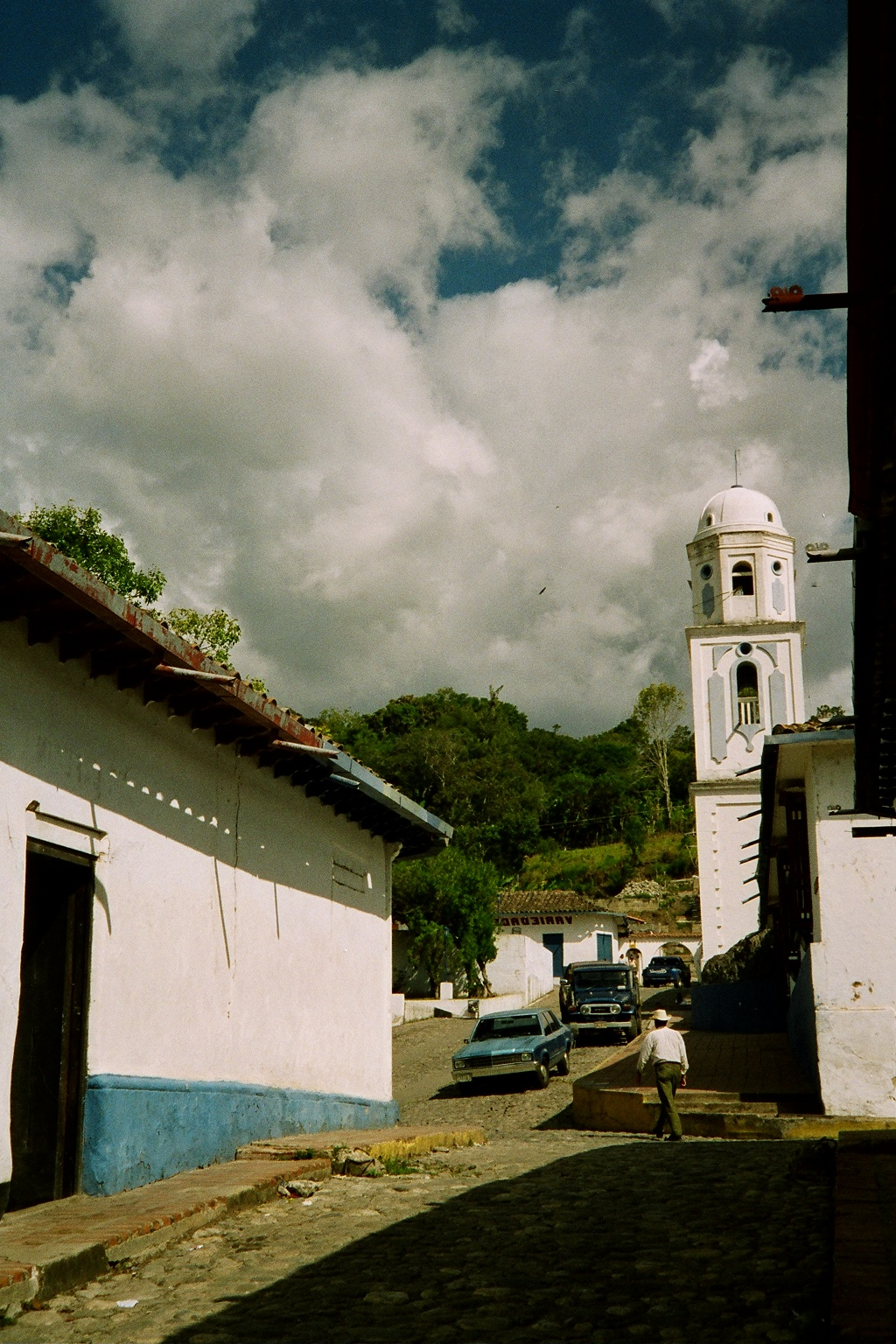
Jají Church

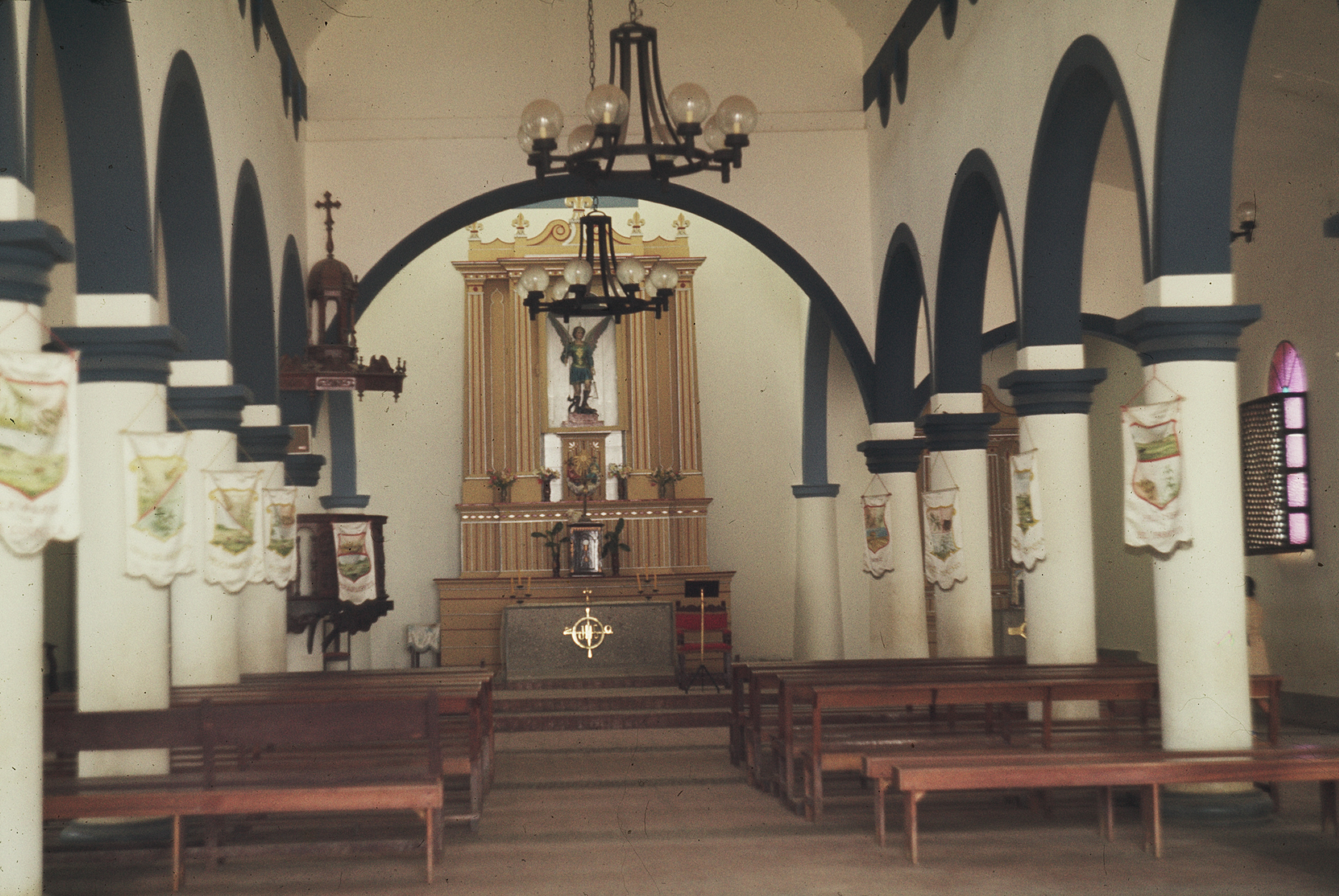
Jají Church interior

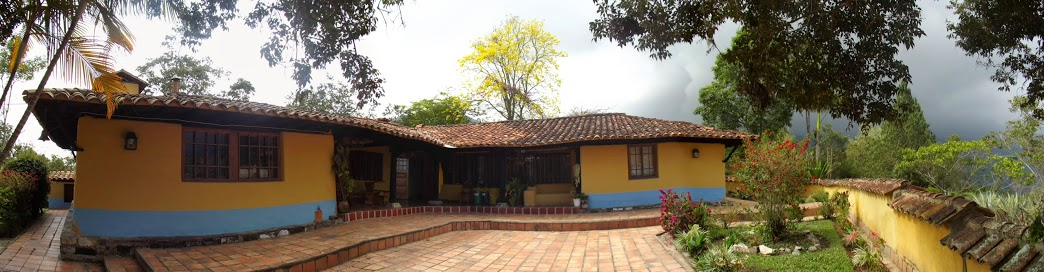
Farm el Tucuche, Knoll de Los Guamos
