= Abdallah Salem el-Badri =

Libyan chairman

- عبد الله سالم البدري
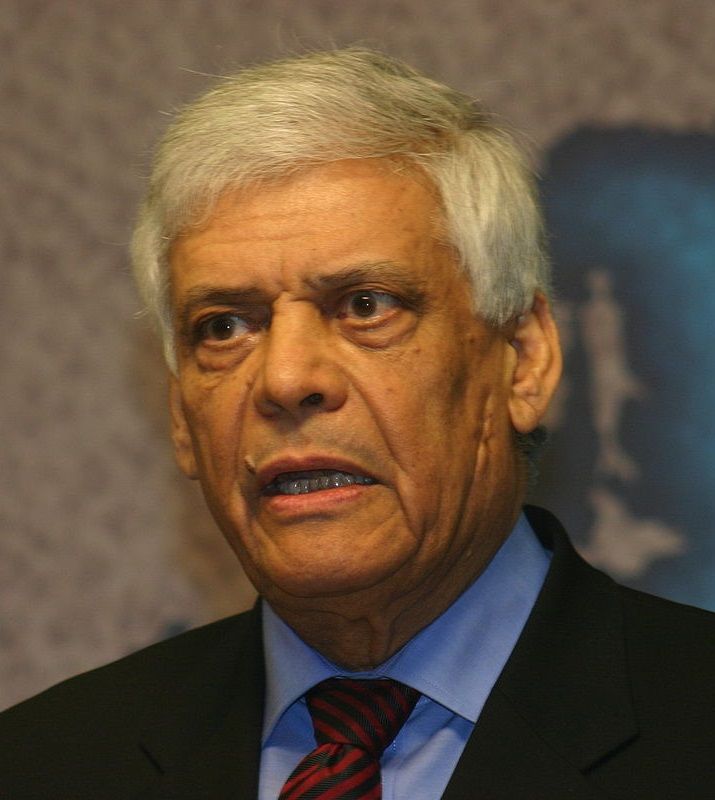
- El-Badri in 2010

20th and 27th Secretary General of OPEC
- In office 1 January 2007 – 31 July 2016
- Preceded by: Edmund Daukoru
- Succeeded by: Mohammed Barkindo
- In office 1 July 1994 – 31 December 1994
- Preceded by: Subroto
- Succeeded by: Rilwanu Lukman

Personal details
- Born: 25 May 1940 (age 86) Ghemines, Italian Libya
- Education: Florida Southern College

Abdalla Salem el-Badri (born 25 May 1940) is a former Libyan official who served as Chairman of the National Oil Corporation (NOC), Minister of Petroleum, Minister of Energy, Minister of Management, and Deputy Prime Minister. He was also the longest-serving Secretary General of OPEC, holding the position in 1994 and then 2007–2016, a total of 10 years and 1 month. He is a citizen of Libya and resides in Austria. He is married with five children.

OPEC selected Nigeria's Mohammed Barkindo to succeed el-Badri as Secretary General, effective 1 August 2016. One of their predecessors was Omar el-Badri who held the position in 1970, although OPEC does not disclose any relation between its two Libyan Secretaries General with the same family name.

Abdalla El-Badri was born in Ghemines, Libya, and began his oil industry career in 1965 with Esso. He graduated cum laude from Florida Southern College in 1975 with a B.S. in accounting. He served as the Libyan Minister for Oil from 1990, the post being expanded to cover electricity in 1993. In 2000, he moved to become Under-Secretary for Services, then in 2002 he became Deputy Prime Minister. From 2002 to 2004, he served as Minister for Management.
