= Fuad Rouhani =

Iranian diplomat (1907–2004)

- فؤاد روحانی
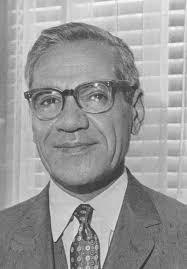

1st Secretary General of OPEC
- In office 21 January 1961 – 30 April 1964
- Preceded by: Office created
- Succeeded by: Abdul Rahman al-Bazzaz

Personal details
- Born: 23 October 1907 Tehran, Iran
- Died: 30 January 2004 (aged 96) London, England
- Party: Independent
- Education: University of London

Fuad Rouhani (23 October 1907 – 30 January 2004) (Persian: فؤاد روحانی) was an Iranian administrator and translator. He served as the first Secretary-General of OPEC between 21 January 1961 and 30 April 1964. He is the only Iranian to hold this office from OPEC's establishment to date.

== Biography ==
Fuad Rouhani was born in Tehran on 23 October 1907. Rouhani completed his early education in Tehran, and went to work in the oil industry, then under British control.

Rouhani, educated as a lawyer, was born in Iran and trained in London and Paris. Rouhani worked in a company which discovered first and produced oil in the country, the Anglo-Iranian Oil Company, which later became BP. He advised the Iranian government on its nationalization of the company in 1951, and later advised Shah Mohammed Reza Pahlavi on oil matters.

He earned two law degrees from the University of London in 1937. A quarter-century later, in the middle of a career in public service, he entered the University of Paris, receiving a doctorate in law in 1968.

He went on to advise the Shah from 1965 to 1968, he was secretary general of the Regional Cooperation for Development organization, which worked to foster economic integration among Iran, Pakistan and Turkey. In 1968 he entered the university of Paris where he was awarded a doctorate in law.

Rouhani, though not religious himself, found time to write A Guide to the Contents of the Koran, as well as other books on religion. He also translated into Persian works by Plato and C.G.Jung, among others.

== OPEC career ==
When OPEC set up its office in Geneva in 1961 before moving to Vienna Rouhani was elected the organization's first secretary general, an administrative post that also involved mediating between conflicting factions. He served for three years, the only Iranian to do so. Currently, Iran is demanding that an Iranian be chosen to fill the current opening.

OPEC's success has long been a matter of debate, with many analysts saying that the marketplace and the willingness of one country, Saudi Arabia, to limit output have been the deciding factors in determining oil prices. The oil embargo of 1973 was initiated just by the Arab producers, not OPEC as a whole.

In 1964 Rouhani was succeeded by an Iraqi, Abd ar-Rahman al-Bazzaz, who encouraged talk of both radical politics and Islamic religion.

== Personal life ==
Rouhani played the tar, a traditional Persian musical instrument, and was an accomplished pianist and co-founder of the Philharmonic Society of Tehran.

Rouhani was married for 76 years to Rohan, and together they had two daughters, Guitty Hosseinpour and Negar Diba. Negar Diba is married to Kamran Diba, the architect and first cousin to Empress Farah Pahlavi. Guitty Hosseinpour's son, Amir Hosseinpour is an international opera director and choreographer of note. After the Iranian revolution of 1979, when Rouhani's house and possessions were confiscated, he moved to Geneva, and later to London where he died aged 96.

== Bibliography ==
- History of OPEC
- The Republic by Plato (as translator)
- Psychology and religion by Carl Jung (as translator)
- Farīd al-Dīn ʻAṭṭār (1960). The 'Ilāhī-nāma [Book of God]. Translated by Fuʾād Rūḥānī. Tehran, Iran. The 'Ilāhī-nāma is a 12th century Persian poem. In 1960, Rouhani's translation of this book into French was published.

Diplomatic posts
Preceded by Office Created	Secretary General of OPEC; 1961–1964	Succeeded by Abdul Rahman al-Bazzaz
