= Marc Saturnin Nan Nguéma =

13th Secretary General of OPEC
- In office 1 July 1981 – 30 June 1983
- Preceded by: René G. Ortiz
- Succeeded by: Mana Al Otaiba

Personal details
- Born: 13 March 1934
- Died: 7 November 2012 (aged 78)

Marc Saturnin Nan Nguéma (13 April 1934 – 7 November 2012) was a Gabonese economist and politician. He was the secretary-general of the Organization of the Petroleum Exporting Countries (OPEC) from 1981 to 1983 and was an opposition politician in Gabon from 1990 till his death.

He was the father of writer Bessora.

== Career as an economist and diplomat ==
A member of the Fang ethnic group, born in Lambaréné, Nan Nguéma studied in Paris and obtained a Ph.D. in economics; he also received degrees in political science and business and public administration. He entered the civil service in Paris in 1960, and after returning to Gabon he became director of the Economic Affairs Department in 1963. Subsequently, he worked at the United Nations; he was appointed as an economic affairs officer at the UN's Department of Economic and Social Affairs in 1964, and he was moved to a post at the United Nations Conference on Trade and Development in 1965. Later, in 1968, Nan Nguéma was appointed as Gabon's permanent representative to the United Nations Office at Geneva, and he began working as an executive at the French oil company Elf Aquitaine in November 1970.

Nan Nguéma was adviser to the executive director of the International Monetary Fund from 1972 to 1975. Subsequently, he was Gabon's representative to the OPEC Executive Commission Board from 1975 to 1976 and deputy director-General of the Elf Gabon oil company from 1976 to 1981.

Nan Nguéma served as Secretary-General of OPEC from 1 July 1981 to 30 June 1983. He also worked as the deputy director-general of Elf Gabon prior to 1990 and was an adviser to Gabonese President Omar Bongo until 1990.

== Political career ==
Amidst the wave of democratization that swept Africa beginning in 1990, Nan Nguéma joined the Gabonese opposition and became vice-president of the Gabonese Progress Party (PGP) when it was founded in March 1990. He subsequently left the PGP to found the Liberal Democratic Party (PLD) in mid-1992. In late September 1993, he announced that he would stand as a candidate in the December 1993 presidential election. In the election, he officially placed 10th with 0.86% of the vote. Nan Nguéma was subsequently the President of the Congress for Democracy and Justice (CDJ) until 2000, when the party was restructured at its Second Ordinary Congress and Jules-Aristide Bourdes-Ogouliguende assumed the leadership as its Secretary-General.

Nan Nguéma was arrested on 29 November 2004 for illegal arms possession after assault rifles were allegedly found buried at his property in Port-Gentil. According to Nan Nguéma and his lawyer, the weapons were legally obtained for protection during the turbulent political struggle of the early 1990s and he had no intent to use them aggressively. Bourdes-Ogouliguende denounced the arrest and alleged that it was part of an attempt to brand the CDJ as a terrorist organization.

Preceded by René G. Ortiz	Secretary General of OPEC; 1 July 1981 – 30 June 1983	Succeeded by Fadhil J. al-Chalabi
