= Mucuchíes =

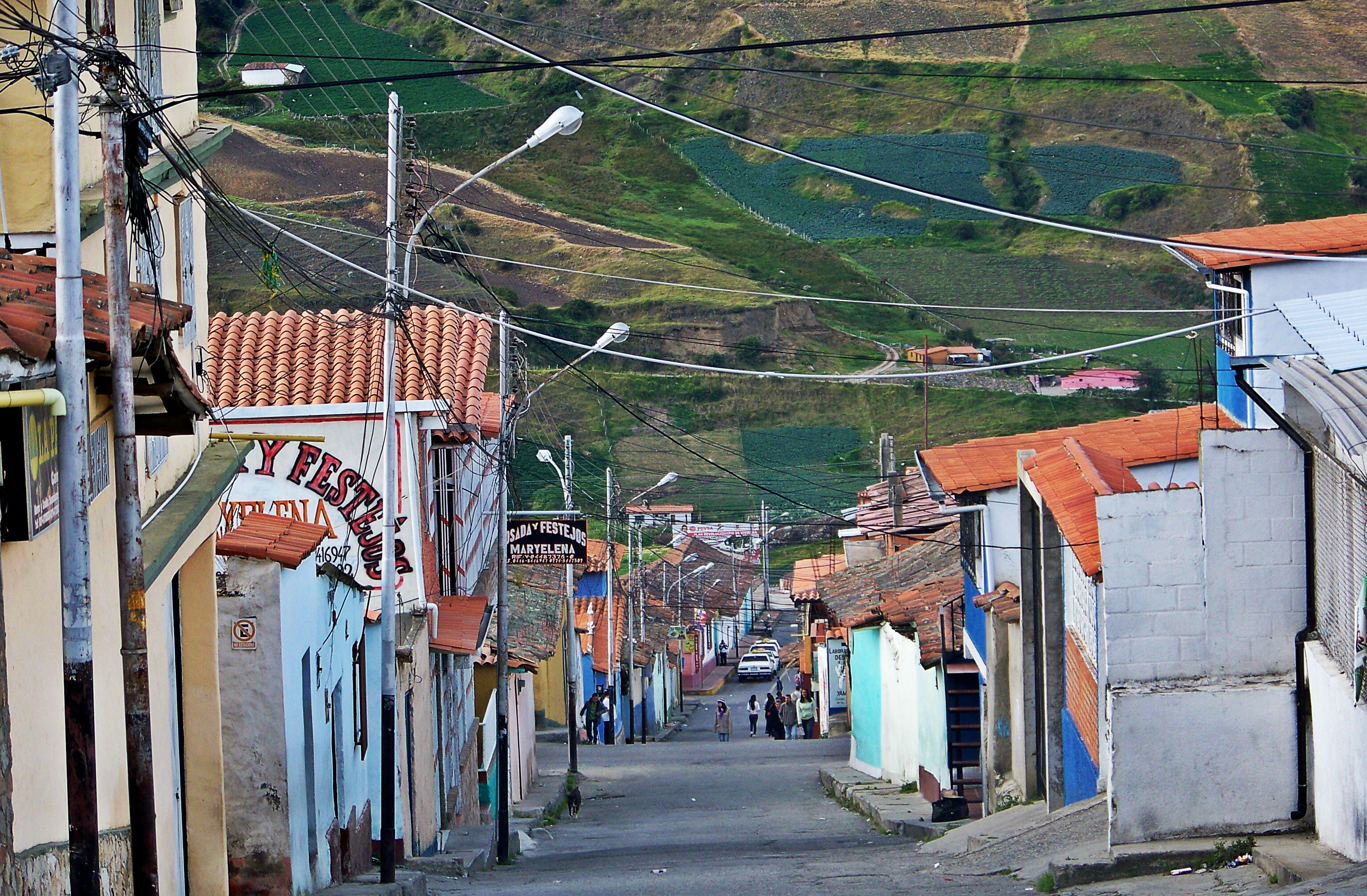

- Location within Venezuela
- Coordinates: 8°45′00″N 70°55′00″W
- Country: Venezuela
- States: Mérida
- Municipalities: Rangel Municipality
- Demonym: Mucuchicero
- Elevation: 2,983 m (9,787 ft)

Population (2011)
  - Total: 6,354
- Time zone: UTC-4:30
- Postal Code: 5130
- Area code: +58 274
- Climate: Cfb

Mucuchíes is a town in the Rangel Municipality of Mérida State, Venezuela. It is at an altitude of 2,983 meters and has a cool climate, with an average temperature of 11 °C. The town was founded by Bartolomé Gil Naranjo in 1586.

== Festivals ==
Patron saint festivities are held during the month of December, with their patron saints St. Lucia and St. Benedict the Moor.

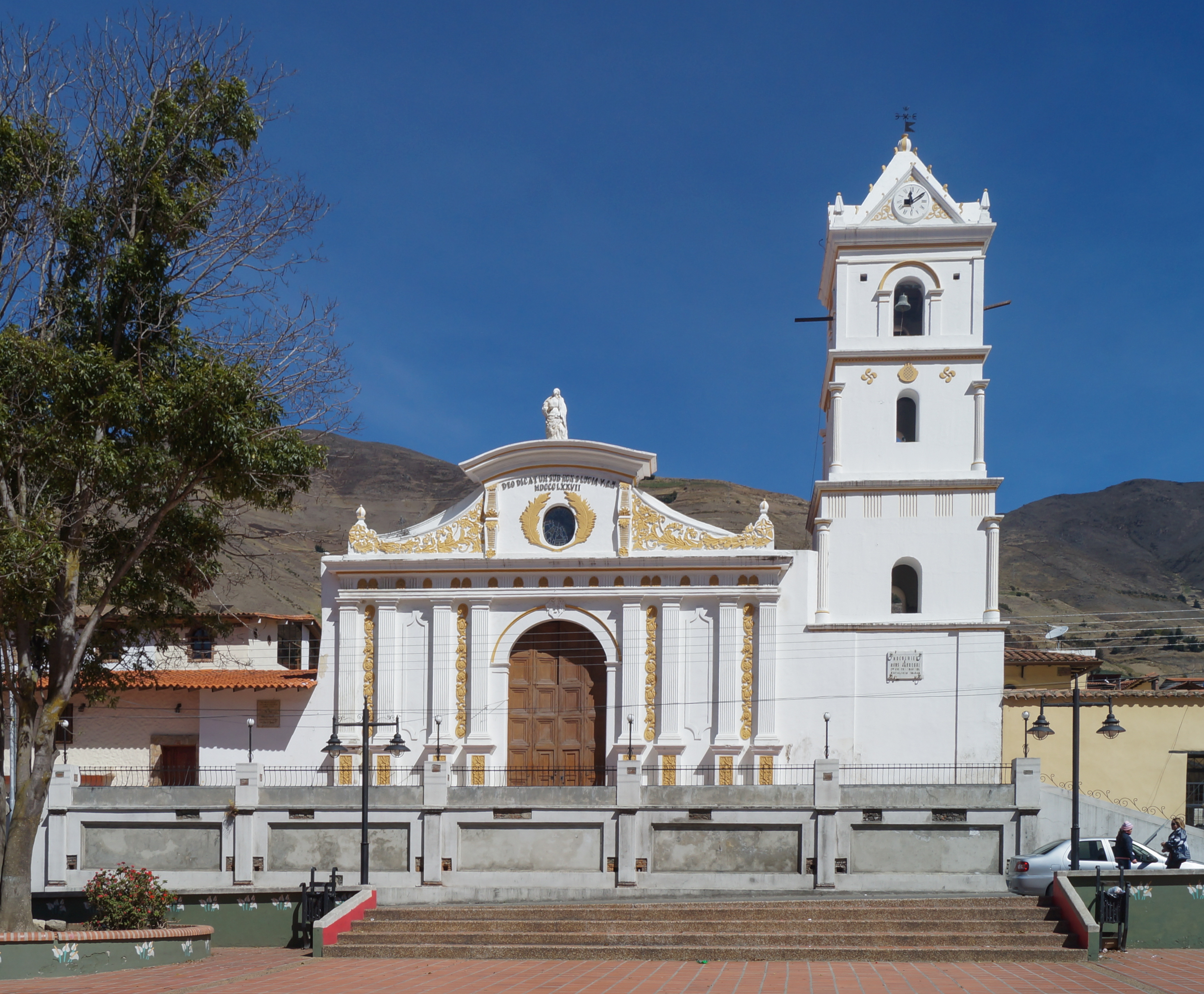
Santa Lucia Mucuches Church (Iglesia de Santa Lucía de Mucuchíes)

== Geography ==
=== Climate ===
Köppen-Geiger climate classification system classifies its climate as subtropical highland (Cfb), while bordering on páramo climate (ET). This is primarily influenced by its surrounding altitudes, which maintain average temperatures consistently below 10°C throughout the year. This combination of factors creates a distinctive climatic environment that blends subtropical characteristics with the colder conditions typically associated with alpine regions.

Climate data for Mucuchíes, Mérida, Venezuela
Month	Jan	Feb	Mar	Apr	May	Jun	Jul	Aug	Sep	Oct	Nov	Dec	Year
Mean daily maximum °C (°F)	18 (64)	18.5 (65.3)	18.1 (64.6)	17.5 (63.5)	17.3 (63.1)	16.7 (62.1)	16.6 (61.9)	17.1 (62.8)	17.4 (63.3)	17.2 (63.0)	17.3 (63.1)	18 (64)	17.5 (63.4)
Daily mean °C (°F)	10.7 (51.3)	11.4 (52.5)	11.6 (52.9)	11.8 (53.2)	12.1 (53.8)	11.9 (53.4)	11.6 (52.9)	11.8 (53.2)	11.9 (53.4)	11.8 (53.2)	11.4 (52.5)	11.1 (52.0)	11.6 (52.9)
Mean daily minimum °C (°F)	3.5 (38.3)	4.3 (39.7)	5.2 (41.4)	6.2 (43.2)	7 (45)	7.1 (44.8)	6.6 (43.9)	6.5 (43.7)	6.4 (43.5)	6.4 (43.5)	5.5 (41.9)	4.3 (39.7)	5.7 (42.4)
Average precipitation mm (inches)	14 (0.6)	13 (0.5)	24 (0.9)	103 (4.1)	117 (4.6)	98 (3.9)	89 (3.5)	92 (3.6)	88 (3.5)	103 (4.1)	64 (2.5)	18 (0.7)	823 (32.5)
Average rainy days	6	6	9	17	18	18	18	20	19	18	13	10	172
Mean daily sunshine hours	8	7	6	5	4	4	5	5	5	5	5	7	6
Source 1: Climate-Data.org (altitude: 2899m)
Source 2: Weather2Travel (rainy days, sun)
