= Mucurubá =

- Location within Venezuela
- Coordinates: 8°42′28″N 70°59′30″W
- Country: Venezuela
- States: Mérida
- Municipalities: Rangel Municipality
- Elevation: 2,407 m (7,897 ft)

Population
  - Total: 4,700
- Time zone: UTC-4:30
- Climate: Cfb

Mucurubá is a community in Mérida state, Venezuela, in the foothills of the Cordillera Oriental. It is 2,407 m above sea level, about 32 kilometers from the city of Mérida. It is a parish within the Rangel Municipality. The name is derived from the words "muco" (place) and "ruba" (a tuber similar to potato) in the language spoken by the pre-Columbian inhabitants. The settlement was found in 1586 by Bartolomé Gil Naranjo.

The climate is cool and dry, with an average temperature of 16.5 °C, suitable for irrigated farming of crops such as potato, carrot, lettuce, garlic, blackberries, strawberries, peaches and figs. In colonial times, corn was an important crop, ground in water mills.
