= Bartolomé Gil Naranjo =

Don Bartolomé Gil Naranjo was a Spanish judge who founded several settlements in the province of Mérida in what is today Venezuela in the late 16th century. His purpose was to gather the indigenous people in villages under Spanish control in part to facilitate religious indoctrination, in part to control the workforce in cultivating the appropriated lands. Gil Naranjo chose the site of the town in a level area and marked the site of the main plaza and the church, which he named after a saint. He also chose the location of the school, the street plan and the location of other plazas, in some of which the tree of justice or pillory was placed. An early source records that Gil Naranjo founded thirty three such villages, each dedicated to a particular saint.

Bartolomé Gil Naranjo founded Jají in 1580 with the name San Pedro de Jají. He established the first foundation at Mucurubá on 25 March 1586, a school hosted by the Augustinian friars. He also established Mucuchíes in the same year. Tabay, founded by Gil Naranjo in 1589, became the residence of landowners who years later turned this town into one of the largest producers of coffee in the country.
