= Reinhild Hoffmann =

German choreographer and dancer (born 1943)

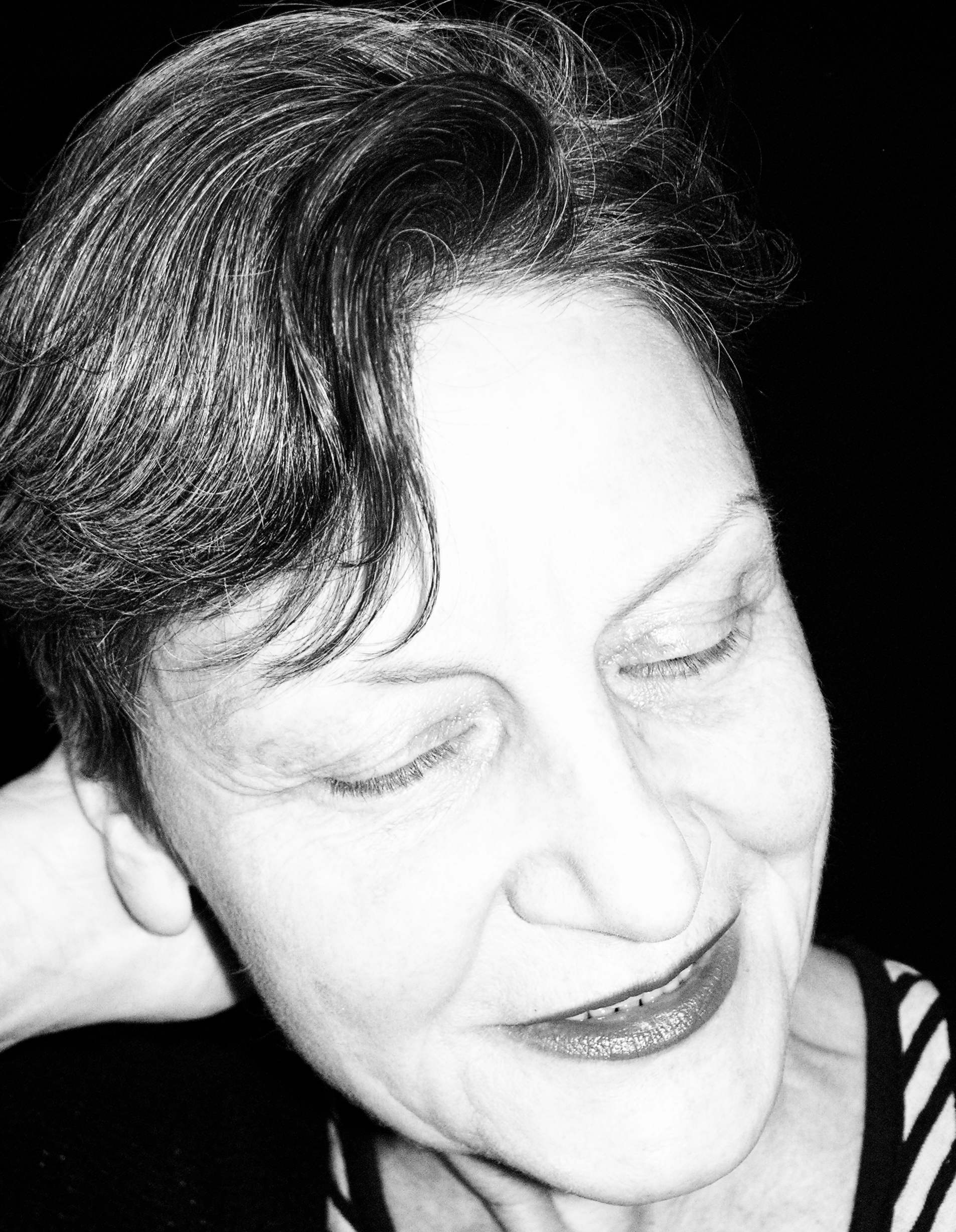
Reinhild Hoffmann

Reinhild Hoffmann (born 1 November 1943 in Sorau) is a German choreographer and dancer who is an important innovator in Tanztheater, along with Pina Bausch and Susanne Linke.

== Early years ==
Reinhild Hoffmann moved to southern Germany as a child and studied ballet at a school in Karlsruhe. From 1965 to 1970, she studied contemporary dance at the Folkwang School in Essen with Susanne Linke and Pina Bausch and graduated with a degree in dance education. Hoffmann, Linke, and Bausch are often credited as the three chief founders of the contemporary hybrid form known as Tanztheater in Germany (where it originated) and dance theater in English-speaking countries. Hoffmann demonstrates a concern for the female perspective in her work, and she has revived from Expressionist dance the use of masks, an appreciation for the solo, and an emphasis on expressive abstraction in movement.

After leaving the Folkwang School, Hoffmann worked as a dancer for both Kurt Jooss and Johann Kresnik. From 1975 to 1977 she directed the Folkwang Dance Studio with Susanne Linke. In this period she created her first choreographic work, a trio, which earned her a two-year stipend as a choreographer at the school. The pieces Duett, Solo, Fin al punto, and Rouge et noir followed. In 1977, she choreographed one of her best-known solos, Solo mit Sofa, set to the music of John Cage, in which a dancer is pinned to a sofa by a dress with an oversized train. Two years later, she created two more solo works, Steine, Bretter and Auch. Hoffmann herself danced these two solo works until 1984. In 1978 she spent six months in New York on a grant from the State of North Rhine-Westphalia.

== Tanztheater Bremen ==
In the fall of 1978, Hoffmann was hired along with Gerhard Bohner as director of the Tanztheater Bremen (Dance Theater Bremen) in the north German port city. Her first piece for the theater was Fünf Tage, fünf Nächte, followed by Hochzeit, a piece that dealt with courtship, wedding, marriage, and pregnancy in a range of moods from humor to seriousness. In 1980, she created Unkrautgarten, a piece about familiar neuroses; Erwartung; Pierrot Lunaire (set to the music of Arnold Schoenberg); and Kings and Queens, a piece that traveled to the Berlin Theatre.

After Gerhard Bohner left the theater in 1981, Hoffmann became solely responsible for the dance division. She went on to choreograph two of her most successful Bremen works: Callas (1983), which dealt with the theatrical world of illusion, followed by Dido und Aeneas (1984). In 1985, she staged Föhn and in 1986 Verreist.

== Schauspielhaus Bochum ==
In 1986, Hoffmann moved her ensemble from Bremen to the Schauspielhaus Bochum (Bochum Theater), then under the direction of Frank-Patrick Steckel, with the goal of creating work that was a closer melding of acting and dance. The Bochum theater renovated an old mine building as a 100-seat theater for her projects. Her first piece in Bochum was Machandel, followed by Horatier nach Heiner Müller, Ich schenk mei Herz, Hof, Zeche Eins, Zeche Zwei, and others.

Hoffmann's work has toured widely in Europe, being produced in Turin, Lisbon, Berlin, Leipzig, Amsterdam, Paris, and other cities. Among the performers who were members of Hoffmann's company in Bremen or Bochum are Robert Allen, Patrick Beauseigneur, Isabel Fünfhausen, Mimi Jeong, Maarten Kops, Anna Pocher, and Remo Rostagno.

Hoffmann left the Schauspielhaus Bochum at the end of the 1994-95 season and moved to Berlin, where she has since been working as a freelance choreographer and opera director. There she has worked on Richard Strauss's Ariadne auf Naxos (2003) and, with Isabel Mundry Das Mädchen aus der Fremde (2005, Mannheim National Theatre). In October 2008, she worked on a production of Strauss's opera Salome.

Hoffmann received the German Critics' Prize in 1982 and the Federal Cross of Merit First Class in 1992. In 1997 she was elected a member of the German Academy of Arts.
