= List of secretaries general of OPEC =

Below is a list with each secretary general of the Organization of the Petroleum Exporting Countries (OPEC), based on the organization's official publications. The secretary general is OPEC's chief executive officer.

List of OPEC secretaries general
No.	Name	Country	Tenure
1	Fuad Rouhani (Note: The first two secretaries general were Chairs of the Board of Governors in OPEC, and ex-officio secretaries general. The functions of the two positions were separated prior to the appointment of Secretary General Lutfi, in May 1965.)	Iran (Note: The first five secretaries general were chosen to represent OPEC's founding countries in alphabetical order, and then each of the next eight members took their turn. Only Angola, the last country to join OPEC (2007), has not yet held the position.)	21 Jan 1961 – 30 Apr 1964
2	Abdul Rahman al-Bazzaz	Iraq	1 May 1964 – 30 Apr 1965
3	Ashraf T. Lutfi	Kuwait	1 May 1965 – 31 Dec 1966
4	Mohammad Saleh Joukhdar	Saudi Arabia	1 Jan 1967 – 31 Dec 1967
5	Francisco R. Parra	Venezuela	1 Jan 1968 – 31 Dec 1968
6	Elrich Sanger	Indonesia	1 Jan 1969 – 31 Dec 1969
7	Omar el-Badri	Libya	1 Jan 1970 – 31 Dec 1970
8	Nadim al-Pachachi	Iraq	1 Jan 1971 – 31 Dec 1972
9	Abderrahman Khène	Algeria	1 Jan 1973 – 31 Dec 1974
10	M.O. Feyide	Nigeria	1 Jan 1975 – 31 Dec 1976
11	Ali M. Jaidah	Qatar	1 Jan 1977 – 31 Dec 1978
12	René G. Ortiz	Ecuador	1 Jan 1979 – 30 Jun 1981
13	Marc Saturnin Nan Nguema	Gabon	1 Jul 1981 – 30 Jun 1983
14	Mana Al Otaiba (Note: Due to political disagreements over the Secretary General position during the Iran–Iraq War, OPEC between mid-1983 and mid-1988 was led by Presidents with a mandate to supervise the Secretariat.)	United Arab Emirates	19 Jul 1983 – 31 Dec 1983
15	Kamel Hassan Maghur	Libya	1 Jan 1984 – 31 Oct 1984
16	Subroto	Indonesia	31 Oct 1984 – 9 Dec 1985
17	Arturo Hernández Grisanti	Venezuela	1 Jan 1986 – 30 Jun 1986
18	Rilwanu Lukman	Nigeria	1 Jul 1986 – 30 Jun 1988
19	Subroto	Indonesia	1 Jul 1988 – 30 Jun 1994
20	Abdallah Salem el-Badri	Libya	1 Jul 1994 – 31 Dec 1994
21	Rilwanu Lukman	Nigeria	1 Jan 1995 – 31 Dec 2000
22	Alí Rodríguez Araque	Venezuela	1 Jan 2001 – 30 Jun 2002
23	Álvaro Silva Calderón	Venezuela	1 Jul 2002 – 31 Dec 2003
24	Purnomo Yusgiantoro	Indonesia	1 Jan 2004 – 31 Dec 2004
25	Ahmed Al-Fahad Al-Ahmed Al-Sabah	Kuwait	1 Jan 2005 – 31 Dec 2005
26	Edmund Daukoru	Nigeria	1 Jan 2006 – 31 Dec 2006
27	Abdallah Salem el-Badri	Libya	1 Jan 2007 – 31 Jul 2016
28	Mohammed Barkindo (Note: Died in office)	Nigeria	1 Aug 2016 – 5 Jul 2022
29	Haitham al-Ghais	Kuwait	5 Jul 2022 –
