= Kamel Maghur =

Libyan lawyer and politician (1935–2002)

Kamel Hassan Maghur
- كامل حسن المقهور
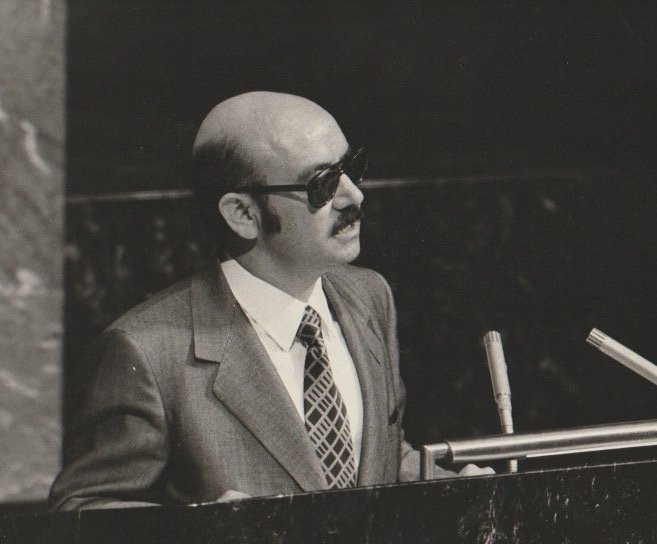
- Maghur speaking before the United Nations Security Council

15th Secretary General of OPEC (as President of OPEC)
- In office January 1984 – October 1984
- Preceded by: Mana Al Otaiba
- Succeeded by: Subroto

Minister of Foreign Affairs
- In office March 1986 – March 1987
- Preceded by: Ali Treki
- Succeeded by: Jadallah Azzuz at-Talhi

Minister of Oil
- In office March 1982 – March 1986
- Preceded by: Abd al-Salam al-Zaqar

Personal details
- Born: 1 January 1935 Dahra, Tripoli, Italian Libya
- Died: 4 January 2002 (aged 67) Rome, Italy

Kamel Hassan Maghur (Arabic: كامل حسن المقهور; 1 January 1935 – 4 January 2002) was a Libyan lawyer, diplomat, and writer.

== Biography ==
Kamel Maghur was born in Dahra, Tripoli, Italian Libya on January 1, 1935. He graduated from Cairo University with a degree in law. Maghur became a recognized lawyer, leading several notable trials, including representing the Libyan Arab Socialist Ba'ath Party and the Arab Nationalist Movement in the early 1960s.

In late 1960s, he represented several high ranking officials of the Kingdom of Libya in the Libyan People's Court, a televised trial. He then participated in the negotiations leading to the closure of foreign military bases in Libya and the oil agreement. Subsequently, he was appointed to the Supreme Court and responsible for the Supreme Court Journal.

The start of his diplomatic career was marked by his appointment as Libya's permanent representative to the United Nations and ambassor to Canada. At the UN, he held the role of Chairman of the UN Arab group and led initiatives which adopted Arabic into the official languages of the United Nations in 1973 and granted observer status to the Palestine Liberation Organization. He then served as ambassador to France and the first ambassador of Libya to China. Maghur led the Libyan delegation to the International Court of Justice related to the continental shelf dispute between Libya and Tunisia. The result of the ICJ judgement led to Libya's eventual development of the Bouri Field, the largest producing oilfield in the Mediterranean.

In March 1982, he was appointed the minister of oil after a US ban on Libyan oil imports was applied. During this period, he helped ensure the oil sector was kept afloat. He was President of the OPEC Conference at the 69th and 70th Meetings of the Conference, acting as Secretary General in 1984. In 1986, he was briefly Libya's minister for foreign affairs, before returning to the legal profession he endeared. He subsequently founded Maghur & Partners, his private law practice.

In the early 1990s, he led the defense team in the Libya–Chad Territorial Dispute case, once again appearing before the ICJ. In the late 1990s, he was Libya's Head of Delegation at the International Criminal Court. Maghur lawyer handling sanctions and charges associated with the Lockerbie bombing. Maghur led the defense team in negotiations with Hans Corell, Under-Secretary-General at the United Nations, to secure just trial conditions and the right to a fair trial for the two Libyan accused in 1998. This led to the presence of the two accused before a special sitting of the Scottish Court in the Netherlands at the Pan Am Flight 103 bombing trial and the lifting of decade-old sanctions on Libya. He continued to head the defense team of Lamin Khalifah Fhimah and Abdelbaset al-Megrahi, in addition to their respective solicitors and advocates who represented them.

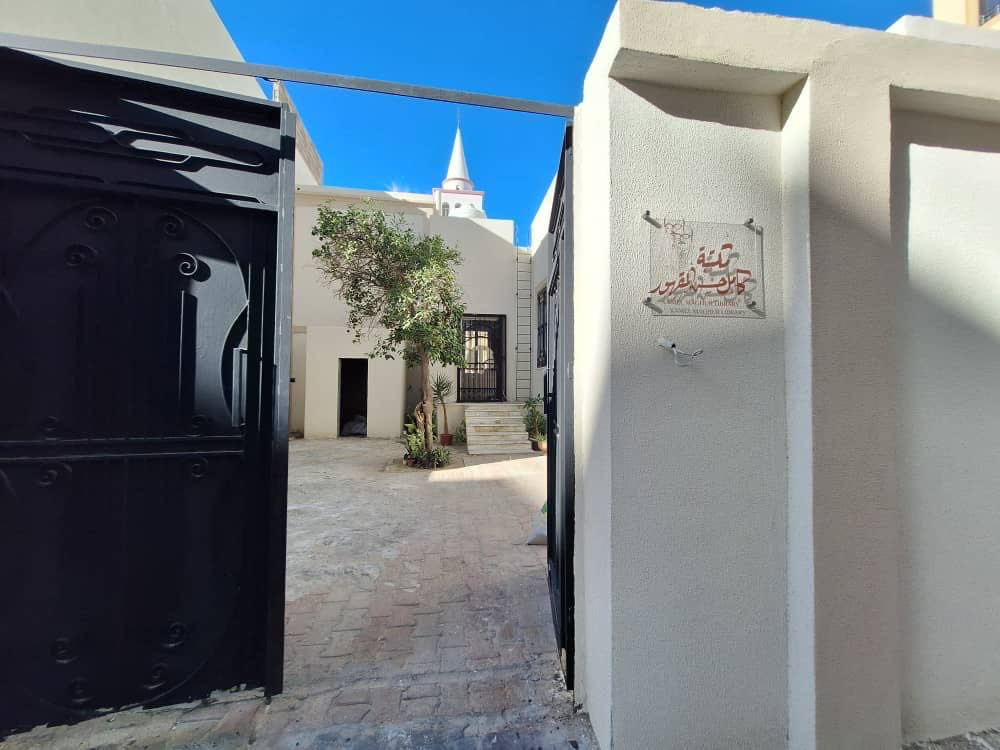
Kamel Maghur Library in Dahra, Tripoli, Libya

Maghur was a pioneer of the short story in Libya. His works reflect his people's hardships and aspirations. In his semi-autobiographical Mahatat, published in 1995, Maghur mirrors his life between his birth in Dahra, Tripoli and his formative years in Cairo. Maghur's body of work includes seven collections of short stories and two articles and essays. He and his wife, Suhir El Gheryani had seven children.

Honouring his legacy, his daughter Azza Maghur, who is also a lawyer and short story writer, established the Kamel Maghur Library in 2024. The library features a diverse collection of over 3,000 multilingual titles within literature, history, periodicals and law. It is located in central Tripoli, Libya (Dahra district), where he was born.

In parallel, the Kamel Maghur Short Story Award was launched. The award recognizes exceptional Arabic short story writing. The inaugural winners will be announced on 1 January 2025, on the anniversary of the day he was born, and will continue to be granted annually.
