= Rilwanu Lukman =

Nigerian engineer (1938–2014)

Minister of Petroleum Resources
- In office 18 December 2008 – 17 March 2010
- President: Umaru Musa Yar'Adua
- Preceded by: Edmund Daukoru
- Succeeded by: Diezani Allison-Madueke
- In office February 1986 – February 1990
- President: Ibrahim Babangida

18th and 21st Secretary General of OPEC
- In office 1 January 1995 – 31 December 2000
- Preceded by: Abdallah Salem el-Badri
- Succeeded by: Alí Rodríguez Araque
- In office 1 July 1986 – 30 June 1988 as President of OPEC
- Preceded by: Arturo Hernández Grisanti
- Succeeded by: Subroto

Federal Minister of Mines, Power and Steel
- In office 1984–1985

Personal details
- Born: 26 August 1938 Zaria, British Nigeria (now Kaduna State, Nigeria)
- Died: 21 July 2014 (aged 75) Vienna, Austria

Rilwanu Lukman (26 August 1938 – 21 July 2014) was a Nigerian engineer who held several ministerial positions in the Nigerian Federal government before becoming Secretary General of OPEC (Organization of the Petroleum Exporting Countries) from 1 January 1995 to 31 December 2000. He died on 21 July 2014. On 18 December 2008, Lukman was appointed Minister of Petroleum Resources by Nigerian president Umaru Musa Yar'Adua, holding office until March 2010.

== Birth, education and early career ==
Lukman was born in Zaria, Kaduna State. He trained as a mining engineer at the College of Arts, Science, and Technology, Zaria (now Ahmadu Bello University), and then at Imperial College, London.

He earned a higher degree in mining engineering from the University of Mining and Metallurgy in Leoben, Austria (1967–1968).

He obtained a degree in mineral economics from McGill University, Montreal in 1978, and an honorary doctorate degree in chemical engineering from the University of Bologna in Italy.

His first job in the mining industry was as an assistant mining engineer with A B Statsgruvor of Sweden (1962–1964). After returning to Nigeria, Lukman was appointed an inspector of mines, later senior inspector and then acting assistant chief inspector in the Federal Ministry of Mines & Power in Jos, Plateau State (1964–1970). He then became general manager of the Cement Company of Northern Nigeria (1970–1974).

By 1979 Lukman had become general manager and chief executive officer of the Nigerian Mining Corporation, Jos.

== Senior government and OPEC positions ==
Lukman was appointed Minister of Mines, Power and Steel from 1984 to 1985 in the government of General Muhammadu Buhari. In 1986 he was appointed Federal Minister of Petroleum Resources, holding that position until February 1990. In that role, he was also chairman of the board of the Nigerian National Petroleum Corporation. He was briefly minister of foreign affairs between January and September 1990.

He was chairman of the board of directors of the National Electric Power Authority (1993–1994).

From 1986 he served eight consecutive terms as OPEC president.

Lukman was elected OPEC secretary general on 22 November 1994, succeeding Dr. Subroto of Indonesia, whose three-year term ended on 30 June 1994. Lukman was a compromise choice between two competing candidates, Hossein Kazempour Ardebili of Iran and Alirio Parra of Venezuela. He was re-elected to a second term in 1997, holding office until the end of 2000.

He was a central figure in the agreement between Iran and Saudi Arabia to control oil prices early in 1999, followed by agreements to reduce production levels, which led to a surge in prices towards the end of the 1990s.

== Fourth Republic career ==
When Olusegun Obasanjo came into office at the start of the Nigerian Fourth Republic, the president retained direct control of the Oil Ministry. Lukman was appointed Special Adviser on Petroleum and Energy Matters to the president in June 1999, replacing Godwin Aret Adams, and chairman of the Nigerian National Petroleum Corporation (NNPC).

In July 1999 his office announced that 47 offshore Exploration and Production licences awarded by the government to local companies had been cancelled, including 11 highly attractive deep-water blocks given in March 1999 to companies with links to the military.

He said the blocks would be open to commercial tender from both local and foreign companies.

He was in favour of restructuring the NNPC to make it a fully commercial enterprise, but did not agree that it should divest its controlling stake in the oil producing joint ventures, and at that time was not in favour of rapid deregulation of the domestic fuels market.

Lukman resigned in November 2003. The resignation was said to be due to a dispute over oil sector reform with the group managing director of the NNPC. Jackson Gaius Obaseki.

The friction had apparently been building up after Lukman completed his term as OPEC president in early 2002, and after Obasanjo moved control and administration of oil blocks from the Petroleum Resources ministry to the NNPC in June 2002.

He then became the chairman of Afren Nigeria when it was established in May 2005.

He is also a member of the Society of Petroleum Engineers (SPE) and served on the SPE board as regional Director for Africa.

In 2007, Lukman became a member of the Supervisory Board of Dietsmann NV of the Netherlands, a leading International Operation & Maintenance company in the upstream energy sector.

Lukman was appointed Honorary (unpaid) Advisor on Energy and Strategic Matters to President Umaru Yar'Adua in August 2007.

In December 2008 Lukman was appointed Minister of Petroleum Resources, and resigned from his position with Afren, putting his holdings in a blind trust.

In February 2010 there were rumours that Lukman had tendered his resignation after a shakeup in the cabinet by the new acting president, Goodluck Jonathan, but that it had not been accepted.

In March 2010, he warned that the scarcity of petroleum products in Nigeria would only get worse as long as the government held back on deregulating the industry.

He left office on 17 March 2010 when acting president Goodluck Jonathan dissolved his cabinet.

== Corruption ==
Lukman was accused of facilitating the P&ID corrupt contract, which almost cost Nigeria an economic-crumbling $11bn arbitral award, by ordering his aide, Taofiq Tijani, to "deliberately overlook" P&ID's shortcomings and push the deal through.

The EFCC accused Lukman of breaking Nigerian laws by approving a deal that he lacked authority to approve and engaged in, not doing due diligence on the company, which lacked legally required approvals from Nigerian government's relevant procurement agencies.

Others who have been linked to corruption regarding this fraudulent contract are Taofiq Tijani, Grace Taiga and Olasupo Shasore.

== Honours ==
Lukman was made a Knight Commander of the Order of the British Empire (KBE) in 1989 and Officer of the Légion d'honneur of France in 1990, as well as being conferred with the First Class rank of the Order of the Liberator from Venezuela. He was the first African to be honoured with the Fellowship of the Imperial College, University of London.
