= Haitham al-Ghais =

Secretary General of OPEC since 2022

- هيثم الغيص
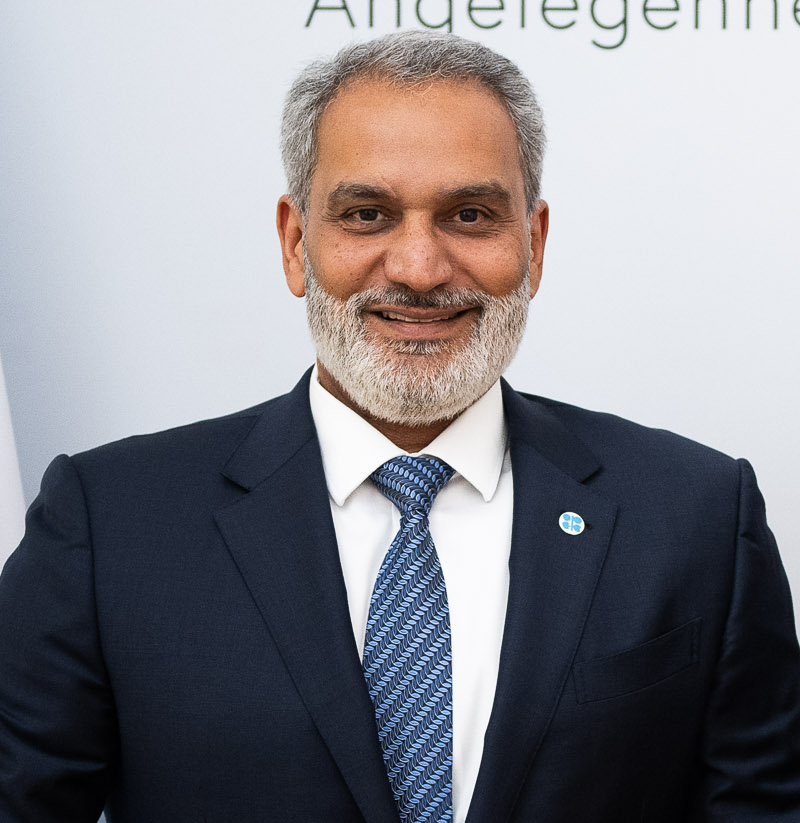
- Al-Ghais in 2025

29th Secretary General of OPEC
- Incumbent
- Assumed office 5 July 2022
- Preceded by: Mohammed Barkindo

Personal details
- Born: October 1969 (age 56–57) Kuwait City, Kuwait
- Education: University of San Francisco

Haitham al-Ghais (Arabic: هيثم الغيص; born October 1969) is a Kuwaiti oil executive and diplomat who has served as Secretary General of OPEC since 2022. He previously held senior roles at the Kuwait Petroleum Corporation, including Deputy Managing Director for International Marketing.

== Early life and education ==
Al-Ghais was born in October 1969 in Kuwait City, Kuwait. His father served as Kuwait's governor at OPEC. In 1990, he graduated from the University of San Francisco with a degree in political science.

== Career ==
From 1991 to 1993, Al-Ghais operated in the Kuwaiti Ministry of Foreign Affairs. In 1993, he joined the International Marketing Sector of the Kuwait Petroleum Corporation (KPC), later serving as its Crude Oil Marketing Representative and leading the company's regional offices in China and the United Kingdom. In 2021, Al-Ghais was appointed as KPC's Deputy Managing Director for International Marketing. He was also part of Kuwait's delegation to OPEC meetings and to the Declaration of Cooperation (DoC) between OPEC and non-OPEC oil-producing countries.

From 2017 and 2021, he served as Kuwait's Governor to OPEC and was a member of the organisation’s Internal Audit Committee, which he later chaired. In 2017, Al-Ghais chaired OPEC's first Joint Technical Committee (JTC), continuing to participate in JTC and Joint Ministerial Monitoring Committee (JMMC) meetings. In January 2022, he was unanimously appointed to a three-year term as OPEC Secretary-General. Following the 5 July 2022 death of his predecessor, Nigerian politician Mohammed Barkindo, Al-Ghais served as the organization's interim leader ahead of his planned August 2022 start date.

During his term, Al-Ghais has urged member nations to focus international climate negotiations on reducing carbon emissions, rather than prohibiting the extraction and sale of fossil fuels. He has also stated that insufficient investment in oil and gas could contribute to market volatility and pose risks to global energy security. Al-Ghais additionally expressed the view that global oil demand will continue to grow and that there is no imminent peak in global oil demand and that petroleum-based products will to play a role in global electrification and industrial development.

In 2025, his term as Secretary General of OPEC was renewed for a further three years, extending to 2028.

== Personal life ==
Al-Ghais is fluent in Arabic, English, Spanish, French, German, and Portuguese, and also speaks Chinese.
