= Susanne Linke =

German dancer and choreographer

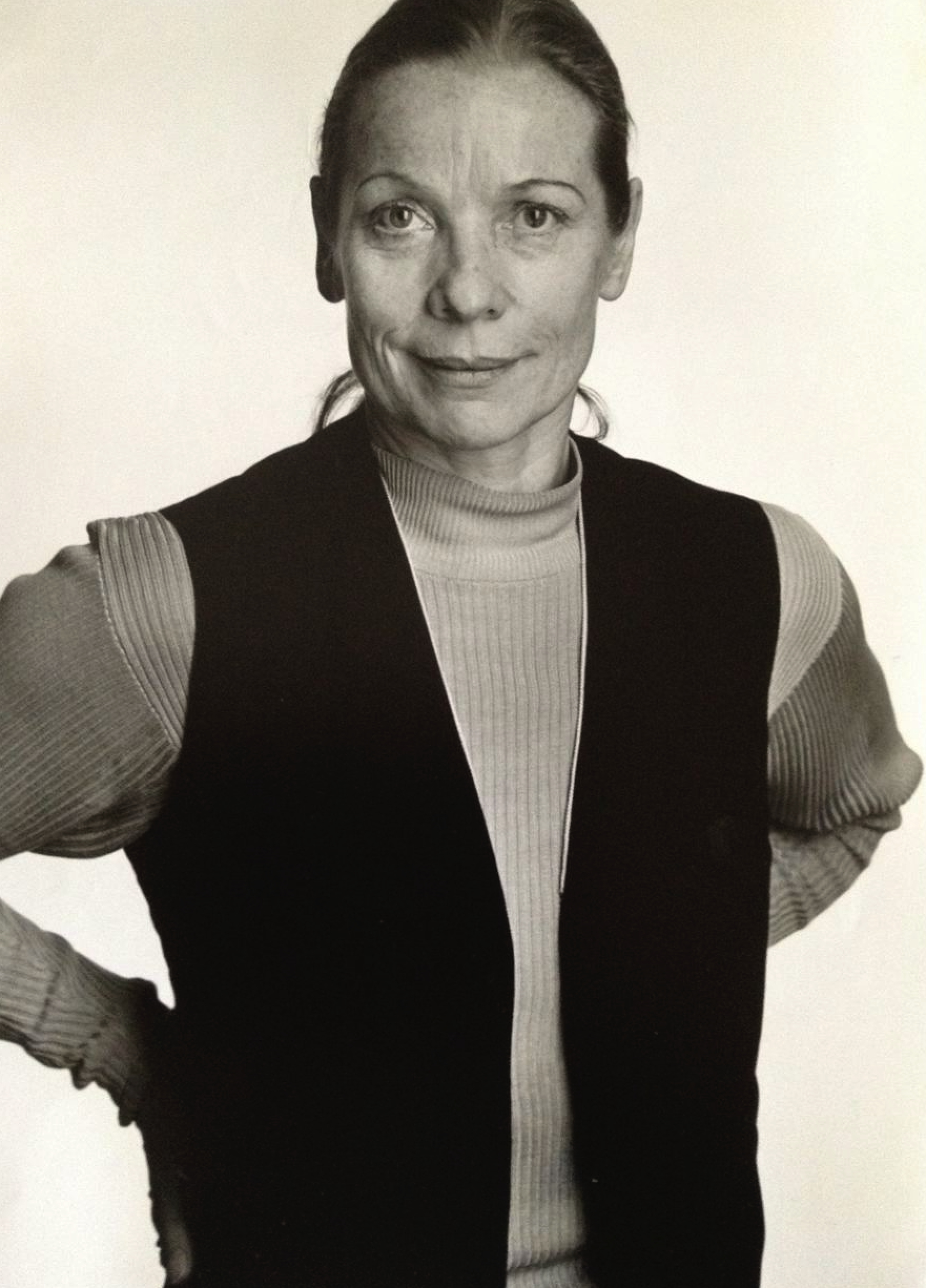
Portrait of Susanne Linke

Susanne Linke (born 19 June 1944) is an internationally renowned German dancer and choreographer who is one of the major innovators of German Tanztheater, along with Pina Bausch and Reinhild Hoffmann.

== Family ==
Susanne Linke was born in Lüneburg, Germany, to Heinz Linke (a pastor) and Rosi Linke-Schäfer (born Peschko). A hearing and speech disorder and related issues delayed the development of her speaking ability as a child. The German pianist Sebastian Peschko is her uncle.

== Career ==
Linke only began to study dance at the age of twenty, when she went to Berlin to take lessons from Mary Wigman at her studio. Three years later she moved to Essen to pursue dance at the Folkwang Hochschule (Folkwang Academy) founded by Kurt Jooss. In 1970, she became a dancer in the school's dance company, the Folkwang Tanzstudio (Folkwang Dance Studio), then under the direction of Pina Bausch. During the period from 1970 to 1973, she also danced with the Rotterdam Dance Center. In 1975, Linke and Reinhild Hoffmann together took over leadership of the Folkwang Tanzstudio from Bausch, a position Linke continued to hold for a decade.

Linke has choreographed original dance works since 1970, becoming known for a style that is intense, austere, and neoexpressionist. Two of her 1975 dances—Danse funèbre (Funeral Dance) and Trop Trad (Too Trad)— were awarded prizes. Other works from the 1970s and 1980s include Puppe? (Doll?, 1975), Die Nächste bitte (Next Please, 1978), Im Bade wannen (Bath Tubbing, 1980), Wowerwiewas (1980), Flut (Flood, 1981), Frauenballett (Women's Ballet, 1981), Es schwant (It Continues, 1982), and Wir können nicht alle nur Schwäne sein (We Can't All Only Be Swans, 1982). Her first full-evening work was based on the Bacchae of Euripides. Schritte verfolgen (Follow the Steps, 1985), Linke's first major solo ballet, dealt with her problematic childhood and the development of a dancer.

Since the 1980s, Linke has participated in the major international dance festivals, often dancing her own solos. Her international solo career has been significantly supported by the Goethe-Institut. In 1985, she resigned from the management of the Folkwang Dance Studio and began to work primarily as a freelance choreographer, making work for such well-known groups as the José Limón Company in New York, the Paris Opera, and the Nederlands Dans Theater.

In 1987, Linke showed her own version of four solo choreographies reconstructed from films of Dore Hoyer's 1962 Afectos Humanos (Human Affects) cycle dedicated to the themes of vanity, lust, fear, and love. She added a fifth segment, Dolor (Sorrow) as a confrontation with Hoyer's work and an homage to Hoyer, whom Linke greatly admired and had met during her student days in Essen. She followed this up with two further works, the duets Affekte (Affects, 1988) und Affekte/Gelb' (Affects/Yellow, 1990), that extended the basic themes of Afectos Humanos through a relationship between two people. Linke danced these with her partner Urs Dietrich.

In the early 1990s, she founded the Susanne Linke Company at the Hebbel Theater in Berlin. Then, in 1994, she co-founded (with Urs Dietrich) a new dance company at the Bremer Theater in Bremen and continued to direct this company until 2000. In 2000-01, she co-founded a new choreographic center in Essen, the Choreographisches Zentrum Essen, and became its artistic director. Since 2001, she has worked frequently as a freelance choreographer and dancer.

== Awards ==
In 2007, the German Professional Association for Dance Education gave Linke the prestigious German Dance Prize in honor of her life's work in dance. In 2008, she was appointed to the French Order of Arts and Letters. Since 2010, she has been an honorary professor at the Folkwang University of the Arts in Essen.
