= Mirza Ahmad Ashtiani =

Iranian Ayatollah (1882–1975)

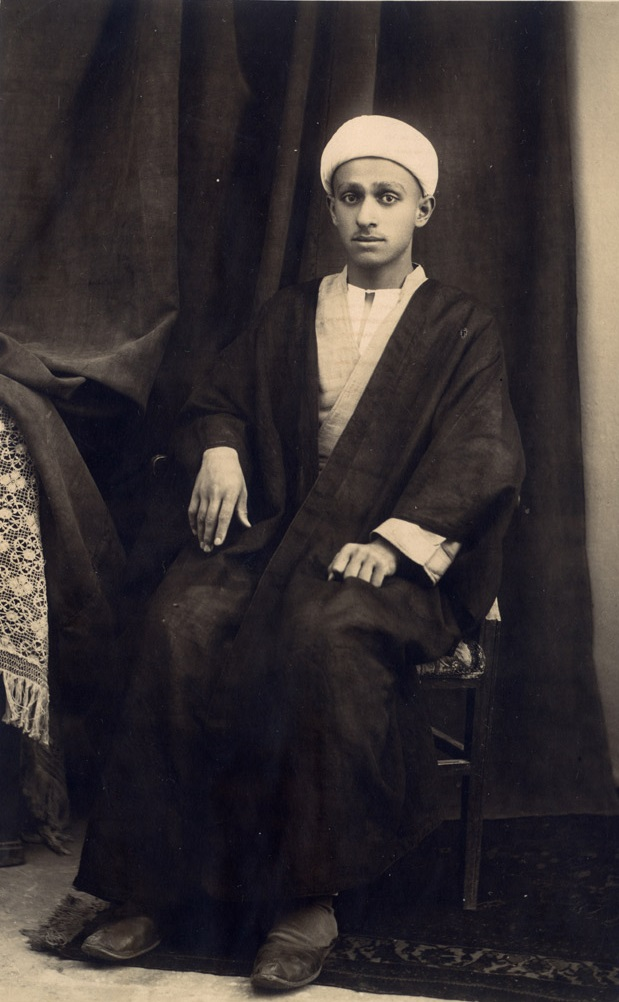
Mirza Ahmad Ashtiani in 1901

Mirza Ahmad Ashtiani (Persian: میرزا احمد آشتیانی; 1882 – 1975 in Tehran) was an Iranian Shi'a jurist and philosopher. He taught theology in Tehran for about 40 years.

== Birth ==
Mirza Ahmad Ashtiani was born in Tehran. He was the fourth and youngest son of Mirza Hassan Ashtiani, a prominent jurist under the reign of Mozaffar ad-Din Shah Qajar and Naser al-Din Shah Qajar. He became a jurist and a Shi'a Imam.

== Education ==
After studying liberal arts, he took courses in the philosophy of law. After his father's death, his education then became more philosophy-centric, and he began teaching in the school Sepahsalar. After a while studying different philosophical subjects, he took advanced courses in Transcendentalism, Mysticism, medicine, mathematics and astronomy. In 1961, he headed to Najaf where in addition to Mirza Nain and Qazya’aldyn Iraqi, established his own philosophy of parliamentarianism course. After ten years of residence in Najaf, he returned to Tehran, Iran, where he spent the rest of his life, teaching social sciences, writing books, and guiding the people.

== Students ==
- Mustafa Hussaini Tabatabaie
- Sayyed Jalal-ed-Din Ashtiani
- Hassan Hassanzadeh Amoli
- Mirza Mohammad Bagher Ashtiani
- Mohammad Sadeghi Tehrani
- Seyed Abbas Tabatabaei
