= Ejido, Venezuela =

Town in the state of Mérida, Venezuela

Ejido
- San Buenaventura de Ejido
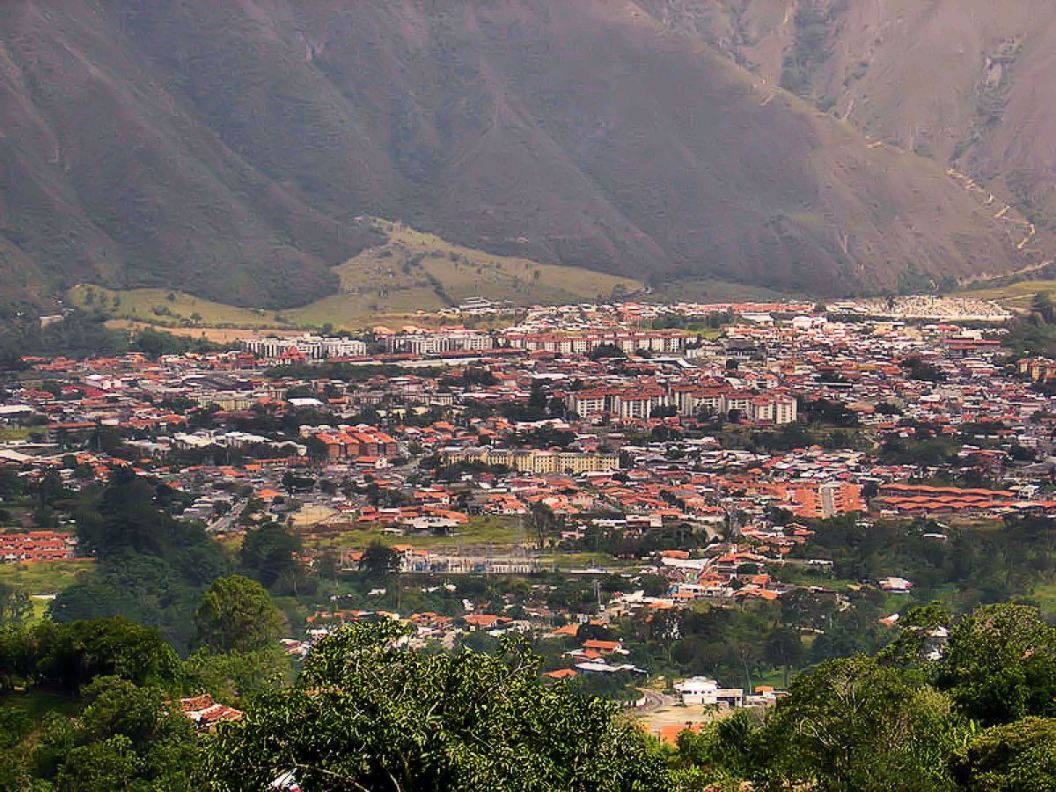

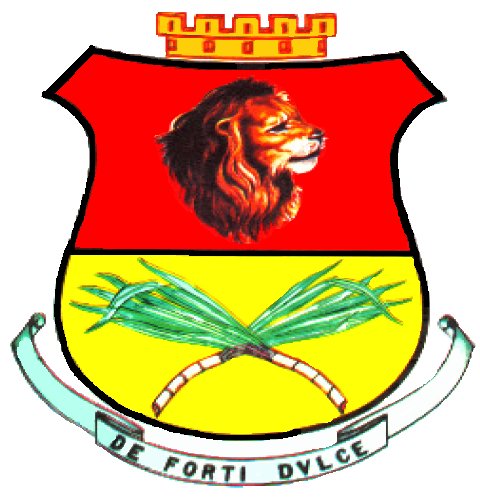
- Flag Coat of arms

- Location within Venezuela
- Coordinates: 8°20′0″N 71°24′0″W
- Country: Venezuela
- State: Mérida
- Municipality: Campo Elías Municipality
- Founded: 14 July 1650
- Elevation: 1,200 m (3,900 ft)

Population (2011)
  - Total: 99,837
  - Demonym: Ejidense
- Time zone: VST
- Postal code: 5111
- Area code: 0274
- Climate: Aw

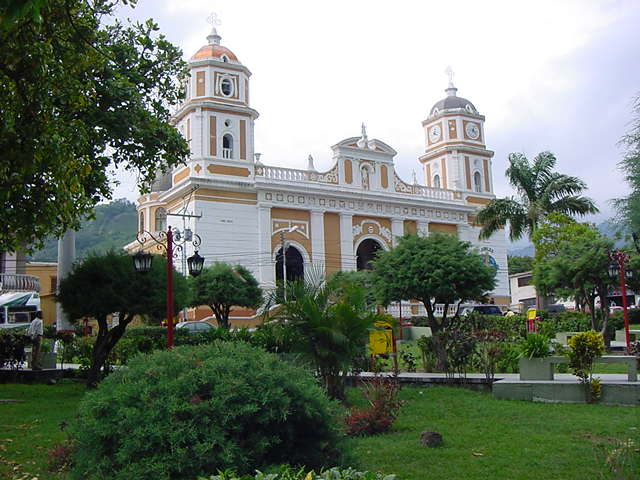
Ejido's Plaza Bolivar

Ejido (Spanish pronunciation: [eˈxiðo]) is a town in the state of Mérida, Venezuela. It is the shire town of the Campo Elías Municipality. It was founded in 1650 in an area with indigenous Guayabas, and became a center for cane sugar cultivation. It is close to the state capital, Mérida, Mérida, and forms part of its metropolitan area, with a total population of around 350,000. It is connected to Mérida by public transport, including the Mérida trolleybus system.
