= National Defense College of the United Arab Emirates =

Education institution in the United Arab Emirates

National Defence College of the United Arab Emirates
- Type: Military Academy
- Established: December 4, 2013
- Students: senior military officers and civilians
- Location: Abu Dhabi, United Arab Emirates
- Website: Website of the National Defense College

The National Defense College of the United Arab Emirates is a military training institution in Abu Dhabi, United Arab Emirates, providing training for Emirati military officers and civilians. It was officially opened in December 2013 by Sheikh Mohammed bin Zayed Al Nahyan, the current president of the UAE, and the Supreme Commander of the UAE Armed Forces. The college employs faculty from countries in Africa, Asia, and the Middle East, with the majority coming from Egypt.
