= Assadollah Hosseinpoor =

Iranian military commander (c 1882–1954)

Timsar Assadollah Hosseinpour
- اسدالله حسین‌پور
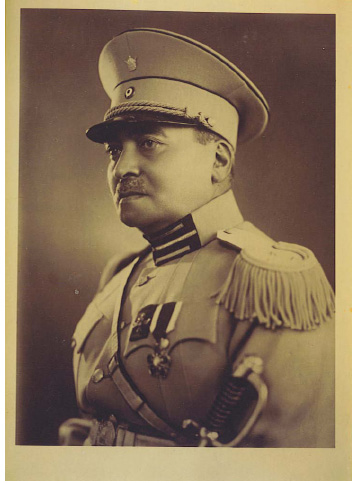
- Born: c. 1882; Tehran, Qajar Iran
- Died: 1954 (aged 71–72); Tehran, Pahlavi Iran
- Military career
- Allegiance: Qajar Iran (1910–1925); Pahlavi Iran (1925–1942/43)
- Branch: Persian Cossack Brigade (1910–1921); Imperial Iranian Ground Forces (1921–1942)
- Service years: 1910–1942/43
- Rank: Major General
- Commands: See below
- Awards: Sevoum Hoot (Esfand) Medal; Sepah Medal; Zoulfaghar Medal

Assadollah Hosseinpour (Persian: اسد الله حسین پور) was born in 1882 or 1883 in Tehran, Iran. He was one of Ahad Agha Shirvani's three sons, and grandson of Moustafa Khan Shirvani, governor of the Shirvan Khanate), a descendant of the Shirvan Shah who fought against Shah Esmaeil from the Persian Safavid dynasty. Following the defeat of the Shirvan Shah, the Khanate of Shirvan was annexed to Persia, but Mustafa Khan retained the governorship of Shirvan.

Hosseinpour's grandfather Mustafa Khan was a powerful landowner and a senior military commander in Shirvan. He married a Georgian princess while the khanates of Shirvan and Georgia were both parts of Persia. Georgia, Shirvan, and 15 other provinces or territories were later annexed to Russia, after three Russo-Persian Wars, during the Qajar dynasty, upon which the commanders of their armies, refusing to serve under the new Russian leadership, left their command posts and immigrated with their families to Persia, remaining loyal to the Shah of Persia.

== Military career ==
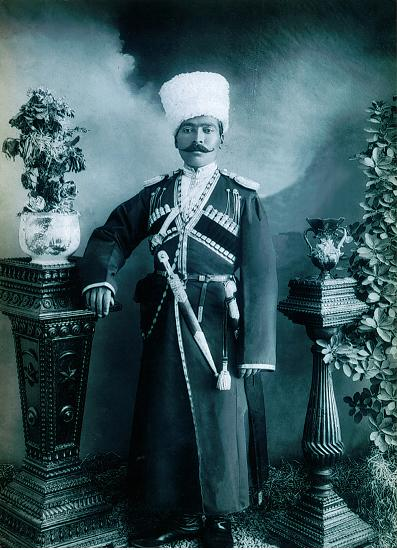
Young Colonel Hosseinpour in Persian Cossack military uniform

Hosseinpour graduated in 1910 from the academy of the Persian Cossack Brigade, as one of its fourth graduating class. He was a classmate of the future General Fazlollah Zahedi (who became Prime Minister under Shah Mohammad Reza Pahlavi in 1953) and Colonel Mehdi Gholi Tajbakhsh. On graduation from the academy, he performed his military duties under Rouhoullah Mirza for about two years and was then appointed Commander to the armies of the Iranian provinces of Azerbaijan and Kurdistan. He was later transferred to the Cavalry Division of the Persian Cossack Army and took part in World War I, during which he held the rank of lieutenant. At the end of the war, he was promoted to major.

Along with a number of other Cossack commanders, Hosseinpour was a founding member of the new Imperial Iranian Armed Forces during the reign of Reza Shah. He headed the Cavalry Division in the February 21, 1921, coup headed by Reza Shah. He was one of a number of officers who reached and secured Tehran. Tehran was completely surrounded by a huge canal for protection against potential military invasion and robbers. A tall wall also encircled the city, with twelve huge metal gates that were locked at night and protected by military guards. The military force headed by the coup officers left Karaj, a town about 40 km from Tehran, and arrived at the Ghazvin Gate (close to the present Mehrabad International Airport). When Hosseinpour reached the gate, he told the military officers guarding it that all the other gates had already been taken and that it was in their best interests to surrender.

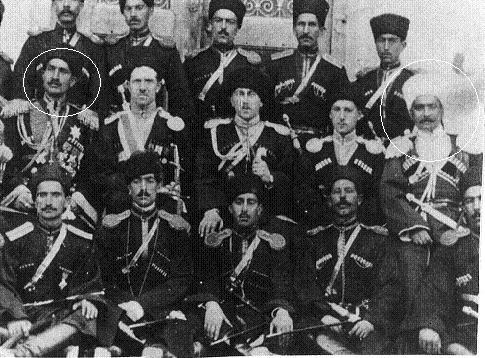
Colonel Hosseinpour (second row, first right) with the white hat, Reza Shah (second row, first left), shown with white circles around their heads, with other commanders who carried out the 1921 Coup

The guards surrendered and opened the gate, and the army entered the city without any bloodshed and secured the capital. A few days later, Hossienpour was promoted to colonel and appointed (with the cooperation of a few other top military commanders) to convert and create the modern Imperial Iranian Army Ground Forces, as head of the Cavalry Division based at the Abbas Abad military headquarters. A military medal called Sevoum Hoot, or Sevvoum Esfand, was awarded to the participating commanders and officers around 1928.

Hosseinpour retired from the Imperial Iranian Army at the age of around 60 and spent the rest of his life monitoring the affairs of his villages and estates and engaging in philanthropic activities.

=== Command posts ===
During his military career, Hosseinpour held the following military commands:

- Commander of the Cavalry Division
- Commander of the Army of the Azerbaijan Province
- Commander of the Army of the Kerman Province
- Commander of the Army of the Kurdistan Province
- Head of the Imperial Iranian Army Juridical Tribunal
- Chief Military Advisor to the Imperial Iranian Ground Forces

=== Military medals ===
Hosseinpour was awarded military medals including:

- Coup of the Sevvoum Esfand Medal
- Sepah Medal
- Zoulfaghar Medal

== Personal life ==
Hosseinpoor's father lost his parents and brother at a young age and inherited all the wealth and estates of the family. The Iranian government granted the ownership of a number of estates, farms, parcels of land, and villages to him and a few other top commanders in compensation for their fathers' financial losses incurred when they immigrated to Persia. Hosseinpoor's family received numerous villages, farms, estates, large parcels of land and houses, which Assadollah eventually inherited.

Hosseinpour's grandfather was Amir Hossein, a high ranking commander of Shirvan and a close colleague and friend of Pasha Khan Pashai. He fought alongside Colonel Pasha Khan against the Russian Army in the war of 1863. Pasha Khan devoted a lot of effort to develop a farm named Koushk-e Mir Hossein, which was named after either Hosseinpour's grandfather or his own grandfather. Amir Hossein married the daughter of one of the landlords of Saraband territory in the town of Arak, Iran, all of whose wealth (villages and large parcels of land) was inherited by Hosseinpour as well.

Hosseinpour lost his mother at the age of 12. His sister was married to Abdoullah Mostoufi, governor of Arak, but she too died at a young age. Hosseinpour's father's uncle (Pashai), persuaded him to join the Persian Cossack Brigade Academy.

At the age of 20, Hosseinpour inherited from his father and came into an aristocrat's life. While a student at the Persian Cossack Brigade Academy, he frequently visited the Pashai's house to call on his cousins. Pashai's wife once said that in 1906, when Hossseinpour visited them, he was still a student at the academy.

Hosseinpour married Badieh Khanum Monadjemi, an adherent of the Baháʼí Faith. Their first child was a daughter named Fakhralzaman Khanum and their second, born a few years later, a son named Amir Houshang, who died while still a child.

Badieh Khanum died of breast cancer a few years later, and Hosseinpour married her sister, Monireh Khanum. They had three daughters (Tourandokht, Pourandokht, and Victoria) and two sons (Abdolreza and Tooraj. Abdolreza's son, Amir Hosseinpour became an opera director and choreographer based in London). Monireh Khanum died in her sleep at the age of 48, and four years later, in 1954, Hosseinpour died of a heart attack in Iran. He was buried in Tehran's Baháʼí cemetery (Golestaneh Javid), which was destroyed by Islamic mobs after the Iranian political unrest of 1979 in Iran.
