= Johann Kresnik =

Austrian dancer, choreographer, and theater director (1939–2019)

Johann "Hans" Kresnik (12 December 1939 – 27 July 2019) was an Austrian dancer, and theater director working in the tradition of German Tanztheater (dance theater) who is known for his politically charged approach to dance.

== Early life ==
Johann Kresnik was born on 12 December 1939 in Sankt Margarethen, in the municipality of Bleiburg in the South Austrian state of Carinthia. It has been said that at the age of three he witnessed the shooting of his father—then serving in the Wehrmacht—by Slovenian partisans. He began his professional life working as a toolmaker, and his career as a performer began almost accidentally when he got a walk-on part at the Graz opera house in the late 1950s. Not long afterwards, unwilling to undertake required military service in Austria due to his antiwar views, he moved to Germany, where he has lived ever since. Although he had a background in gymnastics, he only began serious dance training when he moved to Cologne in 1962, where he studied with Leon Wojcikowski and Aurel von Miloss.

By the time he left Austria, Kresnik had joined the Austrian Communist Party, and he took part in numerous political demonstrations in Germany during the 1960s. He was involved with Marxist activism in Cologne and became acquainted with the German Marxist philosopher Ernst Bloch in Cologne's chess club.

== Career ==
In Cologne, Kresnik developed his skills quickly and worked as a principal dancer for the Cologne Opera from 1964 to 1968. When George Balanchine brought his Nutcracker ballet to Cologne with the New York City Ballet, he was a guest artist for the company. During this period, he also worked with Agnes de Mille and Maurice Béjart.

From 1968 to 1978 he was the ballet master and lead choreographer for the Bremer Tanztheater in Bremen. From 1980 to 1989, he was active in Heidelberg as a choreographer and director. He returned to Bremen for the period 1989 to 1994, and then beginning in 1994 worked for three years at the Volksbühne Berlin and as choreographer at the Burgtheater, Vienna. For five years beginning in 2003 he led the Choreographic Theater of Bonn.

Kresnik is very prolific, having created around 100 full-length works. Among the awards that Kresnik has received for his work are the Berlin Theatre Prize (1990), the German Critics Prize (1990), and the Berlin Bear (B.Z. Culture Prize, 1994).

In 2011, a Center for Choreography in Kresnik's birthplace of Bleiburg was founded in his honor and named Choreografie Zentrum Johann Kresnik.

== Artistic style ==
Kresnik works within the tradition of tanztheater and expressionist dance pioneered by Kurt Jooss (whose piece The Green Table he greatly admired) and Mary Wigman. He has also been inspired by the films of Federico Fellini and Pier Paolo Pasolini. He began making work around the same time as Pina Bausch but decided he preferred the term 'choreographic theater' in place of 'dance theater' when referring to his own dance-theater hybrid. From the outset, he has made politically charged work with the intention of subverting both balletic dance norms and social norms. His pieces are often intentionally provocative and have such themes such as imperialism, militarism, terrorism, Nazism, war, murder, suicide, and madness. His outspokenness, Marxist politics, championship of cultural outsiders, and often extreme choreography have earned him a reputation as an enfant terrible and the nickname "Berserker".

Quite a few of his works, including Paradise? (1968, about the assassination of student activist Rudi Dutschke), Sylvia Plath (1985), Ulrike Meinhof (1990), Frida Kahlo (1992), Francis Bacon (1993), Ernst Jünger (1994), and Hannelore Kohl (2004), have been focused around the troubled lives and achievements of well-known individuals. An unusually large proportion of his works revolve around female protagonists. Ulrike Meinhof is considered the German performance world's first major attempt to grapple with the impact of the Red Army Faction on the country's culture.

Kresnik's first choreographic work, O Sela Pei (1967) was inspired by texts by people with schizophrenia. It premiered in 1967 and, with its themes of madness, anger, transgression, and death, prefigured many of his later works.

Other productions include Mars (1983), Macbeth (1988), Oedipus (1989), Wendewut (based on a story by Günter Gaus, 1993), Last Days of Mankind, and Vogeler. In his 2008 interpretation of Giuseppe Verdi's opera A Masked Ball, he deployed a cast of three dozen men and women all over 50 and naked except for Mickey Mouse masks on a stage representing the ruins of the World Trade Center.

== Death ==
Kresnik died on 27 July 2019 at the age of 79, a coronary heart attack. at Klagenfurt. He had worked on even at a ripe old age, so he presented the revival of his piece Macbeth from 1988 with the ensemble TANZLIN.Z, which opened Vienna International Dance Festival ImPulsTanz 2019 on 11 July 2019. And he had been honoured the same day with the Golden Medal of Merit of the State of Vienna by the City Councillor for Art and Science. Kresnik had given his personal archive with 40 years of dance history as early as August 2008 to the Academy of Arts, Berlin.
