= International airport =

Airport with facilities for international travel (border control and customs)

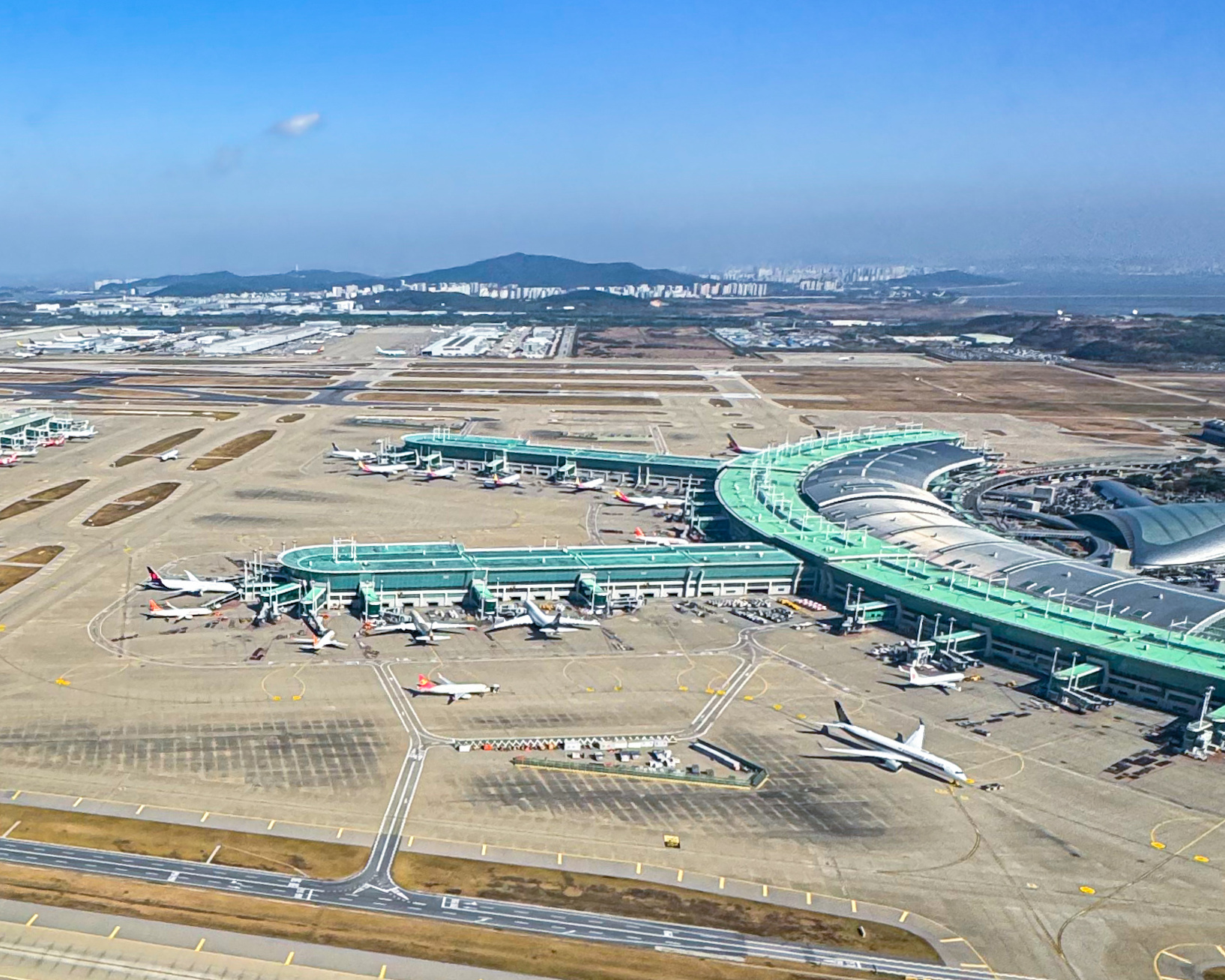
Incheon International Airport in November 2023, with departure gates radiating out from the terminal building, aerobridges, apron and parked planes

An international airport may be a marketing term and can be an airport with customs and border control facilities, enabling passengers to travel between countries around the world. International airports are usually larger than domestic airports, and feature longer runways and have facilities to accommodate heavier aircraft such as the Boeing 747, Boeing 777, and the Airbus A380 commonly used for international and intercontinental travel. International airports often host domestic flights, which helps feed both passengers and cargo into international ones (and vice versa).

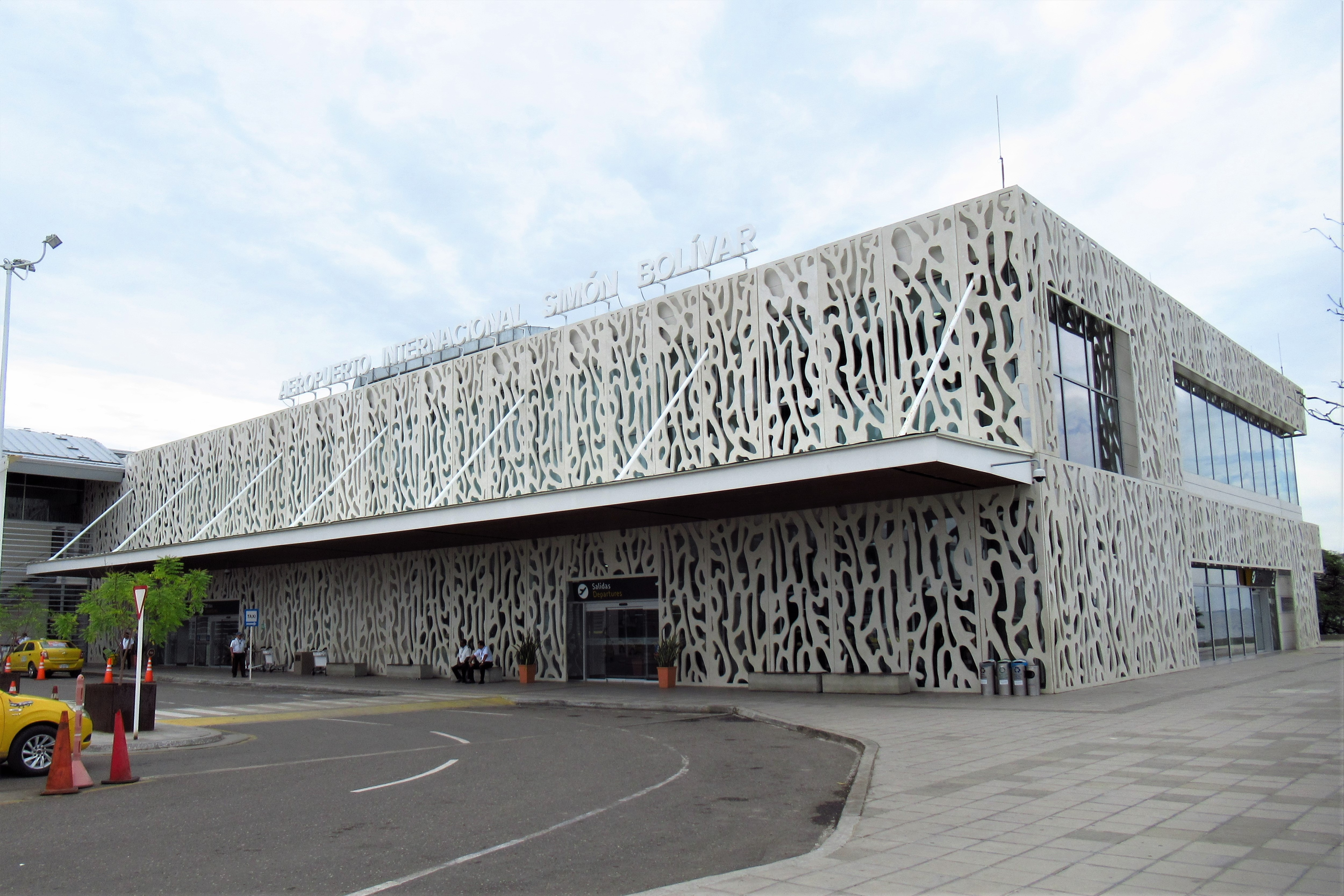
Renovated Simón Bolívar International Airport (Santa Marta, Colombia) in October 2019

Buildings, operations, and management have become increasingly sophisticated since the mid-20th century, when international airports began to provide infrastructure for international civilian flights. Detailed technical standards have been developed to ensure safety and common coding systems have been implemented to provide global consistency. The physical structures that serve millions of individual passengers and flights are among the most complex and interconnected in the world. By the second decade of the 21st century, over 1,200 international airports existed with around 3.8 billion international passengers as of January 2023 along with 50 million metric tonnes of cargo passing through them annually.

== History ==
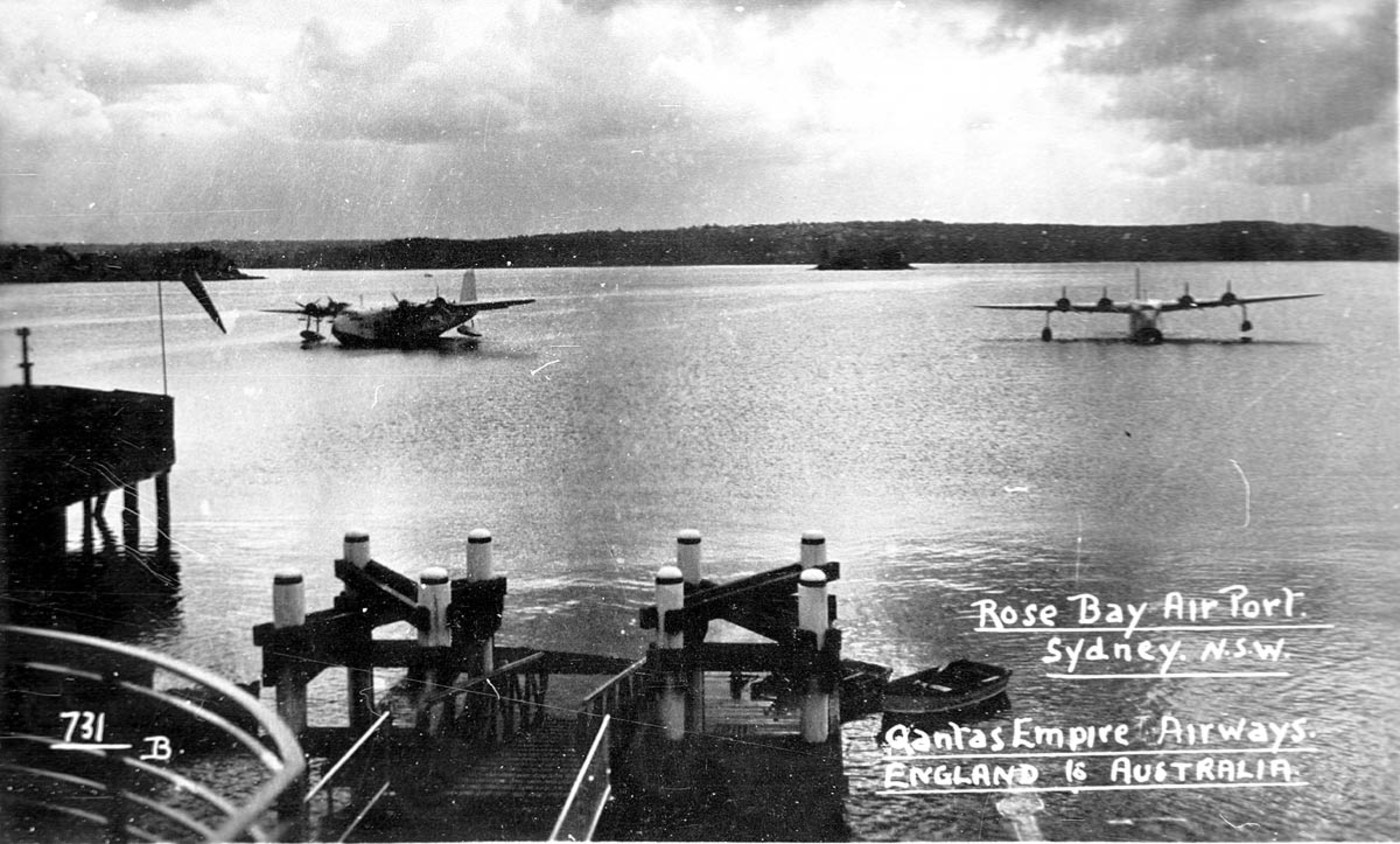
Qantas Empire Airways International Short Empire flying boat services arriving at Rose Bay, Sydney (c. 1939)

In August 1919, Hounslow Heath Aerodrome, in London, England, was the first airport to operate scheduled international commercial services. It was closed and supplanted by Croydon Airport in March 1920. In the United States, Douglas Municipal Airport in Arizona became the first international airport of the Americas in 1928.

The precursors to international airports were airfields or aerodromes. In the early days of international flights, infrastructure was limited, "although if engine problems arose there were plenty of places where aircraft could land". Since four-engined land planes were unavailable for over-water operations to international destinations, flying boats became part of the solution. At the far end of the longest international route (which became the Kangaroo Route), on-water landing areas were found in places such as Surabaya and in the open sea off Kupang. In Sydney, Rose Bay, New South Wales, was chosen as the flying-boat landing area.

International airports sometimes serve military as well as commercial purposes and their viability is also affected by technological developments. Canton Island Airport, for example, in the Phoenix Islands (Kiribati), after serving as a military airport during World War II, was used as a refuelling stop by commercial aircraft such as Qantas which stationed ground crew there in the late 1950s. The advent in the early 1960s of jet aircraft such as the Boeing 707 with the range to fly non-stop between Australia or New Zealand and Hawaii meant that a mid-Pacific stop was no longer needed and the airport was closed to regular commercial use. Other international airports, such as Kai Tak Airport in Hong Kong, have been decommissioned and replaced when they reached capacity or technological advances rendered them inadequate.

== Design and construction ==
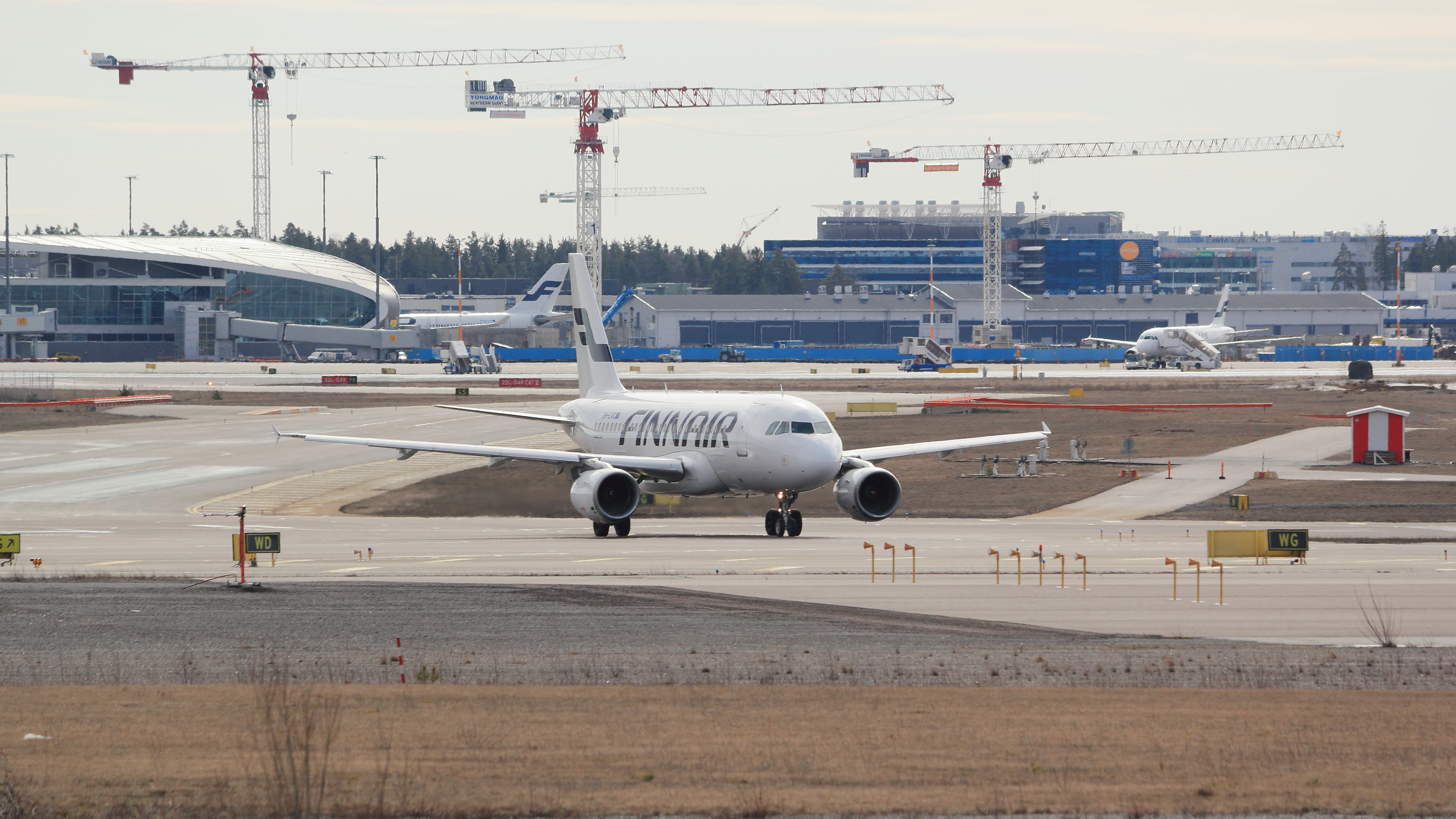
Finnair Airbus A319 at the Helsinki Airport in Vantaa, Finland. Terminal expansion construction site in the background.

The construction and operation of an international airport depends on a complicated set of decisions that are affected by technology, politics, economics and geography as well as both local and international law. Designing an airport even for domestic traffic or as "non-hub" has, from the beginning, required extensive coordination between users and interested parties – architects, engineers, managers and staff all need to be involved. Airports may also be regarded as emblematic of national pride and so the design may be architecturally ambitious. An example was the planned New Mexico City international airport, intended to replace an airport that has reached capacity.

Airports can be towered or non-towered, depending on air traffic density and available funds. Because of high capacity and busy airspace, many international airports have air traffic control located on site.

Some international airports require construction of additional infrastructure outside of the airport, such as at the Hong Kong International Airport, which included the construction of a high-speed railway and automobile expressway to connect the airport to the urban areas of Hong Kong. Construction of the expressway included the construction of two bridges (the Tsing Ma suspension bridge and Kap Shui Mun cable bridge) and the Ma Wan viaduct on Ma Wan island to connect the bridges. Each bridge carries rail and automobile traffic.

== Operations and management ==
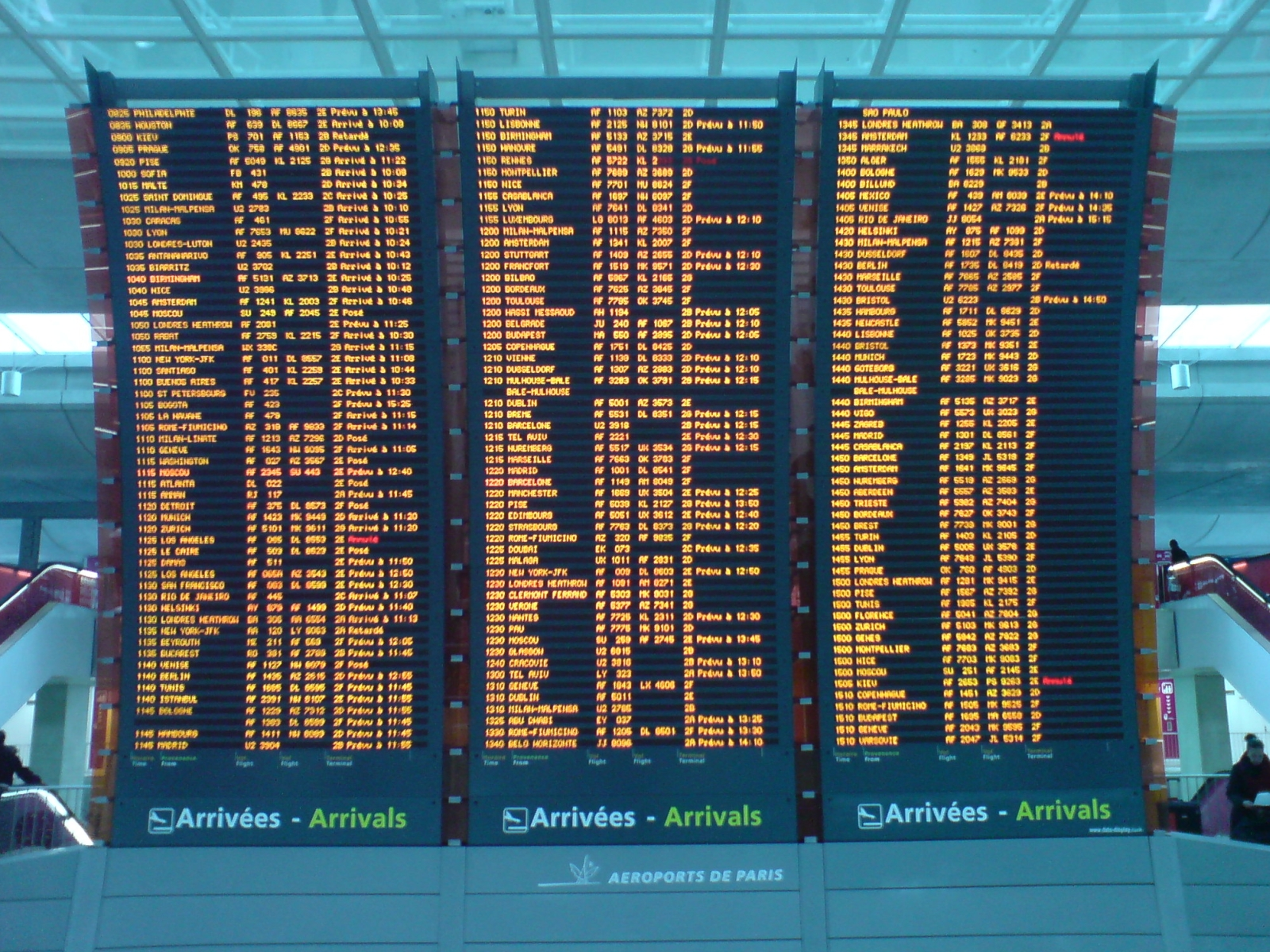
A flight information display system screen at Charles de Gaulle Airport's Terminal 2 showing flight arrivals

International airports have commercial relationships with and provide services to airlines and passengers from around the world. Many also serve as hubs, or places where non-direct flights may land and passengers may switch planes, while others serve primarily direct point-to-point flights. This affects airport design factors, including the number and placement of terminals as well as the flow of passengers and baggage between different areas of the airport. An airport specializing in point-to-point transit can have international and domestic terminals, each in its separate building equipped with separate baggage handling facilities. In a hub airport, however, spaces and services are shared.

Airport management has to take into account a wide range of factors, among which are the performance of airlines, the technical requirements of aircraft, airport-airline relationships, services for travelling customers, security and environmental impacts.

=== Standards ===
Technical standards for safety and operating procedures at international airports are set by international agreements. The International Air Transport Association (IATA), formed in 1945, is the association of airline companies. The International Civil Aviation Organization (ICAO) is a body of the United Nations succeeding earlier international committees going back to 1903. These two organizations served to create regulations over airports which the airports themselves had no authority to debate. This eventually sparked an entire subject of air travel politics. In January 1948, 19 representatives from various US commercial airports met for the first time in New York City to seek a resolution to common problems they each faced, which initiated the formation of the Airport Operators Council, which later became Airports Council International – North America (ACI-NA). This group included representatives from Baltimore, Boston, Chicago, Cleveland, Dallas, Denver, Detroit, Jacksonville, Kansas City, Los Angeles, Memphis, Miami, Minneapolis-Saint Paul, New York, Philadelphia, Pittsburgh, St. Louis, San Francisco and Washington.

=== Flight logistics ===
International airports have extensive operations in managing flight logistics, such as air traffic control. The latter service is provided by ground-based controllers who coordinate and direct aircraft on the ground and through controlled airspace. Air traffic control also provides advisory services to aircraft in non-controlled airspace.

=== Customs and immigration ===
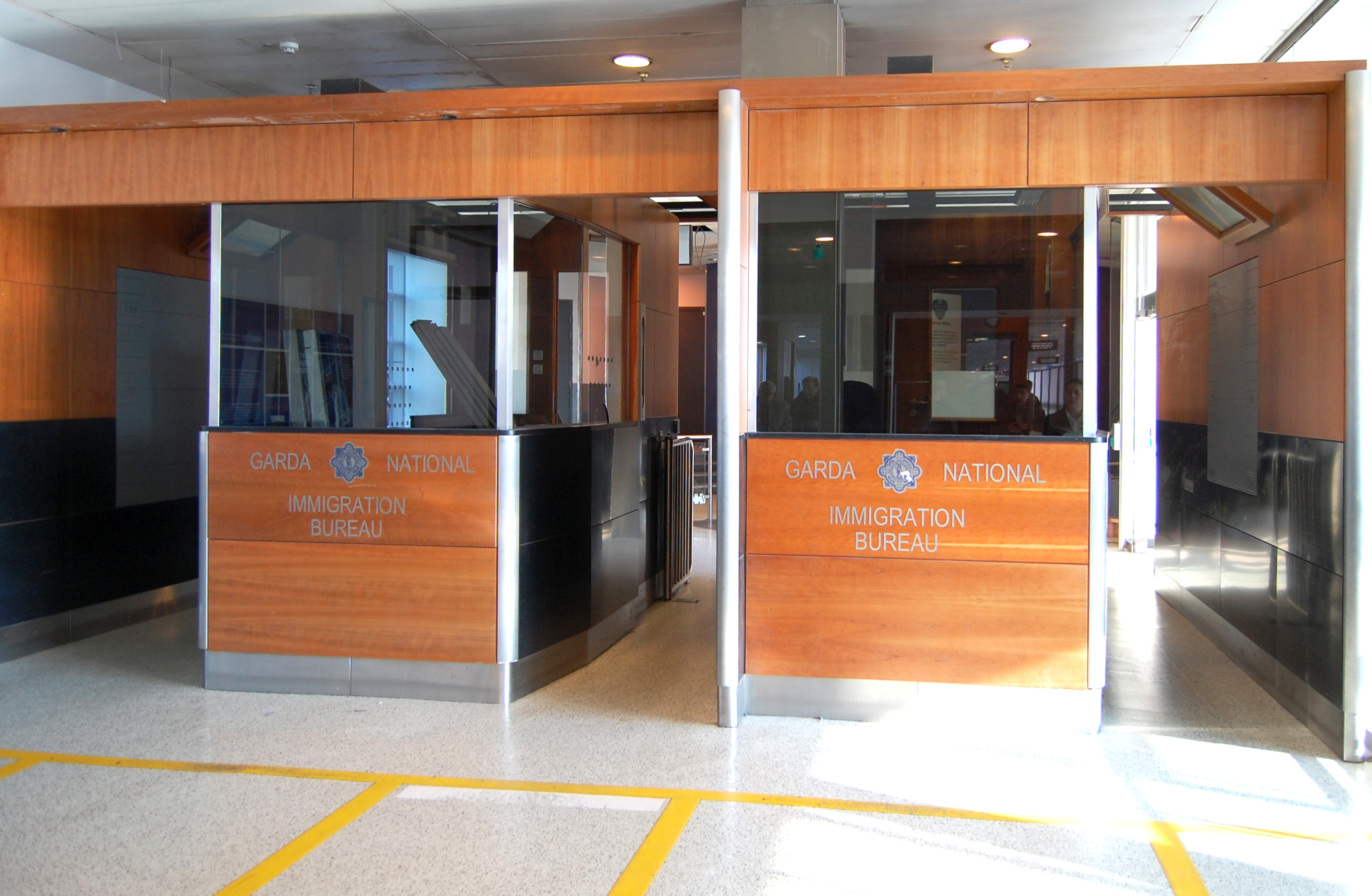
Irish Passport inspection at Dublin Airport (2007)

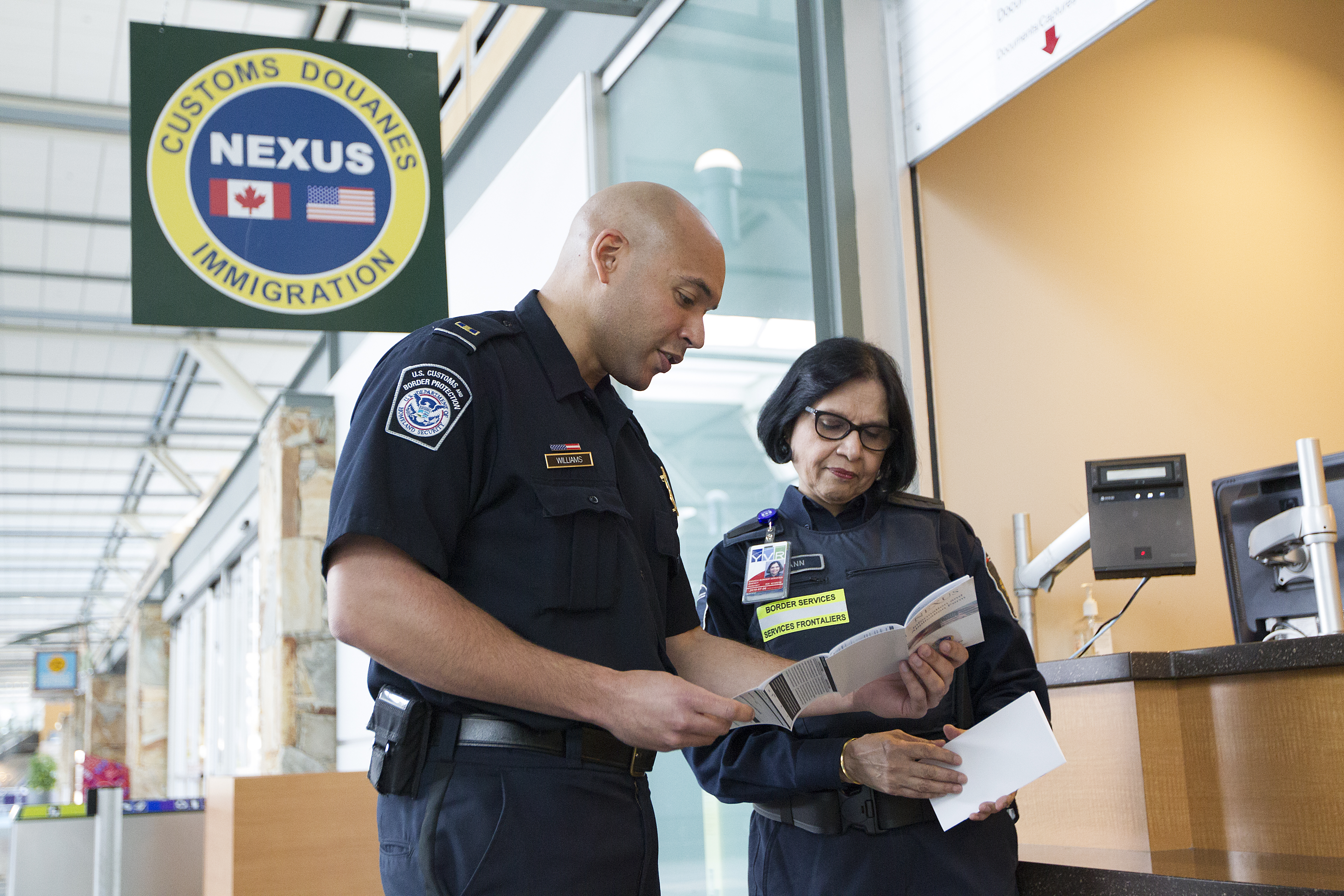
US and Canadian custom agents

Airports with international flights have customs and immigration facilities, which allow right of entry. These change over time but are generally designated by law. However, as some countries have agreements that allow connecting flights without customs and immigration, such facilities do not define an international airport.

=== Security and safety ===
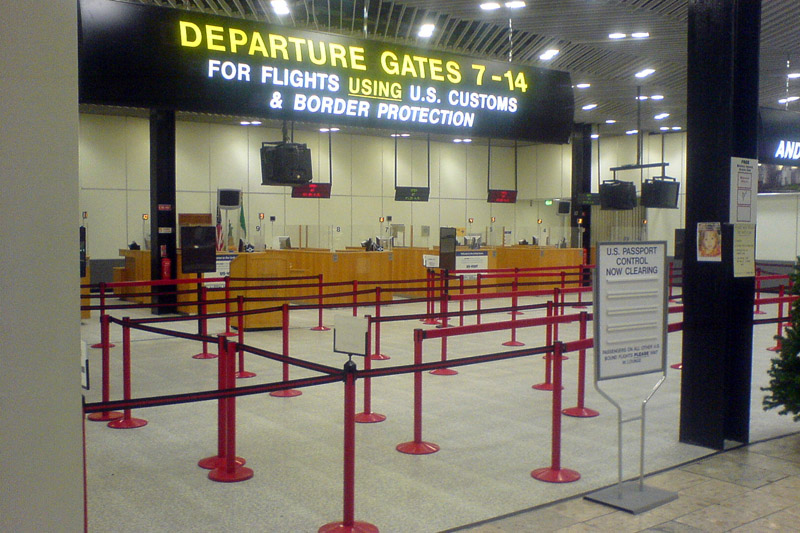
At Shannon Airport, travelers to the United States can "pre-clear" U.S. immigration (2008)

The current trend of enhancing security at the cost of passenger and baggage handling efficiency at international airports is expected to continue in the future. This places financial burden on airports, risks the flow of servicing processes, and has implications for the privacy of passengers. International flights often require a higher level of physical security than domestic airports do, although in recent years, many countries have adopted the same level of security for both.

Most international airports feature a "sterile lounge", an area after security checkpoints within which passengers are free to move without further security checks. This area can have services such as duty-free shops that sell goods that have been selected and screened with safety in mind, so that purchasing and bringing them on board flights poses no security risks. In addition to employees, only processed passengers with a valid ticket are allowed inside the sterile lounge. Admittance into the sterile area is done in centralized security checkpoints in contrast to e.g. individual checkpoints at each gate. This allows for more efficient processing of passengers with fewer staff, as well as makes it possible to detect both delays and security threats well ahead of boarding.

To ensure the viability of airport operations, new and innovative security systems are being developed. For instance, the old security checkpoints can be replaced by a "total security area" encompassing an entire airport, coupled with automatic surveillance of passengers from the moment they enter the airport until they embark on a plane.

Passengers connecting to domestic flights from an international flight generally must take their checked luggage through customs and re-check their luggage at the domestic airline counter, requiring extra time in the process. In some cases in Europe, luggage can be transferred to the final destination even if it is a domestic connection.

In some cases, travelers and the aircraft can clear customs and immigration at the departure airport. An example of this would be that some airports in Canada and Ireland, along with several other countries, have United States border preclearance facilities. This allows flights from those airports to fly into US airports that do not have customs and immigration facilities. Luggage from such flights can also be transferred to a final destination in the U.S. through the airport of entry.

A crucial safety aspect of international airports is medical facilities and practices. In particular, controlling transmissible disease, such as SARS, is deemed important at international airports. While these standards are regulated by ICAO Standards And Recommended Practices (SARPs) and WHO's International Health Regulations (IHR), local authorities have considerable say in how they are implemented.

=== Transportation ===
Among the most important airport services are further transportation connections, including rail networks, taxi and shuttle services at curbside pick-up areas, and public buses. Large areas for automobile parking, often in co-located multi-storey car parks, are also typical to find at airports. Some airports provide shuttle services to parking garages for passengers and airport employees. Due to the very large scale of international airports, some have constructed shuttle services to transport passengers between terminals. Such systems operate for example, in Singapore Changi Airport and Zurich Airport.

At some U.S. international airports, such as O'Hare International Airport in Chicago, some seating and waiting areas are located away from the terminal building, with passengers being shuttled to terminals. These areas may be referred to as ground transportation centers or intermodal centers. Amenities at ground transportation centers typically include restrooms and seating, and may also provide ticket counters, food and beverage sales and retail goods such as magazines. Some ground transportation centers have heating and air conditioning and covered boarding areas (to protect passengers from the elements).

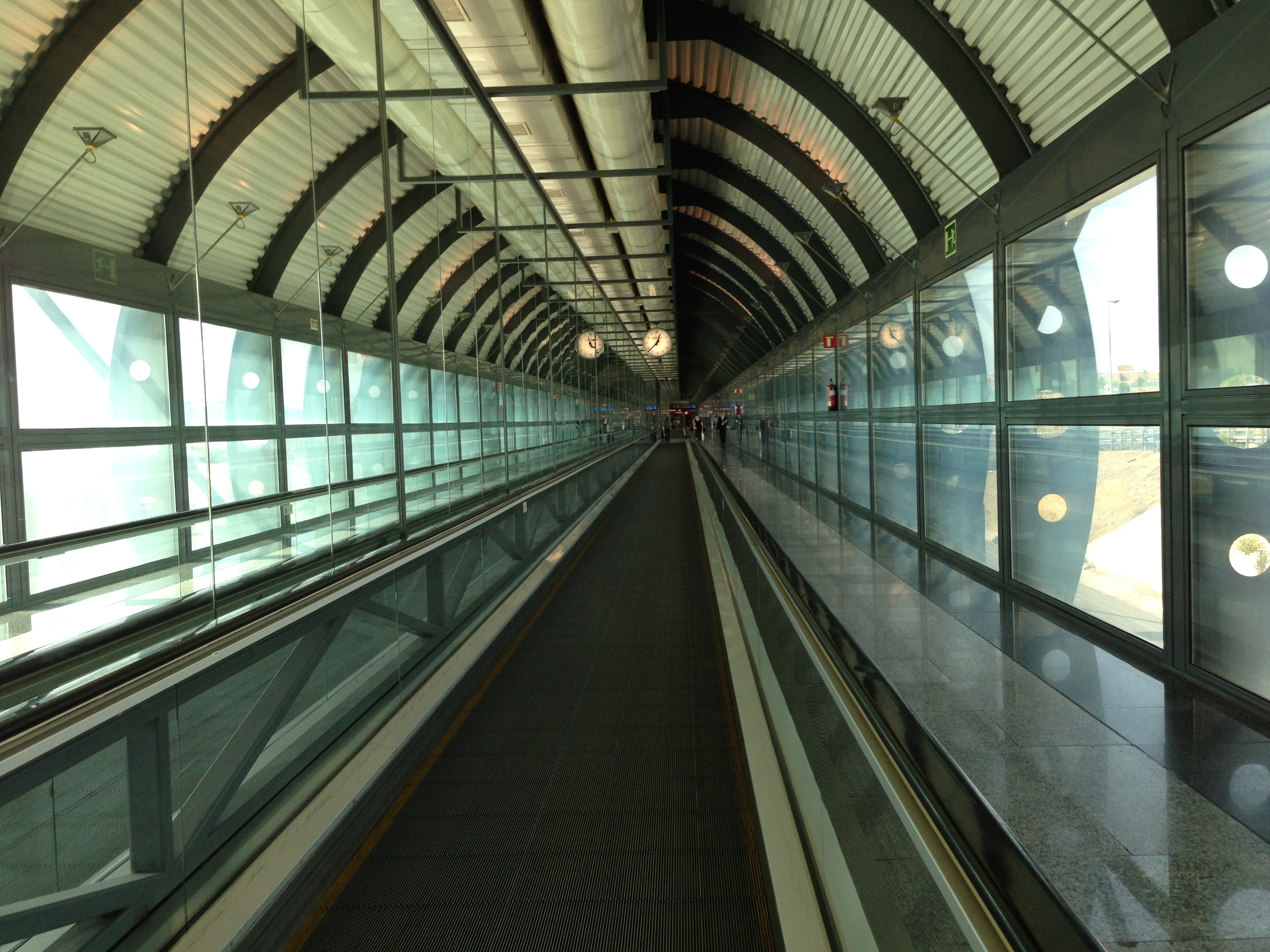
An internal motorized moving footway to transport passengers within Adolfo Suárez Madrid–Barajas Airport, Spain

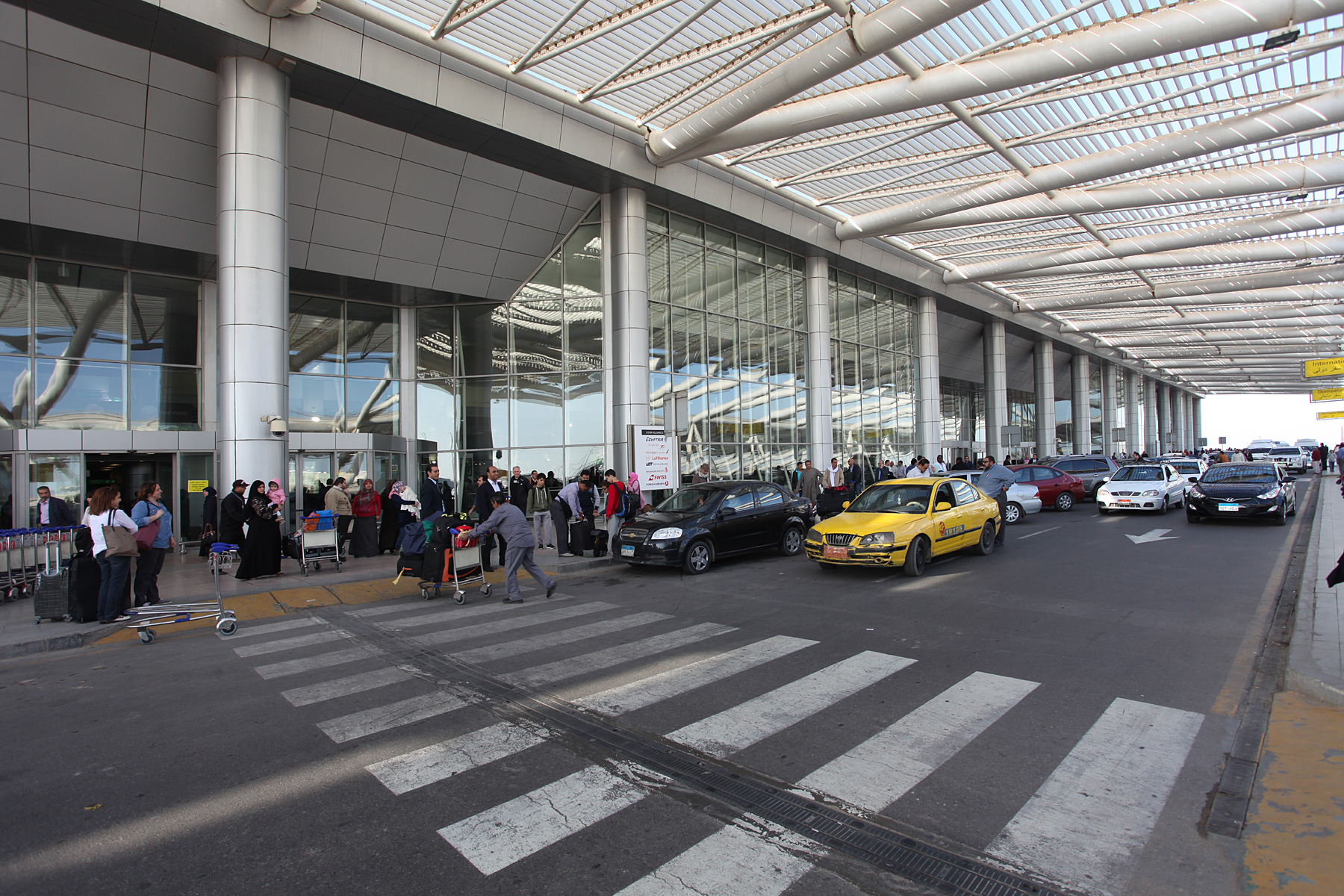
Curbside passenger pick up area at Terminal 3 Cairo International Airport, Egypt

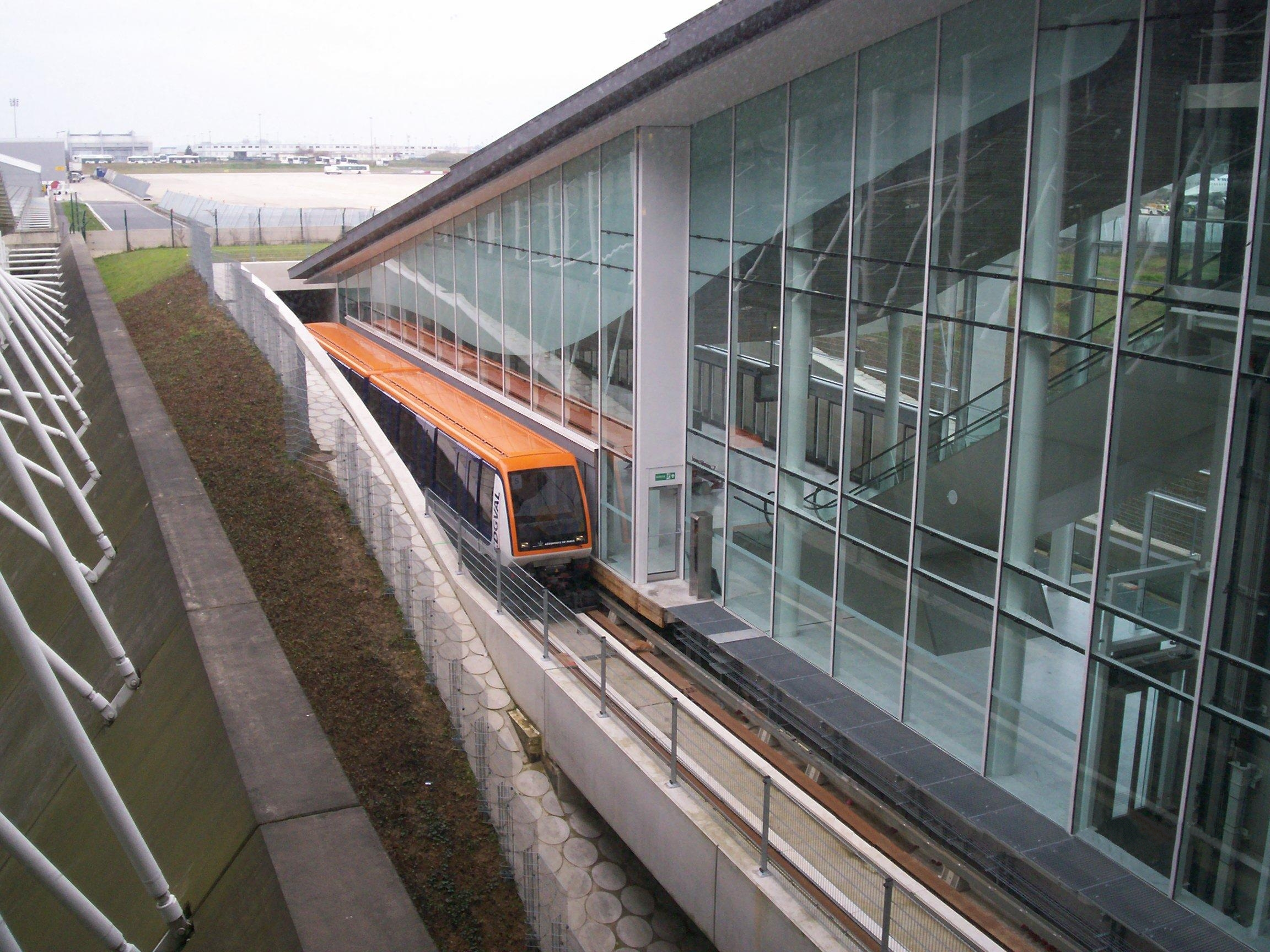
Rail service at Terminal 2 of Charles de Gaulle Airport in France

=== Services and amenities ===
Standard amenities include public restrooms, passenger waiting areas and retail stores for dining and shopping, including duty-free shops. Dining establishments may be consolidated in food courts. Some international airports may offer retail sales of luxury goods at duty-free stores. Wi-Fi service and access, offices for bureau de change (currency exchange) and tourism advice are common, although the availability of service varies across airports. Some international airports provide secure areas for stranded passengers to rest and sleep. The more usual service is hotels that are available on the premises.

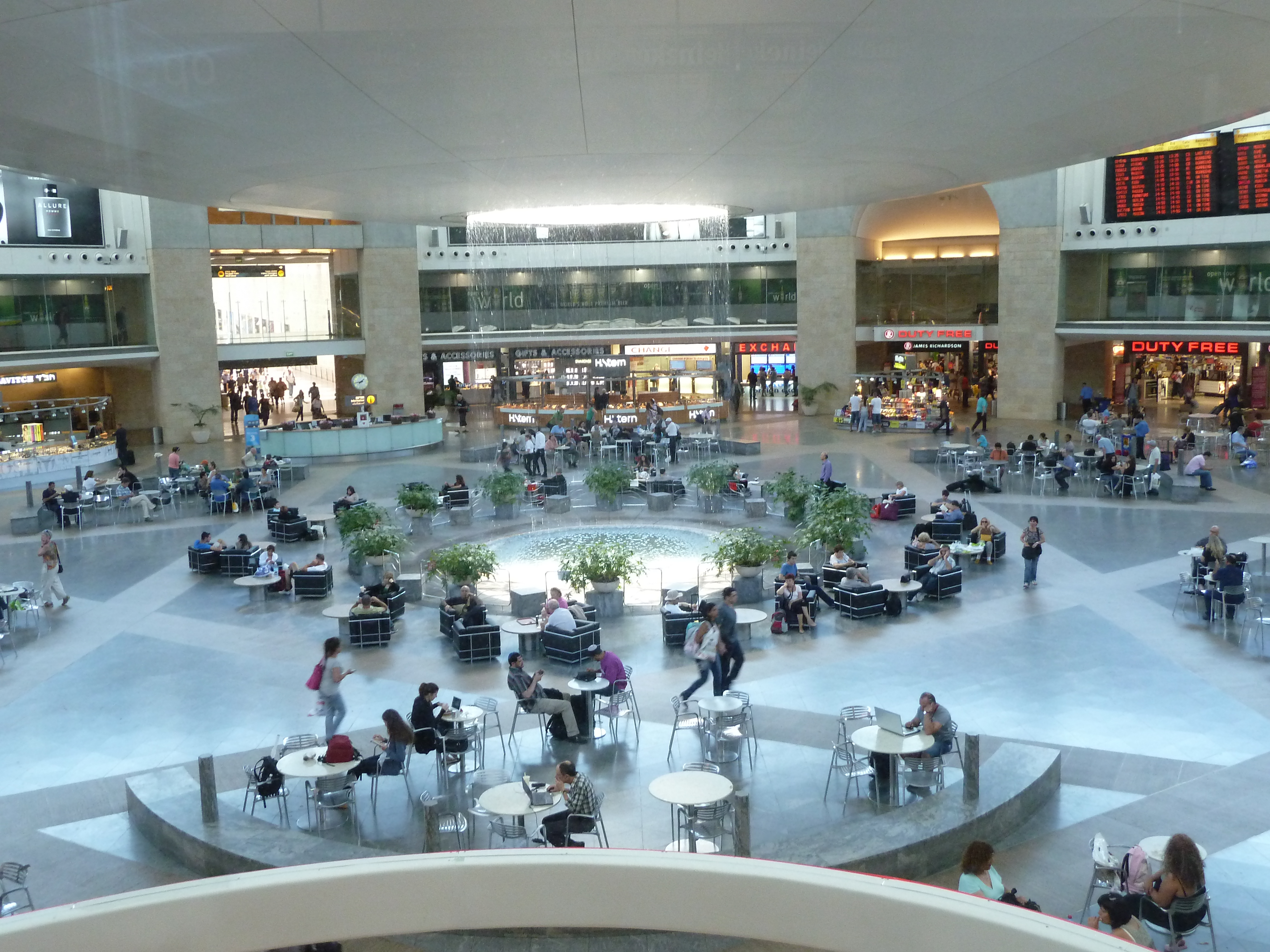
Duty-free shops at Ben Gurion International Airport in Tel Aviv, Israel (2012)

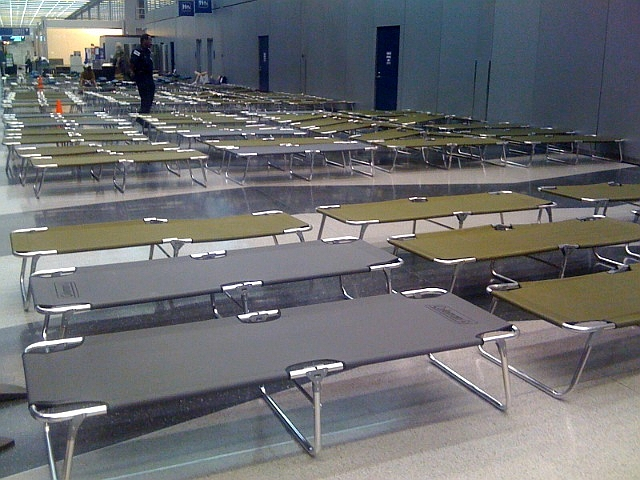
For passengers stranded overnight, secure area at O'Hare International Airport with dimmed lights, cots, pillows, blankets, and toiletries (2008)

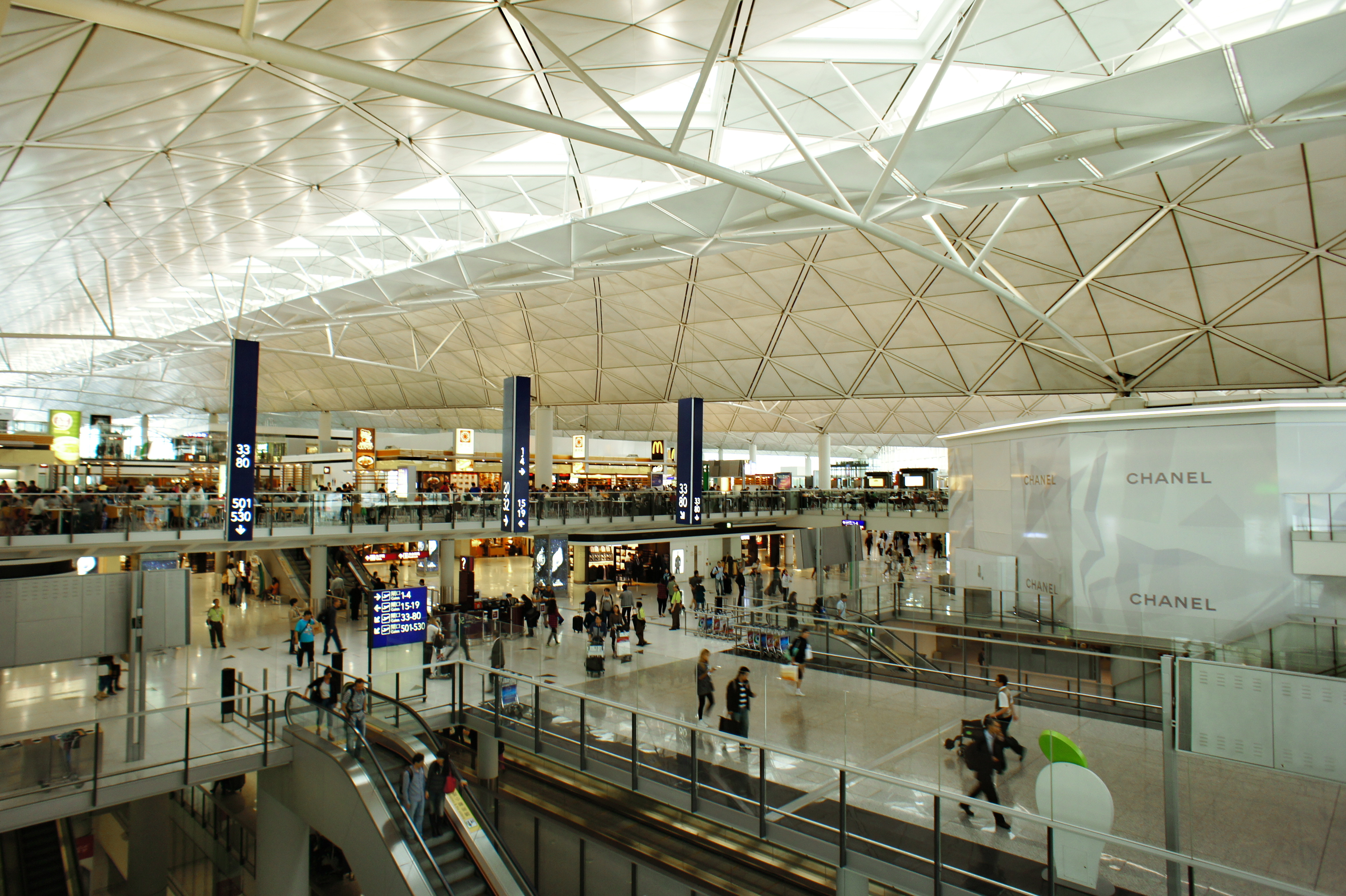
The food court in the restricted area of Terminal 1 at Hong Kong International Airport (2013)

==== Customer satisfaction awards ====
The World Airport Awards are voted on by consumers in an independent global customer satisfaction survey. Singapore Changi Airport was the first-place winner in 2020. Other winners include Incheon International Airport (South Korea) and Amsterdam Airport Schiphol (The Netherlands).

== Airport names ==
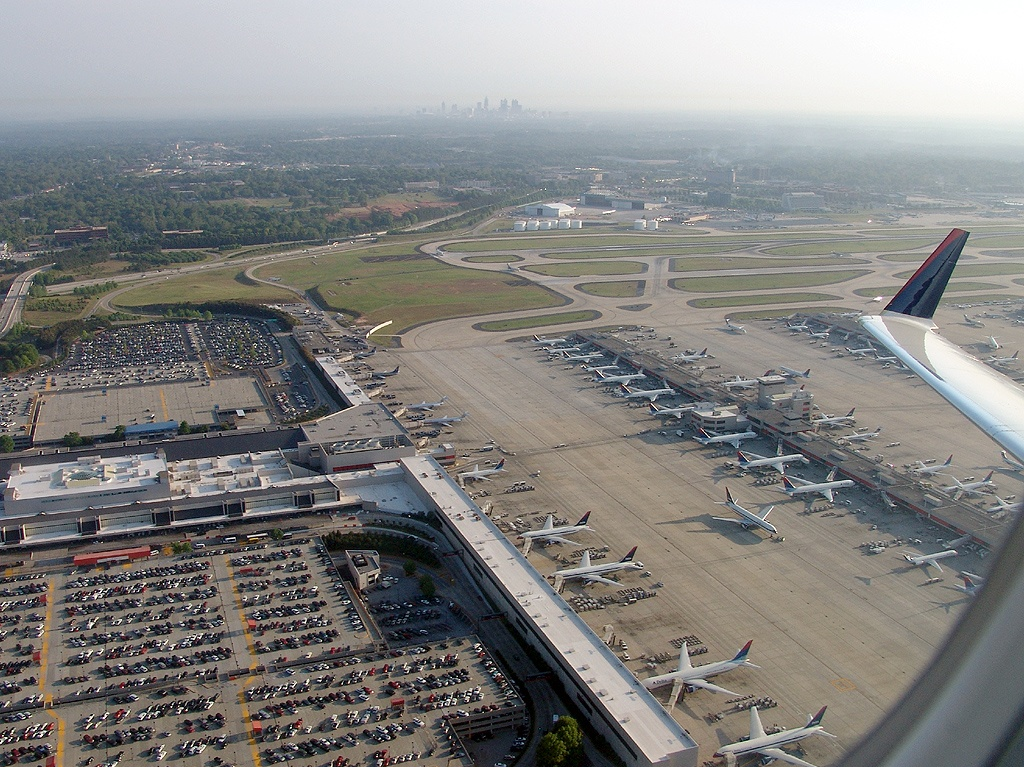
Birds-eye view of Hartsfield-Jackson Atlanta International Airport in October 2004.

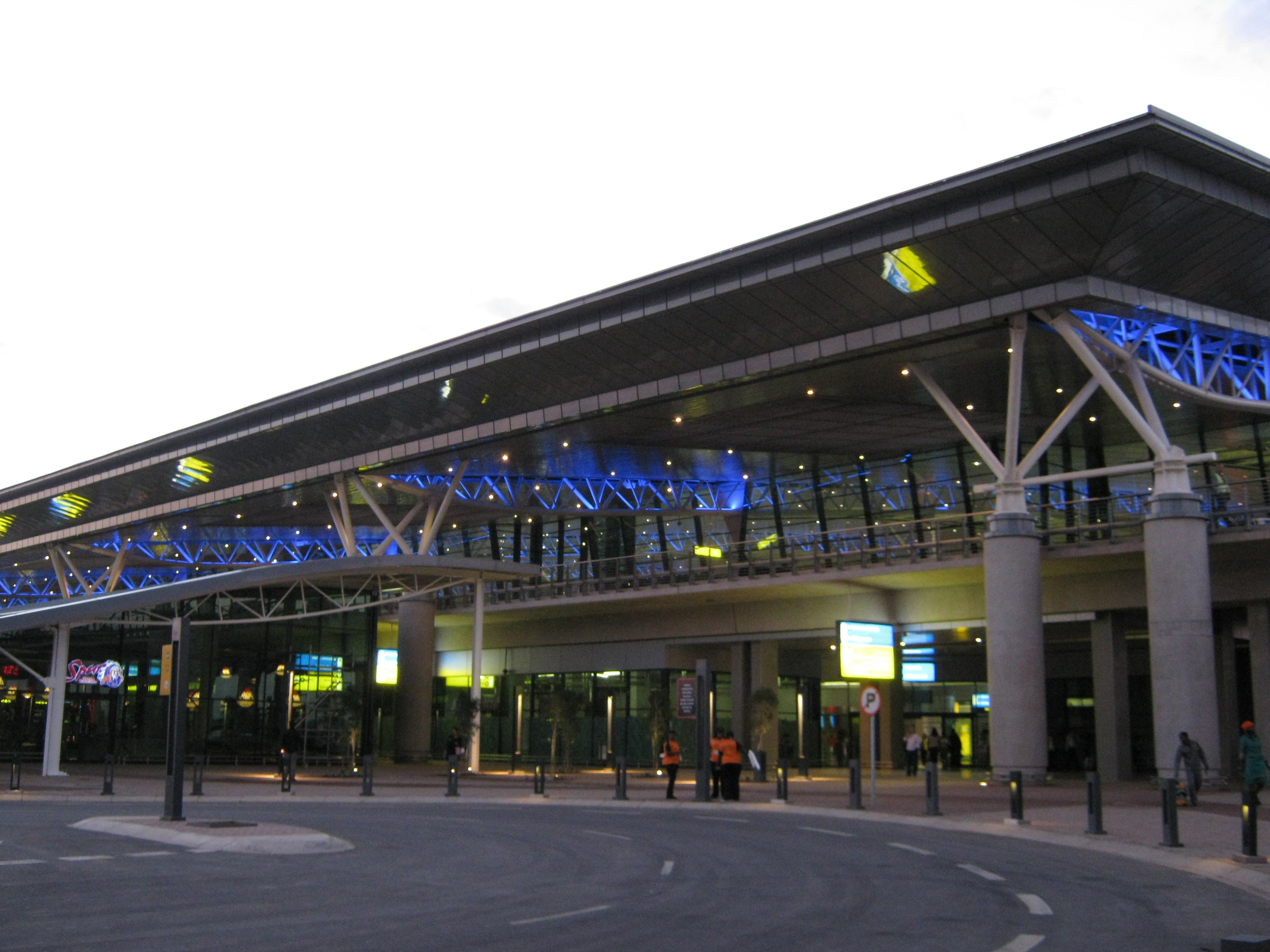
The front view of the King Shaka International Airport's main terminal building in May 2010.

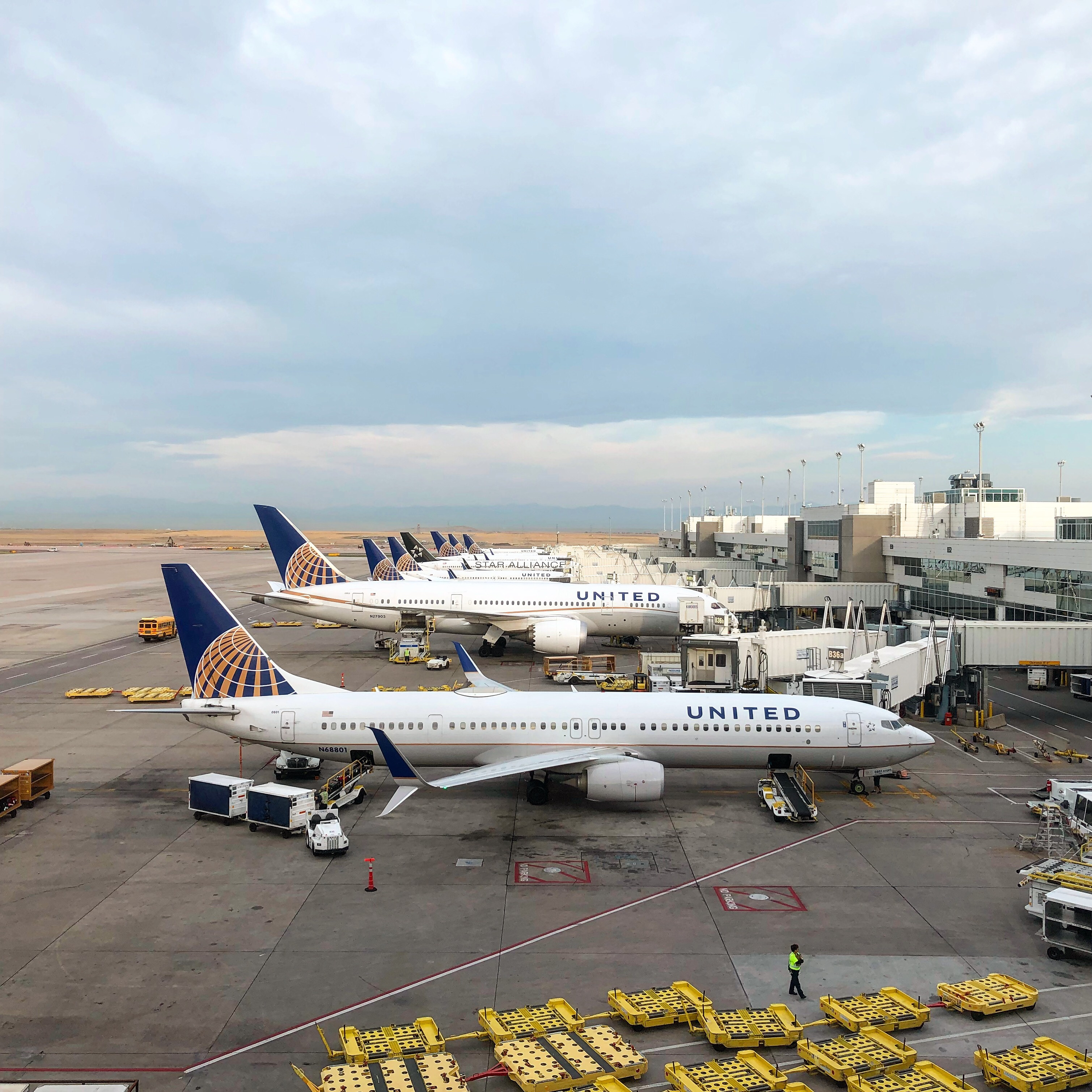
Outside view of Terminal B of Denver International Airport in July 2018.

Toponymy is one of the most common sources for the naming of airports. A number of areas close to them have lent their names, including villages, estates, city districts, historical areas and regions, islands and even a waterfall. Sometimes the toponym is combined with or renamed to incorporate another name from another source such as one of the following:

- Athletes such as George Best Belfast City Airport in Belfast, Northern Ireland.
- Aviators such as pilots (civil and military) and others who played a role in the development of aviation- like Jorge Chavez International Airport in Lima, Peru, named after Peruvian-French pilot Jorge Chavez, Sydney Kingsford Smith Airport, named after Australian aviator Charles Kingsford Smith, or Sabiha Gökçen International Airport named after Turkish Female Pilot Sabiha Gökçen
- Military heros such as Lt. O'Hare (O'Hare International Airport) or Lt. Baer as in Baer Field, now Fort Wayne International Airport.
- Cultural leaders (poets, artists, writers, musicians) - like the John Lennon Airport in the English city of Liverpool, where John Lennon and The Beatles came from, Rafael Hernandez Airport in Aguadilla, Puerto Rico, named for Puerto Rican singer and actor Rafael Hernandez, and Louis Armstrong New Orleans International Airport in New Orleans, Louisiana, named for jazz artist Louis Armstrong.
- Ethnic groups, such as Minangkabau International Airport in Padang, Indonesia, named after the local Minangkabau people.
- Ideals in combination with toponyms, such as Newark Liberty International Airport.
- Mythology and religion, such as heroes of epics and myths, church hierarchs and saints and similar names. A notable example of this is El Dorado International Airport.
- Politicians and statesmen such as the O. R. Tambo International Airport in Johannesburg, South Africa which was named after O.R. Tambo who was a South African anti-apartheid politician and Ninoy Aquino International Airport in Manila, Philippines to honour the former Senator of the Philippines, Ninoy Aquino who was assassinated at the exact airport in 1983. Some airports have been named after dictators during their dictatorship; such is the case of the Robert Mugabe International Airport in Harare, Zimbabwe, named after Robert Mugabe, and, in the past Saddam International Airport in Baghdad, Iraq, so named after Saddam Hussein. Some airports were formerly International, for example Atatürk International Airport, named after the founding father of Turkey, Mustafa Kemal Atatürk. More notable examples are two of the three New York City airports: LaGuardia Airport (named after Mayor Fiorello LaGuardia) and John F. Kennedy International Airport (named after the 35th President of the United States). In addition, the world's busiest airport, Hartsfield-Jackson Atlanta International Airport, was named after two former mayors: William B. Hartsfield and Maynard Jackson.
- Public figures (advocates, engineers, doctors, teachers, journalists or sportspeople), such as John Wayne Airport, named after an actor.
- Royalty (kings, queens) such as King Shaka International Airport in Durban, South Africa which was named after King Shaka who was one of the most influential monarchs of the Zulu Kingdom. Chhatrapati Shivaji Maharaj International Airport in Mumbai, India, is named after Chhatrapati Shivaji Maharaj, the leader of the Maratha empire from 1674 to 1680.
- Scientists such as Galileo Galilei Airport in Pisa which was named after Galileo Galilei.

A study found that 44 percent of the world's international airports are named by toponyms: named for politicians (thirty percent), aviators (seven percent), mythology and religion (three percent), public figures (two percent), people of science (two percent) and others (one percent).

Airports also use a IATA-3 letter code for identification. Some airports are nicknamed after these codes, such as JFK, BWI, DFW, LAX, YYZ, FCO, and CDG.

An "international airport" can be named as such by providing customs and border control facilities to enable international flights, regardless of whether international flights currently operate to or from the airport. For example, a U.S. Customs and Border Protection facility has been in place at Bozeman Yellowstone International Airport since July 1, 2012, but no scheduled international flights have been inaugurated to or from Bozeman since.

== Notable airports ==
=== By historical event ===
- 1919 (August) Hounslow Heath Aerodrome begins operating scheduled international commercial services from England to France.
- 1933 Douglas International Airport in Arizona is honored by Eleanor Roosevelt as "the first international airport of the Americas", having reached this capacity in 1928.

=== By passenger numbers ===
- As of 2018, Hartsfield–Jackson Atlanta International Airport had the greatest number of travelers of all international airports with 107 million passengers, more than Beijing Capital International with 100 million passengers.
- Los Angeles International Airport is considered to have the greatest number of passengers who start or end their travel there as opposed to continuing to a connecting flight. Overall, LAX is considered to be the 7th busiest airport in the world.
- Dubai International Airport is the busiest airport in the world by international passenger traffic, with 83,105,798 international passengers. Dubai is the third busiest airport worldwide.

=== Other ===
- Svalbard Airport in Svalbard, Norway is the northernmost airport to which tourists can book tickets. It is primarily used for transporting miners to and from a cluster of islands with a heavy mining industry.
- King Fahd International Airport in Dammam, Saudi Arabia is the largest airport in the world, encompassing over 300 square miles (780 km^{2}).
- The world's longest active scheduled passenger flight by great-circle distance operates between Changi Airport (in Singapore) and John F. Kennedy International Airport (in New York City, United States); the great-circle distance between the two airports is 15,349 kilometres (9,537 mi; 8,288 nmi).
- Singapore Changi Airport recently got the “Most Awarded Airport” award

== See also ==
- List of busiest airports by aircraft movements
- List of busiest airports by cargo traffic
- List of busiest airports by passenger traffic
- List of the busiest airports
- List of the busiest airports in Europe
- List of the busiest airports in the Nordic countries
- List of international airports by country
