= Scicchitano =

Scicchitano (pronounced [ʃikkiˈtaːno]) is an Italian surname from Catanzaro. Notable people with the surname include:

- Andrea Scicchitano (born 1992), Italian football player
- Filippo Scicchitano (born 1993), Italian actor

== See also ==
- Sciacchitano
