= Walter Binaghi =

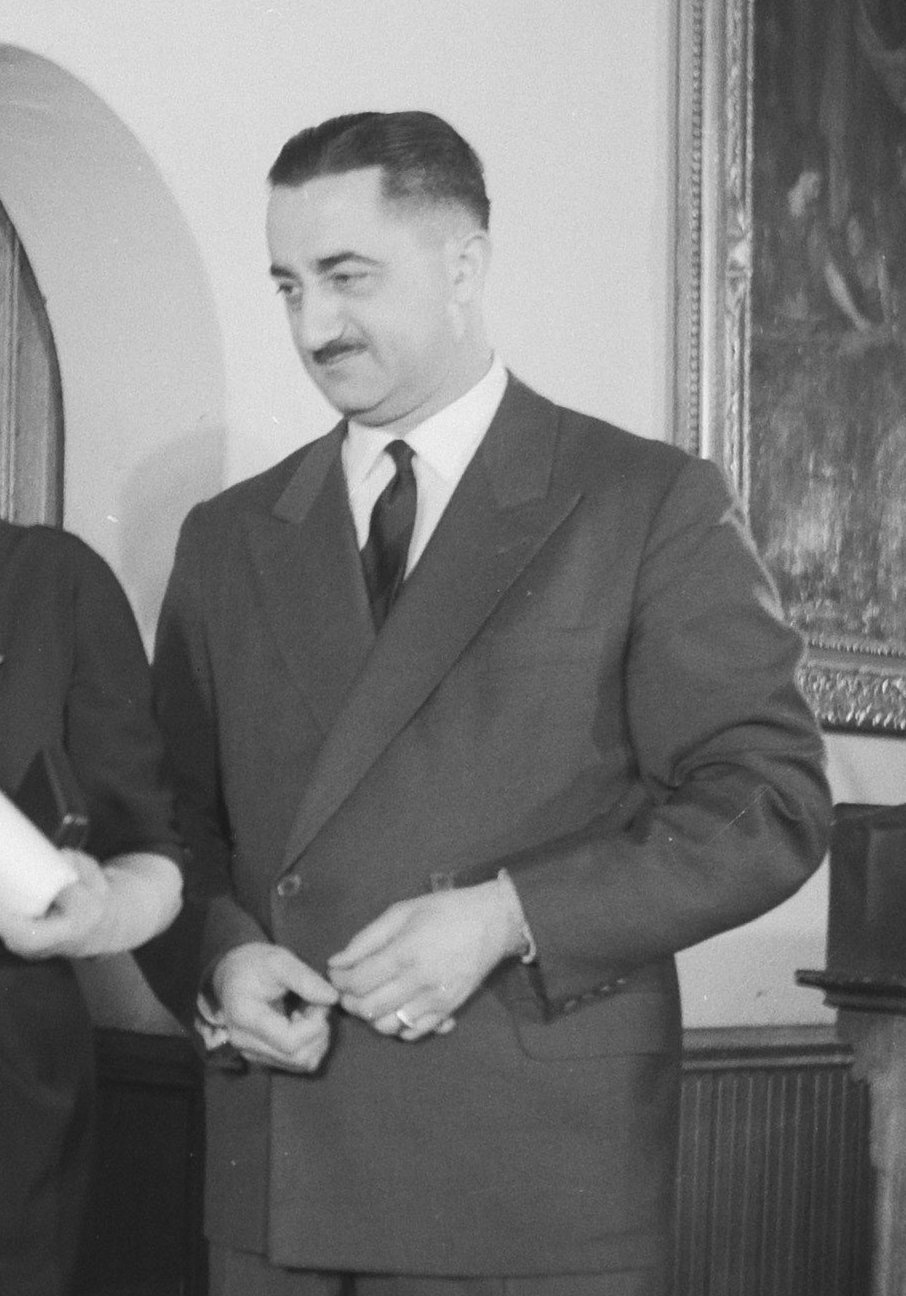
Walter Binaghi (1960)

Walter Binaghi (13 July 1919, Buenos Aires - 16 July 2006) was Council President of the International Civil Aviation Organization ICAO from 1957 when he was unanimously elected to that post, serving until his retirement in 1976 when he was succeeded by Assad Kotaite.

Until 1947, Binaghi had two careers – one in teaching as a professor of Physics and Mathematics and one in aviation as an engineer in the Directorate of Infrastructure, Ministry of Aeronautics. Binaghi was a member of the Argentine Delegation to the First Assembly of ICAO, held in Montreal in May 1947. In September he was sent to Montreal to be part of the Argentine Delegation to ICAO and became a member of the Air Navigation Commission. He became Chairman of the Air Navigation Commission in February 1949 and was annually re-elected in that capacity until he assumed the position of President of the Council in April 1957. From 1944 until 1957, Binaghi attended every ICAO Assembly, first as an Argentine Delegate and subsequently as President of the Council. He served as President of the Eighth, Seventeenth (Extraordinary) and Twenty-first Sessions of the Assembly.

At the fourth meeting of its Thirtieth Session on 20 February 1957, the Council of ICAO unanimously elected Walter Binaghi as its President. He retired on 31 July 1976, having served for nearly 29 years at ICAO, the last 19 of which were as President of the Council.

Binaghi died on 16 July 2006 at the age of 87.
