= International Aviation Services Organization =

International nonprofit aviation service industry forum

The International Aviation Services Organization (IASO) is a global nonprofit professional industry forum for airport and aviation service providers. The organization acts as a parent association for all aviation service organizations worldwide, consulting on issues and developing best-practice policies for the entire industry. The IASO aims to address key issues impacting the air freight and logistics sectors, as well as other aviation practices.

The IASO collaborates with various international members of the aviation service industry, implementing ideal business practices and ensuring credible representation for all IASO industry members. The organization’s headquarters are located in Geneva, Switzerland, a city that lies at the southern tip of Lac Léman (Lake Geneva).

IASO is distinct from other international air organizations, but it does link with established associations like the International Civil Aviation Organization (ICAO), a UN specialized agency; the International Air Transport Association (IATA), a trade association; and the Middle East and North Africa Business Aviation Association (MEBAA), a business aviation forum.

== History ==
The IASO was established by founder and Chairman Munir Kahlifeh, cofounder Samir H. Al Asadi, and a board of directors with international experience. It began operations in Dubai in September 2015 to support the interests of aviation services companies all over the world. On May 23, 2016, it was officially registered as a nonprofit organization in Geneva, Switzerland.

In 2019 it was recognised by the International Civil Aviation Organization.

The IASO has five regional offices: Gothenburg, Sweden; Dubai, United Arab Emirates; Montreal, Canada; Orlando, Florida; and Cairo, Egypt.

== Objectives ==
The IASO strives to advance common industry practices, solve challenges, and improve collaboration and mutual understanding between key decision-makers, providers, and other regulators of the aviation services industry. Its goal is to create strong industry representation worldwide and shed light on the benefits of aviation to both national and worldwide economies.

The IASO provides an online database and registry for auditing and measuring key risk factors. This database allows IASO members to meet international safety standards established by the International Air Transport Association (IATA) under its IATA Safety Audit program for Ground Operations (ISAGO). The IASO’s objective is to partner with the IATA, assisting it and other international organizations, such as the International Civil Aviation Organization (ICAO), in meeting their international safety mandates.

== Constituent organizations ==
The IASO contains two sub-organizations: the International Fuel Services Organization (IFSO) and the International Handling Aviation Organization (IHAO). The IHAO acts as a forum for debating the common issues concerning ground operations, and it seeks to improve ground-handling standards globally. IHAO's office is registered in Sweden, but it is headquartered in Dubai. The International Fuel Service Organization (IFSO) is a global association established to represent leading fuel suppliers in the aviation sphere, improving their overall ground performance.

== Board of directors ==
The organization’s board of directors consists of ten members, including Chairman Munir Kahlifeh and Samir H. Al Asadi.

Munir Kahlifeh, the IASO founder, previously contributed to the establishment of Al Shamelah Aviation Services in 2011. He also started its sister company Mixjet AB, which oversees the European market and constituent airlines, in 2012 in Sweden.

Samir H. Al Alsadi, Co-Founder of the IASO, is Executive Director of Mixjet AB, Sweden. He was previously Executive Director of Letsfly's Sweden and France divisions.

Other Directors include Adel Mardini, CEO and President of (Jetex Flight Support); Mohammed Al Husary, Executive President and Co-Founder of (UAS International Trip Support); Omar Hosari, (UAS International Trip Support) Co-Founder and Chief Executive Officer; Roy D Barnett; Capt. Samir Sajet; Chamsou Andjorin; and Mohamed Elamiri.

== Membership ==
IASO members are granted access to a list of revenue-enhancing benefits, including:

- IASO’s Aviation Ground Services Assessment (IAGSA)
- Access to discounted insurance
- Arbitration and dispute resolution
- Risk assessment database
- Business networking

Smaller industry-supply businesses who become IASO members have access to the organization's resources, such as a ground damage reporting tool, audit support, and help gauging fuel-price efficiency. Current members include the UAS International Trip Support, Jetex Flight Support, Nobles Jet, Mixjet Flight Support, and the Middle East Business Aviation (MEBA).
