= Assad Kotaite =

- أسعد قطيط
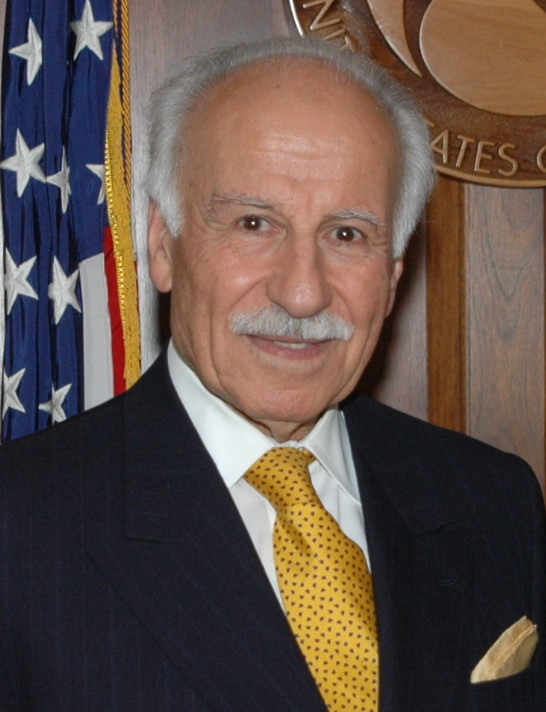
- Kotaite in 2004

Council President of the International Civil Aviation Organization
- In office 1976–2006
- Preceded by: Walter Binaghi
- Succeeded by: Roberto Kobeh González

Assad Kotaite (Arabic: أسعد قطيط) (November 6, 1924 - February 27, 2014), was a Lebanese politician who served as Secretary-General and Council President of the International Civil Aviation Organization from 1976 to 2006.

== Early life ==
Kotaite was born in Hasbaya, Lebanon. In 1948, he graduated from Saint Joseph University (Université Saint-Joseph) in Beirut, Lebanon. In 1952, he earned a doctorate in law from the University of Paris, and continued his education at the university's Institute of Higher International Studies. Furthermore, he graduated from The Hague Academy of International Law, and was elected as President of the Association of Attendees and Alumni of the Hague Academy of International Law in 1952.

== Career ==
Returning to Lebanon in 1953, Kotaite accepted the post of Chief of Legal Services for International Agreements and External Relations at the Lebanese Directorate of Civil Aviation. In 1956, he became Lebanese Representative to the ICAO Council, serving until 1962. From 1963 to 1964, he served as Chief of Administrative Services for the Lebanese Directorate-General of Transport. In 1965, he was reappointed as Lebanese Representative to the ICAO Council serving until his appointment as the fifth Secretary-General of the ICAO in 1970 and served in that post until his appointment as ICAO Council President. From 1976 to 2006, he served as President of the ICAO Council. He was succeeded as Council President by Roberto Kobeh González.

After retiring from active service with the ICAO, Kotaite established the Assad Kotaite Graduate and Postdoctoral Fellowship Fund. This scholarship programme acknowledges the importance of assistance and cooperation in the field of specialized aviation training, with the objective of advancing the safety and development of civil aviation by strengthening the capabilities of national civil aviation personnel.

== Awards and honors ==
- After retirement, Kotaite was named President Emeritus of the International Civil Aviation Organization (ICAO)
- Recipient of the 2005 Philip J. Klass Award for Lifetime Achievement from Aviation Week & Space Technology.
- In September 2013, he received the highest honour in the world of civil aviation, the Edward Warner Award

== Death ==
Kotaite died on 27 February 2014 in Montreal, Quebec, Canada at the age of 89. He had lived in Montreal, where the ICAO headquarters are located since beginning his service with the organization,
