= Latin American Civil Aviation Commission =

Regional international organization

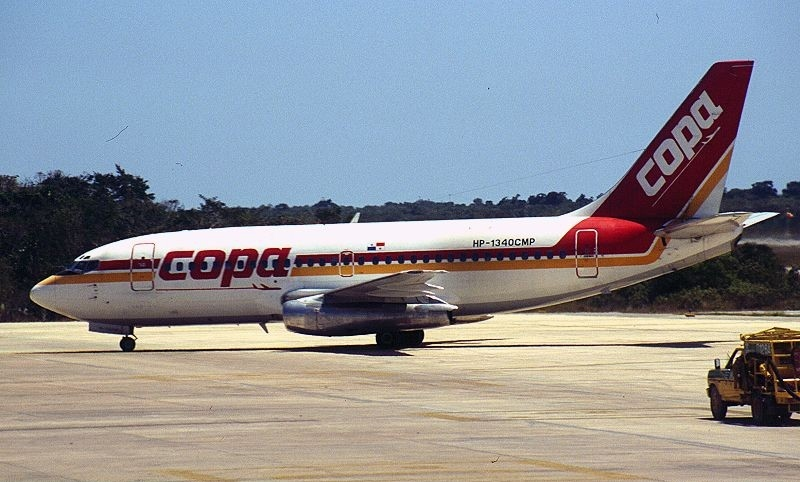
COPA airlines is a Panama-based airline which is directly affected by LACAC's recommendations.

The Latin American Civil Aviation Commission (LACAC) is a regional international organization whose goal is to advise and recommend practices for civilian aviation in Latin America. The organization was formed in 1973 to address the growing market of civil aviation in Latin America. As of 2024, The Latin American Civil Aviation Commission has 22 member states who vote on recommendations made by the commission. LACAC has no regulatory oversight, instead, member states are responsible for implementing recommendations.

== Background ==
In the 1970s Latin American had seen a substantial growth in aviation. Between 1973 and 1976 civilian air traffic in Latin America represented 7% of total passenger-kilometers worldwide. The nations of Latin America needed to implement safe and effective practices to meet this demand. In 1973 the Second Conference of Aeronautical Authorities of Latin America voted to create the commission which began operation in 1975. There were initially 12 member states.

The International Civil Aviation Organization (ICAO) identified Latin America as a location where aviation needed special cooperation in order to facilitate growth in a safe and orderly manner as well as allow for Latin American-based airlines to be competitive.

== Statute ==
The Latin American Civil Aviation Commission statute has 34 articles divided up into 6 chapters.

The statute divides the commission into three bodies, the Executive Committee, the Assembly, and the Secretariat. The Executive Committee conducts research, employs experts, and develops recommendations. The assembly primary votes on whether to officially recommend the executive committees’ findings. The Secretariat is responsible for the daily running of the organization

The assembly meets every two years where the executive committee reports their findings.

LACAC's statute also outlines the responsibility of LACAC to collect data and statistics on civil aviation in Latin America and provide that information to the ICAO.

== Areas of responsibility ==
LACACs primary areas of responsibility are in airport management, operational safety, security, transportation and aviation policy, training and environmental impacts.

== Cooperation ==
LACAC has partnerships with several international organizations and agencies. These are listed as “observers” and function as advisors to the commission. These included other IO’s such as the International Air Transport Association (IATA) and national agencies such as the US’s Federal Aviation Administration (FAA).
