= Standards and Recommended Practices =

International aviation specifications

Standards And Recommended Practices (SARPs) are technical specifications adopted by the Council of the International Civil Aviation Organization (ICAO) in accordance with Article 37 of the Convention on International Civil Aviation in order to achieve "the highest practicable degree of uniformity in regulations, standards, procedures and organization in relation to aircraft, personnel, airways and auxiliary services in all matters in which such uniformity will facilitate and improve air navigation".

SARPs are published by the ICAO in the form of Annexes to Chicago Convention. The Convention stipulates that its Annexes do not have the same binding character as the Convention itself (unlike the 1919 Paris Convention on International Air Navigation, whose Annexes were binding). Moreover States agreed to "undertake to collaborate in securing (...) uniformity", not to "comply with". Each Contracting State may notify the ICAO Council of differences between SARPs and its own regulations and practices. Those differences are published in the form of Supplements to Annexes.

A Standard is defined by the ICAO as "any specification for physical characteristics, configuration, material, performance, personnel or procedure, the uniform application of which is recognized as necessary for the safety or regularity of international air navigation and to which Contracting States will conform in accordance with the Convention".

A Recommended Practice is defined by the ICAO as "any specification for physical characteristics, configuration, material, performance, personnel or procedure, the uniform application of which is recognized as desirable in the interest of safety, regularity or efficiency of international air navigation and to which Contracting States will endeavour to conform in accordance with the Convention".

== Verification of compliance ==
The ICAO verifies compliance with SARPs through audits of state oversight systems. Currently there are two audit programmes:

- Universal Safety Oversight Audit Programme (USOAP)
- Universal Security Audit Programme (USAP)
