= International Civil Aviation Organization =

Specialized agency of the United Nations

Coordinates: 45°30′1″N 73°33′51″W

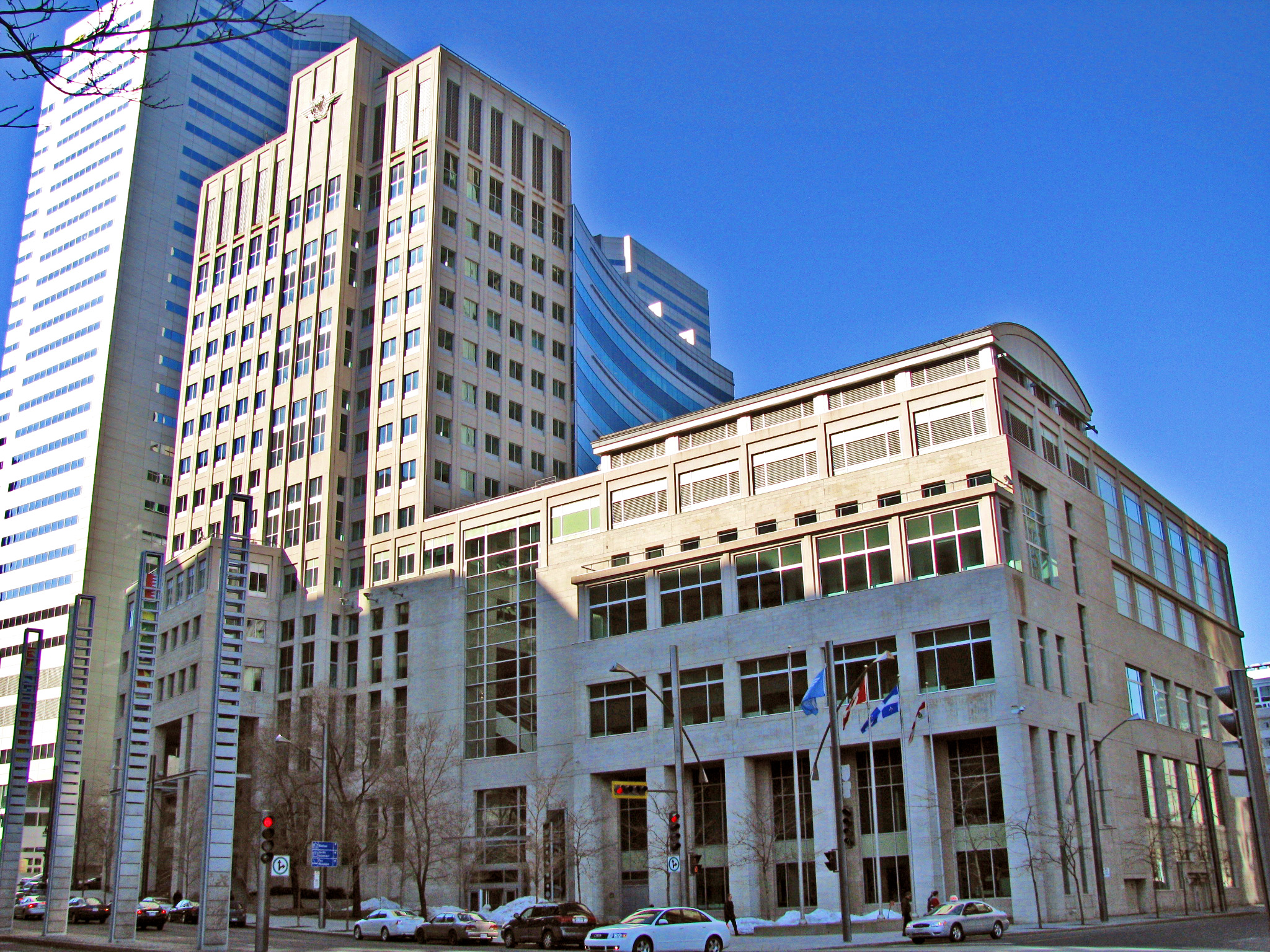
- ICAO's headquarters in Montreal
- Abbreviation: ICAO
- Formation: 4 April 1947; 79 years ago
- Type: United Nations specialized agency
- Legal status: Active
- Headquarters: Montreal, Quebec, Canada
- Official language: Arabic; Chinese; English; French; Russian; Spanish
- Secretary General: Juan Carlos Salazar Gómez
- Council President: Toshiyuki Onuma
- Main organ: Triennial Assembly; ICAO Council; ICAO Secretariat
- Website: icao.int

The International Civil Aviation Organization (ICAO) (Note: /aɪ.ˈkeɪ.oʊ/ eye-KAY-oh) is a specialized agency of the United Nations that coordinates the principles and techniques of international air navigation, and fosters the planning and development of international air transport to ensure safe and orderly growth. The ICAO headquarters are in the Quartier international de Montréal of Montreal, Quebec, Canada.

The ICAO Council adopts Standards and Recommended Practices concerning air navigation, its infrastructure, flight inspection, prevention of unlawful interference, and facilitation of border-crossing procedures for international civil aviation. ICAO defines the protocols for air accident investigation that are followed by transport safety authorities in countries signatory to the Convention on International Civil Aviation.

The Air Navigation Commission (ANC) is the technical body within ICAO. The commission is composed of 19 commissioners, nominated by the ICAO's contracting states and appointed by the ICAO Council. Commissioners serve as independent experts, who although nominated by their states, do not serve as state or political representatives. International Standards and Recommended Practices are developed under the direction of the ANC through the formal process of ICAO Panels. Once approved by the commission, standards are sent to the council, the political body of ICAO, for consultation and coordination with the member states before final adoption.

ICAO is distinct from other international air transport organizations, particularly because it alone is vested with international authority (among signatory states): other organizations include the International Air Transport Association (IATA), a trade association representing airlines; the Civil Air Navigation Services Organisation (CANSO), an organization for air navigation service providers (ANSPs); and the Airports Council International, a trade association of airport authorities. In addition there are several regional civil aviation commissions, such as the Latin American Civil Aviation Commission (LACAC) who focus on challenges and growth in specific regions.

== History ==
=== 20th century ===
In the early 20th Century, the International Telecommunication Union met to discuss and implement one of the first internationally agreed upon standards relating to aviation, country-specific prefixes for aircraft callsigns. The first convention was held in 1903 in Berlin, Germany, but no agreements were reached among the eight countries that attended. At the second convention in 1906, also held in Berlin, twenty-seven countries attended. The third convention, held in London in 1912, allocated the first radio callsigns for use by aircraft. Following this, at the Paris Convention of 1919, a forerunner to ICAO named ICAN was established, the International Commission for Air Navigation. ICAN continued to operate until 1945.

The Convention on International Civil Aviation, also known as the Chicago Convention, in Chicago, was signed by 52 countries on 7 December 1944. Under its terms, a Provisional International Civil Aviation Organization was to be established, to be replaced in turn by a permanent organization when twenty-six countries ratified the convention. PICAO began operating on 6 June 1945, replacing ICAN. The 26th country ratified the convention on 5 March 1947 and, consequently, PICAO held its last session from 29 April 1947 until 7 May 1947, with the Convention on International Civil Aviation coming into force on 4 April 1947.

In October 1947, ICAO became an agency of the United Nations under its Economic and Social Council (ECOSOC).

=== 21st century ===
In April 2013, Qatar offered to serve as the new permanent seat of the Organization. Qatar promised to construct a massive new headquarters for ICAO and to cover all moving expenses, stating that Montreal "was too far from Europe and Asia", "had cold winters", was hard to attend due to the Canadian government's slow issuance of visas, and that the taxes imposed on ICAO by Canada were too high. According to The Globe and Mail, Qatar's invitation was at least partly motivated by the pro-Israel foreign policy of Canadian prime minister Stephen Harper. Approximately a month later, Qatar withdrew its bid after a separate proposal to the ICAO's governing council to move the ICAO triennial conference to Doha was defeated by a vote of 22–14.

In June 2014, the Montreal Metro station closest to the ICAO headquarters was renamed Square-Victoria–OACI, (Note: OACI stands for Organisation de l'aviation civile internationale, the French name of the ICAO) celebrating the 70th anniversary of ICAO's presence in Montreal.

==== Taiwan controversy ====
In January 2020, ICAO blocked several Twitter users, including think-tank analysts, U.S. Congressional staff, and journalists, who mentioned Taiwan in tweets related to ICAO. Many of the tweets were related to the COVID-19 pandemic and Taiwan's exclusion from ICAO safety and health bulletins due to pressure from China. In response, ICAO issued a tweet stating that publishers of "irrelevant, compromising and offensive material" would be "precluded".

Since that action, the organization has followed a policy of blocking anyone asking about it.

The United States House Committee on Foreign Affairs harshly criticized ICAO's perceived failure to uphold principles of fairness, inclusion, and transparency by silencing non-disruptive opposing voices. Senator Marco Rubio also criticized the move. The Taiwanese Ministry of Foreign Affairs (MOFA) and legislators criticized the move, with MOFA head Jaushieh Joseph Wu tweeting in support of those blocked.

In January 2020, Anthony Philbin, Chief of Communications for the ICAO Secretary General, defended ICAO's actions, stating, "We felt completely justified in taking steps to protect the integrity of the information and discussions that our followers reasonably expect from our feeds." In exchanges with the International Flight Network, Philbin refused to acknowledge the existence of Taiwan.

On 1 February 2020, the United States Department of State issued a press release heavily criticizing ICAO's actions, characterizing them as "outrageous, unacceptable, and not befitting of a UN organization."

==== North Korea controversy ====
On 2 May 2025, the ICAO Council expressed grave concern over ongoing Global Navigation Satellite System (GNSS) radio frequency interference in the Incheon Flight Information Region (FIR), incidents that have persisted since 2 October 2024, and are attributed to North Korea, officially known as the Democratic People's Republic of Korea (DPRK). The Council emphasized that such interference endangers international air navigation safety and violates the principles of the Chicago Convention. It strongly urged the DPRK to adhere to its international obligations and prevent future occurrences. Given the severity of the situation, the Council is considering reporting the matter to the 42nd Session of the ICAO Assembly in September 2025, as per Article 54(k) of the Convention, and will continue to monitor developments closely.

== Statute ==
The 9th edition of the Convention on International Civil Aviation includes modifications from years 1948 up to 2006. ICAO refers to its current edition of the convention as the Statute and designates it as ICAO Document 7300/9. The convention has 19 Annexes that are listed by title in the article Convention on International Civil Aviation.

== Membership ==
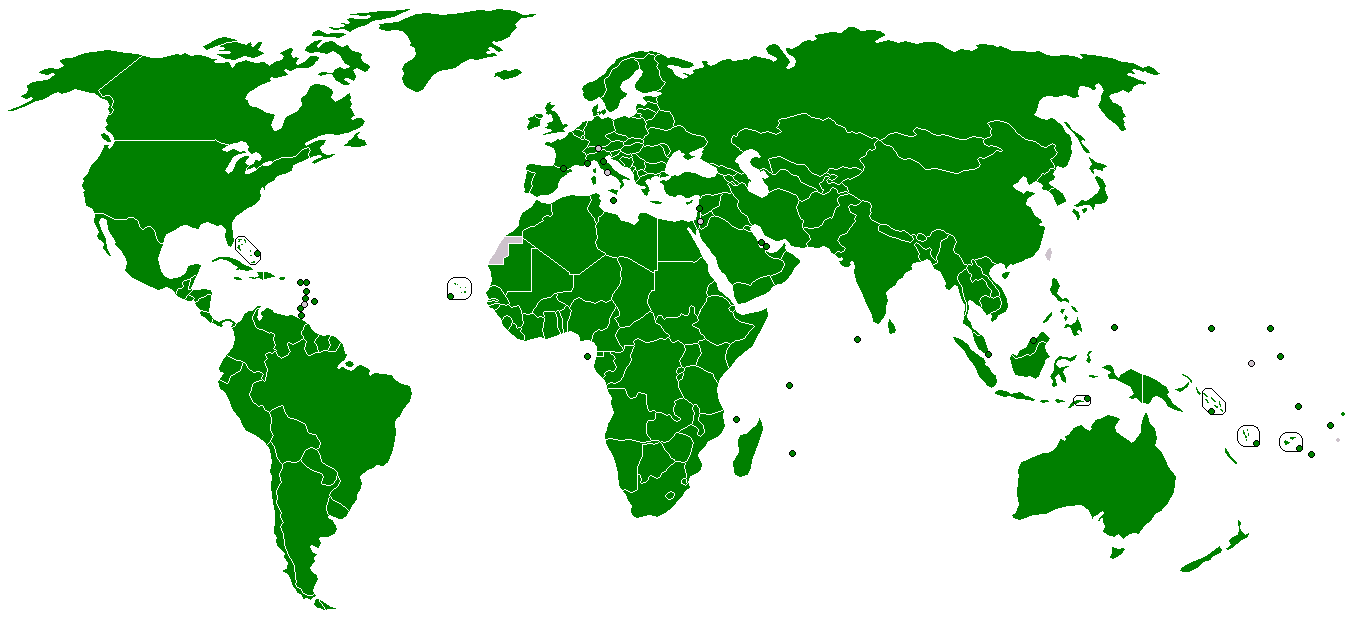
International Civil Aviation Organization member states

As of April 2019, there are 193 ICAO members, consisting of 192 of the 193 UN members (all but Liechtenstein, which lacks an international airport), plus the Cook Islands.

Despite Liechtenstein not being a direct party to ICAO, its government delegated Switzerland to enter into the treaty on its behalf in 1947, and the treaty is applicable in the territory of Liechtenstein.

=== Exclusion of Taiwan ===
The Republic of China was a founding member of ICAO. Following its retreat to Taiwan, it was eventually replaced by the People's Republic of China as the legal representative of China in 1971.

In 2013, Taiwan was for the first time invited to attend the ICAO Assembly, at its 38th session, as a guest under the name of "Chinese Taipei". As of September 2019, it has not been invited to participate again, due to renewed PRC pressure.

The host government, Canada, supports Taiwan's inclusion in ICAO. Support also comes from Canada's commercial sector with the president of the Air Transport Association of Canada saying in 2019 that "It's about safety in aviation so from a strictly operational and non-political point of view, I believe Taiwan should be there."

== Council ==
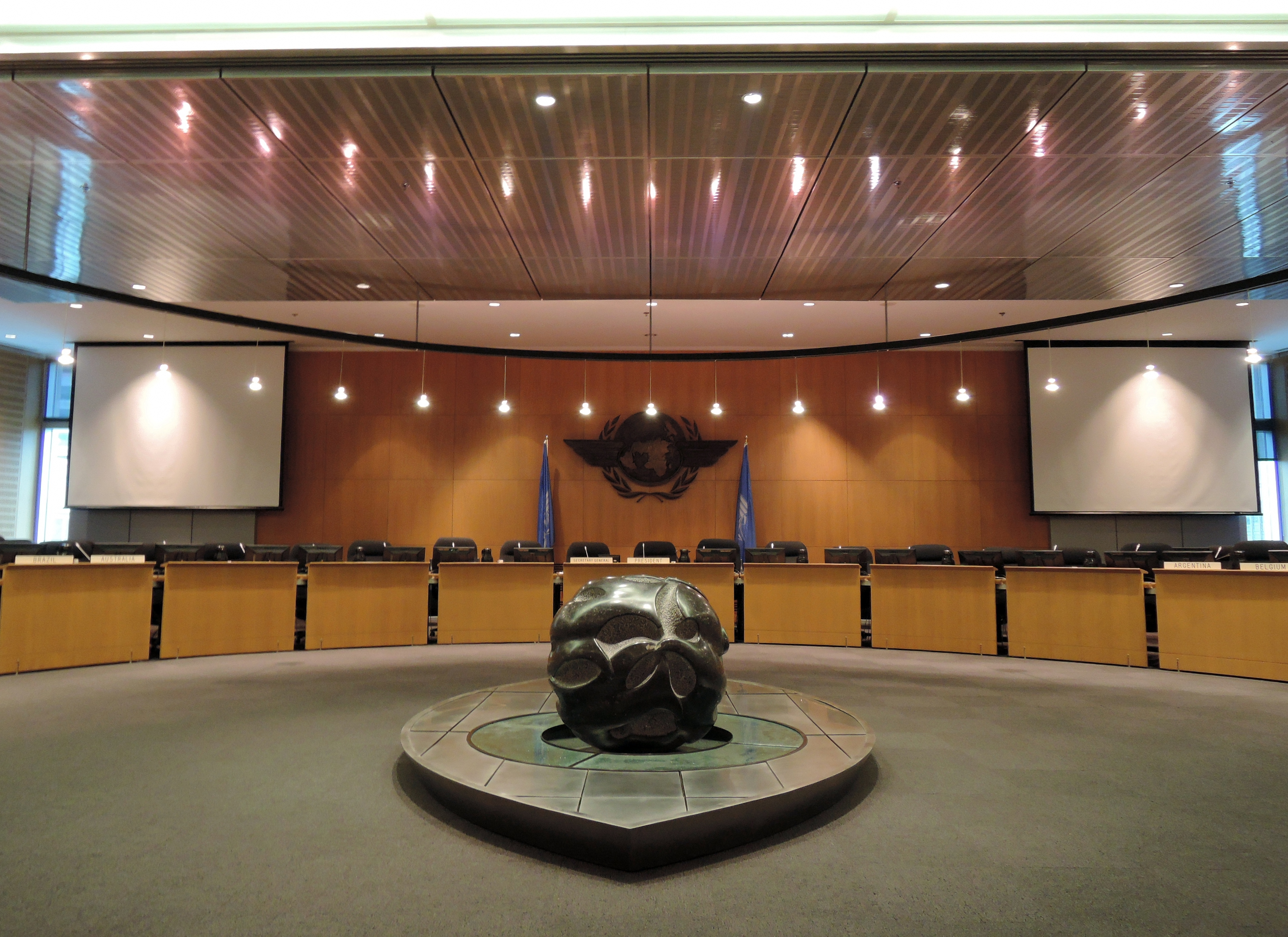
The ICAO's council chamber in July 2013

The ICAO Council is elected by the Assembly every three years and consists of 36 members elected in three groups. The present council was elected in September 2025. The structure of the present Council is as follows:

| Group I (Chief Importance) | Group II (Large Contributions) | Group III (Geographic Representations) |
|---|---|---|
| Australia; Brazil; Canada; China; France; Germany; Italy; Japan; United Kingdom; United States | Argentina; Colombia; Denmark; Egypt; India; Mexico; Nigeria; Saudi Arabia; Singapore; South Africa; Spain; Switzerland | Angola; Belize; Cuba; Ecuador; Equatorial Guinea; Malaysia; Mali; Morocco; Poland; Qatar; South Korea; Uganda; United Arab Emirates; Uruguay |

Historical Membership of the Council
| | Group I (Chief Importance) | Group II (Large Contributions) | Group III (Geographic Representations) |
| 1947–1950 | Belgium; Brazil; Canada; France; Mexico; Netherlands; United Kingdom; United States | Argentina; Australia; China; Egypt; India; Ireland; Portugal | Chile; Czechoslovakia; Iraq; Peru; Sweden; Turkey |
| 1950–1953 Asterisk (*) denotes countries elected in an off-year election (1951) | Argentina • Australia • Belgium • Brazil • Canada • Denmark • Egypt • France • Iraq • Ireland • Italy • Mexico • Netherlands • Philippines • Portugal • Spain* • South Africa • United States • Venezuela | | |
| 1953–1956 | Argentina • Australia • Belgium • Brazil • Canada • Denmark • Egypt • France • India • Iraq • Ireland • Italy • Lebanon • Mexico • Netherlands • Norway • Philippines • Portugal • Spain • South Africa • United States • Venezuela | | |
| 1956–1959 | Australia; Brazil; Canada; France; Netherlands; Sweden; United Kingdom; United States | Argentina; Belgium; Egypt; India; Italy; Japan; Mexico | Ireland; Lebanon; Portugal; Spain; South Africa; Venezuela |
| 1959–1962 | Australia; Brazil; Canada; Denmark; France; Netherlands; United Kingdom; United States | Argentina; West Germany; India; Italy; Japan; United Arab Republic; Venezuela | Guatemala; Lebanon; Philippines; Portugal; Spain; South Africa |
| 1962–1965 | Australia; Brazil; Canada; France; Italy; Netherlands; Norway; United Kingdom; United States | Argentina; Belgium; West Germany; India; Japan; Lebanon; Mexico; Spain; United Arab Republic | Colombia; Congo; Indonesia; Madagascar; Nicaragua; Nigeria; Philippines; Tunisia; South Africa |
| 1965–1968 | Australia; Brazil; Canada; France; West Germany; Italy; Sweden; United Kingdom; United States | Argentina; Belgium; India; Japan; Lebanon; Mexico; Netherlands; Spain; United Arab Republic | Colombia; Congo; Costa Rica; Czechoslovakia; Kenya; Madagascar; Nigeria; Philippines; Tunisia |
| 1968–1971 | Australia; Brazil; Canada; France; West Germany; Italy; Japan; United Kingdom; United States | Argentina; Belgium; Denmark; India; Lebanon; Mexico; Netherlands; Spain; United Arab Republic | Colombia; Congo; Czechoslovakia; Guatemala; Indonesia; Nigeria; Senegal; Tanzania; Tunisia |
| 1971–1974 Asterisk (*) denotes countries elected in an off-year election (1973) | Brazil; Canada; France; West Germany; Italy; Japan; Netherlands*; Soviet Union; United Kingdom; United States | Argentina; Australia; Belgium; India; Lebanon; Mexico; Norway; Pakistan*; Spain; United Arab Republic | Colombia; Congo; Czechoslovakia; Indonesia; Nicaragua; Nigeria; Senegal; Trinidad and Tobago*; Tunisia; Uganda |
| 1974–1977 | Australia; Brazil; Canada; France; West Germany; Italy; Japan; Soviet Union; United Kingdom; United States | Argentina; China; Czechoslovakia; Egypt; India; Lebanon; Mexico; Pakistan; Spain; Sweden | Colombia; Costa Rica; Indonesia; Kenya; Madagascar; Morocco; Nigeria; Senegal; Trinidad and Tobago; Yugoslavia |
| 1977–1980 | Australia; Brazil; Canada; France; West Germany; Italy; Japan; Soviet Union; United Kingdom; United States | Argentina; China; Egypt; Finland; India; Lebanon; Mexico; Nigeria; Pakistan; Spain | Colombia; Czechoslovakia; Honduras; Indonesia; Jamaica; Madagascar; Morocco; Senegal; Tanzania; Yugoslavia |
| 1980–1983 | Australia; Brazil; Canada; France; West Germany; Italy; Japan; Soviet Union; United Kingdom; United States | Argentina; China; Denmark; Egypt; India; Lebanon; Mexico; Netherlands; Nigeria; Spain; Venezuela | Algeria; Cameroon; Colombia; Czechoslovakia; El Salvador; Indonesia; Iraq; Jamaica; Madagascar; Pakistan; Senegal; Uganda |
| 1983–1986 | Australia; Brazil; Canada; France; West Germany; Italy; Japan; Soviet Union; United Kingdom; United States | Argentina; Belgium; China; Egypt; India; Lebanon; Mexico; Nigeria; Norway; Spain; Venezuela | Algeria; Colombia; Czechoslovakia; Guatemala; Indonesia; Iraq; Jamaica; Kenya; Madagascar; Pakistan; Senegal; Tanzania |
| 1986–1989 | Australia; Brazil; Canada; France; West Germany; Italy; Japan; Soviet Union; United Kingdom; United States | Argentina; China; Egypt; India; Mexico; Nigeria; Saudi Arabia; Spain; Sweden; Switzerland; Venezuela | Cuba; Czechoslovakia; Ghana; Indonesia; Iraq; Kenya; Pakistan; Panama; Peru; Senegal; Tanzania; Tunisia |
| 1989–1992 | Australia; Brazil; Canada; France; West Germany; Italy; Japan; Soviet Union; United Kingdom; United States | Argentina; China; Egypt; Finland; India; Mexico; Netherlands; Nigeria; Saudi Arabia; Spain; Venezuela | Chile; Czechoslovakia; Ghana; Honduras; Indonesia; Iraq; Madagascar; Pakistan; Senegal; Tanzania; Trinidad and Tobago; Tunisia |
| 1992–1995 | Australia; Brazil; Canada; France; Germany; Italy; Japan; Russia; United Kingdom; United States | Argentina; Belgium; China; Colombia; Egypt; Iceland; India; Mexico; Nigeria; Saudi Arabia; Spain | Cameroon; Czechoslovakia / Czechia; Ghana; Ecuador; Indonesia; Kenya; Lebanon; Morocco; Nicaragua; Pakistan; Senegal; Tanzania; Trinidad and Tobago |
| 1995–1998 | Australia; Brazil; Canada; France; Germany; Italy; Japan; Russia; United Kingdom; United States | Argentina; China; Denmark; Egypt; India; Mexico; Nigeria; Saudi Arabia; Spain; Switzerland; Venezuela | Angola; Bolivia; Cameroon; El Salvador; Indonesia; Kenya; Lebanon; Morocco; Pakistan; Romania; Senegal; Trinidad and Tobago |
| 1998–2001 | Australia; Brazil; Canada; France; Germany; Italy; Japan; Russia; United Kingdom; United States | Argentina; China; Colombia; Egypt; India; Mexico; Netherlands; Nigeria; Norway; Saudi Arabia; Spain | Algeria; Botswana; Cameroon; Cuba; Indonesia; Kenya; Lebanon; Pakistan; Panama; Senegal; Slovakia; Uruguay |
| 2001–2004 Asterisk (*) denotes countries elected in an off-year election (2003) | Australia; Brazil; Canada; France; Germany; Italy; Japan; Russia; United Kingdom; United States | Argentina; China; Egypt; India; Ireland; Mexico; Nigeria; Saudi Arabia; Singapore*; South Africa*; Spain; Sweden; Venezuela | Algeria; Cameroon; Chile*; Costa Rica; Cuba; Czechia; Ethiopia; Lebanon; Mauritius; Pakistan; Paraguay; Senegal; South Korea |
| 2004–2007 | Australia; Brazil; Canada; China; France; Germany; Italy; Japan; Russia; United Kingdom; United States | Argentina; Austria; Colombia; Egypt; Finland; India; Mexico; Nigeria; Saudi Arabia; Singapore; South Africa; Spain | Cameroon; Chile; Ethiopia; Ghana; Honduras; Hungary; Lebanon; Mozambique; Pakistan; Peru; Saint Lucia; South Korea; Tunisia |
| 2007–2010 | Australia; Brazil; Canada; China; France; Germany; Italy; Japan; Russia; United Kingdom; United States | Argentina; Egypt; Iceland; India; Mexico; Nigeria; Saudi Arabia; Singapore; South Africa; Spain; Switzerland; Venezuela | Cameroon; Dominican Republic; Ecuador; El Salvador; Ghana; Malaysia; Namibia; Romania; South Korea; Tunisia; Uganda; United Arab Emirates; Uruguay |
| 2010–2013 | Australia; Brazil; Canada; China; France; Germany; Italy; Japan; Russia; United Kingdom; United States | Argentina; Belgium; Colombia; Denmark; Egypt; India; Mexico; Nigeria; Saudi Arabia; Singapore; South Africa; Spain | Burkina Faso; Cameroon; Cuba; Eswatini; Guatemala; Malaysia; Morocco; Paraguay; Peru; Slovenia; South Korea; Uganda; United Arab Emirates |
| 2013–2016 | Australia; Brazil; Canada; China; France; Germany; Italy; Japan; Russia; United Kingdom; United States | Argentina; Egypt; India; Mexico; Nigeria; Norway; Portugal; Saudi Arabia; Singapore; South Africa; Spain; Venezuela | Bolivia; Burkina Faso; Cameroon; Chile; Dominican Republic; Kenya; Libya; Malaysia; Nicaragua; Poland; South Korea; Tanzania; United Arab Emirates |
| 2016–2019 | Australia; Brazil; Canada; China; France; Germany; Italy; Japan; Russia; United Kingdom; United States | Argentina; Colombia; Egypt; India; Ireland; Mexico; Nigeria; Saudi Arabia; Singapore; South Africa; Sweden | Algeria; Cape Verde; Congo; Ecuador; Kenya; Malaysia; Panama; South Korea; Tanzania; Turkey; United Arab Emirates; Uruguay |
| 2019–2022 | Australia; Brazil; Canada; China; France; Germany; Italy; Japan; Russia; United Kingdom; United States | Argentina; Colombia; Egypt; Finland; India; Mexico; Netherlands; Nigeria; Saudi Arabia; Singapore; South Africa; Spain | Costa Rica; Dominican Republic; Equatorial Guinea; Greece; Ivory Coast; Malaysia; Paraguay; Peru; South Korea; Sudan; Tunisia; United Arab Emirates; Zambia |
| 2022–2025 | Australia; Brazil; Canada; China; France; Germany; Italy; Japan; United Kingdom; United States | Argentina; Austria; Egypt; Iceland; India; Mexico; Nigeria; Saudi Arabia; Singapore; South Africa; Spain; Venezuela | Bolivia; Chile; El Salvador; Equatorial Guinea; Ethiopia; Ghana; Jamaica; Malaysia; Mauritania; Qatar; South Korea; Romania; United Arab Emirates; Zimbabwe |

ICAO Members Never Elected to the Council
Afghanistan • Albania • Andorra • Antigua and Barbuda • Armenia • Azerbaijan • Bahamas • Bahrain • Bangladesh • Barbados • Belarus • Benin • Bhutan • Bosnia and Herzegovina • Brunei • Bulgaria • Burundi • Cambodia • Central African Republic • Chad • Comoros • DR Congo • Croatia • Cyprus • Djibouti • Dominica • East Timor • Eritrea • Estonia • Fiji • Gabon • Gambia • Georgia • Grenada • Guinea • Guinea-Bissau • Guyana • Haiti • Iran • Israel • Jordan • Kazakhstan • Kiribati • Kuwait • Kyrgyzstan • Laos • Latvia • Lesotho • Liberia • Lithuania • Luxembourg • Malawi • Maldives • Malta • Marshall Islands • Micronesia • Moldova • Monaco • Mongolia • Montenegro • Myanmar • Nauru • Nepal • New Zealand • Niger • North Korea • North Macedonia • Oman • Palau • Papua New Guinea • Rwanda • Saint Kitts and Nevis • Saint Vincent and the Grenadines • Samoa • San Marino • São Tomé and Príncipe • Serbia • Seychelles • Sierra Leone • Solomon Islands • Somalia • South Sudan • Sri Lanka • Suriname • Syria • Tajikistan • Thailand • Togo • Tonga • Turkmenistan • Tuvalu • Ukraine • Uzbekistan • Vanuatu • Vietnam • Yemen

== Air Navigation Commission ==
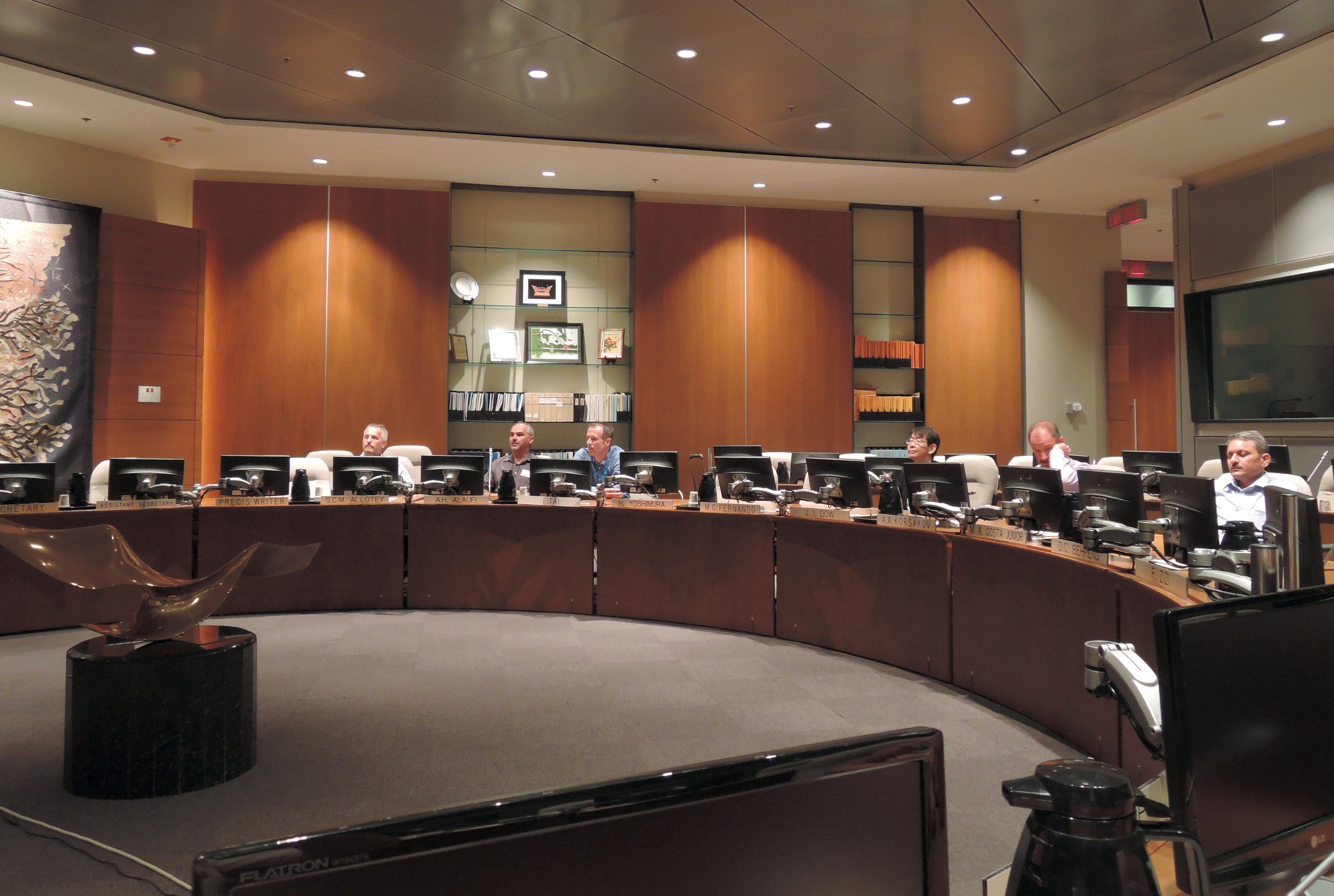
Meeting room of ICAO's Air Navigation Commission in July 2013

The Air Navigation Commission (ANC) is the ICAO Council technical executive body in charge of 17 of the 19 Annexes to the Chicago Convention. ANC develops and recommends ICAO minimal standards that are related to these Annexes. To review and/or finalize the ongoing developments the commission meets for three sessions per year. Each session normally considers a number of documents being developments of ANC expert Panels. The ANC is composed of nineteen commissioners nominated by ICAO States in various aviation domains. However, legally these commissioners do not represent the interest of their State or any particular State or region. They have to conduct themselves independently in the interest of the entire international civil aviation community. Additionally, several other representatives from ICAO States and up to eight members from the civil aviation industry may be invited to take part in ANC meetings as observers.

== Standards ==
ICAO also standardizes certain functions for use in the airline industry, such as the Aeronautical Message Handling System (AMHS). This makes it a standards organization.

Each country should have an accessible Aeronautical Information Publication (AIP), based on standards defined by ICAO, containing information essential to air navigation. Countries are required to update their AIP manuals every 28 days and so provide definitive regulations, procedures and information for each country about airspace and airports. ICAO's standards also dictate that temporary hazards to aircraft must be regularly published using NOTAMs.

ICAO defines an International Standard Atmosphere (also known as ICAO Standard Atmosphere), a model of the standard variation of pressure, temperature, density, and viscosity with altitude in the Earth's atmosphere. This is useful in calibrating instruments and designing aircraft. The standardized pressure is also used in calibrating instruments in-flight, particularly above the transition altitude.

ICAO is active in infrastructure management, including communication, navigation and surveillance / air traffic management (CNS/ATM) systems, which employ digital technologies (like satellite systems with various levels of automation) in order to maintain a seamless global air traffic management system.

=== Passport standards ===
ICAO has published standards for machine-readable passports. Machine-readable passports have an area where some of the information otherwise written in textual form is also written as strings of alphanumeric characters, printed in a manner suitable for optical character recognition, which enables border controllers and other law enforcement agents to process such passports more quickly without having to enter the information manually into a computer.

ICAO's technical standard for machine-readable passports is contained in Document 9303 Machine Readable Travel Documents.

A more recent standard covers biometric passports. These contain biometrics to authenticate the identity of travellers. The passport's critical information is stored on a tiny RFID computer chip, much like information stored on smart cards. Like some smart cards, the passport book design calls for an embedded contactless chip that is able to hold digital signature data to ensure the integrity of the passport and the biometric data.

=== Aerodrome reference code ===
Aerodrome reference code
| Number | Field length |
|---|---|
| 1 | < 800 m (2,625 ft) |
| 2 | 800–1,200 m (2,625–3,937 ft) |
| 3 | 1,200–1,800 m (3,937–5,906 ft) |
| 4 | ≥ 1,800 m (5,906 ft) |

Aerodrome reference code
| Letter | Wingspan | Main gear span | Airbus | Boeing | Others |
|---|---|---|---|---|---|
| A | < 15 m (49.2 ft) | < 4.5 m (14.8 ft) | | | BN-2 Islander, Tecnam P2012 |
| B | 15–24 m (49.2–78.7 ft) | 4.5–6 m (14.8–19.7 ft) | | | CRJ 100/200/700, Embraer ERJ, Saab 340, EMB 120 |
| C | 24–36 m (78.7–118.1 ft) | 6–9 m (19.7–29.5 ft) | A220, A320 family | B717, B727, B737 | ATR 42/72, CRJ900/1000, Dash 8, Embraer E-Jet |
| D | 36–52 m (118.1–170.6 ft) | 9–14 m (29.5–45.9 ft) | A300/A310 | B707, B757, B767 | DC-10/MD-11, IL-86, L-1011 |
| E | 52–65 m (170.6–213.3 ft) | 9–14 m (29.5–45.9 ft) | A330/A340, A350 | B747, B777, B787 | IL-96 |
| F | 65–80 m (213.3–262.5 ft) | 14–16 m (45.9–52.5 ft) | A380 | B747-8 | Antonov An-124 Ruslan |

== Registered codes ==
Both ICAO and IATA have their own airport and airline code systems.

=== Airport codes ===
ICAO uses 4-letter airport codes (vs. IATA's 3-letter codes). The ICAO code is based on the region and country of the airport—for example, Paris Charles de Gaulle Airport has an ICAO code of LFPG, where L indicates Southern Europe, F, France, PG, Paris de Gaulle, while Orly Airport has the code LFPO (the 3rd letter sometimes refers to the particular flight information region (FIR) or the last two may be arbitrary). In most parts of the world, ICAO and IATA codes are unrelated; for example, Paris Charles de Gaulle Airport has an IATA code of CDG. However, the location prefix for the continental United States is K, and ICAO codes are usually the IATA code with this prefix. For example, the ICAO code for Los Angeles International Airport is KLAX. Canada follows a similar pattern, where a prefix of C is usually added to an IATA code to create the ICAO code. For example, Calgary International Airport is YYC or CYYC. (In contrast, airports in Hawaii are in the Pacific region and so have ICAO codes that start with PH; Kona International Airport's code is PHKO. Similarly, airports in Alaska have ICAO codes that start with PA. Merrill Field, for instance is PAMR.) Not all airports are assigned codes in both systems; for example, airports that do not have airline service do not need an IATA code.

=== Airline codes ===
ICAO also assigns three-letter airline codes versus the more-familiar two-letter IATA codes—for example, UAL vs. UA for United Airlines. ICAO also provides telephony designators to aircraft operators worldwide, a one- or two-word designator used on the radio, usually, but not always, similar to the aircraft operator name. For example, the identifier for Japan Airlines International is JAL and the designator is Japan Air, but Aer Lingus is EIN and Shamrock. Thus, a Japan Airlines flight numbered 111 would be written as "JAL111" and pronounced "Japan Air One One One" on the radio, while a similarly numbered Aer Lingus would be written as "EIN111" and pronounced "Shamrock One One One". In the US, FAA practices require the digits of the flight number to be spoken in group format ("Japan Air One Eleven" in the above example) while individual digits are used for the aircraft tail number used for unscheduled civil flights.

=== Aircraft registrations ===
ICAO maintains the standards for aircraft registration, including the alphanumeric codes that identify the country of registration.

=== Aircraft type designators ===
ICAO is also responsible for issuing two to four character alphanumeric aircraft type designators for those aircraft types which are most commonly provided with air traffic service. These codes provide an abbreviated aircraft type identification, typically used in flight plans. For example, the Boeing 747-100, -200 and -300 are given the type designators B741, B742 and B743 respectively.

== International System of Units ==
Since 2010, ICAO recommends a unification of units of measurement within aviation based on the International System of Units (SI), using:

- kilometres per hour (km/h) for speed during travel.
- metres per second (m/s) for wind speed during landing.
- kilometres (km) for distance.
- metres (m) for elevation.

Non-SI units have been permitted for temporary use since 1979, but a termination date has not yet been established, which would complete metrication of worldwide aviation, and the following units are still in widespread use within commercial aviation:

- knots (kn or kt) for speed.
- nautical mile (NM) for distance.
- foot (ft) for elevation.

Inches of mercury are used in Japan and North America to measure pressure, although sometimes METAR at Japanese airports show only hectopascals (hPa).

Aviation in Russia and China currently uses kilometres per hour for reporting airspeed, and many present-day European glider planes also indicate airspeed in kilometres per hour. China and North Korea use metres for reporting altitude when communicating with pilots. Russia also formerly used metres exclusively for reporting altitude, but in 2011 changed to feet for high altitude flight. From February 2017, Russian airspace started transitioning to reporting altitude in feet only. Runway lengths are now commonly given in metres worldwide, except in North America where feet are commonly used.

The following table summarizes units commonly used in flight and ground operations and their recommended replacement. A full list of recommended units can be found in annex 5 to the Convention on International Civil Aviation.

Table of units commonly used in aviation
| Measurement | Recommended | Current de facto | Comment |
|---|---|---|---|
| Airspeed and ground speed | km/h | kn or kt | Mach is sometimes instead used for high altitude flight. |
| Distance (ground) | km | nmi | Distance in km has widespread use in European gliders. |
| Flight level^{†} | m | ft | Metres are used by China, Mongolia, North Korea, Kyrgyzstan, Kazakhstan, Tajikistan and Uzbekistan, and formerly Russia. From 2017, Russian airspace has transitioned from metres to feet. |
| Runway length | m | m or ft | Feet are still used for runway lengths in North America. |
| Wind speed | m/s | kn or kt | Until 2010 ICAO recommended km/h for reporting wind speed on runways. Metres per second is used by Russian and Chinese airports. |
| Rate of climb | m/s | ft/min, kn, m/s | Lift and sink rate is measured using a variometer. |
| Temperature | °C | °C | Celsius is used for aviation weather reporting globally. Fahrenheit (°F) may be used for displaying, controlling, and documenting system temperatures (HVAC, engine) on older North American aircraft. |
| Liquid precipitation | mm | in | |
| Atmospheric pressure | hPa | inHg, mbar, hPa | Hectopascals are mostly used in aviation worldwide, while inches of mercury are used in Japan and North America. One hectopascal is equal to one millibar. |
| Visibility | m | ft, mi, m | Reported in metres for most of the world. Visibility over 5000 m may be given in kilometres. Canadian, American, and Mexican airports use statute miles, or feet when reporting laser measurements. |
| Cloud height | m | ft | |
| Time | UTC | UTC | |
| Tank capacity | L | kg, lb, UK gallon, US gallon, L | Used for fuel tank capacity of an aircraft. Unit varies depending on the gauges fitted to the aircraft. The most common current unit is kilograms. |
| Volume | m^{3} | m^{3} | Used for general volume capacity. |
| Mass | kg | lb, tonne, long ton, short ton, kg | Used for cargo capacity, fuel capacity, gross mass, payload. Tonne may also be used for gross mass and payload. Tons are often used informally during flight planning to gauge approximate weights. Ton then usually either refers to the tonne, or the long ton or short ton which differ from the tonne by about 2% and 10% respectively. |
| Attitude | deg | | Measured with an attitude indicator, and are always presented in degrees. (Sensors, data and calculations may however use a mix of degrees and radians, as many scientists and engineers prefer to work with radians.) |
| Turn and slip | deg/s, min/tr | | A common turn rate for commercial aircraft is 3 degrees per second, which is often translated to (the inverse unit) 2 minutes per turn. |
| Heading | compass points | | Measured with a heading indicator. |

^{†} Altitude, elevation, height.

== Regions and regional offices ==
ICAO has a headquarters, seven regional offices, and one regional sub-office:

- Headquarters – Montreal, Quebec, Canada
- Asia and Pacific (APAC) – Bangkok, Thailand; Sub-office – Beijing, China
- Eastern and Southern African (ESAF) – Nairobi, Kenya
- Europe and North Atlantic (EUR/NAT) – Paris, France
- Middle East (MID) – Cairo, Egypt
- North American, Central American and Caribbean (NACC) – Mexico City, Mexico
- South American (SAM) – Lima, Peru
- Western and Central African (WACAF) – Dakar, Senegal

== Leadership ==
=== List of secretaries general ===
| Secretary | Country of nationality | Term |
|---|---|---|
| Juan Carlos Salazar Gómez | Colombia | From August 2021 |
| Fang Liu | China | 2015 – August 2021 |
| Raymond Benjamin | France | 2009–2015 |
| Taïeb Chérif | Algeria | 2003–2009 |
| Renato Claudio Costa Pereira | Brazil | 1997–2003 |
| Philippe Rochat | Switzerland | 1991–1997 |
| Shivinder Singh Sidhu | India | 1988–1991 |
| Yves Lambert | France | 1976–1988 |
| Assad Kotaite | Lebanon | 1970–1976 |
| Bernardus Tielman Twigt | Netherlands | 1964–1970 |
| Ronald MacAllister Macdonnell | Canada | 1959–1964 |
| Carl Ljungberg | Sweden | 1952–1959 |
| Albert Roper | France | 1944–1951 |

=== List of council presidents ===
| President | Country of nationality | Term |
|---|---|---|
| Toshiyuki Onuma | Japan | 2026–present |
| Salvatore Sciacchitano | Italy | 2020–2025 |
| Olumuyiwa Benard Aliu | Nigeria | 2013–2019 |
| Roberto Kobeh González | Mexico | 2006–2013 |
| Assad Kotaite | Lebanon | 1976–2006 |
| Walter Binaghi | Argentina | 1957–1976 |
| Edward Pearson Warner | United States | 1947–1957 |

== Environment ==
Emissions from international aviation are specifically excluded from the targets agreed under the Kyoto Protocol. Instead, the Protocol invites developed countries to pursue the limitation or reduction of emissions through the International Civil Aviation Organization. ICAO's environmental committee continues to consider the potential for using market-based measures such as trading and charging, but this work is unlikely to lead to global action. It is currently developing guidance for states who wish to include aviation in an emissions trading scheme (ETS) to meet their Kyoto commitments, and for airlines who wish to participate voluntarily in a trading scheme.

Emissions from domestic aviation are included within the Kyoto targets agreed by countries. This has led to some national policies such as fuel and emission taxes for domestic air travel in the Netherlands and Norway, respectively. Although some countries tax the fuel used by domestic aviation, there is no duty on kerosene used on international flights.

ICAO is currently opposed to the inclusion of aviation in the European Union Emission Trading Scheme (EU ETS). The EU however, is pressing ahead with its plans to include aviation.

ICAO has been called "flawed and biased in favour of the industry" by Jo Dardenne, the manager for aviation at Transport and Environment.

=== Carbon Offsetting and Reduction Scheme for International Aviation ===
On 6 October 2016, the ICAO finalized an agreement among its 191 member nations to address the more than 1000 million tonnes of carbon dioxide emitted annually by international passenger and cargo flights. The agreement will use an offsetting scheme called CORSIA (the Carbon Offsetting and Reduction Scheme for International Aviation) under which forestry and other carbon-reducing activities are directly funded, amounting to about 2% of annual revenues for the sector. Rules against 'double counting' should ensure that existing forest protection efforts are not recycled. The scheme did not take effect until 2021 and will be voluntary until 2027, but many countries, including the US and China, have promised to begin at its 2020 inception date. Under the agreement, the global aviation emissions target is a 50% reduction by 2050 relative to 2005. NGO reaction to the deal was mixed.

The agreement has critics. It is not aligned with the 2015 Paris climate agreement, which set the objective of restricting global warming to 1.5 to 2 °C. A late draft of the agreement would have required the air transport industry to assess its share of global carbon budgeting to meet that objective, but the text was removed in the agreed version. CORSIA will regulate only about 25 percent of aviation's international emissions, since it grandfathers all emissions below the 2020 level, allowing unregulated growth until then. Only 65 nations will participate in the initial voluntary period, not including significant emitters Russia, India and perhaps Brazil. The agreement does not cover domestic emissions, which are 40% of the global industry's overall emissions. One observer of the ICAO convention made this summary:

Airline claims that flying will now be green are a myth. Taking a plane is the fastest and cheapest way to fry the planet and this deal won't reduce demand for jet fuel one drop. Instead offsetting aims to cut emissions in other industries,

although another critic called it "a timid step in the right direction."

ICAO has expressed strong opposition to 2025 proposals from various UN bodies and international organizations, including the International Monetary Fund, suggesting new taxes or levies on international aviation to fund global climate initiatives. ICAO contends that such measures could undermine CORSIA, emphasizing that CORSIA is the sole global framework for addressing international aviation emissions and warning that additional levies could disrupt its implementation and the broader goal of sustainable aviation development. While acknowledging the need for increased climate finance, ICAO urged stakeholders to support existing mechanisms like CORSIA rather than introducing potentially conflicting financial measures.

=== Air quality ===
Emissions limits for aircraft engines are defined by the Annex 16, Volume 2 of the ICAO Technology Standards, they include standards for hydrocarbons, carbon monoxide, NO_{x}, smoke and particulate matter for local air quality near airports, below 3,000 ft (910 m). The first ICAO emissions regulation was adopted in 1981, and more stringent NO_{x} standards were subsequently adopted: CAEP/2 in 1993, CAEP/4 in 1999, CAEP/6 in 2005 and CAEP/8 in 2011. Higher bypass ratios, lean burn and Rich Quick Quench Lean combustor design can reduce NO_{x} emissions.

== Investigations of air disasters ==
Most air accident investigations are carried out by an agency of a country that is associated in some way with the accident. For example, the Air Accidents Investigation Branch conducts accident investigations on behalf of the British Government. ICAO has conducted four investigations involving air disasters, of which two were passenger airliners shot down while in international flight over hostile territory.

1. Libyan Arab Airlines Flight 114 which was shot down on 21 February 1973 by Israeli F-4 jets over the Sinai Peninsula during a period of tension that led to the Arab-Israeli Yom Kippur War killing 108 people.
2. Korean Air Lines Flight 007, which was shot down on 1 September 1983 by a Soviet Su-15 interceptor near Moneron Island just west of Sakhalin Island during a period of heightened Cold War tension killing all 269 people on board including U.S. Representative Larry McDonald.
3. UTA Flight 772, which was destroyed by a bomb on 19 September 1989 above the Sahara Desert in Niger, en route from N'Djamena, Chad, to Paris, France. The explosion caused the aircraft to break up, killing all 156 passengers and 15 crew members, including the wife of U.S. Ambassador Robert L. Pugh. Investigators determined that a bomb placed in the cargo hold by Chadian rebels backed by Libya was responsible for the explosion. A French court convicted in absentia six Libyans of planning and implementing the attack.
4. The 1996 shootdown of Brothers to the Rescue aircraft on 24 February 1996, when two civilian aircraft operating north of Cuba were shot down by two jets of the Cuban Air Force. The Cuban military alleged that aircraft operated by the group Brothers to the Rescue had scattered propaganda leaflets onto Cuba prior to the incident, and issued orders that such aircraft be shot down. All four crew members aboard the two aircraft were killed, whilst a third aircraft managed to escape and return to the American mainland.

== Drone regulations and registration ==
Under consideration is the establishment of singular ledger for drone registration for the use of law enforcement globally. This activity is seen as a forerunner to global regulations on drone aviation under the aegis of the ICAO.

ICAO currently maintains the 'UAS Regulation Portal' for various countries to list their country's UAS regulations and also review the best practices from across the globe.

== See also ==
- Airline codes (includes ICAO codes)
- Fédération Aéronautique Internationale (FAI)
- Freedoms of the air
- ICAO airport code
- International Maritime Organization
- Kenneth Macdonald Beaumont – former member of a committee in ICAO
- List of aircraft manufacturers by ICAO name
- International Aviation Services Organization
- NATO phonetic alphabet, also known as ICAO phonetic alphabet
