= Salvatore Sciacchitano =

Italian engineer and aviation executive (born 1954)

Salvatore Sciacchitano BBM
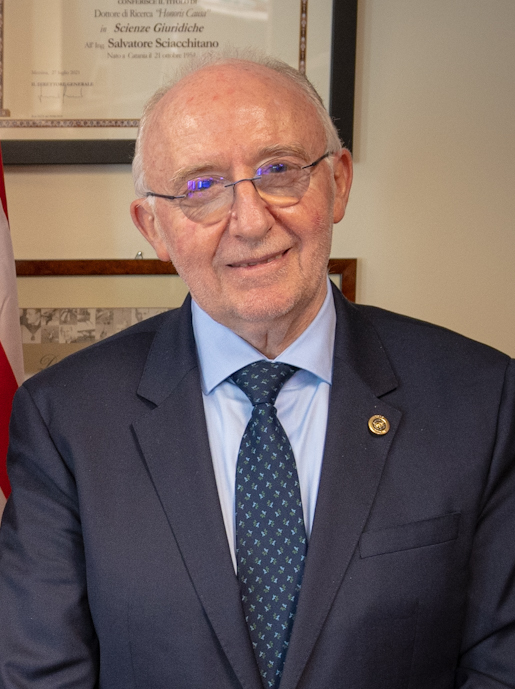
- Sciacchitano in 2022
- Born: 1954 (age 71–72); Catania, Sicily, Italy
- Education: University of Catania
- Employer: International Civil Aviation Organization

Salvatore Sciacchitano (Italian: [salvaˈtoːre ʃʃakkiˈtaːno]; born 1954) is an Italian engineer who was the sixth President of the Council of the International Civil Aviation Organization (ICAO), a specialized agency of the United Nations, from 2020 to 2025.

In 2010, Sciacchitano was appointed Executive Secretary of the European Civil Aviation Conference (ECAC). In February 2019, he joined the Delegation of Italy to ICAO. He was elected President of the ICAO Council on 1 January 2020. In October 2022, he was re-elected for a second three-year term by acclamation.

== Career ==
Siaccchitano started at the Italian Civil Aviation Authority (RAI) in 1980, quickly rose through the ranks, becoming Technical Director in 1995 and Director General of the organization in 1996.

In 1999, he became Deputy Director General of the newly created National Civil Aviation Authority (ENAC). In 2010, he moved to the European Civil Aviation Conference (ECAC) in Neuilly-sur-Seine, near Paris, as Executive Director. He also held numerous international positions, including chairing the Standing Committee of the European Organisation for the Safety of Air Navigation (EUROCONTROL) in Brussels, representing Italy on the Management Board of the European Union Aviation Safety Agency (EASA) in Cologne, and coordinating the Italian delegation to the ICAO General Assembly.

Since 2019, he represented Italy on the Council of the International Civil Aviation Organization (ICAO) in Montreal. On January 1, 2020, Sciacchitano succeeded Olumuyiwa Benard Aliu as the sixth President of the ICAO Council. In November 2025, Toshiyuki Onuma of Japan was elected as president of the International Civil Aviation Organization Council for a three-year term beginning January 2026, replacing Sciacchitano.

== Personal life ==
Sciacchitano is married and has two children. He speaks fluent Italian, English, and French.

== Honors ==
- 2006 “Golden AOPA Award” from the Italian pilots' association AOPA
- 2009 “Paul Tissandier Diploma” from the Fédération Aéronautique Internationale (FAI)
- 2016 Flight Safety Foundation Award
- 2017 Air Transport News Lifetime Achievement Award
- 2026 Public Service Star
