= List of international organization leaders in 2006 =

The following is a list of international organization leaders in 2006.

== UN organizations ==
Organization	Title	Leader	Country	In office	Ref
Food and Agriculture Organization	Director-general	Jacques Diouf	Senegal	1994-2011	
International Atomic Energy Agency	Director-general	Mohamed ElBaradei	Egypt	1997-2009	
International Civil Aviation Organization	President of the Council	Assad Kotaite	Lebanon	1976-2006	
International Civil Aviation Organization	President of the Council	Roberto Kobeh González	Mexico	2006-2013	
International Civil Aviation Organization	Secretary-general	Taïeb Chérif	Algeria	2003-2009	
International Labour Organization	Director-general	Juan Somavía	Chile	1999–2012	
United Nations	Secretary-general	Kofi Annan	Ghana	1997-2006	
United Nations	President of the General Assembly	Jan Eliasson	Sweden	2005-2006	
United Nations	President of the General Assembly	Haya Rashed Al-Khalifa	Bahrain	2006-2007	
United Nations	United Nations Security Council members		China, France, Russia, United Kingdom, United States (permanent members); Argentina, Denmark, Greece, Japan, Tanzania (elected for 2005–2006); Congo, Ghana, Peru, Qatar, Slovakia (elected for 2006–2007)		
United Nations	United Nations Children's Fund (UNICEF) Executive Director	Ann Veneman	United States	2005–2010	
United Nations	United Nations Educational, Scientific and Cultural Organization (UNESCO) director-general	Kōichirō Matsuura	Japan	1999-2009	
United Nations	United Nations High Commissioner for Human Rights	Louise Arbour	Canada	2004-2008	
United Nations	United Nations High Commissioner for Refugees (UNHCR)	António Guterres	Portugal	2005–2015	
United Nations	United Nations Industrial Development Organization (UNIDO) director-general	Kandeh Yumkella	Sierra Leone	2005–2013	
United Nations	World Food Programme (WFP) Executive Director	James T. Morris	United States	2002-2006	
United Nations	World Food Programme (WFP) Executive Director	Josette Sheeran	United States	2006–2012	
United Nations	World Health Organization (WHO) director-general	Lee Jong-wook	South Korea	2004-2006	
United Nations	World Health Organization (WHO) director-general	Anders Nordström	Sweden	2006 (acting)	
United Nations	World Health Organization (WHO) director-general	Margaret Chan	China	2006–2017	
World Meteorological Organization (WMO)	President	Alexander Bedritsky	Russia	2003–2011	
World Meteorological Organization (WMO)	Secretary-general	Michel Jarraud	France	2004–2015	
World Tourism Organization (UNWTO)	Secretary-general	Francesco Frangialli	Jordan	1997-2009	

== Political and economic organizations ==
Organization	Title	Leader	Country	In office	Ref			
African, Caribbean and Pacific Group of States (ACP)	Secretary-general	John Kaputin	Papua New Guinea	2005–2010				
African Union	Chairperson	Olusegun Obasanjo	Nigeria	2004-2006				
African Union	Chairperson	Denis Sassou Nguesso	Republic of the Congo	2006-2007				
African Union	Chairperson of the Commission	Alpha Oumar Konaré	Mali	2003-2008 (first Chairperson)				
African Union	President of the Pan-African Parliament	Gertrude Mongella	Tanzania	2004-2008 (first President)				
Andean Community	Secretary-general	Allan Wagner Tizón	Peru	2004-2006				
Andean Community	Secretary-general	Alfredo Fuentes Hernández	Colombia	2006-2007 (interim)				
Arab League	Secretary-general	Amr Moussa	Egypt	2001–2011				
Arab Maghreb Union	Secretary-general	Habib Boularès	Tunisia	2002-2006				
Arab Maghreb Union	Secretary-general	Habib Ben Yahia	Tunisia	2006–2016				
Asia-Pacific Economic Cooperation (APEC)	Executive director	Tran Trong Toan	Vietnam	2006				
Association of Southeast Asian Nations (ASEAN)	Secretary-general	Ong Keng Yong	Singapore	2003-2007				
Caribbean Community	Secretary-general	Edwin Carrington	Trinidad and Tobago	1992–2010				
Central American Parliament (PARLACEN)	President	Julio Enrique Palacios Sambrano	Panama	2005-2006				
Central American Parliament (PARLACEN)	President	Ciro Cruz Zepeda	El Salvador	2006-2007				
Common Market of East and Southern Africa (COMESA)	Secretary-general	Erastus J. O. Mwencha	Kenya	1998-2008				
Commonwealth of Nations	Head	Queen Elizabeth II	United Kingdom	1952–present				
Commonwealth of Nations	Secretary-general	Don McKinnon	New Zealand	2000-2008				
Commonwealth of Independent States	Executive Secretary	Vladimir Rushailo	Russia	2004-2007				
Council of Europe	Secretary General	Terry Davis	United Kingdom	2004-2009				
Council of Europe	President of the Parliamentary Assembly of the Council of Europe (PACE)	René van der Linden	Netherlands	2005-2008				
Council of Europe	President of the European Court of Human Rights (first President)	Luzius Wildhaber	Switzerland	1998-2007				
East African Community	Secretary-general	Amanya Mushega	Uganda	2001-2006				
East African Community	Secretary-general	Juma Volter Mwapachu	Tanzania	2006–2011				
Economic Community of West African States (ECOWAS)	President of the Commission	Mohamed Ibn Chambas	Ghana	2006–2010 (first President)				
Economic Community of West African States (ECOWAS)	Chairman	Mamadou Tandja	Niger	2005-2007				
Eurasian Economic Community	Secretary-general	Grigory Rapota	Russia	2001-2007				
Eurasian Economic Community	Chairman of the Interstate Council	Nursultan Nazarbayev	Kazakhstan	2001-2014				
European Free Trade Association	Secretary-general	William Rossier	Switzerland	2000-2006				
European Free Trade Association	Secretary-general	Kåre Bryn	Norway	2006–2012				
European Union (EU)	Presidency of the European Council	Wolfgang Schüssel	Austria	2006				
European Union (EU)	Presidency of the European Council	Matti Vanhanen	Finland	2006		Presidency of the Council of the European Union	Austria	2006
European Union (EU)		Finland				Presidency of the Council of the European Union		2006
European Union (EU)	President of the European Commission	José Manuel Barroso	Portugal	2004–2014				
European Union (EU)	President of the European Parliament	Josep Borrell	Spain/Argentina	2004-2007				
European Union (EU)	Secretary-General of the Council	Javier Solana	Spain	1999-2009				
European Union (EU)	High Representative for the Common Foreign and Security Policy	Javier Solana	Spain	1999-2009				
European Union (EU)	President of the European Central Bank	Jean-Claude Trichet	France	2003–2011				
European Union (EU)	European Ombudsman	Nikiforos Diamandouros	Greece	2003–2013				
European Union (EU)	President of the Committee of the Regions (CoR)	Peter Straub	Germany	2004-2006				
European Union (EU)	President of the Committee of the Regions (CoR)	Michel Delebarre	France	2006-2008				
European Union (EU)	President of the European Investment Bank (EIB)	Philippe Maystadt	Belgium	2000–2011				
European Union (EU)	President of the European Court of Justice (ECJ)	Vassilios Skouris	Greece	2003–2015				
European Union (EU)	President of the European Court of Auditors (ECA)	Hubert Weber	Austria	2005-2008				
European Union (EU)	President of the European Economic and Social Committee (EESC)	Anne-Marie Sigmund	Austria	2004-2006				
European Union (EU)	President of the European Economic and Social Committee (EESC)	Dimitris Dimitriadis	Greece	2006-2008				
European Union (EU)	Gulf Cooperation Council	Secretary-general	Abdul Rahman bin Hamad Al Attiyah	Qatar	2002–2011			
Ibero-American General Secretariat (SEGIB)	Secretary-general	Enrique V. Iglesias	Uruguay	2005–2013 (first Secretary-General)				
Indian Ocean Commission	Secretary-general	Monique Andréas Esoavelomandroso	Madagascar	2004-2008				
Non-Aligned Movement (NAM)	Chairman	Abdullah Ahmad Badawi	Malaysia	2003-2006				
Non-Aligned Movement (NAM)	Chairman	Fidel Castro	Cuba	2006-2008				
Non-Aligned Movement (NAM)	Chairman	Raúl Castro	Cuba	2006-2009				
Nordic Council	President	Ole Stavad	Denmark	2006				
Nordic Council	Secretary-general	Frida Nokken	Norway	1999-2007				
North Atlantic Treaty Organization (NATO)	Secretary-general	Jaap de Hoop Scheffer	Denmark	2004-2009				
Organisation for Economic Co-operation and Development (OECD)	Secretary-general	Don Johnston	Canada	1996-2006				
Organisation for Economic Co-operation and Development (OECD)	Secretary-general	José Ángel Gurría	Mexico	2006–2021				
Organization for Security and Co-operation in Europe (OSCE)	Secretary-general	Marc Perrin de Brichambaut	France	2005–2011				
Organization for Security and Co-operation in Europe (OSCE)	Chairman-in-Office	Karel De Gucht	Belgium	2006				
Organization for Security and Co-operation in Europe (OSCE)	High Commissioner on National Minorities	Rolf Ekéus	Sweden	2001-2007				
Organization of American States	Secretary-general	José Miguel Insulza	Chile	2005-2015				
Organisation of Eastern Caribbean States	Director-general	Len Ishmael	Saint Lucia	2003–2013				
Organisation of the Islamic Conference (OIC)	Secretary-general	Ekmeleddin İhsanoğlu	Turkey	2005–2013				
Pacific Community (SPC)	Director-general	Lourdes Pangelinan	Guam	2000-2006				
Pacific Community (SPC)	Director-general	Jimmie Rodgers	Solomon Islands	2006–2014				
Pacific Islands Forum	Secretary-general	Greg Urwin	Australia	2004-2008				
Shanghai Cooperation Organisation (SCO)	Executive Secretary	Zhang Deguang	China	2004-2006				
South Asian Association for Regional Cooperation (SAARC)	Secretary-general	Chenkyab Dorji	Bhutan	2005-2008				
Southern Cone Common Market (Mercosur)	Director of the Executive Secretariat			?-2008				
Southern African Development Community	Executive Secretary	Tomaz Salomão	Mozambique	2005–2013				
Unrepresented Nations and Peoples Organization (UNPO)	Secretary-general	Marino Busdachin	Italy	2003-2018				
Western European Union	Secretary-general	Javier Solana	Spain	1999-2009				
World Trade Organization (WTO)	Director-general	Pascal Lamy	France	2005–2013				

== Financial organizations ==
Organization	Title	Leader	Country	In office	Ref
African Development Bank	President	Donald Kaberuka	Rwanda	2005–2015	
Asian Development Bank	President	Haruhiko Kuroda	Japan	2005–2013	
European Bank for Reconstruction and Development	President	Jean Lemierre	France	2000-2008	
Inter-American Development Bank (IADB)	President	Luis Alberto Moreno	Colombia	2005–2020	
International Monetary Fund	Managing director	Rodrigo Rato	Spain	2004-2007	
Islamic Development Bank (IDB)	President	Ahmed Mohammed Ali Al-Madani	Saudi Arabia	1975–present	
World Bank	President	Paul Wolfowitz	United States	2005-2007	

== Sports organizations ==
Organization	President	Country	In office	Ref
Asian Football Confederation (AFC)	Mohamed bin Hammam	Qatar	2002–2011	
Badminton World Federation (BWF)	Kang Young-joong	South Korea	2005-2013	
Confédération africaine de football (CAF)	Issa Hayatou	Cameroon	1988-2017	
Confederation of North, Central American and Caribbean Association Football (CONCACAF)	Jack A. Warner	Trinidad and Tobago	1990–2011	
Confederación Sudamericana de Fútbol (CONMEBOL)	Nicolás Leoz	Paraguay	1986–2013	
Fédération internationale de basket-ball	Carl Ching Men-ky	China	2002-2006	
Fédération internationale de basket-ball	Robert Elphinston	Australia	2006-2010	
Fédération Internationale de Football Association (FIFA)	Sepp Blatter	Switzerland	1998–2015	
Fédération Internationale de Gymnastique (FIG)	Bruno Grandi	Italy	1996-2016	
Fédération internationale de natation (FINA)	Mustapha Larfaoui	Algeria	1988-2009	
Fédération Internationale de Volleyball (FIVB)	Rubén Acosta	Mexico	1984-2008	
Fédération Internationale des Sociétés d'Aviron (FISA)	Denis Oswald	Switzerland	1989-2014	
Fédération Équestre Internationale (FEI)	Infanta Pilar, Duchess of Badajoz	Spain	1994-2006	
Fédération Équestre Internationale (FEI)	Princess Haya bint Hussein	Jordan	2006-2014	
Fédération Internationale d'Escrime (FIE)	René Roch	France	1993-2008	
International Blind Sports Federation (IBSA)	Michael Barredo	Philippines	2005-2013	
International Association of Athletics Federations	Lamine Diack	Senegal	1999-2015	
International Boxing Association (IBA)	Anwar Chowdhry	Pakistan	1986-2006	
International Boxing Association (IBA)	Kaner Doganeli	Turkey	2006 (acting)	
International Boxing Association (IBA)	Wu Ching-kuo	Taiwan	2006-2017	
International Cricket Council (ICC)	Ehsan Mani	Pakistan	2003-2006	
International Cricket Council (ICC)	Percy Sonn	South Africa	2006-2007	
International Handball Federation (IHF)	Hassan Moustafa	Egypt	2000–present	
International Hockey Federation (FIIH)	René Fasel	Switzerland	1994-2021	
International Judo Federation (IJF)	Park Yong-sung	South Korea	1995-2007	
International Olympic Committee (IOC)	Jacques Rogge	Belgium	2001–2013	
International Paralympic Committee (IPC)	Philip Craven	United Kingdom	2001–2017	
International Rugby Board (IRB)	Syd Millar	Northern Ireland	2003-2007	
International Sailing Federation (ISAF)	Göran Petersson	Sweden	2004-2012	
International Shooting Sport Federation (ISSF)	Olegario Vázquez Raña	Mexico	1980-2018	
International Table Tennis Federation (ITTF)	Adham Sharara	Canada	1999-2014	
International Tennis Federation (ITF)	Francesco Ricci Bitti	Italy	1999-2015	
World Taekwondo Federation (WTF)	Chungwon Choue	South Korea	2004–present	
International Triathlon Union (ITU)	Les McDonald	United Kingdom/Canada	1989-2008	

== Other organizations ==
Organization	Title	Leader	Country	In office	Ref
Antarctic Treaty	Executive Secretary	Jan Huber	Netherlands	2004-2009 (first Executive Secretary)	
Colombo Plan	Secretary-general	Kittipan Kanjanapipatkul	Thailand	2003-2007	
Community of Portuguese Language Countries (CPLP)	Executive Secretary	Luís de Matos Monteiro da Fonseca	Cape Verde	2004-2008	
La Francophonie	Secretary-general	Abdou Diouf	Senegal	2003–2014	
Intergovernmental Authority on Development (IGAD)	Executive Secretary	Attalla Bashir	Sudan	2000-2008	
International Committee of the Red Cross	President	Jakob Kellenberger	Switzerland	2000–2012	
International Court of Justice	Presidents	Shi Jiuyong	China	2003-2006	
International Court of Justice	Presidents	Rosalyn Higgins	United Kingdom	2006-2009	
International Criminal Court	President	Philippe Kirsch	Canada	2003-2009 (first President)	
International Criminal Police Organization (Interpol)	Secretary-general	Ronald Noble	United States	2000-2014	
International Criminal Police Organization (Interpol)	President	Jackie Selebi	South Africa	2004-2008	
International Federation of Red Cross and Red Crescent Societies (IFRC)	President	Juan Manuel Suárez Del Toro Rivero	Spain	2001-2009	
International Maritime Organization	Secretary-general	Efthimios E. Mitropoulos	Greece	2004–2011	
International Organization for Migration (IOM)	Director-general	Brunson McKinley	United States	1998-2008	
International Telecommunication Union	Secretary-general	Yoshio Utsumi	Japan	1998-2006	
Organisation for the Prohibition of Chemical Weapons (OPCW)	Director-general	Rogelio Pfirter	Argentina	2002–2010	
Organization of the Petroleum Exporting Countries (OPEC)	Secretary-general	Edmund Daukoru	Nigeria	2006	
Universal Postal Union	Director-general	Édouard Dayan	France	2005–2013	
World Intellectual Property Organization (WIPO)	Director-general	Kamil Idris	Sudan	1997-2008	

== See also ==
- List of state leaders in 2006
- List of religious leaders in 2006
- List of colonial governors in 2006
- List of international organization leaders in 2005
- List of international organization leaders in 2007
