= International organization leaders by year =

This is a list of international organization leaders in any given year.

== Twenty-first century ==
2017 - 2016 - 2015 - 2014 - 2013 - 2012 - 2011 - 2010 - 2009 - 2008 - 2007 - 2006 - 2005 - 2004 - 2003 - 2002 - 2001
