= Prega Ramsamy =

2nd Executive Secretary of SADC
- In office 2001–2005
- Preceded by: Kaire Mbuende
- Succeeded by: Tomaz Salomão

Personal details
- Born: Pakeereesamy Ramsamy; 5 May 1950 (age 76) Rose-Hill, Mauritius
- Spouse: Novia Ramsamy (1950)
- Children: Natacha Ramsamy (1979) and Katiana Sandra Ramsamy (1984)
- Education: University of Delhi (BA)
- Profession: Former CEO of Finmark Trust

Prega Ramsamy (born 5 May 1950) served as the second Executive Secretary of the Southern African Development Community. He is from Mauritius and has lived in Zambia, Botswana, Madagascar and South Africa.

Ramsamy joined FinMark Trust in 2012 as CEO. Ramsamy was the head of the trade division at the COMESA Secretariat in Zambia working on trade promotion and facilitation and also contributed to the establishment of the PTA Bank to finance and foster trade, socio-economic development and regional economic integration and PTA Clearing House to facilitate payments of trade and services in local currencies (ii) the Executive Secretary of Southern African Development Community (SADC) in Botswana where he was involved in cementing the process of economic integration in Southern Africa and advising policy makers on regulatory reforms and protocol implementation for economic growth (iii) the CEO of the Economic Development Board of Madagascar (EDBM) which was responsible for private sector development and investment promotion (iv) the Special Adviser to the State President of Madagascar for economic affairs (v) Head of Business for Development (B4D) Unit which focusses on inclusive business development at the Southern Africa Trust.

He provided policy and strategic advice to both the private and public sectors in the SADC region. Ramsamy holds a PhD in Development Economics, an MBA degree, a Diploma Poste-Universitaire and a BA (Hons) Economics and is fluent in both English and French.

Ramsamy married Novia (née Mounsmie) in 1978. They have two daughters, Natacha Ramsamy and Katiana Sandra Ramsamy. Natacha lives in Mauritius and is a business owner, currently working at Evolution . Katiana lives in South Africa and worked for the Southern Africa Trust as a Project Manager. She also worked at the University of Witwatersrand, where she obtained a PhD in International Relations. Both Natacha and Katiana studied at the University of Cape Town.
