= Peter Schieder =

Austrian politician (1941 - 2013)

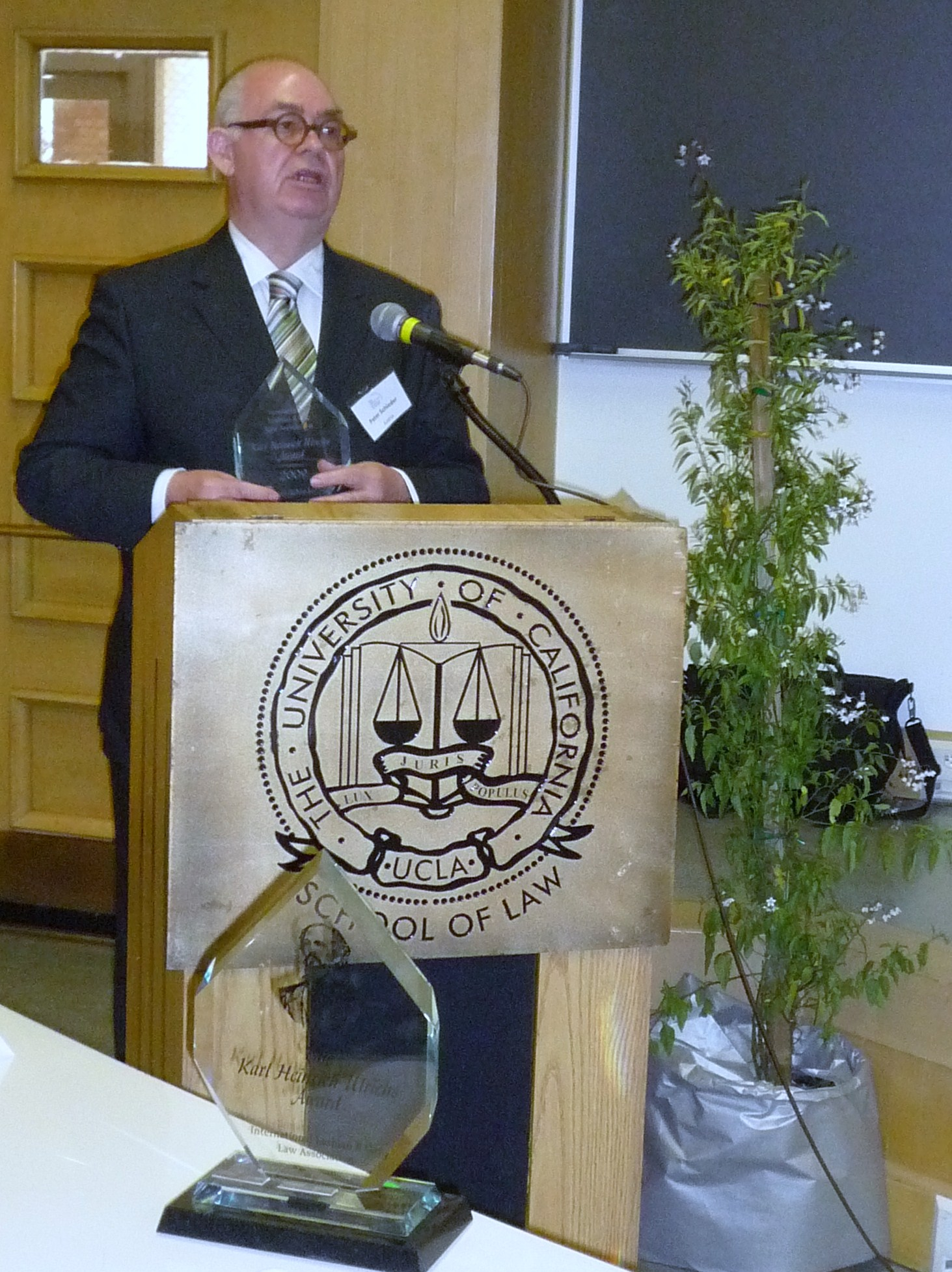
Peter Schieder after receiving the Karl Heinrich Ulrichs Award from ILGLaw (2009)

Peter Schieder (20 August 1941 – 11 October 2013) was an Austrian politician of the Socialist Party of Austria (SPÖ) and Chairman of the Socialist Youth Austria (SJÖ).

== Early life and political career ==
Peter Schieder, born in Vienna, attended primary school and secondary school before beginning studies in law, which he did not complete.

Schieder began his career as a journalist. He worked as a film critic (1961–1962) and editor-in-chief (1962–1964) of the magazine "Trotzdem" of the Socialist Youth Austria. From 1970 to 1973, Schieder was the managing director of WVG-Verlags.

Schieder's party career began in the SJÖ, of which he was chairman from 1964 to 1972. Schieder was also active as a youth functionary at the European and international levels. From 1964 to 1972, he served as a member of the executive committee of the International Union of Socialist Youth (IUSY) and from 1969 to 1971 as president of the World Youth Assembly.

He then worked until 1984 as executive city councillor for the environment in the Vienna city government. From 1984 to 1988, he served as general secretary of the SPÖ. For many years, the politician was a member of the Vienna state party executive and the federal party executive of the SPÖ.

He held a mandate in the Austrian National Council for more than 25 years (1970–1973 and 1984–2006). From 1994, he was the foreign policy spokesman for the SPÖ and chairman of the foreign affairs committee of the National Council. When he left the National Council on October 29, 2006, he was the longest serving member of parliament. For 22 years, from 1971 until the end of 1973 and from 1987 until the beginning of 2007, he was a member of the Parliamentary Assembly of the Council of Europe, its president from 2002 to 2005, chairman of its Socialist Group from 1995 to 2002, and until his death in 2013, honorary president of the assembly.

He was also a member of the board of trustees (now: board of directors) of the ORF for 27 years (1974–2001).

From 1995 to 2002, Schieder was district chairman of the SPÖ in Vienna-Penzing (14th district) and was succeeded in this position by his son Andreas Schieder (* 1969), who was also state secretary in the Ministry of Finance of the Faymann I government at the time and was the top candidate of the SPÖ for the 2019 European Parliament elections.

Vienna Central Cemetery: Memorial grave of Peter Schieder In 2004, he was awarded an honorary doctorate in political science by the University of Bucharest. On March 14, 2009, at an international conference in West Hollywood, the International Lesbian and Gay Law Association (ILGLaw) awarded him the Karl Heinrich Ulrichs Award, which is presented every three years, for his services. As a young member of parliament in 1971, he was significantly involved in the repeal of the total ban on homosexuality in Austria and made LGBTI rights one of his priorities in his inaugural address as president of the Parliamentary Assembly of the Council of Europe. Since 2008, Peter Schieder was president of the International Institute for Peace.

Peter Schieder died on October 11, 2013, after a serious illness in Vienna. Federal President Heinz Fischer praised his friend Schieder in a statement. "Democracy, justice, and international cooperation" were always the political guiding principles of the deceased, according to Fischer. Schieder was buried in an honorary grave at the Vienna Central Cemetery.

== Awards and honors ==
- Grand Golden Decoration of Honor with Sash for Services to the Republic of Austria (2005)
- Grand Silver Decoration of Honor with Star for Services to the Republic of Austria
- Grand Golden Decoration of Honor for Services to the Republic of Austria
- Grand Golden Decoration of Honor for Services to the City of Vienna
- Commander of the Spanish Order of Isabella the Catholic
- Officer of the Hungarian Order of Merit
- Grand Cross of the Star of Romania
- Ukrainian Order of Saint Demetrius of Thessaloniki
- Karl Heinrich Ulrichs Award from the International Lesbian, Gay, Bisexual, Transgender & Intersex Law Association (ILGLaw, 2008)
- Honorary President of the Parliamentary Assembly of the Council of Europe
