= Omar Kabbaj =

Moroccan businessman and diplomat (born 1942)

6th President of the African Development Bank
- In office 1 September 1995 – 1 September 2005
- Preceded by: Babacar Ndiaye
- Succeeded by: Donald Kaberuka

Personal details
- Born: 15 August 1942 (age 83) Rabat, Morocco

Omar Kabbaj is Advisor to His Majesty King Mohammed VI of Morocco since 22 June 2006. He was the President of the African Development Bank from 26 August 1995 to 1 September 2005. Before that, he was a member of the board of the International Monetary Fund (1980–1993) and member of the board of directors of the World Bank (1979–1980) and minister delegate to the prime minister of Morocco, in charge of affairs economic, from 1993 to 1995. Omar Kabbaj is also a Knight of the Order of the Throne of Morocco. He holds a master's degree in management from Toulouse Business School.

== Education and career ==
Omar Kabbaj graduated from the Toulouse Business School (Class of 1963).

He began his career in July 1963 at the Bureau de Recherches et de Participation Minières (BRPM) as the head of the mineral marketing department in the investment division of this organization.

In 1966, he was recruited to the National Bank for Economic Development (BNDE) first as an attaché in the credit control department. He was then appointed Director of the financial department of this institution.

In 1970, he was appointed by King Hassan II as General Director of the National Sugar Factory of Tadla (SUNAT), where he oversaw its construction and presided over the launch of its activities. Simultaneously, Kabbaj was attached to the general secretariat of the Ministry of commerce, Industry, Mines, and Merchant Marine.

In 1974, King Hassan II appointed Omar Kabbaj as the general director of the National Sugarcane Factory of Sebou (SUNACAS), the first sugarcane factory in Morocco, while also assigning him a mission at the cabinet of the Minister of Commerce, Industry, Mines, and Merchant Marine.

In 1977, he was appointed chief of staff to the Minister of Finance, a position he held until 1979, when he joined the World Bank Group as a member of its board of directors, representing, in addition to Morocco, Algeria, Tunisia, Libya, Iran, Ghana, Oman, Afghanistan, and Yemen.

In 1980, he was appointed a member of the board of directors of the International Monetary Fund (IMF), representing Morocco, Algeria, Tunisia, Iran, Ghana, Oman, and Afghanistan.

In 1993, he was appointed Minister Delegate to the Prime Minister, in charge of economic incentives, a position where he was responsible for economic affairs, as well as planning and statistics services. In this capacity, he was responsible for organizing and conducting the 1994 general population census.

In 1995, at the proposal of King Hassan II, Omar Kabbaj was elected President of the African Development Bank (ADB), which he revitalized and deeply reformed after the severe crisis faced by this pan-African institution.

In 2000, and at the proposal of King Mohammed VI, he was unanimously and acclamation re-elected as the head of the African Development Bank group.

In 2005, at the end of this second term, Omar Kabbaj was elected by the institution's board of governors as Honorary President of the AFDB.

On June 22, 2006, Omar Kabbaj was appointed Counselor to His Majesty King Mohammed VI at The Royal Cabinet.

He is also a member of the advisory board to the UN Secretary-General on water and sanitation (UNSGAB). This appointment was made on the proposal of His Royal Highness the Prince of Orange, Crown Prince of the Netherlands and President of this committee. Omar Kabbaj is also a member of the Board of Directors of the French Development Agency (AFD).

Omar Kabbaj is a knight of the Order of the Throne of Morocco, as well as The Highest Tunisian and Burkinabé décorations. He was also the subject of a motion of congratulations and encouragement from the United States House of Representatives for his work at the head of the African Development Bank.
