= Q. A. M. A. Rahim =

Bangladeshi diplomat

Q.A.M.A. Rahim

High Commissioner of Bangladesh to Pakistan
- In office 3 November 1993 – 9 August 1998
- Preceded by: M. Anwar Hashim
- Succeeded by: Masum Ahmed Chowdhury

Q.A.M.A. Rahim (died on 4 June 2021) was a Bangladeshi diplomat who served as the seventh secretary-general of the South Asian Association for Regional Cooperation from January 11, 2002, to February 28, 2005. He served as Bangladesh's High Commissioner to Pakistan from November 1993 to August 1998.

Rahim was born in Naogaon District.

Rahim died on 4 June 2021 in Uttara, Dhaka. His wife and two children live in the United States.
