= Tadao Chino =

Japanese civil servant

- 千野 忠男

7th President of the Asian Development Bank
- In office 16 January 1999 – 1 February 2005
- Preceded by: Mitsuo Sato
- Succeeded by: Haruhiko Kuroda

Personal details
- Born: 21 January 1934 Fujieda, Shizuoka, Japan
- Died: 17 July 2008 (aged 74) Tokyo, Japan
- Education: University of Tokyo; Stanford University
- Occupation: Civil servant

Tadao Chino (千野 忠男; 16 January 1934 – 7 July 2008) was a Japanese civil servant who served as the President of the Asian Development Bank from January 16, 1999 to February 1, 2005.

On July 17, 2008, Chino, 74, died in Tokyo, Japan, due to liver failure.

Positions in intergovernmental organisations
Preceded by Mitsuo Sato	President of the Asian Development Bank; 1999–2005	Succeeded by Haruhiko Kuroda
