= Peter Straub (politician) =

Peter Karl Otto Straub (born 8 September 1939) is a politician from Germany, and served as president of the Committee of the Regions (CoR) of the European Union (EU) from 2004 to 2006.

== Background and family life ==
Straub was born in the town of Waldshut-Tiengen in the Waldshut kreis (district) of Germany. He obtained his A-levels in Waldshut, and studied jurisprudence in Freiburg and Munich. He has been active as an independent attorney in his hometown since 1966.

== Early political career ==
Straub joined the Christian Democratic Union (CDU) in 1968. He was a town councillor of Waldshut-Tiengen from 1968 to 1989, and a Mitglied des Kreistags (member of the Waldshut District Council) from 1984 to 1999.

In November 1984, he became a member of the federal state parliament of Baden-Wuerttemberg. He served as deputy president of the land parliament from 1992, until he was elected as president in June 1996.

== Career within the Committee of the Regions ==
Straub was an alternate member of the CoR from 1997 until he was appointed as a full member in 2003. In 1999, he became a representative of the European People's Party (EPP) parliamentary group and chairman of the ad hoc Geschäftsordnung Kommission (Commission on the Rules of Procedure).

In 2000 he became a representative ad personam for the then Prime Minister of Baden-Wuerttemberg, Erwin Teufel, on the AktiounsKomitee fir Demokratie a Rentegerechtegkeet (AdR). He was elected as the CoR's First Vice-President at the entity's plenary session in Brussels on 19 November 2003, and later served as a member of the Commission for Constitutional Affairs and European Governance and the Commission for Economic and Social Policy.

Straub again served as the representative of the EPP parliamentary group in the 2004 Commission on the Rules of Procedure, regarding the EU extension. On 11 February 2004, he was elected as president of the Committee of the Regions. He was succeeded by Michel Delebarre in February 2006.

== Other European political functions ==
Straub has been a member of the Versammlung der Regionen Europas (VRE), the Assembly of European Regions (AER) since 1996. In 2002, he became the AER vice-president and president of its Committee for Constitutional Affairs. Since 1998, he has been a member in the standing committee of the Conference of European Regional Legislative Assemblies, or Conférence des Assemblées législatives régionales d'Europe (CALRE).

Preceded by Fritz Hopmeier	Presidents of the Landtag of Baden-Württemberg; 1996–	Succeeded by -
