= Luzius Wildhaber =

Swiss judge (1937–2020)

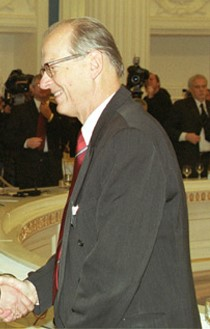

Judge of the European Court of Human Rights
- In office 1991–1998
- In office 1998 – 2007 (President of the ECHR)

Judge in Liechtenstein
- In office 1975–1988

Personal details
- Born: 18 January 1937 Basel, Switzerland
- Died: 22 July 2020 (aged 83)

Luzius Wildhaber (18 January 1937, Basel, Switzerland – 22 July 2020) was a Swiss judge. He was the first president of the European Court of Human Rights in its new format after the ratification of Protocol 11, which opened up direct access for citizens from the 47 member states of the Council of Europe.

== Education ==
He studied law at the University of Basel, and Yale where he obtained a Master of Laws in 1965 and Doctor in Juridical Science in 1968.

== Professional career ==
He became a professor of law at the University of Fribourg in 1971. He was a judge in Liechtenstein between 1975 and 1988 and a lecturer on international law and constitutional law at the University of Basel in 1977 and 1998. At the university he served as professor, dean and rector at different times. He was elected a judge of the European Court of Human rights in 1991 and served as its president from 1 November 1998 to 18 January 2007. He died on 22 July 2020.

== Awards and recognition ==
- 1999 Marcel Benoist Prize
- 2000 Honorary Doctorate of the Comenius University
- 2004 Honorary Doctorate of the University of Neuchâtel
- 2009 Anna Göldi Human Rights Award
