= Lourdes Pangelinan =

Guamanian public official

Director-General of Secretariat of the Pacific Community
- In office 6 January 2000 – 5 January 2006
- Preceded by: Robert B. Dun
- Succeeded by: Jimmie Rodgers

Personal details
- Born: 19 October 1954 (age 71) Guam
- Education: University of California, Davis

Lourdes T. Pangelinan (born 19 October 1954) was the first female director general of the Secretariat of the Pacific Community.

Pangelinan was born in 1954 in Guam and grew up in the village of Asan. She attended the Adelup Elementary School, and in 1966 her family moved to California, where she attended Castro Valley High School. She received a degree in international relations from the University of California, Davis in 1976. She took an additional year of postgraduate study in France. Following her graduation she worked as a journalist with the Pacific Daily News in Guam.

In 1979 she was appointed Special Assistant to the Lieutenant Governor of Guam. She was based in San Francisco until 1984 when she returned to Guam to work for the Office of the Governor of Guam, holding the position of Chief of Staff from 1987–1994. She then worked as Director of Communications for the Superior Court of Guam, in Hagåtña, until 1996.

On 6 January 2000, Pangelinan became the first female Director-General of the Secretariat of the Pacific Community. She was reappointed twice and led the organisation until 5 January 2006, having held three two year terms. Previously had been Deputy Director-General of the Secretariat of the Pacific Community since 1996.

Pangelinan continues to work in the Pacific region and was appointed manager for development of the Regional Institutional Framework in 2007 by the Pacific Islands Forum Secretariat.
