= Anwar Chowdhry =

Pakistani sports official

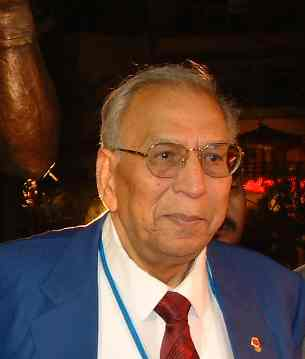
- Born: Anwar Khurshid Chowdhry; 26 October 1924; Jalalpur, Gujrat District, Punjab, British India
- Died: 19 June 2010 (aged 85); KAECHS Society, Baloch Colony, Karachi, Pakistan
- Education: BSc in Electrical and Electronic Engineering, Master of Business Administration

Anwar Khurshid Chowdhry (26 October 1924 – 19 June 2010) was a Pakistani sports official who was president of the International Boxing Association from 1986 to 2006. His career spanned almost three decades in which he made contributions to boxing around the world. He is widely credited with inventing the Computerized Scoring System.

== Biography ==
=== Early life and education ===
Chowdhry was born in Jalalpur Jatan, Punjab, on 26 October 1923. His father name is Major Muhammad Hussain. Basic primary education from Kuchi Memon primary School Saddar Karachi, passed his matriculation examination from Sindh Madrasatul Islam Pilot secondary School Karachi. Intermediate from D.J Sindh Government Science College Karachi and earned his Bachelor of Electrical and Mechanical Engineering degree from the prestigious NED Engineering College, Karachi in 1950.

== Career ==
=== Academic career ===
Chowdhry was offered a lecturer position in the NED Engineering College Karachi in 1950 and served in the capacity till 1958. From 1958 to 1965, he worked as an associate professor and from 1968 to 1977 as a professor. He was also the head of the Mechanical and Engineering Department of NED till his retirement in 1977 (total 27 years' service).

=== Sports career ===
==== Pakistan ====
Chowdhry worked as secretary of the Pakistan Boxing Federation (PBF) from 1959 to 1984 and acted as PBF's president from 1984 to 2004. From 2004 to 2008 he delivered his services as chairman of the PBF. He was also the honorary director of sports at the University of Karachi.

==== International ====
In 1962, Chowdhry laid the foundation of the Asian Boxing Federation and served as its unopposed secretary general from 1962 to 1990. From 1990 till 2006, he remained president of the Asian Boxing Federation.

He also had the distinction to act as International Boxing Association (AIBA) vice-president from 1966 to 1974. From 1974 to 1986, he was the secretary general of the world boxing body. He also remained AIBA President for record 20 years (From 1986 to 2006). He was also declared the best judge of 1964 Tokyo Olympics. On 5 November 2006 he lost the elections at the AIBA Congress at Santo Domingo. Chowdhry was ousted as president of the AIBA by Taiwan's Wu Ching-kuo, who secured 83 votes against Chowdhry's 79. By then, Chowdhry had been elected president of the International Boxing Association for five consecutive terms.

==== International Boxing Scoring System ====
In 1988 Seoul Olympics, Boxing came under strong clouds when Juan Antonio Samaranch, president, International Olympic Committee announced that the future of boxing as an Olympic Sport would be reviewed because of its defective scoring system. Prof. Khurshid Anwar Chowdhry being the president of AIBA, and an engineer by profession, devoted two years and after intensive research invented Computerized Scoring System which was an integral part of the International Boxing Scoring System until 2013.

== Death and funeral ==
Anwar Khurshid Chowdhry died in 2010 at the age of 86 from a heart attack. He is survived by three daughters Dr Sonia Shakeel, Fumi Chowdhry, Mina Chowdhry and his Japanese wife Michiyo Yanagawa Chowdhry.

In a personal message AIBA's president Wu Ching-kuo said, "It's a huge loss for the world’s sports community and especially for boxing." Executive vice-president of AIBA Gafur Rakhimov from Uzbekistan has said that Chowdhry has rendered great services to uplift boxing in the world and he will be greatly missed.

Prominent among those who attended his funeral were president of Pakistan Boxing Federation Doda Khan Bhutto, a number of former Pakistani international boxers who came to limelight when Anwar Chowdhry headed the Pakistan Boxing Federation, former international athlete Muhammad Talib and a large number of friends and admirers. Among a number of international official figures who expressed their sorrow and grief were Kishen Narsi from India, member AIBA executive Committee, Yoo Jae Joon from Seoul Korea, Shbib Mohamed Kamel, president of Syrian Boxing Federation, and member of AIBA Executive Committee, Gafur Rahimov executive vice president of AIBA, Paul King ABA of England and member of AIBA's executive committee, Maher Mohammed Ali Abul from Bahrain, Bashar Mustafa Othaman, Mrs Ekbal Kaisy from Iraqi Boxing Federation, Greg Jek and Jelda and Deza (Greece), Sandy Pino (America), Prof Emil Jecheve (Greece), Prof Aga Jan (Azerbaijan), Manual De Lopus (Philippines), Kithay Harpur (Barbados) and Nieva Emaldnya (Sri Lanka). They all paid rich tributes to him describing his death as a great loss to world boxing.

== Awards ==
Since his youth, Anwar Chowdhry had been closely involved with sports in general and with boxing in particular. Due to his lifelong commitment to the promotion of sport, he is regarded as one of the most decorated sports officials in the world.

The government of Pakistan conferred on him the honour of Sitara-i-Imtiaz (Star of Excellence) in 1999. His Majesty, the King of Thailand conferred the Order of the Direkgunabhorn in recognition of his services for amateur boxing at international level. The governments of Azerbaijan (2001) and Morocco had also honoured Chowdhry with civil awards. For his meritorious services, he has been honoured with some of the highest awards like Merit Award, conferred by the Association of National Olympic Committees, a subsidiary of International Olympic Committee. He was conferred Olympic Order by the International Olympic Committee in 1992.

The Olympic Council of Asia also showered him with an award in 1994. In 1995, he was given an award by UNESCO. The same year, Leonardo Institute of former USSR also conferred on him its rare award. He was also given honorary Doctorate degrees by Azerbaijan University, State University of Uzbekistan, University of Eastern Philippines, and Armenian State Institute of Physical Culture. Kazakh Institute of Physical Education and Sports honoured him with honorary professorship of their institute.

Preceded by (United States) Colonel Don Hull	AIBA President; 1986 – 2006; Retired	Succeeded by (Chinese Taipei) Wu Ching-kuo
