= Park Yong-sung =

South Korean businessman

Park Yong-sung (born September 11, 1940) is a South Korean businessman. From August to November 2005, he was the Chairman of Doosan Group.

== Early life and education ==
He was born in Seoul on 11 September 1940. In 1965, he graduated from Seoul National University with a degree in economics. In 1969, he received an MBA from New York University.

== Career ==
He worked at several companies including Commercial Bank of Korea and Dyongyang Beer.

From 2000 to 2012 he was President of Doosan Heavy Industries & Construction.

In 2005 or 2006, he was given a three year suspended sentence and an $8.5 million fine after being convicted of raising slush funds and inflating balance sheets. He was pardoned in 2007 by Roh Moo-Hyun.

== Other activities ==
He was chairman of the Korea Chamber of Commerce and Industry.

From 1995 to 2007, he was the president of the International Judo Federation.

He was also an IOC member. In March 2006, his membership was suspended before being restored in May 2007.
