= Edwin Carrington =

Trinidadian diplomat & academic

Edwin Wilberforce Carrington
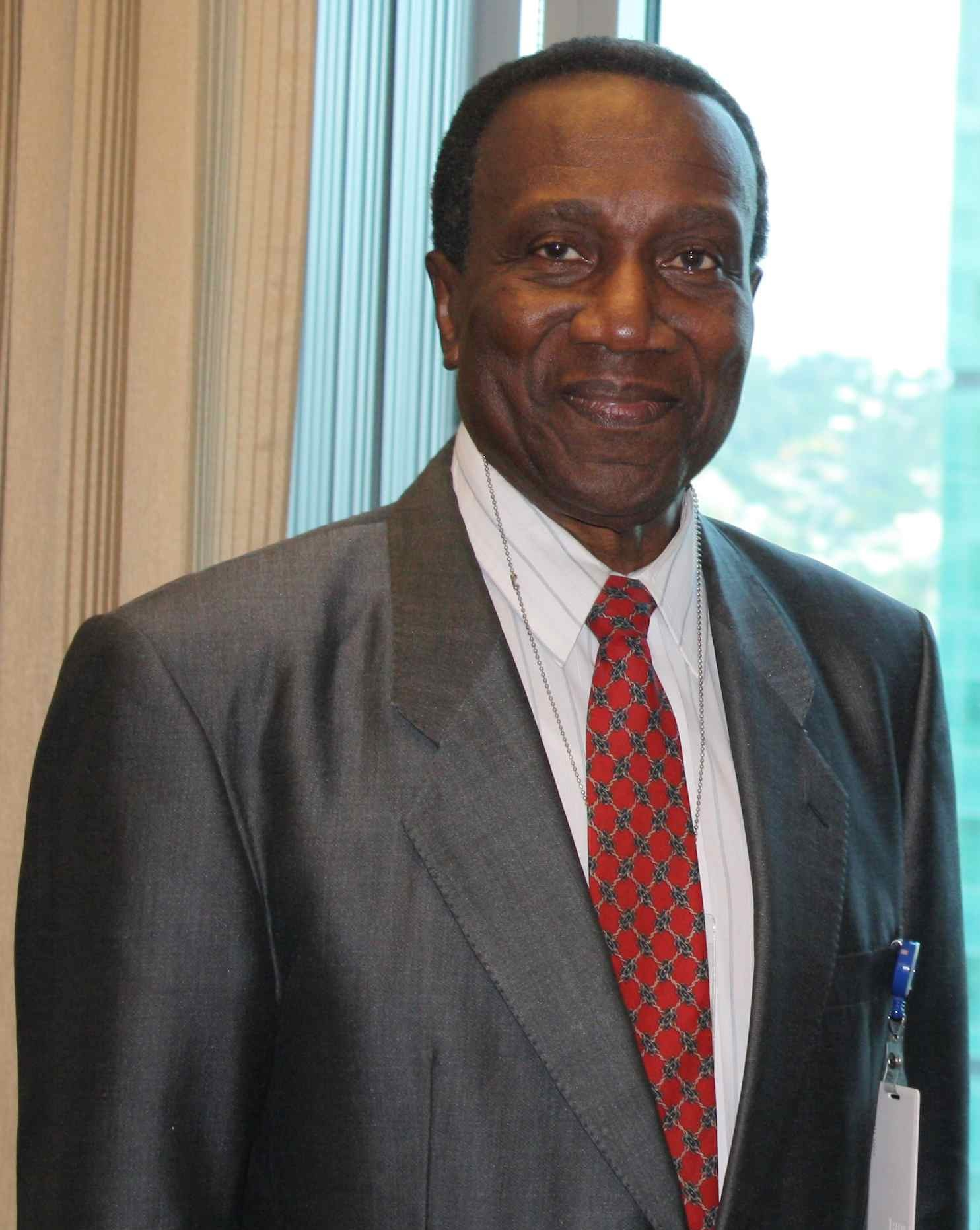

Secretary-General of the Caribbean Community
- In office August 1992 – December 2010
- Preceded by: Roderick Rainford
- Succeeded by: Lolita Applewhaite (acting)

Personal details
- Born: Parlatuvier, Tobago, Trinidad and Tobago

Sir Edwin Wilberforce Carrington, TC, CM, KCN, CHB, OCC is the former Secretary-General of the Caribbean Community (CARICOM), serving from 1992 to 2010.

== Academic career ==
Born in Parlatuvier in Tobago, Carrington attended the University College of the West Indies and McGill University, Montreal, Quebec, Canada, earning a BA degree in economics. He subsequently earned a MA degree in economics from the University of the West Indies. He briefly served as a Junior Research Fellow at the Institute of Social and Economic Research (ISER), University of the West Indies (UWI).

== Diplomatic career ==
Carrington joined the CARIFTA Secretariat, as CARICOM was then called, advancing to the position of Director of the Trade and Integration Division. In 1975, Carrington served as the CARICOM representative during negotiations for the Lomé Convention. From 1985 to 1990, Carrington served as Secretary-General of the African, Caribbean and Pacific Group of States (ACP), previously serving as Deputy Secretary-General from 1977. He became the Secretary-General of the Caribbean Community in August 1992 serving until December 2010. This tenure marks him as the longest serving Secretary-General of the Caribbean Community. Carrington is a member of Washington D.C.–based think tank the Inter-American Dialogue. He currently serves as the Ambassador of Trinidad and Tobago to the Caribbean Community.

== Awards ==
- Knight Commander of the Order of the Nation (KCN) (Antigua and Barbuda)
- Trinity Cross (TC)
- Chaconia Medal (CM)
- Companion of Honour of Barbados (CHB)
- Member of the Order of the Caribbean Community (OCC)
- Grand Cross with Silver Breast Star of the Order of Merit of Duarte, Sánchez and Mella
- The Cacique's Crown of Honour (CCH)
- Honorary Member of the Order of Jamaica (OJ Hon.)
- Grand Cordon of the Honorary Order of the Yellow Star
- Commander of the Order of Civil Merit (Spain)
- Commander of the Order of Merit of the Italian Republic
- Pelican Award, UWIAA Distinguished Alumni Awards (Trinidad and Tobago)
