= Alexander Bedritsky =

Russian scientist

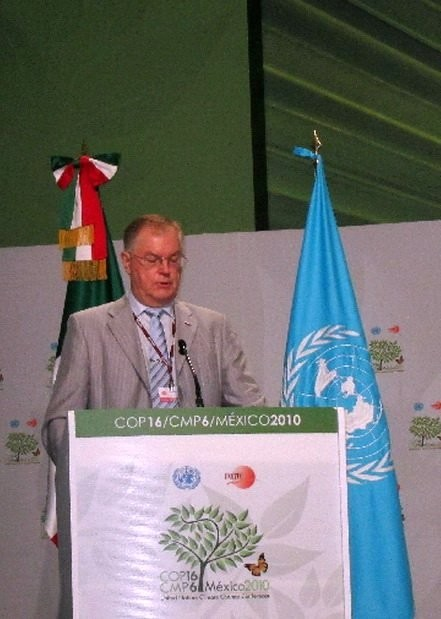
Bedritsky in 2010

Alexander Ivanovich Bedritsky (in Russian: Александр Иванович Бедрицкий; born 10 July 1947) was the former president of the World Meteorological Organization, a position he had held from 2003 to 2011. In 2009 he was appointed as President Dmitry Medvedev's advisor on climate change.

In the past, he was the Director of the Russian Federal Service for Hydrometeorology and environmental monitoring – The Roshydromet (1993–2009). He was given the 2014 International Meteorological Organization Prize.

Since 25 January 2010 he is the special envoy of the President of Russia for climate affairs.

He has the federal state civilian service rank of 1st class Active State Councillor of the Russian Federation.

== Honours and awards ==
- Order For Merit to the Fatherland 4th class
- Order of Courage
- Medal "For Labour Valour"
- Medal "Veteran of Labour"
