= Ahmed Mohammed Ali Al-Madani =

Saudi arabian academic (born 1934)

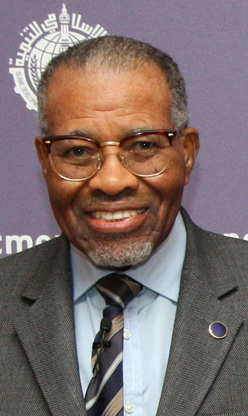
Ahmad Mohamed Ali Al-Madani at the 39th G8 summit in 2013.

Ahmed Mohamed Ali Al-Madani (Arabic: أحمد محمد على المدني; born 1934) is a Saudi Arabian academic and the former President of the Islamic Development Bank.

Ahmed Mohamed Ali Al-Madani was born in 1934 in Medina, Saudi Arabia. He earned a B.A. degree in commerce and a degree in law from Cairo University, M.A. in public administration from the University of Michigan in 1962, and PhD in public administration from the State University of New York at Albany in 1967.

From 1958–1959 Ahmed Mohamed Ali Al-Madani served as director of the Scientific and Islamic Institute in Aden, Yemen. During the period 1967–1972, he was appointed as the acting rector of the King Abdulaziz University in Saudi Arabia. From 1972–1975, he served as Deputy Minister of Education. In 1975, he was elected as the first president of the newly established Islamic Development Bank. In addition to the bank activities, 1993–1995 he was the Secretary-General of the Muslim World League.

He is married and has five children.

== Honour ==
=== Foreign honour ===
- Malaysia : Honorary Commander of the Order of the Defender of the Realm (P.M.N.) (2007)
- Kyrgyzstan : He was awarded the Danaker Order in (2007 № 332)
