= Jean Lemierre =

French economist (born 1950)

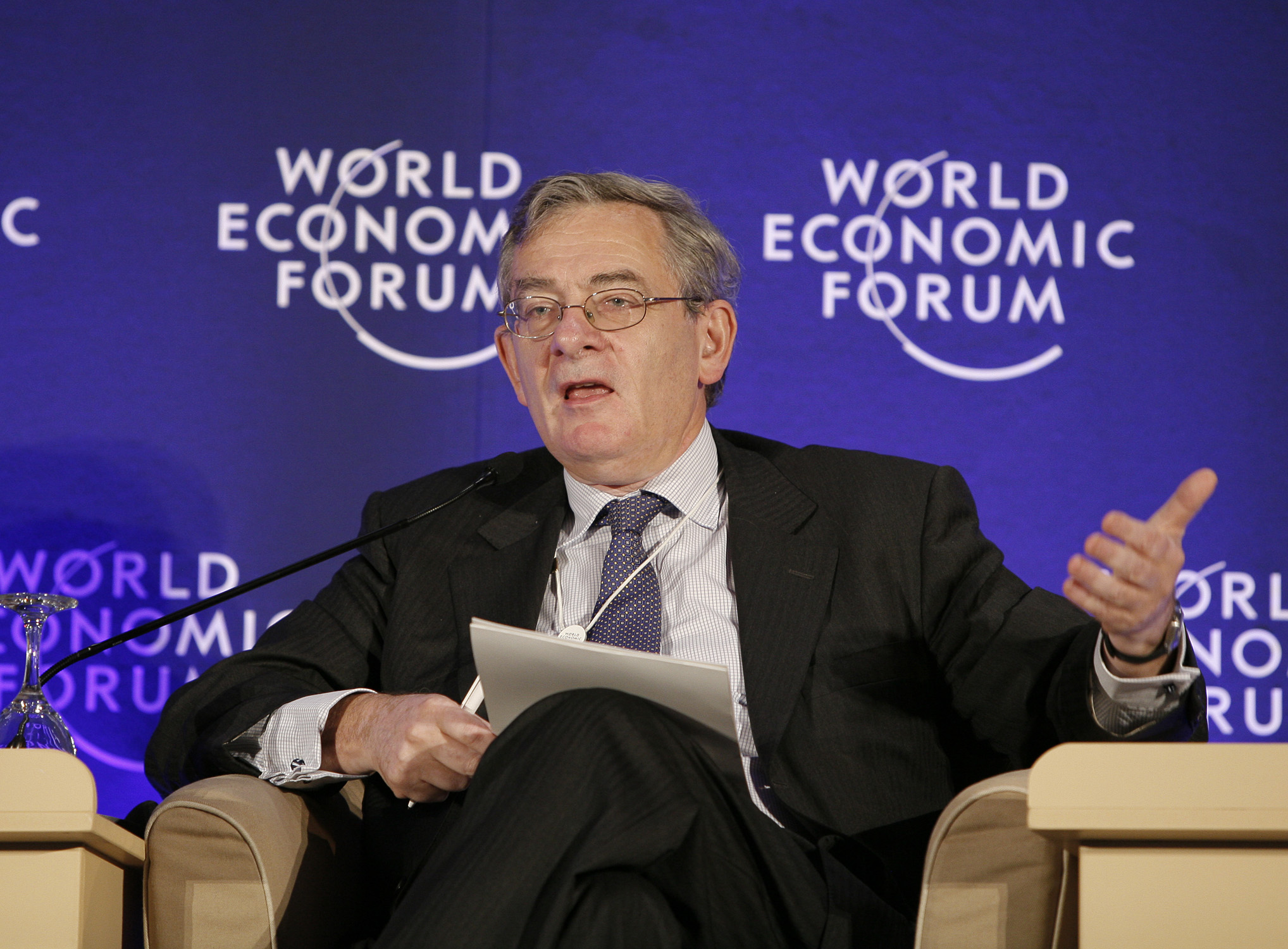

President of the European Bank for Reconstruction and Development
- In office July 2000 – July 2008
- Preceded by: Horst Köhler
- Succeeded by: Thomas Mirow

Personal details
- Born: 6 June 1950 (age 75) Sainte-Adresse, France
- Education: Sciences Po, ÉNA
- Occupation: Chairman of BNP Paribas

Jean Lemierre (born 6 June 1950) is a French former public servant who was the president of the European Bank for Reconstruction and Development from 2000 to 2008. He is now chairman of BNP Paribas.

== Career ==
=== Public sector ===
In 2000, Lemierre was elected as the new chief of the European Bank for Reconstruction and Development (EBRD), succeeding Horst Köhler. During his time in office, he warned Russia to stop Yukos-style expropriations from spreading.

In 2004, the French government nominated Lemierre as candidate to head the International Monetary Fund (IMF); the post went to Rodrigo Rato instead. From 2005 until 2008, he served on the advisory board of the Commission on Legal Empowerment of the Poor.

=== Private sector ===
Following his departure from EBRD, Lemierre joined BNP Paribas as an adviser.

In 2011, Lemierre (alongside Charles Dallara) was co-head of the bondholders' committee that renegotiated €200 billion of Greek bonds with the government in a high-stakes deal that staved off the country's collapse.

Lemierre was the bank's key negotiator in the record $8.9 billion fine it paid in 2014 for violating U.S. sanctions on Sudan, Libya and Cuba between 2002 and 2012. In 2014, he was appointed chairman of the board of directors.

== Other activities ==
=== Government agencies ===
- Monetary Authority of Singapore (MAS), Member of the International Advisory Panel

=== Corporate boards ===
- Türk Ekonomi Bankası (TBE), Member of the Board of Directors
- Total S.A., Independent Member of the Board of Directors
- China Investment Corporation (CIC), Member of the International Advisory Council
- China Development Bank (CDB), Member of the International Advisory Council

=== Non-profit organizations ===
- Institut de la Finance Durable (IFD), Member of the Board of Directors (since 2022)
- Atlantic Council, Member of the International Advisory Board
- Centre d'Etudes Prospectives et d'Informations Internationales (CEPII), Chairman
- European Financial Services Roundtable (EFR), Member
- French Association of Private Enterprises (AFEP), Member of the Board of Directors
- Institute of International Finance (IIF), Member of the Board
- Paris Europlace, Member of the Board of Directors
- Trilateral Commission, Member of the European Group
