= Les McDonald (triathlon) =

Canadian triathlete (1933–2017)

Les McDonald CM
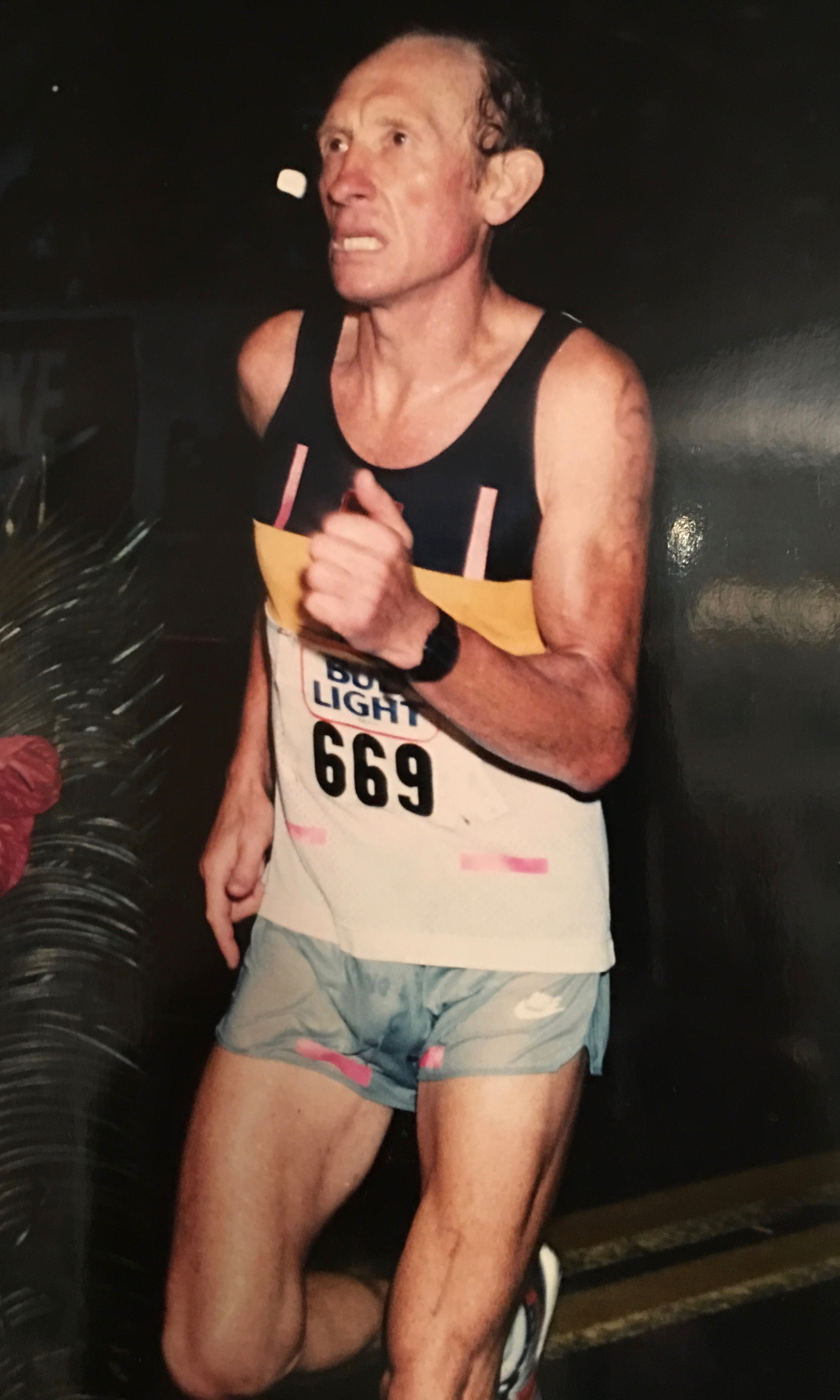
- Les McDonald in 1987
- Born: 30 April 1933; Newcastle upon Tyne, England, United Kingdom
- Died: 4 September 2017 (aged 84); North Vancouver, British Columbia, Canada
- Citizenship: British, Canadian
- Occupation: IF President
- Organization: International Triathlon Union
- Term: 1989 – 2008
- Successor: Marisol Casado
- Awards: Triathlon Canada Hall of Fame; BC Sports Hall of Fame; Canadian Olympic Hall of Fame; ITU Hall of Game; IOC Women and Sport Award
- Honours: Order of Canada; Olympic Order

Les McDonald, CM (30 April 1933 – 4 September 2017) was the founding President of the International Triathlon Union (ITU) from 1989-2008, and was made an Honorary President for the organization until his death in 2017. He is largely credited with getting the sport of triathlon into the Olympic Games, with the inaugural race taking place at the Games of the XXVII Olympiad in Sydney, Australia, in 2000. He is a member of the Triathlon Canada Hall of Fame (2001), Canadian Olympic Hall of Fame (2007), the BC Sports Hall of Fame (2009), and the ITU Hall of Fame (2014). He was awarded the Olympic Order in 2010, in Vancouver, by the International Olympic Committee. He was inducted as a Member of the Order of Canada in 2013 by His Excellency the Right Honourable David Johnston, the Governor General of Canada.

== Personal life ==
Les McDonald was born to a coal miner and a newspaper shopkeeper and grew up in Felling, a borough near Newcastle upon Tyne (where he was born), in the northeast of England, in 1933. He was the eldest of 3 children. He left school at the age of 14 to work in the coal mines and help support his family. He completed two years of military service and was part of the British army of occupation of Germany in the post-war period, which would eventually lead to him meeting his wife, Monique. In 1955, he immigrated to Vancouver, BC, where he married and had 3 children. As a young man in the northeast of England, he had discovered rock climbing and skiing. He became a legendary rock climber and would go on to achieve many first ascents in Canada, some with the legendary Fred Beckey. He then continued his passion for skiing, coaching at Grouse Mountain and Whistler Mountain. He helped form the Alta Lake Sports Club based out of Whistler, BC, Canada, and competed in several cross country ski marathons including the Engadin Skimarathon. During his early professional life, he worked as an electrician and labor union organizer with the International Brotherhood of Electrical Workers. His prowess in sports administration and organization were heavily influenced by his experiences as a labour unionist.

== Triathlon ==
Les discovered Triathlon in the 1980s while cross-training for marathons. In 1981, he organized one of the first triathlons in Canada, which took place in Vancouver. He founded the British Columbia Triathlon Federation in 1983, followed by Triathlon Canada in 1984. He was President of Triathlon Canada from 1984-1996, and a member of the Canadian Olympic Committee Board of Directors. He was a five-time Ironman Age Group World Champion in the 50-55 age class from 1983 to 1987, setting consecutive age group record times in the process. He spent much of his own time and money traveling around the world setting up national triathlon governing bodies ahead of the 1989 World Championship and the inaugural International Triathlon Union (ITU) Congress in Avignon, France where he was elected President of the ITU. He is largely credited with getting the sport of triathlon into the Olympic Games through years of tireless effort and dedication to the sport. He was a driving force in the sport of triathlon, and pushed feminist values including equal prize money, representation, and concurrent medal ceremonies for male and female athletes. He remained president of the ITU until 2008, retiring at the age of 75. He was appointed as Honorary President of the ITU and remained in that position until his death.

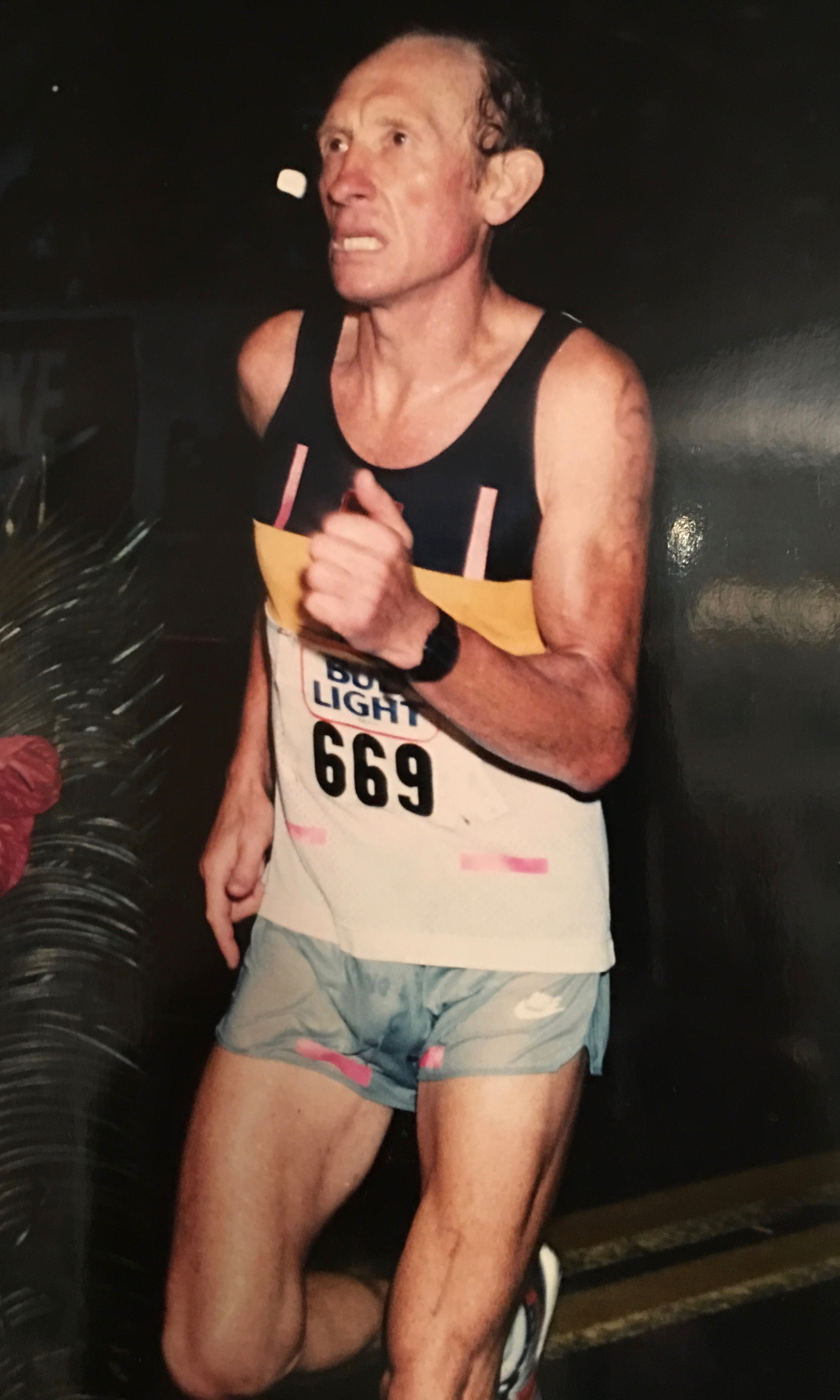
Les McDonald - 1987 Hawaii Ironman World Championships

== Awards and honours ==
- 2001 - Triathlon Canada Hall of Fame - Builder
- 2007 - Canadian Olympic Hall of Fame - Builder
- 2009 - BC Sports Hall of Fame - Builder
- 2010 - Olympic Order (Silver)
- 2010 - IOC Women and Sport Award
- 2013 - Member of the Order of Canada (CM)
- 2014 - ITU Hall of Fame - Lifetime Achievement Award

== Notable achievements ==
=== Mountain climbing ===
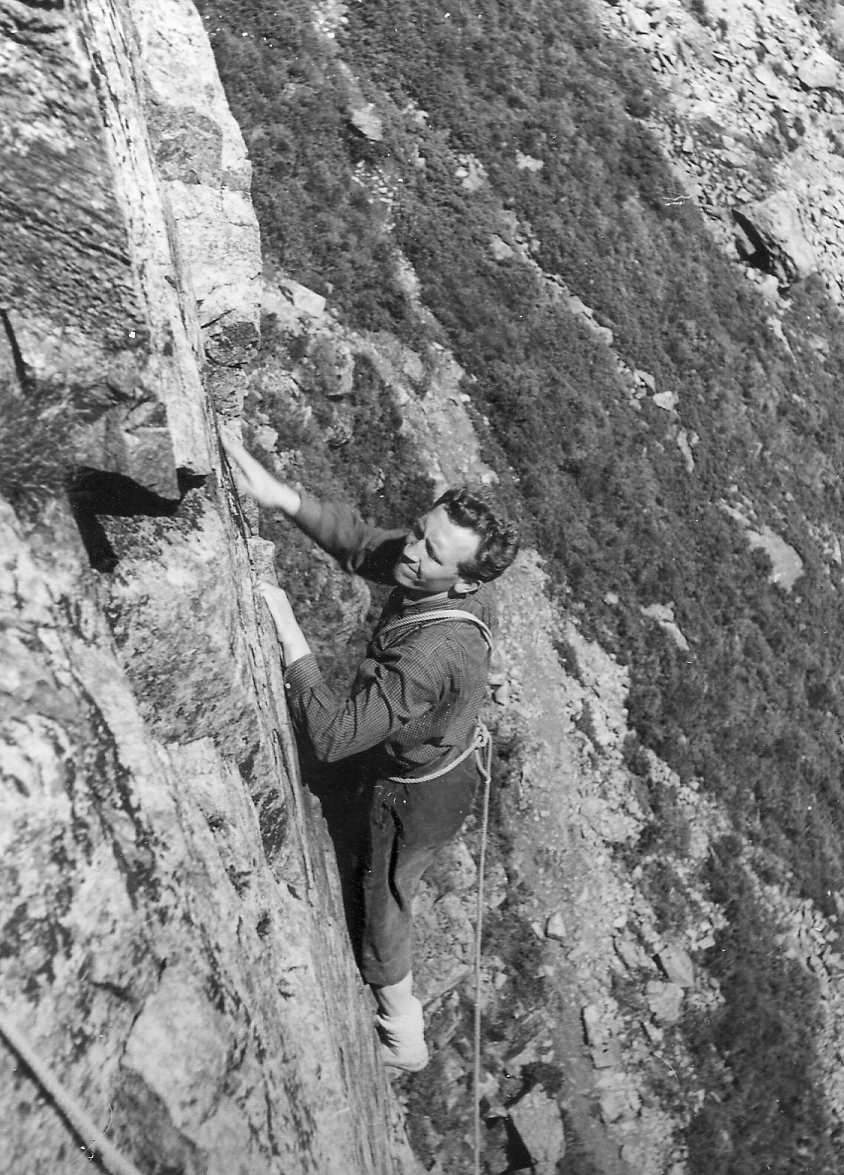
Les McDonald - Climbing

==== First ascents ====
- 1956 - Summit Pyramid Routes - Northwest Face "Labour Day Route" - Mount Shuksan - Washington, USA.
- 1956 - Summit Pyramid Routes - Eastern route - Mount Shuksan - Washington, USA.
- 1958 - Coleman Headwall - Mount Baker - Washington, USA.
- 1959 - Peasant's Route - Squamish Chief - Squamish, British Columbia, Canada.
- 1959 - South West Face - Sharkfin Tower - Mount Buckner - Washington, USA.
- 1960 - Center/West Route - Lake Ann Buttress - Mount Buckner - Washington, USA.
- 1960 - The Diritissimo - Mount Shuksan - Washington, USA.
- 1962 - Angel's Crest Route - Squamish Chief - Squamish, British Columbia, Canada with Fred Beckey, Eric Bjornstad, and Hank Mather.
- 1964 - YellowSlab Variation - Center/West Route - Mount Shuksan - Washington, USA.
- 1965 - Lieback Crack route - The Sugarloaf, North Side - Murrin Park, Squamish, British Columbia, Canada.
- 1966 - Eastern Route - Mount Shuksan - Washington, USA.
- 1967 - The Good Neighbour Peak - Centennial Climb - Mount Vancouver - Alaska, USA.
- 1967 - Central Peak - Mount Vancouver - Alaska, USA.

=== Triathlon ===
- 1983 - Ironman Hawaii 50-55 Age Group World Championships - 1st Place
- 1984 - Ironman Hawaii 50-55 Age Group World Championships - 1st Place
- 1985 - Ironman Hawaii 50-55 Age Group World Championships - 1st Place
- 1986 - Ironman Hawaii 50-55 Age Group World Championships - 1st Place
- 1987 - Ironman Hawaii 50-55 Age Group World Championships - 1st Place - Age Group Record Time: 10:55:32 (no longer standing)
