= Brunson McKinley =

American diplomat

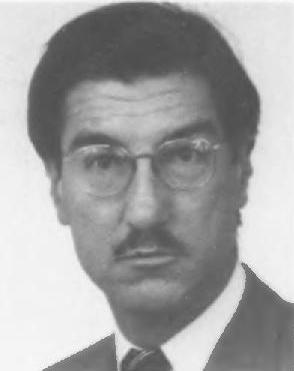
- A photograph of McKinley published in State Magazine in 1986

8th Director General of the International Organization for Migration
- In office October 1, 1998 – September 30, 2008
- Preceded by: James N. Purcell Jr.
- Succeeded by: William L. Swing

Personal details
- Born: Brunson McKinley; 1943 (age 82–83)

Brunson McKinley (born 1943) is a Co-Chair of the Association for International Mobility (AIM) and was the Director General of the International Organization for Migration (elected to back to back terms in October 1998 and 2003).

He was the first American ambassador to Haiti in the post-Duvalier period (1986 until 1989).

McKinley received his A.B. from the University of Chicago in 1962 and M.A. from Harvard University in 1964, both in classical languages, and served as an Army officer for five years.
