= Rubén Acosta (volleyball) =

Mexican sports administrator

President of the Fédération Internationale de Volleyball
- In office 1984–2008
- Preceded by: Paul Libaud
- Succeeded by: Wei Jizhong

Personal details
- Born: Rubén Acosta Hernández; 4 April 1934 (age 90); Jerez de García Salinas, Mexico

Rubén Acosta Hernández (born 4 April 1934) is a Mexican sports administrator who was the president of the Fédération Internationale de Volleyball (FIVB) from 1984 to 2008. In 1988, he was a recipient of the Silver Olympic Order.

Sporting positions
Preceded by Paul Libaud	President of the Fédération Internationale de Volleyball; 1984–2008	Succeeded by Wei Jizhong
