= Mustapha Larfaoui =

Algerian swimmer (born 1932)

Mustapha Larfaoui (born 27 November 1932 in Algiers) is a former member of the International Olympic Committee (IOC) from Algeria. From 1988 – March 24, 2009 he served as President of FINA, the international federation that oversees Aquatics. He was the first African to hold the FINA presidency. He is now Honorary Life President of FINA.

Larfaoui is a member of the World Anti-Doping Agency's executive committee and part of the IOC's Olympic Games study and marketing commission. He is a member of the IOC's evaluation commission for the 2012 Olympic Games. He has been president of the African Swimming Confederation for more than 30 years.

A former hospital and public health director, he holds degrees in Arabic and French.
