= Juan Manuel Suárez Del Toro Rivero =

Juan Manuel Suárez Del Toro Rivero, from Spain, is the current president of the Spanish Red Cross and is a former president of the International Federation of Red Cross and Red Crescent Societies.

Non-profit organization positions
Preceded by Astrid Nøklebye Heiberg	President of the International Federation of Red Cross and Red Crescent Societies; 2000–2009	Succeeded by Tadateru Konoé
