= Bruno Grandi =

Italian sportsman (1934–2019)

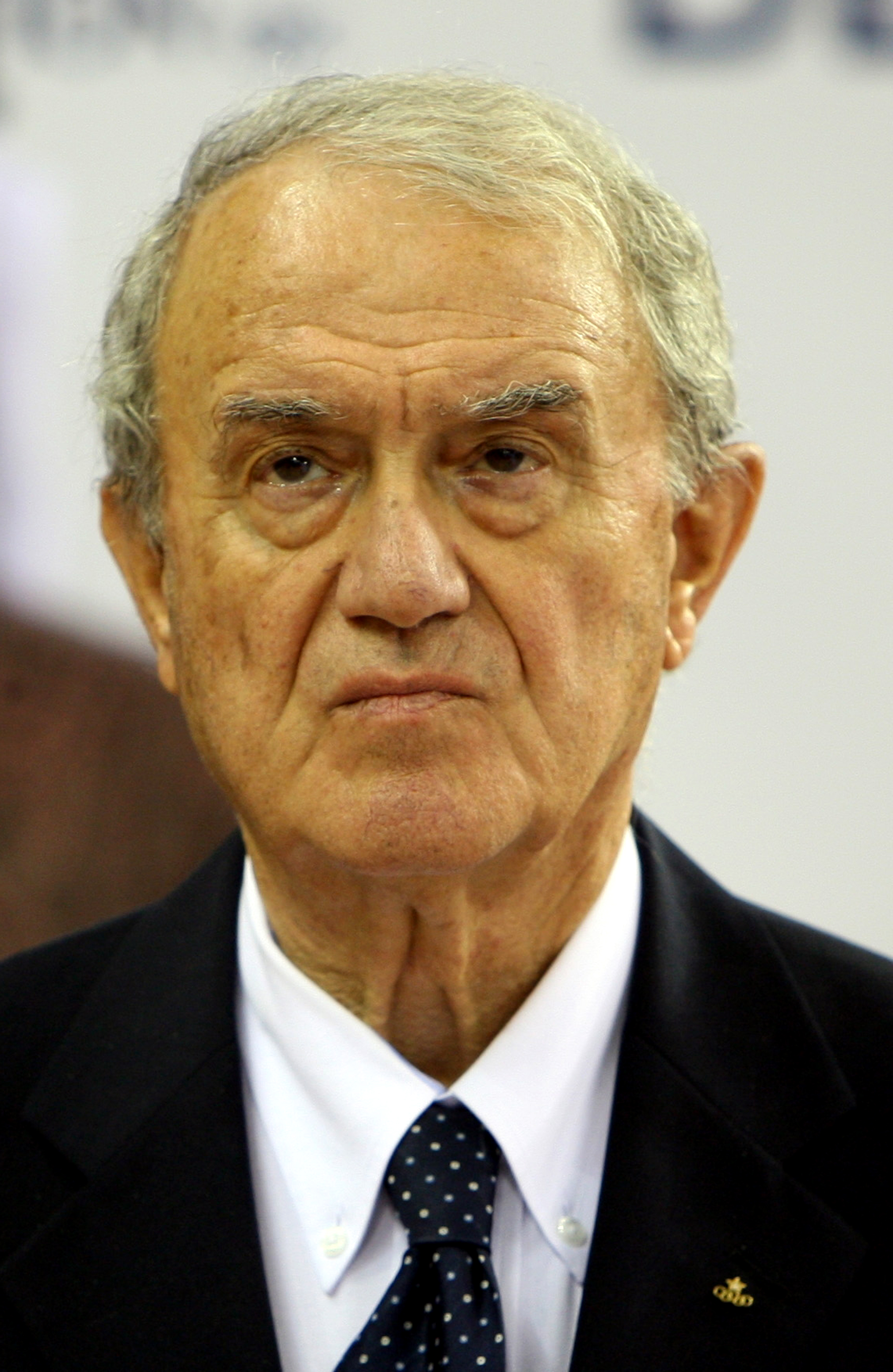
- Grandi attends the gymnastics events of the Doha Arab Games

Personal information
- Born: 9 May 1934 Forlì, Kingdom of Italy
- Died: 13 September 2019 (aged 85) Forlimpopoli, Italy

Gymnastics career
- Discipline: Men's artistic gymnastics

Bruno Grandi (9 May 1934 – 13 September 2019) was an Italian sportsman who served as president of the FIG (Federation Internationale de Gymnastique) from 1996 to 2016 and was a member of the International Olympic Committee from 2000 to 2004.

== Biography ==
A native of Forlì, Emilia Romagna, Grandi served as Professor of Physical Education at the High Institute of Physical Education in Rome. He was a member of the Italian Artistic Gymnastic Juniors team, national coach of the Italian Men's junior team and the long-time President of the Italian Gymnastics Federation (1977-2000).

During Grandi's tenure, the sport has gone through many controversies, notably those at the 2004 Olympics. The men's high bar fiasco surrounding Alexei Nemov and the Paul Hamm / Yang Tae Young dispute garnered the most publicity. In 2004–2005, the FIG and its president, Grandi, developed a new scoring system, in which an open-ended scoring system will be used, so that the marks are theoretically limitless, therefore eliminating the notion of Perfect 10. The majority of the FIG voted in favour of the new Code. The new code took effect in 2006.

In 2001 Grandi was inducted into the International Gymnastics Hall of Fame.

He died in Italy after an illness at age 85.

Sporting positions
Preceded by Yuri Titov	President of the International Gymnastics Federation; 1997–2016	Succeeded by Morinari Watanabe
