= Francesco Frangialli =

Italian UN official

Francesco Frangialli served as Secretary-General of the United Nations World Tourism Organization, from 1997 to 2009.

He is an honorary professor at the School of Hotel and Tourism Management at Hong Kong Polytechnic University.

== Publications ==
- Frangialli, Francesco; Reignier, Elisabeth; Laville, Corinne (1988). Les échanges touristiques des pays de l'OCDE; L'emploi dans le tourisme; La destination France chez les tours opérateurs français; Le tourisme dans l'économie espagnole. Collection de l'économie du tourisme. Vol. 7. Direction de l'industrie touristique, France. France: Documentation française. ISBN 2110019492.
- Frangialli, Francesco, ed. (1988). Evolution de la clientèle de l'hôtellerie homologuée; Fréquentation de l'hôtellerie homologuée en 1987 (France entière); L'offre d'hébergement au 31/12/86 et 31/12/87 : hôtellerie homologuée, terrains de camping classés. Paris, France: Documentation française. ISBN 2110020792. LCCN 90102525.
- Frangialli, Francesco (1991). La France dans le tourisme mondial. France: Economica. ISBN 2717821104. LCCN 92116652.
- Frangialli, Francesco (1999). Considérations sur le tourisme international : discours et documents [Observations on international tourism : addresses and documents (in English); Consideraciones sobre el turismo internacional: discursos y documentos]. Vol. 1. Spain: World Tourism Organization. ISBN 9284402913.
- Frangialli, Francesco (1999). ibid. Vol. 2. World Tourism Organization. ISBN 928440441X.
- Frangialli, Francesco (2004). International tourism : the great turning point. Spain: World Tourism Organization. ISBN 928440682X.
- Frangialli, Francesco (2009). Le nouvel état touristique : dix-huit leçons sur la société du loisir et du voyage. Spain: Organisation mondiale du tourisme. ISBN 9789284413126.

Government offices
Preceded by Antonio Enríquez Savignac	Secretary-General of the UNWTO; 1997–2009	Succeeded by Taleb Rifai
