= List of international organization leaders in 2007 =

The following is a list of international organization leaders in 2007.

== UN organizations ==
| Organization | Title | Leader | Country | In office | Ref |
|---|---|---|---|---|---|
| Food and Agriculture Organization | Director-general | Jacques Diouf | Senegal | 1994-2011 | |
| International Atomic Energy Agency | Director-general | Mohamed ElBaradei | Egypt | 1997-2009 | |
| International Civil Aviation Organization | President of the Council | Roberto Kobeh González | Mexico | 2006-2013 | |
| International Civil Aviation Organization | Secretary-general | Taïeb Chérif | Algeria | 2003-2009 | |
| International Labour Organization | Director-general | Juan Somavía | Chile | 1999–2012 | |
| United Nations | Secretary-general | Ban Ki-moon | South Korea | 2007–2016 | |
| United Nations | President of the General Assembly | Haya Rashed Al-Khalifa | Bahrain | 2006-2007 | |
| United Nations | President of the General Assembly | Srgjan Kerim | North Macedonia | 2007-2008 | |
| United Nations | United Nations Security Council members | | China, France, Russia, United Kingdom, United States (permanent members); Congo, Ghana, Peru, Qatar, Slovakia (elected for 2006–2007); Belgium, Indonesia, Italy, Panama, South Africa (elected for 2007–2008)) | | |
| United Nations | United Nations Children's Fund (UNICEF) Executive Director | Ann Veneman | United States | 2005–2010 | |
| United Nations | United Nations Educational, Scientific and Cultural Organization (UNESCO) director-general | Kōichirō Matsuura | Japan | 1999-2009 | |
| United Nations | United Nations High Commissioner for Human Rights | Louise Arbour | Canada | 2004-2008 | |
| United Nations | United Nations High Commissioner for Refugees (UNHCR) | António Guterres | Portugal | 2005–2015 | |
| United Nations | United Nations Industrial Development Organization (UNIDO) director-general | Kandeh Yumkella | Sierra Leone | 2005–2013 | |
| United Nations | World Food Programme (WFP) Executive Director | Josette Sheeran | United States | 2006–2012 | |
| United Nations | World Health Organization (WHO) director-general | Margaret Chan | China | 2006–2017 | |
| World Meteorological Organization (WMO) | President | Alexander Bedritsky | Russia | 2003–2011 | |
| World Meteorological Organization (WMO) | Secretary-general | Michel Jarraud | France | 2004–2015 | |
| World Tourism Organization (UNWTO) | Secretary-general | Francesco Frangialli | Jordan | 1997-2009 | |

== Political and economic organizations ==
| Organization | Title | Leader | Country | In office | Ref |
|---|---|---|---|---|---|
| African, Caribbean and Pacific Group of States (ACP) | Secretary-general | John Kaputin | Papua New Guinea | 2005–2010 | |
| African Union | Chairperson | Denis Sassou Nguesso | Republic of the Congo | 2006-2007 | |
| African Union | Chairperson | John Kufuor | Ghana | 2007-2008 | |
| African Union | Chairperson of the Commission | Alpha Oumar Konaré | Mali | 2003-2008 (first Chairperson) | |
| African Union | President of the Pan-African Parliament | Gertrude Mongella | Tanzania | 2004-2008 (first President) | |
| Andean Community | Secretary-general | Alfredo Fuentes Hernández | Colombia | 2006-2007 (interim) | |
| Andean Community | Secretary-general | Freddy Ehlers | Ecuador | 2007–2010 | |
| Arab League | Secretary-general | Amr Moussa | Egypt | 2001–2011 | |
| Arab Maghreb Union | Secretary-general | Habib Ben Yahia | Tunisia | 2006–2016 | |
| Asia-Pacific Economic Cooperation (APEC) | Executive director | Colin Heseltine | Australia | 2007 | |
| Association of Southeast Asian Nations (ASEAN) | Secretary-general | Ong Keng Yong | Singapore | 2003-2007 | |
| Caribbean Community | Secretary-general | Edwin Carrington | Trinidad and Tobago | 1992–2010 | |
| Central American Parliament (PARLACEN) | President | Ciro Cruz Zepeda | El Salvador | 2006-2007 | |
| Central American Parliament (PARLACEN) | President | Julio Guillermo González Gamarra | Guatemala | 2007-2008 | |
| Common Market of East and Southern Africa (COMESA) | Secretary-general | Erastus J. O. Mwencha | Kenya | 1998-2008 | |
| Commonwealth of Nations | Head | Queen Elizabeth II | United Kingdom | 1952–present | |
| Commonwealth of Nations | Secretary-general | Don McKinnon | New Zealand | 2000-2008 | |
| Commonwealth of Independent States | Executive secretary | Vladimir Rushailo | Russia | 2004-2007 | |
| Commonwealth of Independent States | Executive secretary | Sergey Lebedev | Russia | 2007–present | |
| Council of Europe | Secretary General | Terry Davis | United Kingdom | 2004-2009 | |
| Council of Europe | President of the Parliamentary Assembly of the Council of Europe (PACE) | René van der Linden | Netherlands | 2005-2008 | |
| Council of Europe | President of the European Court of Human Rights (first President) | Luzius Wildhaber | Switzerland | 1998-2007 | |
| Council of Europe | President of the European Court of Human Rights (first President) | Jean-Paul Costa | France | 2007-2011 | |
| East African Community | Secretary-general | Juma Volter Mwapachu | Tanzania | 2006–2011 | |
| Economic Community of West African States (ECOWAS) | President of the Commission | Mohamed Ibn Chambas | Ghana | 2007–2010 (first President) | |
| Economic Community of West African States (ECOWAS) | Executive secretary | Mohamed Ibn Chambas | Ghana | 2002-2006 (final executive secretary) | |
| Economic Community of West African States (ECOWAS) | Chairman | Mamadou Tandja | Niger | 2005-2007 | |
| Economic Community of West African States (ECOWAS) | Chairman | Blaise Compaoré | Burkina Faso | 2007-2008 | |
| Eurasian Economic Community | Secretary-general | Grigory Rapota | Russia | 2001-2007 | |
| Eurasian Economic Community | Secretary-general | Tair Mansurov | Kazakhstan | 2007–2014 | |
| Eurasian Economic Community | Chairman of the Interstate Council | Nursultan Nazarbayev | Kazakhstan | 2001-2014 | |
| European Free Trade Association | Secretary-general | Kåre Bryn | Norway | 2006–2012 | |
| European Union (EU) | Presidency of the European Council | Janez Janša | Slovenia | 2007 | |
| European Union (EU) | Presidency of the Council of the European Union | | Germany | 2007 | |
| European Union (EU) | Presidency of the Council of the European Union | | Portugal | 2007 | |
| European Union (EU) | President of the European Commission | José Manuel Barroso | Portugal | 2004–2014 | |
| European Union (EU) | President of the European Parliament | Josep Borrell | Spain/Argentina | 2004-2007 | |
| European Union (EU) | President of the European Parliament | Hans-Gert Pöttering | Germany | 2007-2009 | |
| European Union (EU) | Secretary-General of the Council | Javier Solana | Spain | 1999-2009 | |
| European Union (EU) | High Representative for the Common Foreign and Security Policy | Javier Solana | Spain | 1999-2009 | |
| European Union (EU) | President of the European Central Bank | Jean-Claude Trichet | France | 2003–2011 | |
| European Union (EU) | European Ombudsman | Nikiforos Diamandouros | Greece | 2003–2013 | |
| European Union (EU) | President of the Committee of the Regions (CoR) | Michel Delebarre | France | 2006-2008 | |
| European Union (EU) | President of the European Investment Bank (EIB) | Philippe Maystadt | Belgium | 2000–2011 | |
| European Union (EU) | President of the European Court of Justice (ECJ) | Vassilios Skouris | Greece | 2003–2015 | |
| European Union (EU) | President of the European Court of Auditors (ECA) | Hubert Weber | Austria | 2005-2008 | |
| European Union (EU) | President of the Economic and Social Committee (EESC) | Dimitris Dimitriadis | Greece | 2006-2008 | |
| Gulf Cooperation Council | Secretary-general | Abdul Rahman bin Hamad Al Attiyah | Qatar | 2002–2011 | |
| Ibero-American General Secretariat (SEGIB) | Secretary-general | Enrique V. Iglesias | Uruguay | 2005–2013 | |
| Indian Ocean Commission | Secretary-general | Monique Andréas Esoavelomandroso | Madagascar | 2004-2008 | |
| Non-Aligned Movement (NAM) | Chairman | Fidel Castro | Cuba | 2006-2008 | |
| Non-Aligned Movement (NAM) | Chairman | Raúl Castro | Cuba | 2006-2009 | |
| Nordic Council | President | Dagfinn Høybråten | Norway | 2007 | |
| Nordic Council | Secretary-general | Frida Nokken | Norway | 1999-2007 | |
| Nordic Council | Secretary-general | Jan-Erik Enestam | Finland | 2007–2013 | |
| North Atlantic Treaty Organization (NATO) | Secretary-general | Jaap de Hoop Scheffer | Denmark | 2004-2009 | |
| Organisation for Economic Co-operation and Development (OECD) | Secretary-general | José Ángel Gurría | Mexico | 2006–2021 | |
| Organization for Security and Co-operation in Europe (OSCE) | Secretary-general | Marc Perrin de Brichambaut | France | 2005–2011 | |
| Organization for Security and Co-operation in Europe (OSCE) | Chairman-in-Office | Miguel Ángel Moratinos | Spain | 2007 | |
| Organization for Security and Co-operation in Europe (OSCE) | High Commissioner on National Minorities | Rolf Ekéus | Sweden | 2001-2007 | |
| Organization for Security and Co-operation in Europe (OSCE) | High Commissioner on National Minorities | Knut Vollebæk | Norway | 2007–2013 | |
| Organization of American States | Secretary-general | José Miguel Insulza | Chile | 2005-2015 | |
| Organisation of Eastern Caribbean States | Director-general | Len Ishmael | Saint Lucia | 2003–2013 | |
| Organisation of the Islamic Conference (OIC) | Secretary-general | Ekmeleddin Ihsanoglu | Turkey | 2005–2013 | |
| Pacific Community (SPC) | Director-general | Jimmie Rodgers | Solomon Islands | 2006–2014 | |
| Pacific Islands Forum | Secretary-general | Greg Urwin | Australia | 2004-2008 | |
| Shanghai Cooperation Organisation (SCO) | Secretary-general | Bolat Nurgaliyev | Kazakhstan | 2007-2009 (first Secretary-General) | |
| South Asian Association for Regional Cooperation (SAARC) | Secretary-general | Chenkyab Dorji | Bhutan | 2005-2008 | |
| Southern Cone Common Market (Mercosur) | Director of the executive secretariat | | | ?-2008 | |
| Southern African Development Community | Executive secretary | Tomaz Salomão | Mozambique | 2005–2013 | |
| Unrepresented Nations and Peoples Organization (UNPO) | Secretary-general | Marino Busdachin | Italy | 2003-2018 | |
| Western European Union | Secretary-general | Javier Solana | Spain | 1999-2009 | |
| World Trade Organization (WTO) | Director-general | Pascal Lamy | France | 2005–2013 | |

== Financial organizations ==
| Organization | Title | Leader | Country | In office | Ref |
|---|---|---|---|---|---|
| African Development Bank | President | Donald Kaberuka | Rwanda | 2005–2015 | |
| Asian Development Bank | President | Haruhiko Kuroda | Japan | 2005–2013 | |
| European Bank for Reconstruction and Development | President | Jean Lemierre | France | 2000-2008 | |
| Inter-American Development Bank (IADB) | President | Luis Alberto Moreno | Colombia | 2005–2020 | |
| International Monetary Fund | Managing director | Rodrigo Rato | Spain | 2004-2007 | |
| International Monetary Fund | Managing director | Dominique Strauss-Kahn | France | 2007–2011 | |
| Islamic Development Bank (IDB) | President | Ahmed Mohammed Ali Al-Madani | Saudi Arabia | 1975–present | |
| World Bank | President | Paul Wolfowitz | United States | 2005-2007 | |
| World Bank | President | Robert Zoellick | United States | 2007–2012 | |

== Sports organizations ==
| Organization | President | Country | In office | Ref |
|---|---|---|---|---|
| Asian Football Confederation (AFC) | Mohamed bin Hammam | Qatar | 2002–2011 | |
| Badminton World Federation (BWF) | Kang Young-joong | South Korea | 2005-2013 | |
| Confédération africaine de football (CAF) | Issa Hayatou | Cameroon | 1988-2017 | |
| Confederation of North, Central American and Caribbean Association Football (CONCACAF) | Jack A. Warner | Trinidad and Tobago | 1990–2011 | |
| Confederación Sudamericana de Fútbol (CONMEBOL) | Nicolás Leoz | Paraguay | 1986–2013 | |
| Fédération internationale de basket-ball | Robert Elphinston | Australia | 2006-2010 | |
| Fédération Internationale de Football Association (FIFA) | Sepp Blatter | Switzerland | 1998–2015 | |
| Fédération Internationale de Gymnastique (FIG) | Bruno Grandi | Italy | 1996-2016 | |
| Fédération internationale de natation (FINA) | Mustapha Larfaoui | Algeria | 1988-2009 | |
| Fédération Internationale de Volleyball (FIVB) | Rubén Acosta | Mexico | 1984-2008 | |
| Fédération Internationale des Sociétés d'Aviron (FISA) | Denis Oswald | Switzerland | 1989-2014 | |
| Fédération Équestre Internationale (FEI) | Princess Haya bint Hussein | Jordan | 2006-2014 | |
| Fédération Internationale d'Escrime (FIE) | René Roch | France | 1993-2008 | |
| International Blind Sports Federation (IBSA) | Michael Barredo | Philippines | 2005-2013 | |
| International Association of Athletics Federations | Lamine Diack | Senegal | 1999-2015 | |
| International Boxing Association (IBA) | Wu Ching-kuo | Taiwan | 2006-2017 | |
| International Cricket Council (ICC) | Percy Sonn | South Africa | 2006-2007 | |
| International Cricket Council (ICC) | Ray Mali | South Africa | 2007-2008 | |
| International Handball Federation (IHF) | Hassan Moustafa | Egypt | 2000–present | |
| International Hockey Federation (FIIH) | René Fasel | Switzerland | 1994-2021 | |
| International Judo Federation (IJF) | Park Yong-sung | South Korea | 1995-2007 | |
| International Judo Federation (IJF) | Marius Vizer | Romania/Austria | 2007–present | |
| International Olympic Committee (IOC) | Jacques Rogge | Belgium | 2001–2013 | |
| International Paralympic Committee (IPC) | Philip Craven | United Kingdom | 2001–2017 | |
| International Rugby Board (IRB) | Syd Millar | Northern Ireland | 2003-2007 | |
| International Sailing Federation (ISAF) | Göran Petersson | Sweden | 2004-2012 | |
| International Shooting Sport Federation (ISSF) | Olegario Vázquez Raña | Mexico | 1980-2018 | |
| International Table Tennis Federation (ITTF) | Adham Sharara | Canada | 1999-2014 | |
| International Tennis Federation (ITF) | Francesco Ricci Bitti | Italy | 1999-2015 | |
| World Taekwondo Federation (WTF) | Chungwon Choue | South Korea | 2004–present | |
| International Triathlon Union (ITU) | Les McDonald | United Kingdom/Canada | 1989-2008 | |

== Other organizations ==
| Organization | Title | Leader | Country | In office | Ref |
|---|---|---|---|---|---|
| Antarctic Treaty | Executive secretary | Jan Huber | Netherlands | 2004-2009 (first executive secretary) | |
| Colombo Plan | Secretary-general | Kittipan Kanjanapipatkul | Thailand | 2003-2007 | |
| Colombo Plan | Secretary-general | Patricia Yoon-Moi Chia | Malaysia | 2007–2011 | |
| Community of Portuguese Language Countries (CPLP) | Executive secretary | Luís de Matos Monteiro da Fonseca | Cape Verde | 2004-2008 | |
| La Francophonie | Secretary-general | Abdou Diouf | Senegal | 2003–2014 | |
| Intergovernmental Authority on Development (IGAD) | Executive secretary | Attalla Bashir | Sudan | 2000-2008 | |
| International Committee of the Red Cross | President | Jakob Kellenberger | Switzerland | 2000–2012 | |
| International Court of Justice | Presidents | Rosalyn Higgins | United Kingdom | 2006-2009 | |
| International Criminal Court | President | Philippe Kirsch | Canada | 2003-2009 (first President) | |
| International Criminal Police Organization (Interpol) | Secretary-general | Ronald Noble | United States | 2000-2014 | |
| International Criminal Police Organization (Interpol) | President | Jackie Selebi | South Africa | 2004-2008 | |
| International Federation of Red Cross and Red Crescent Societies (IFRC) | President | Juan Manuel Suárez Del Toro Rivero | Spain | 2001-2009 | |
| International Maritime Organization | Secretary-general | Efthimios E. Mitropoulos | Greece | 2004–2011 | |
| International Organization for Migration (IOM) | Director-general | Brunson McKinley | United States | 1998-2008 | |
| International Telecommunication Union | Secretary-general | Hamadoun Touré | Mali | 2007–2014 | |
| Organisation for the Prohibition of Chemical Weapons (OPCW) | Director-general | Rogelio Pfirter | Argentina | 2002–2010 | |
| Organization of the Petroleum Exporting Countries (OPEC) | Secretary-general | Abdallah Salem el-Badri | Libya | 2007–2016 | |
| Universal Postal Union | Director-general | Édouard Dayan | France | 2005–2013 | |
| World Intellectual Property Organization (WIPO) | Director-general | Kamil Idris | Sudan | 1997-2008 | |

== See also ==
- List of state leaders in 2007
- List of religious leaders in 2007
- List of colonial governors in 2007
- List of international organization leaders in 2006
- List of international organization leaders in 2008
