= Emilsen Manyoma =

Colombian human rights activist

Emilsen Manyoma (1984 or 1985 - 2017) was a human rights activist from Colombia. Manyoma was of Afro-Colombian descent. She worked for the "Communities Building Peace in Territories" or CONPAZ network in the Bajo Calima region of the country in Valle del Cauca. Manyoma had been an outspoken critic of right-wing paramilitaries and mining and agricultural corporations. Manyoma's work involved the rights of people displaced by drug trafficking. She had also been working for the Colombian Truth Commission, documenting murder and disappearances. She was assassinated in January 2017, along with Joe Javier Rodallega, her partner. Emilsen also worked with Humanitarian Space Puente Nayero which began in April 2014 trying to create a space free from armed groups.

== Assassination ==
Rodallega's mother told El País that Manyoma and Rodallega had been at home in their pajamas watching a movie with their son on the night of 14 January 2017 when they boarded a taxi, never to be seen again. Their bodies were found three days later in a rural zone of Buenaventura, the city where they lived, in a state of decomposition with stab wounds and gunshot wounds. Both of their throats had been slit, and Rodallega's hands were bound. In the days following her assassination, the FARC issued a statement blaming Manyoma's brother Marco Antonio Manyoma Ocampo, alias Camilo Robledo, for her murder. According to the statement, Robledo had deserted from the FARC with money and weapons and returned to Buenaventura where he killed his sister and her partner. In February 2017, Colombian authorities arrested taxi driver Julio César Valencia Moreno for supposedly participating in the murder, and they arrested Manyoma's brother Marco Antonio Manyoma Ocampo a week later. On 13 February, 2017, a man whose name was not revealed was also arrested and sent to prison for the same case.

Her work against the interests of businesses and paramilitaries were described as the reasons for the murder: Her murder was part of a series of killings of political activists in the country that occurred during the presidency of Juan Manuel Santos: at least 534 activists were killed between 2011 and 2016.
