= Francisco José Lloreda Mera =

Colombian lawyer, politician and writer (born 1965)

High Presidential Advisor for Coexistence and Citizen Security
- Incumbent
- Assumed office 19 January 2011
- President: Juan Manuel Santos Calderón

Colombia Ambassador to the Netherlands
- In office 2 July 2008 – 7 December 2010
- President: Álvaro Uribe Vélez
- Preceded by: Guillermo Fernández de Soto Valderrama
- Succeeded by: Eduardo Pizarro Leongómez

77th Minister of National Education of Colombia
- In office 18 July 2000 – 7 August 2002
- President: Andrés Pastrana Arango
- Preceded by: Germán Bula Escobar
- Succeeded by: Cecilia María Vélez White

Personal details
- Born: 13 November 1965 (age 60) Santiago de Cali, Valle del Cauca, Colombia
- Spouse(s): María Cecilia Cabal Castro (2000-present)
- Relations: Rodrigo Hernán Lloreda Caicedo (father)
- Children: Camilo Lloreda Cabal; Andrea Lloreda Cabal
- Education: Pontifical Xavierian University (LLB, 1990); Columbia University (MPA, 1994); University of Oxford (MSc, 2003; PhD, 2010)
- Profession: Lawyer

Francisco José Lloreda Mera (born 13 November 1965) is a Colombian lawyer, politician, writer, editor and newspaper director. He is serving as High Presidential Advisor for Coexistence and Citizen Security in the Administration of President Juan Manuel Santos Calderón. He previously served the government as Ambassador of Colombia to the Netherlands and as Minister of National Education of Colombia.

He has been a writer, editor, and director of the newspaper El País, founded in 1949 by his paternal grandfather Álvaro Lloreda Caicedo and great-uncles. His grandfather was director of El Pais for 25 years, followed by his father.

== Early life and education ==
Francisco José and his fraternal twin brother Rodrigo were born on 13 November 1965 in Santiago de Cali, Valle del Cauca to Rodrigo Hernán Lloreda Caicedo and Aura Lucía Mera, both from well-to-do families. His father directed El País, the newspaper founded by his own father. Entering public service, the elder Lloreda would become Minister of Foreign Affairs and Minister of National Defence. His mother was a journalist and was appointed as Director of Colcultura.

In August 1981 at the age of 15, Lloreda was diagnosed with osteogenic sarcoma on his leg; he was taken to New York City where he underwent chemotherapy and received a hip replacement at Memorial Sloan Kettering Cancer Center. After his successful recovery, Lloreda published his first book two years later, Mis Memorias del Memorial (My Memories of Memorial) (1983), in which he recounts his experience as a cancer patient and survivor. He completed his secondary studies at the Anglo Colombian School in 1985.

Lloreda graduated in 1990 from the Pontifical Xavierian University, where he received his Bachelor of Laws. In 1994 he received a Master of Public Administration from Columbia University in New York City. He later completed a Master's in Latin America Public Policy (2003) and a Doctorate of Philosophy (2010) from St Antony's College, Oxford.

== Early career ==
Lloreda started working at his family's newspaper, El Pais in Cali, Colombia, and became active in politics. He has moved between positions with the family newspaper, in government, starting at the local level; and academia. His variety of positions have given him experience in numerous leadership roles.

He was Private Secretary (or assistant) to the Mayor of Bogotá in 1988-1989. Lloreda held the position of Executive Director for the Colombian Federation of Local Governments from 1989 to 1991. He returned to graduate school for his first master's degree.

Following that, from 1994–1995, Lloreda served as Chief of Staff of the Mayor of Cali and the Municipal Secretary for Public Finances. He next was appointed as Director of the Local Planning Department of the Municipal Government of Cali from 1995 to 1997.

He served as Editor-in-Chief of El Pais from 1998 to 2002. After years including public service, he returned to graduate school for additional studies, as noted above.

== Marriage and family ==
Lloreda married María Cecilia Cabal Castro, a pediatric dentist, on 8 January 2000. They have two children together: Camilo (b. 2004) and Andrea (b. 2007).

== Career ==
=== Minister of Education ===
In 2000 at the age of 35, Lloreda was appointed by President Andrés Pastrana Arango as Minister of National Education replacing Germán Bula Escobar who had been with Pastrana since 1998. He was sworn in as the 77th Minister of National Education on 18 July 2000 by President Pastrana at a ceremony at the Palace of Nariño. He served in Pastrana's Cabinet until the end of his term on 7 August 2002.

In 2005 and 2006 he was Director of the Public Policy Observatory and simultaneously held the position of Professor at the Universidad Icesi in Cali, Colombia. He served again at El Pais as Editor-in-Chief from 2006 to 2007.

=== Ambassadorship ===
Lloreda was sworn in as ambassador on 9 May 2008 by President Álvaro Uribe Vélez at the Palace of Nariño, and presented his Letters of Credence in a ceremony to Her Majesty Queen Beatrix of the Netherlands on 2 July at Noordeinde Palace in The Hague. He served in this position until 2010.

Being dually accredited, Lloreda had earlier presented his credentials as Permanent Representative of Colombia to the Organisation for the Prohibition of Chemical Weapons at The Hague on Friday 6 June to Director General of the OPCW Rogelio Pfirter. Ex officio, he was also Representative of Colombia to the Assembly of State Parties to the International Criminal Court, the Administrative Council of the Permanent Court of Arbitration, and the Common Fund for Commodities.

=== Presidential Advisor ===
On 4 November 2010, while Lloreda was still serving as ambassador to the Netherlands, President Juan Manuel Santos Calderón appointed him as High Presidential Advisor for Coexistence and Citizen Security, a new cabinet-level position aimed at reducing crime in cities and its causes.

== Works ==
- Lloreda Mera, Francisco José (1983). Mis Memorias del Memorial [My Memories of the Memoir] (in Spanish). Bogotá: Circulo de lectores. ISBN 9788483862681. OCLC 460098712.
- Lloreda Mera, Francisco José (1992). Palabras Usadas: 10 Años de Opinión en Prensa [Words Used: 10 Years of Opinion in the Press] (in Spanish). Santiago de Cali: El País. ISBN 9789584430892. OCLC 542580529.
- Lloreda Mera, Francisco José (1992). Finanzas Municipales: Una Propuesta Integral de Fortalecimiento Local [Municipal Finance: A Comprehensive Proposal for Local Strengthening] (Thesis/Dissertation) (in Spanish). Bogotá: Faculty of Juridical and Socioeconomic Sciences, Pontifical Xavierian University. OCLC 39476659.
- Lloreda Mera, Francisco José (2003). Youth violence and education in Colombia, with particular reference to the case of Cali (Thesis/Dissertation). Department of Politics and International Relations, University of Oxford; Division of Social Sciences, St Antony's College.
- Lloreda Mera, Francisco José (2010). Public Policies for Reducing Violence, with particular reference to Youth Violence in Colombia (Thesis/Dissertation). Oxford: Department of Politics and International Relations, University of Oxford; Division of Social Sciences, St Antony's College. OCLC 650432875.
