= Caicedo (surname) =

Caicedo (Spanish pronunciation: [kajˈseðo]) is a surname. Notable people with the surname include:

- Jessica Caicedo (born 1994), Colombian boxer
- Patricia Caicedo (born 1969), Colombian-Spanish singer and musicologist
- Paulo Caicedo (born 1969), Ecuadorian cyclist

== Paternal family name ==
- Amparo Caicedo (born 1965), Colombian sprinter
- Andrés Caicedo (1951–1977), Colombian writer
- Andrés Caicedo (weightlifter) (born 1997), Colombian weightlifter
- Aurelio Caicedo Ayerbe (1921–1998), Colombian lawyer and diplomat
- Beder Caicedo (born 1992), Ecuadorian footballer
- Déiber Caicedo (born 2000), Colombian footballer
- Edison Caicedo (born 1990), Ecuadorian footballer
- Felipe Caicedo (born 1988), Ecuadorian footballer
- Flavio Caicedo (born 1988), Ecuadorian footballer
- Geovanny Caicedo (born 1981), Ecuadorian footballer
- Jonathan Caicedo (born 1993), Ecuadorian cyclist
- Jonathan Caicedo (footballer) (born 1996), Ecuadorian footballer
- José Caicedo (born 2002), Colombian footballer
- Juan Fernando Caicedo (born 1989), Colombian footballer
- Juan Caicedo (footballer, born 1996), Colombian footballer
- Linda Caicedo (born 2005), Colombian footballer
- Luis Caicedo (footballer, born 1979), Ecuadorian footballer
- Luis Caicedo (footballer, born 1992), Ecuadorian footballer
- Luis Caicedo (footballer, born 1996), Colombian footballer
- Moisés Caicedo (born 2001), Ecuadorian footballer
- Pavel Caicedo (born 1977), Ecuadorian footballer
- Richard Caicedo (born 1992), Ecuadorian footballer
- Sebastián Caicedo (born 1981), Colombian actor

== Maternal family name ==
- Álvaro Lloreda Caicedo (1903–1985), Colombian politician and newspaper executive
- Andrés Jiménez (BMX rider) (born 1986), Colombian cyclist
- Cristian Penilla (born 1991), Ecuadorian footballer
- Diego Calderón (Colombian footballer) (born 1989), Colombian footballer
- Félix Torres (footballer, born 1997), Ecuadorian footballer
- Jorge Zules Caicedo (born 1991), Colombian footballer
- José Enrique Angulo (born 1995), Ecuadorian footballer
- Rodrigo Hernán Lloreda Caicedo (1942–2000), Colombian lawyer and politician

== Both maternal and paternal family name ==
- Carina Caicedo (born 1987), Ecuadorian footballer
- Marcos Caicedo (born 1991), Ecuadorian footballer
- Walberto Caicedo (born 1992), Ecuadorian footballer
