= Lloreda =

Lloreda is a surname. Notable people with this surname include:

- Álvaro Lloreda Caicedo (1903—1985), Colombian industrialist, newspaper publisher, and politician
- Francisco José Lloreda Mera (born 1965), Colombian lawyer, politician, writer, editor and newspaper director
- Jaime Lloreda (born 1980), Panamanian basketball player
- Laura Daniela Lloreda (born 1991), Puerto Rican-born naturalized Mexican citizen and volleyball player
- Rodrigo Hernán Lloreda Caicedo (1942—2000), Colombian lawyer and politician
