= Caicedo =

Caicedo may refer to:

- Caicedo, Antioquia, a municipality in Colombia
- Caicedo (surname), including people with the name:
  - Moisés Caicedo (born 2001), Ecuadorian footballer
