= Eduardo Pizarro Leongómez =

Colombian ambassador

Colombia Ambassador to the Netherlands
- Incumbent
- Assumed office 7 December 2011
- President: Juan Manuel Santos Calderón
- Preceded by: Francisco José Lloreda Mera

Personal details
- Spouse: María Dolores Jaramillo
- Relations: Carlos Pizarro Leongómez (brother)
- Education: Institut d'Études Politiques de Paris (DEA, 1985); Externado University (MA, 1984); Paris 8 University (BA, 1975)
- Profession: Sociologist

Eduardo Pizarro Leongómez is a Colombian sociologist and political analyst. He was a co-founder, former director, and professor of the Political Studies and Foreign Relations Institute of the National University of Colombia; he served as Presiding Member of the National Commission for Reparation and Reconciliation of Colombia, CNRR as a delegate of the Vice President of Colombia from 2005 to 2009; and is a member of the Board of Directors of the Trust Fund for Victims of the International Criminal Court. He also was the Ambassador of Colombia to the Netherlands in 2011.

== Ambassadorship ==
On 19 September 2011, President Juan Manuel Santos Calderón announced the designation of Pizarro as the new Ambassador of Colombia to the Netherlands in replacement of Francisco José Lloreda Mera, who had been in the post since 2007.

He was sworn in as ambassador on 2 December by Patti Londoño Jaramillo, Deputy Minister of Multilateral Affairs of the Ministry of Foreign Affairs of Colombia, and presented his Letters of Credence in a ceremony to Her Majesty Queen Beatrix of the Netherlands on 7 December at Noordeinde Palace in The Hague. Being dually accredited, Pizarro also presented his credentials as Permanent Representative of Colombia to the Organisation for the Prohibition of Chemical Weapons at The Hague on Thursday 19 January 2012 to Director General of the OPCW Ahmet Üzümcü. Ex officio, he was also Representative of Colombia to the Assembly of State Parties to the International Criminal Court, the Administrative Council of the Permanent Court of Arbitration, and the Common Fund for Commodities.

== Personal life ==
I'm the son of an viceadmiral, brother of two assassinated guerrilla members; my sister was a member of the M-19 and my other brothers and I were communists.

— Eduardo Pizarro Leongómez,

== Selected works ==
- Pizarro Leongómez, Eduardo; Peñaranda, Ricardo (1991). Las FARC (1949-1966): De la Autodefensa A la Combinación de todas las Formas de Lucha [The FARC (1949-1066): From Self-Defence to a Combination of All Forms of Battle]. Sociologia y Politica (in Spanish). Bogotá: Tercer Mundo Editores. ISBN 978-958-601-345-1. LCCN 92124982. OCLC 25510426.
- Pizarro Leongómez, Eduardo (1996). Insurgencia Sin Revolución: La Guerrilla en Colombia en una Perspectiva Comparada [Insurgence Without Revolution: Guerilla in Colombia a Comparative Perspective]. Sociología y Política (in Spanish). Bogotá: Tercer Mundo Editores. ISBN 978-958-601-648-3. OCLC 35675044.
- Sevilla, Rafael; Haldenwang, Christian von; Pizarro Leongómez, Eduardo (1999). Kolumbien: Land der Einsamkeit? [Colombia: Land of Loneliness?] (in German). Bad Honnef: Horlemann. ISBN 978-3-89502-095-7. LCCN 99521892. OCLC 45243713.
- Pizarro Leongómez, Eduardo (January 2002). La Atomización Partidista en Colombia: El Fenómeno de las Micro-empresas Electorales [The Partisan Atomization in Colombia: The Electoral Micro-Enterprise Phenomenon] (PDF). Working paper (in Spanish). Vol. 292. Notre Dame, Indiana: The Helen Kellogg Institute for International Studies. OCLC 750546194.
- Pizarro Leongómez, Eduardo (2004). Una Democracia Asediada: Balance y Perspectivas del Conflicto Armado en Colombia [A Beleaguered Democracy: Balance and Perspectives of the Armed Conflict in Colombia]. Colección Vitral (in Spanish). Bogotá: Grupo Editorial Norma. ISBN 978-958-04-7928-4. LCCN 2004453275. OCLC 56421448.
  - Elizabeth Burgos (8 May 2008). "Eduardo Pizarro Leongómez, Una democracia asediada. Balance y perspectivas del conflicto armado en Colombia". Nuevo Mundo Mundos Nuevos. doi:10.4000/nuevomundo.31583.
- Mainwaring, Scott; Bejarano, Ana María; Pizarro Leongómez, Eduardo (2006). The Crisis of Democratic Representation in the Andes. Stanford, California: Stanford University Press. ISBN 978-0-8047-5278-7. LCCN 2006005159. OCLC 64098483.
- Pizarro Leongómez, Eduardo (2011). Las FARC 1949-2011: De Guerrilla Campesina a Máquina de Guerra [The FARC 1949-2011: From Farmer's Guerilla to War Machine]. Colección Documentos (in Spanish). Bogotá: Grupo Editorial Norma. ISBN 978-958-45-3641-9. OCLC 775652745.
