= Morejón =

Morejón is a surname. Notable people with the surname include:

- Adrian Morejón (born 1999), Cuban baseball player
- Danny Morejón (1930–2009), Cuban-born American baseball player
- Dariel Morejón (born 1998), Cuban football player
- Diego Morejón, Ecuadorian politician
- Frank Morejón (born 1986), Cuban baseball player
- Genovevo Morejón (born 1954), Cuban track and field athlete
- Glenda Morejón (born 2000), Ecuadorian racewalker
- Luis Morejón (born 1973), Ecuadorian tennis player
- Nancy Morejón (born 1944), Cuban poet, critic, and essayist
- Oswaldo Morejón (born 1959), Bolivian racewalker
