= Santa María de Cayón =

- Municipality
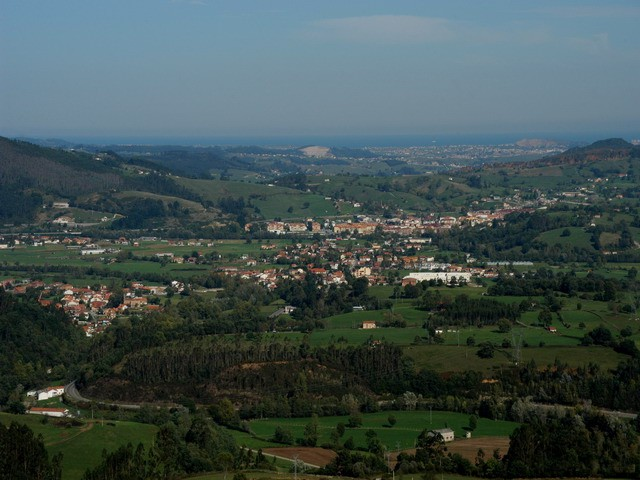
- Cayón Valley

- Flag Coat of arms

- Location of Santa María de Cayón

- Location of Santa María de Cayón in Cantabria Location of Santa María de Cayón in Spain
- Coordinates: 43°18′41″N 3°51′9″W
- Country: Spain
- Autonomous community: Cantabria
- Province: Cantabria
- Comarca: Valles Pasiegos
- Judicial district: Medio Cudeyo
- Capital: Santa María de Cayón

Government
  - Alcalde: Francisco Javier Viar Fernández (2024) (PP)

Area
  - Total: 48.23 km^{2} (18.62 sq mi)
- Elevation: 96 m (315 ft)

Population (2025-01-01)
  - Total: 9,538
  - Density: 197.8/km^{2} (512.2/sq mi)
- Demonym(s): Cayonés, esa
- Time zone: UTC+1 (CET)
  - Summer (DST): UTC+2 (CEST)
- Official language(s): Spanish
- Website: Official website

Santa María de Cayón is a municipality in the province and autonomous community of Cantabria, northern Spain. According to the 2020 census, it has a population of 9,167 inhabitants.

The biggest town inside the municipality is not its capital (where the town hall is located, and which gives name to the municipality), but rather the town of Sarón.

== Sister cities or towns ==
Santa María de Cayón is twinned with Gujan-Mestras, France

== Towns ==
- San Román.
- La Penilla.
- Argomilla.
- La Encina.
- Sarón.
- Santa María de Cayón (capital).
- La Abadilla.
- Esles.
- Totero.
- Lloreda.

== Mayors since 1979 ==
The following table lists every mayor of Santa María de Cayón since 1979:

Period	Name	Party
1979–1983	Fernando Astobiza	Independent
1983–1989	Fernando Astobiza	Alianza Popular (AP)
1989–1999	Fernando Astobiza	People's Party (PP)
1999–2003	Gastón Gómez Ruiz	Independent
2003–2020	Gastón Gómez Ruiz	People's Party (PP)
2020–2021	Francisco Javier Viar Fernández	People's Party (PP)
2021–2024	María Pilar del Río Ruiz de la Prada	Independent
2024–present	Francisco Javier Viar Fernández	People's Party (PP)
