= Gonzalo Gutiérrez Reinel =

Peruvian diplomat

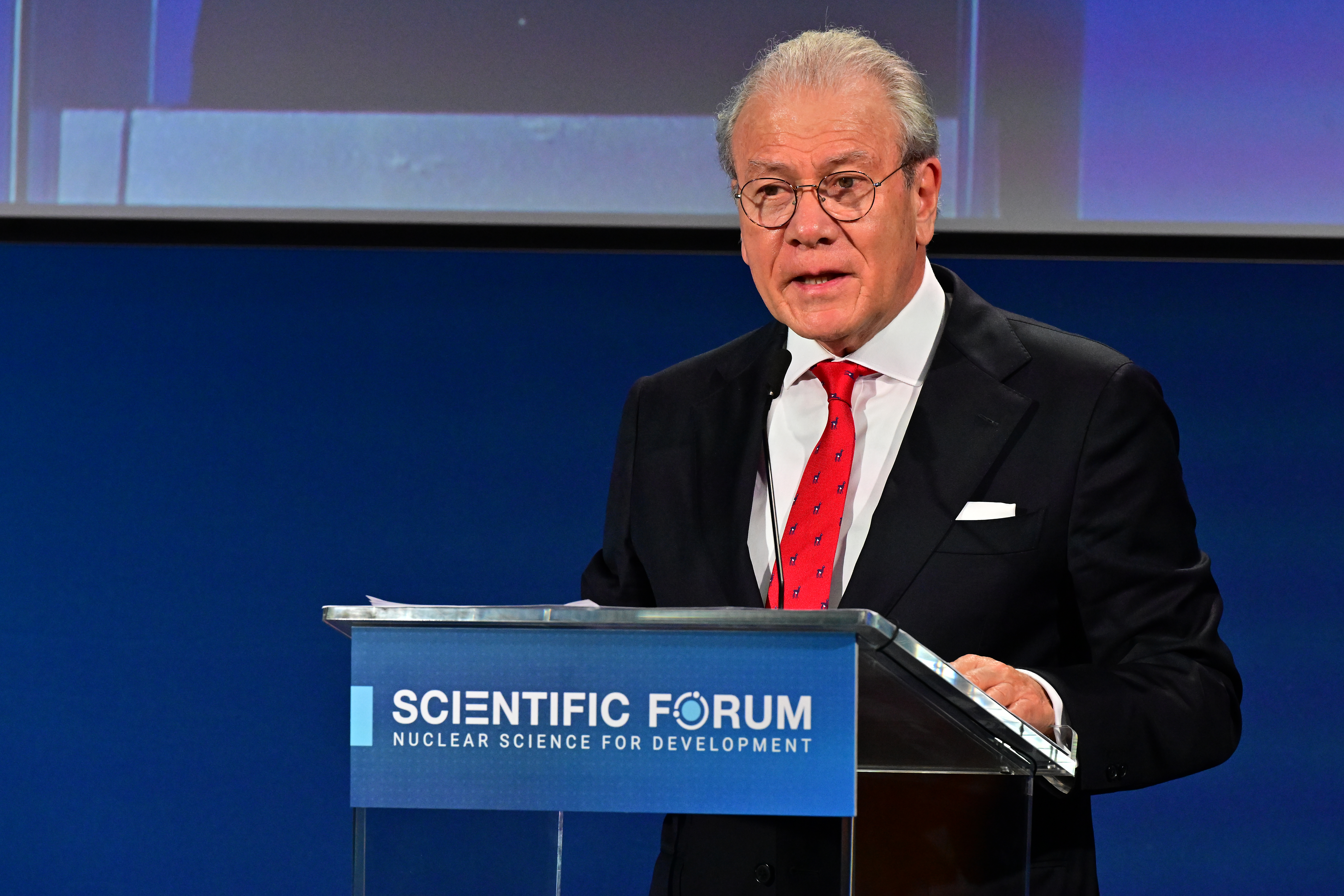

Secretary-General of the Andean Community
- In office Ambassador to Belgium and the European Union: January 1, 2017 – November 29, 2022 As of May 1st 2023, he was appointed Director of the Diplomatic Academy of Peru. September 1st 2023 he is appointed Secretary General of the Andean Community.
- Preceded by: Cristina Ronquillo de Blödorn
- Succeeded by: Luis Enrique Chavez Basagoitia

Permanent Representative of Peru to the United Nations
- In office May 2009 – September 2011
- Preceded by: Jorge Voto-Bernales Gatica
- Succeeded by: Enrique Armando Román Morey

Personal details
- Born: May 10, 1955; 71 years ago Lima, Peru

Gonzalo Alfonso Gutiérrez Reinel (born 10 May 1955 in Lima) is a Peruvian diplomat. From June 23, 2014 to April 2, 2015 he was Minister of Foreign Affairs under President Ollanta Humala. In 2009 he was appointed Peruvian ambassador to the United Nations, in New York. From 2011 to 2014 he was the ambassador of Peru to the People's Republic of China and non-resident ambassador to Mongolia, Pakistan and North Korea. From 2017 to 2022 he was the appointed ambassador to Belgium, Luxembourg and the European Union. As of May 1, 2023 he was appointed Director of the Diplomatic Academy of Peru. On September 1, 2023, he takes the post of Secretary General of the Andean Community.

== Early life ==
Gonzalo Gutiérrez Reinel studied at the Champagnat School and the Catholic University, in Lima, Peru. He entered the Diplomatic Service of Peru on January 1, 1978. On January 11, 2011, Gonzalo Gutiérrez was elected by acclamation Vice president of the United Nations Economic and Social Council, ECOSOC, on behalf of the group of Latin American and Caribbean countries. On May 20, 2011, Peru was elected, with the support of 136 countries, a member of the United Nations Human Rights Council for the period 2011–2014 in recognition of Peru's democratic foreign policy and promotion of human rights either nationally and abroad through diplomatic missions, particularly representations in New York and Geneva. At the end of June 2011, Gonzalo Gutiérrez, together with Ecuadorian, Diego Morejón, as permanent representatives of their respective governments to the UN, registered the maritime boundary agreement signed between Peru and Ecuador on May 2, 2011. Gutierrez was part of the negotiating team of the Peru-United States Free Trade Agreement. In the Diplomatic Academy of Peru he was Professor of International Economic Organizations and International Politics. He has been Professor of International Politics in the San Martin de Porres University and the UPC University in Lima, Peru.

=== Studies ===
- Career Diplomat, Diplomatic Academy of Peru.
- Bachelor in International Relations, Diplomatic Academy of Peru.
- Master in International Politics obtained at the Paul H. Nitze School of Advanced International Studies at Johns Hopkins University in Washington D.C.
- Postgraduate courses at the London School of Economics and Political Science in London and JFK School of Government, Harvard University.

== Diplomatic career ==
Among the many positions held, he has been Under Secretary of Economic Affairs, executive director of the Office of Economic Promotion, Under Secretary in charge of America and Director for South America.

From the beginning of the second government of Alan García, on July 28, 2006, Ambassador Gutierrez was the Deputy Minister and General Secretary of Foreign Affairs, a position he held until April 20, 2009. He was replaced in the aforementioned function by Ambassador Néstor Popolizio Bardales.

In early 2007, the Peruvian government gave him the delicate mission of traveling to Gaza to free Jaime Rázuri, a kidnapped Peruvian photographer. Once he achieved the goal that the government had set in human rights and with the active collaboration of friendly governments, Gonzalo Gutiérrez Reinel returned to Peru accompanied by the aforementioned photographer. This was the first time in Peruvian history that the government entrusts a task of this nature to an official of such a high level, since by law, the position then held by Gonzalo Gutierrez as Deputy Minister and General Secretary of Foreign Affairs was that of the country's first public official.

During 2008 he served as Chairman of the Meeting of Senior Officials (SOM) of the Asia-Pacific Economic Cooperation Forum (APEC)

As a diplomatic official, Gonzalo Gutiérrez has served in the Representation of Peru to the United Nations in New York, in the Embassy of Peru to the United States of America, in the Permanent Representation to International Organizations based in Geneva and in the Embassy of the Peru in Chile.

On March 16, 2009, Supreme Resolution 102-2009-RE is published in the Official Gazette El Peruano, appointing Gonzalo Gutiérrez Reinel as Permanent Representative of Peru to the United Nations Organization based in New York. He took the position in May of that year.

On October 12, 2011, Supreme Resolution 382-2011-RE was published, whereby he was appointed Peruvian ambassador to the People's Republic of China. On November 1, 2011, he took the position as ambassador of Peru in the People's Republic of China, non-resident ambassador in Mongolia, Pakistan and North Korea.

Since January 1, 2017 he has been ambassador of Peru in Belgium, Luxembourg and the European Union.

As of May 1, 2023 he was appointed Director of the Diplomatic Academy of Peru.

On September 1, 2023, he is unanimously elected Secretary General of the Andean Community.

PUBLISHED WORKS

- “Dispute settlement in the World Trade Organization: the case of Peru against France and the European Community by the commercial designation of mollusks” (1996)
- "The Institutional Evolution of the Andean Integration Process" (1996)
- “The Prehistory of the WTO: the creation of the GATT and the entry of Peru” (1999)
- “El Pisco: notes for the international defense of the denomination of Peruvian origin” (2003).
- "Geoffrey Household, The War, the Literature and Pisco" (2010).
- "The Development of the Appellation of Origin Pisco" (2011).
- "The Chinese Empire and the News on Pisco" (2011).
- "Pisco was not born in Chile" (2016).
- "Potato, Peru and Belgium" (2018).
- "Peru and the Free Trade" (2017).
- "Pisco Elqui, the misleading name" (2019).
- "Pisco: the first reference to its name"(2020).
- "Pisco, its name its history" (2020).
