= Andean Parliament =

International parliament

Andean Parliament Parlamento Andino
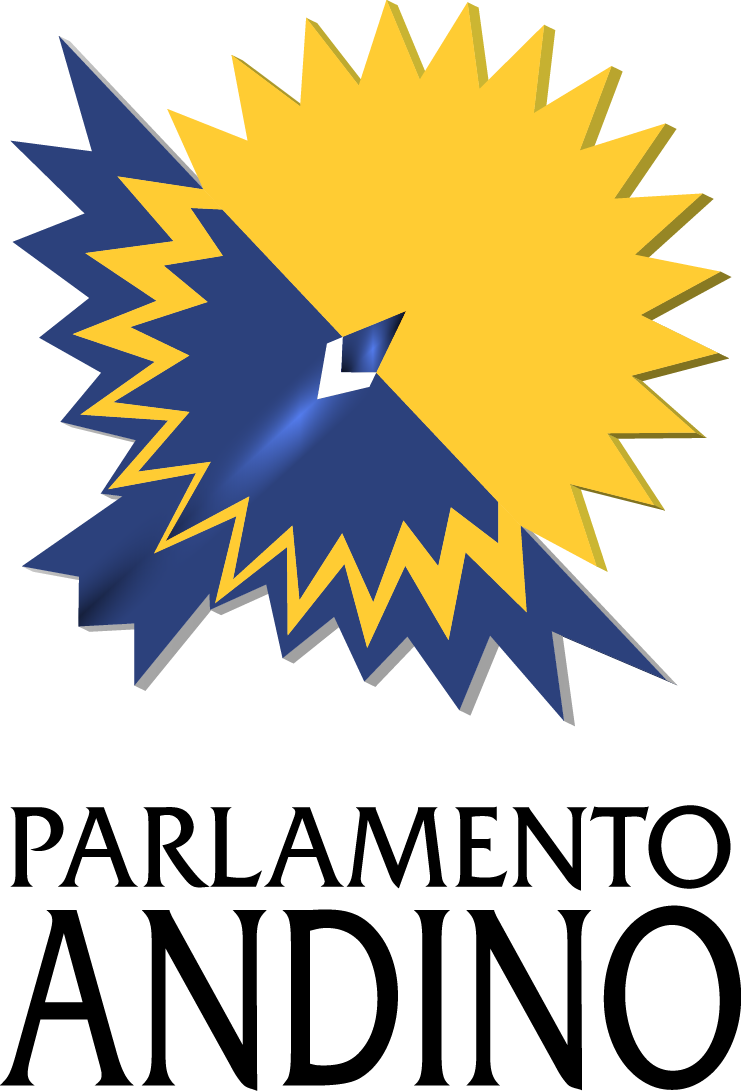

History
- Founded: October 25, 1979

Leadership
- President: Cristina Reyes Hidalgo, Ecuador
- Vice-President: Sergio Gahona, Chile
- Vice-President: Martha Ruiz, Colombia
- Vice-President: Mirian Liduvina, Ecuador
- Vice-President: Eduardo Chiliquinga, Peru

Structure
- Seats: 25 parliamentarians
- Political groups: Bolivia (5): MAS-IPSP: 5; Chile (5): PS: 1; UDI: 1; PCCh: 1; RN:1; PR: 1; Colombia (5): CH: 2; PLC: 1; AV: 1; CD: 1; Ecuador (5): ADN: 3; RC - RETO: 2; Peru (5): FP: 1; JP: 1; OBRAS: 1; PBG: 1; RP:1

Meeting place
- Bogotá, Colombia

Website
- www.parlamentoandino.org

The Andean Parliament is the governing and deliberative body of the Andean Community, conformed by representatives of its four member states Bolivia, Colombia, Ecuador and Peru, and one associate member, Chile. It is composed of 25 parliamentarians, five representing each state.

It was created on 25 October 1979, in La Paz, Bolivia, through the Constitutive Treaty signed by the chancellors of the five member states, including Venezuela at the time. It entered into force in January 1984. Venezuela abandoned both the Andean Community and the Parliament in 2006. Chile joined the Parliament in 2015, despite not being a full member of the Andean Community.

The Andean Parliament has its headquarters in Bogotá and is administered by the Secretary General. In addition, each country has national headquarters that serve as liaison and coordination bodies.

The main functions of the Andean Parliament include legislative harmonization in its member countries, permanent and active representation of the peoples of the region, guaranteeing their participation and strengthening of the integration process, and parliamentary management through the political control of institutions of the Andean Integration System (SAI).

== History ==
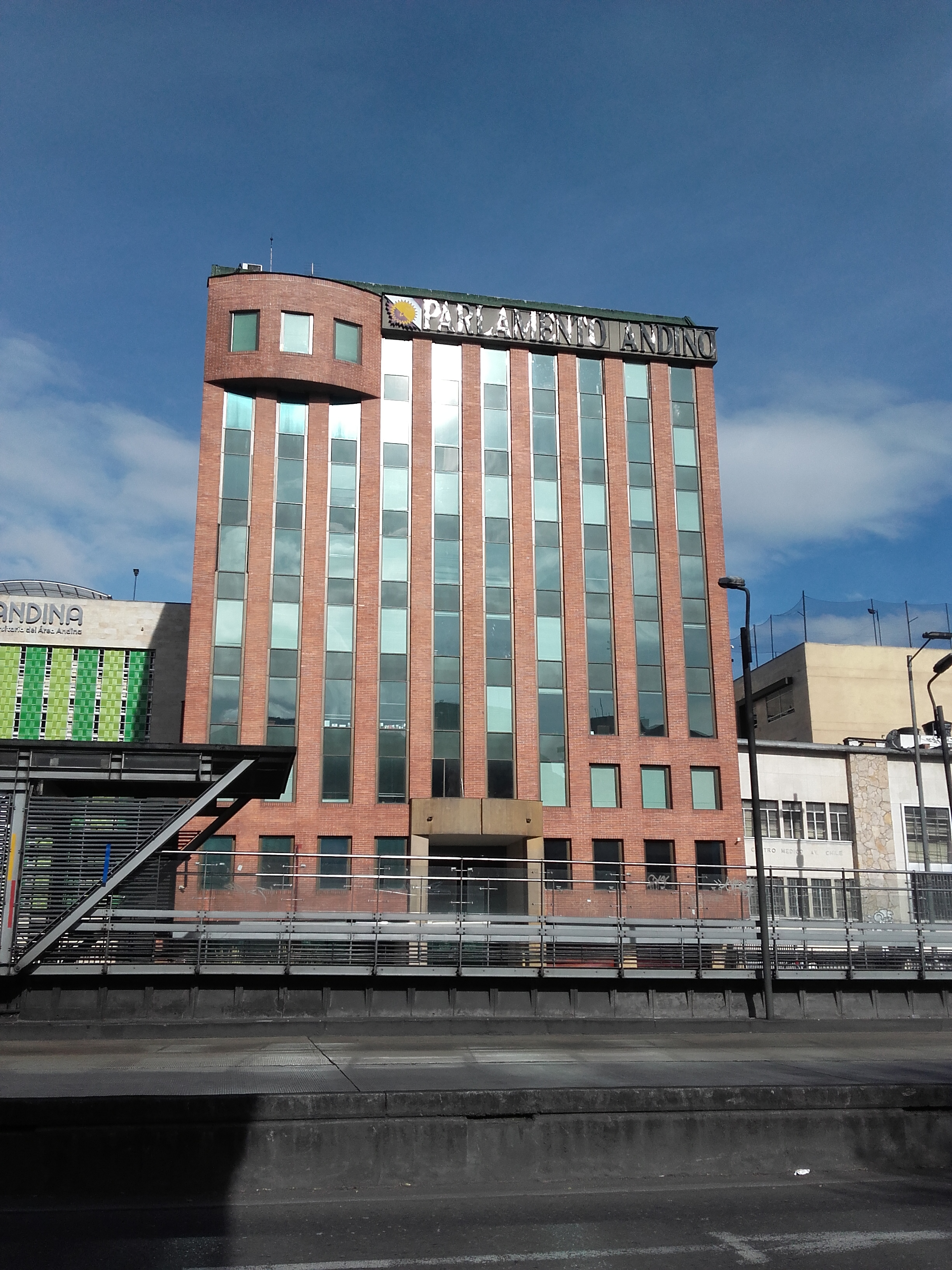
Headquarters of the Andean Parliament in Bogotá, Colombia

The Andean Parliament is the political organ, deliberative, representative of the people, as well as guarantor of the rights and democracy in the Andean Community.

The origins of the Andean Parliament go back to 1966 with the Bogotá Agreement, drawn up on the recommendation of ECLAC under the Montevideo Treaty of 1960. With the Cartagena Agreement, signed on May 26, 1969, the five countries met In what was originally called the Andean Pact, when its legal norms and provisions were established.2 Its objective was to strengthen its economies through free trade, tariff elimination and the customs union. Its Constitutive Treaty was signed by the chancellors of Bolivia, Colombia, Ecuador, Peru and Venezuela. Its first headquarters were in Lima, then later moved to Bogota.

Venezuelan diplomat Milos Alcalay served as Secretary General of the Andean Parliament (1984–1985) and as Permanent Secretary of the Andean Parliament (Bogotá, 1985–1989). Subsequently, in 1996, through the Trujillo Protocol modifying the Cartagena Agreement, the governments of the subregion granted it supranational powers, defining it as the Political Control Unit of the Andean Integration System (SAI).

Its representatives were initially elected by the national congresses of the member countries. According to the Protocol of Trujillo, approved on March 10, 1996, its representatives would be elected for a period of five years directly by the respective member countries of the Andean Community; In Colombia they were by direct suffrage since the elections of March 14, 2010. It consisted of five members for each member country, which gave a total of twenty-five parliamentarians.

On April 22, 2006, Venezuela withdrew from the Andean Community and, therefore, from the Andean Parliament, denouncing the Treaty establishing the Cartagena Agreement. The reason given was the signing by Colombia and Peru of free trade agreements with the United States that distorted the CAN, according to the Venezuelan government. Later the Colombian legislature through law 1157 of 2007, which allowed the election in that country of parliamentarians by means of universal and direct suffrage, approved the salaries and commissions of the Andean parliamentarians. They would thus be paid with part of the budget of the State, when before they sat free of charge.

In October 2011, Spain, Mexico, and Panama became permanent observer members of the Andean Parliament. In 2016, Argentina became an observer member as well, followed by Turkey in 2019.

In 2015, Chile became a permanent member of the Andean Parliament.

== Missionary Axes ==
The Andean Parliament developed four missionary axes, which each axis seeking the integration of the peoples and the spreading of the values of Andean citizenship.

=== 1. Legislative Harmonization ===
It seeks to harmonize complementary criteria of the Andean countries. The Normative Frameworks, have the support of experts, academics, universities, multilateral agencies and specialized institutions. Together with academics of the body and teams of parliamentarians, the analysis of international treaties, constitutions and national laws, development plans drawn up by governments, is carried out as a comparative exercise.

=== 2. Citizen Participation ===
A fundamental axis as role of the organism in the region, through which the concepts of Open Parliament have been applied:

==== Youth and Youth Parliaments and universities ====
The "Andean Youth and University Parliaments" program seeks to renew the political class of the Andean countries and strengthen leadership among young people. Conformed in different cities of the region, with emphasis on areas of conflict and vulnerability. The participants enter into a constant training process through: the Agency's Technology Platform, chairs in social networks and participation in the Plenary Sessions of the organization, in international events and other spaces. In the same way, a complete program of scholarships and incentives has been established for leaders with better proposals and academic performance.

==== Schools to Parliament ====
'Schools to the Parliament' is a project that makes the selection of the Schools and carries out a day of development of play and learning activities. Through physical and digital tools such as "I am Andean Parliament" and "Join the Integration" students learn about the work of Andean parliamentarians, values of Andean citizenship and the riches of the region.

==== Documentation Center ====
The Documentation Center 'Simón Rodríguez' was established, specialising in legislative, integration and international law issues. Linked in a virtual way with the best libraries of national congresses and multilateral organizations such as the Library of Congress of Chile, or the Library of Congress of the United States. The Documentation Center offers its services free to the public of the countries of the region.

==== Inclusive Fairs for Integration ====
Inclusive Fairs include the exhibition of handicrafts, natural products and entrepreneurship of the cultures of each Andean country, with the purpose of including vulnerable populations such as mothers head of household, people reinserted into civil society, displaced by conflict, people with disabilities, Among others, in the support of our organism to its work. Likewise, monthly art exhibitions of new talents, Art students and positioned artists of the region are presented. These initiatives allow strategic alliances with Andean citizens for the development of community awareness and socio-cultural identity through art.

=== 3. Strengthening Integration ===
The Andean Parliament promotes and guides Latin American integration processes. To this end, it has been strengthening cooperation and inter-institutional work with Integration Parliaments such as Latin American, Central American, MERCOSUR, among others. In the same way, it has been working on projects with organizations such as:

- The Development Bank of Latin America and the Caribbean (CAF)
- Organization of American States (OAS)
- The Inter-American Development Bank (IADB)
- Latin American Energy Organization (OLADE)
- The Economic Commission for Latin America and the Caribbean (ECLAC)
- UN Women
- Pan American Health Organization (WHO / PAHO)
- Andean Health Organization
- Hipólito Unanue Agreement.

In addition, Andean parliamentarians have spearheaded the international spreading of crucial issues for the region, in integration forums such as the Euro-Latin American Parliamentary Assembly (EuroLat) and the Inter-Parliamentary Union (IPU).

=== 4. Political Control ===
The Cartagena Agreement grants the Andean Parliament the mission of exercising political control over the bodies of the Andean Integration System (SAI).

== Member states ==
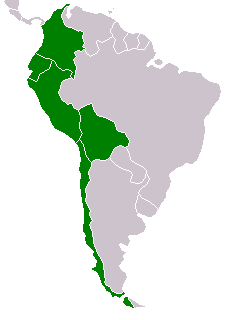
Current members of the Andean Parliament

- Bolivia
- Chile (since 2015)
- Colombia
- Ecuador
- Peru

Former members

- Venezuela (1979–2006)

== Elections ==
Article 2 of the Constitutive Treaty mentions that parliamentarians will be elected in universal and direct elections in the constitutive countries. However, not all member states have established these elections or ratified the additional protocols to hold these elections. According to the Constitutive Treaty, in case direct elections are not held by a country, the five members will be selected by the national legislature, according to their own protocols.

Currently, only Colombia, Ecuador and Peru have elections for the Andean Parliament, concurrent with their own general elections, similar to the Central American Parliament. Bolivia had direct elections in 2014, but after that parliamentarians have been selected by the National Assembly. Since joining the Andean Parliament, the National Congress of Chile has chosen their national representatives between members of the Senate and the Chamber of Deputies.

- Colombia: only had direct elections in 2010 and 2014.
- Ecuador: first direct election in 2013. The first elected members were Silvia Salgado, Pedro de la Cruz, Patricio Zambrano, the official Carmen Castro and Roberto Gómez.
- Peru: first direct election in 2006; each party must present a list of 5 candidates and 10 substitutes, all Peruvian-born (Ser peruano de nacimiento)

== See also ==
- Central American Parliament (Parlacen)
- Latin American Parliament (Parlatino)
- Mercosur Parliament
