= Sarón =

- Locality in Santa María de Cayón municipality
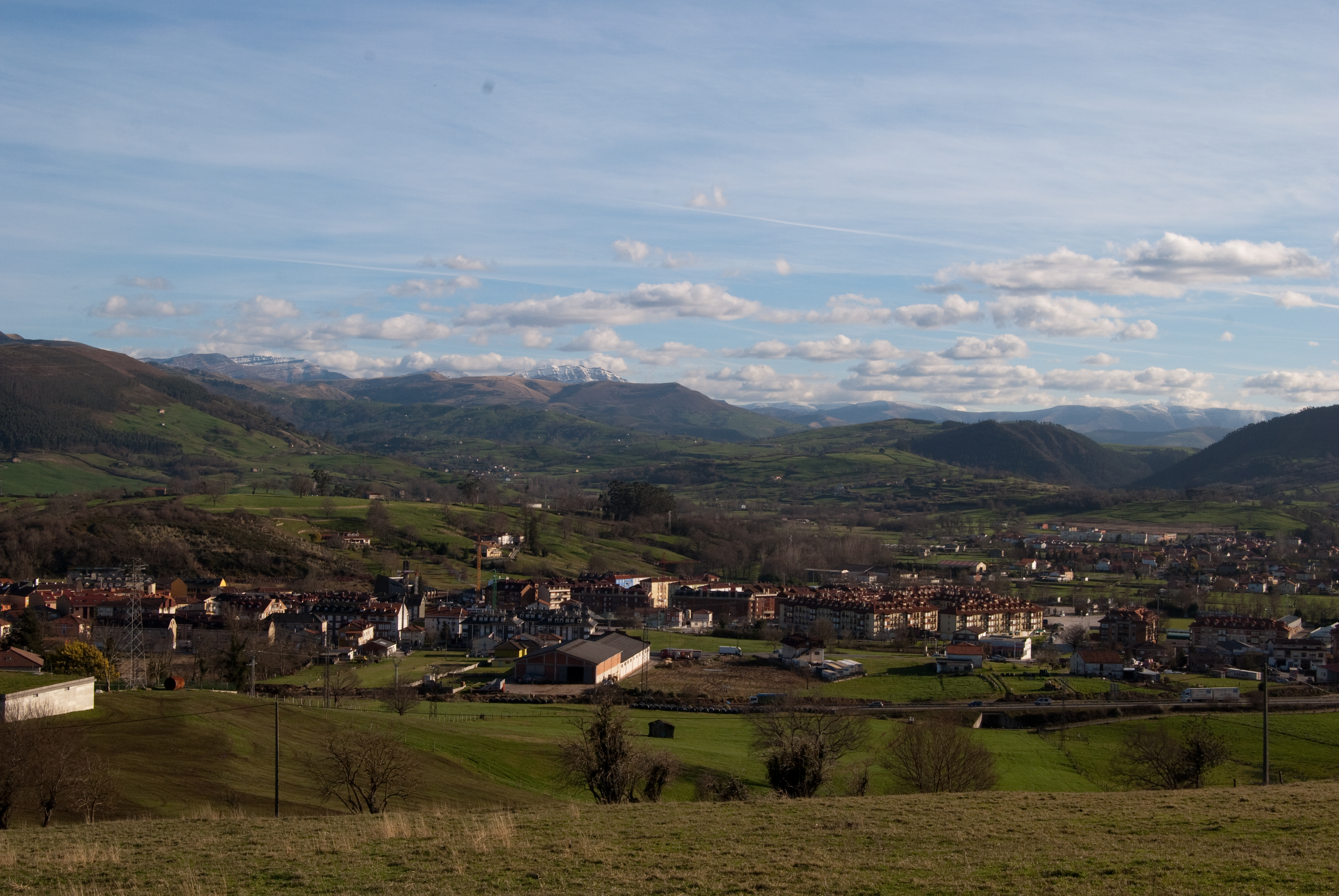
- View of the town centre from La Tejera neighbourhood, located at a higher altitude

- Location of Sarón in Cantabria Location of Sarón in Spain
- Coordinates: 43°19′25″N 3°51′13″W
- Country: Spain
- Autonomous community: Cantabria
- Province: Cantabria
- Comarca: Valles Pasiegos
- Judicial district: Medio Cudeyo
- Municipality: Santa María de Cayón
- Elevation: 90 m (300 ft)

Population
  - Total: 3 220
  - Rank: 28th in Cantabria

Sarón is the largest town in Santa María de Cayón, a municipality in Cantabria, Spain.

It was founded in 1876 in a road intersection by a landowner from nearby La Abadilla, whose name was Antonio Saro y Galbán. The name of the town comes from his first surname. In the town of La Penilla, 2 kilometres away, there is a Nestlé factory, which was the first one to open in Spain in 1905. One of the oldest buildings still standing in Sarón is the market, built in 1929.

As of 2020, its population was 3 220 people, of which 50.7% are male and 49.3% female.

== Notable people ==
- José Manuel Fernández García, music composer, born in 1956
