= Silvia Salgado (politician) =

Ecuadorian politician

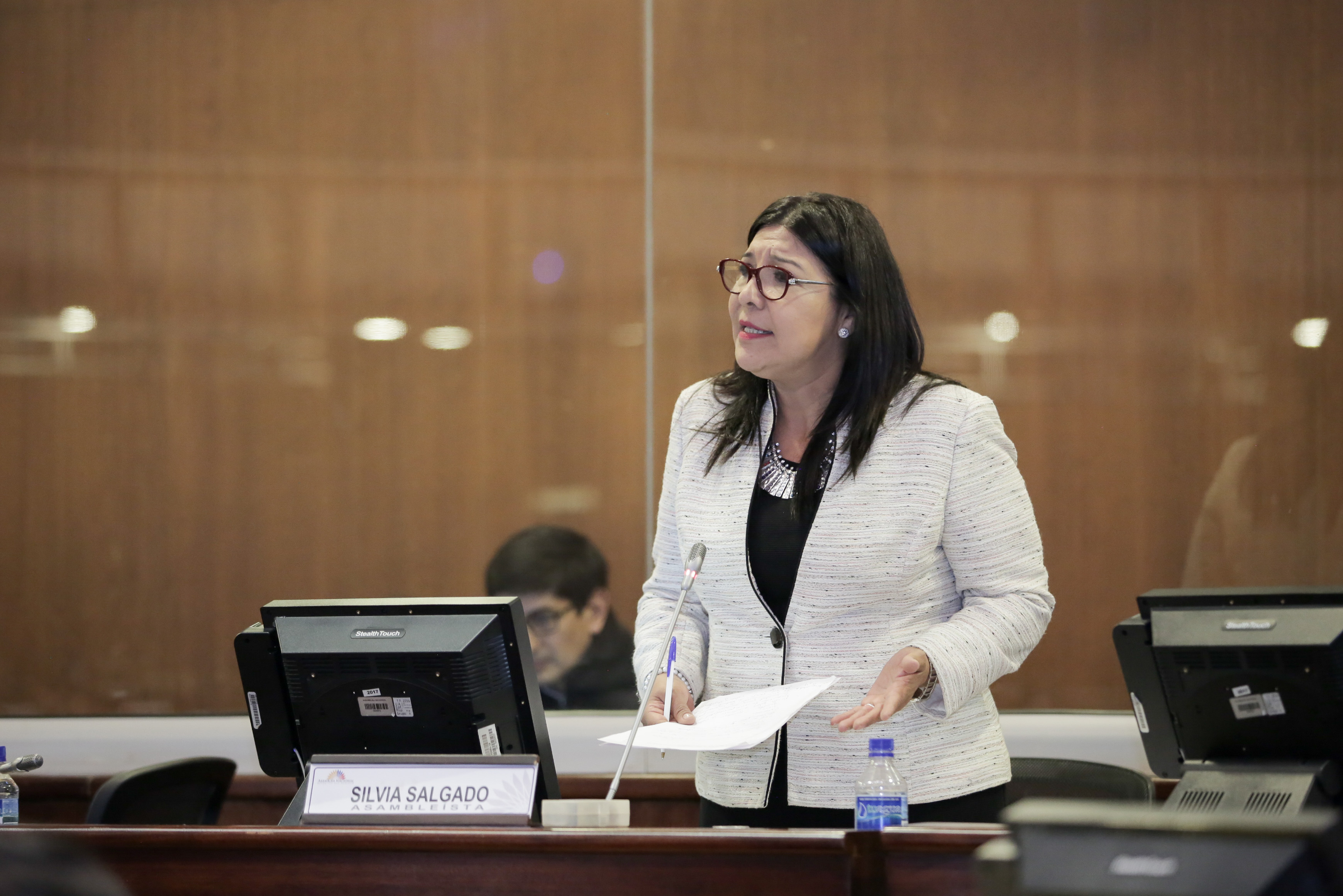
- in 2018 in the National Assembly
- Born: July 1, 1960 (age 65); Ibarra
- Other name: Silvia Betzabeth Salgado Andrade
- Education: Universidad_Técnica_del_Norte
- Occupation: politician
- Known for: Andean parliamentarian
- Political party: Ecuadorian Socialist Party

Silvia Betzabeth Salgado Andrade (born July 1, 1960) is an Ecuadorian politician. She has been a socialist leader, a member of the National Assembly and from 2013 a member of the Andean Parliament.

== Life ==
Salgado was born in Ibarra in 1960. She attended Ibarra Girls' College and the Universidad Técnica del Norte where she obtained a bachelor's degree in educational science.

She was active in the Federation of University Students of Ecuador and representative of the Revolutionary Front of the University Left. In 1976 she joined the Ecuadorian Socialist Party.

In 1988 she became an elected councilor of Ibarra, holding the position until 1991. In 1990 she entered the National Congress leading the group of women called Montoneras Patria Libre and made the symbolic delivery of the presidency of parliament to the socialist Edelberto Bonilla. Montoneras Patria Libre was a radical organisation who took political hostages and issued ultimatums.

Salgado was elected councilor of Ibarra again in 2002. For the 2004 she became the first woman to be a candidate for mayor of Ibarra. It was Pablo Jurado of the Democratic Left party who won the election.

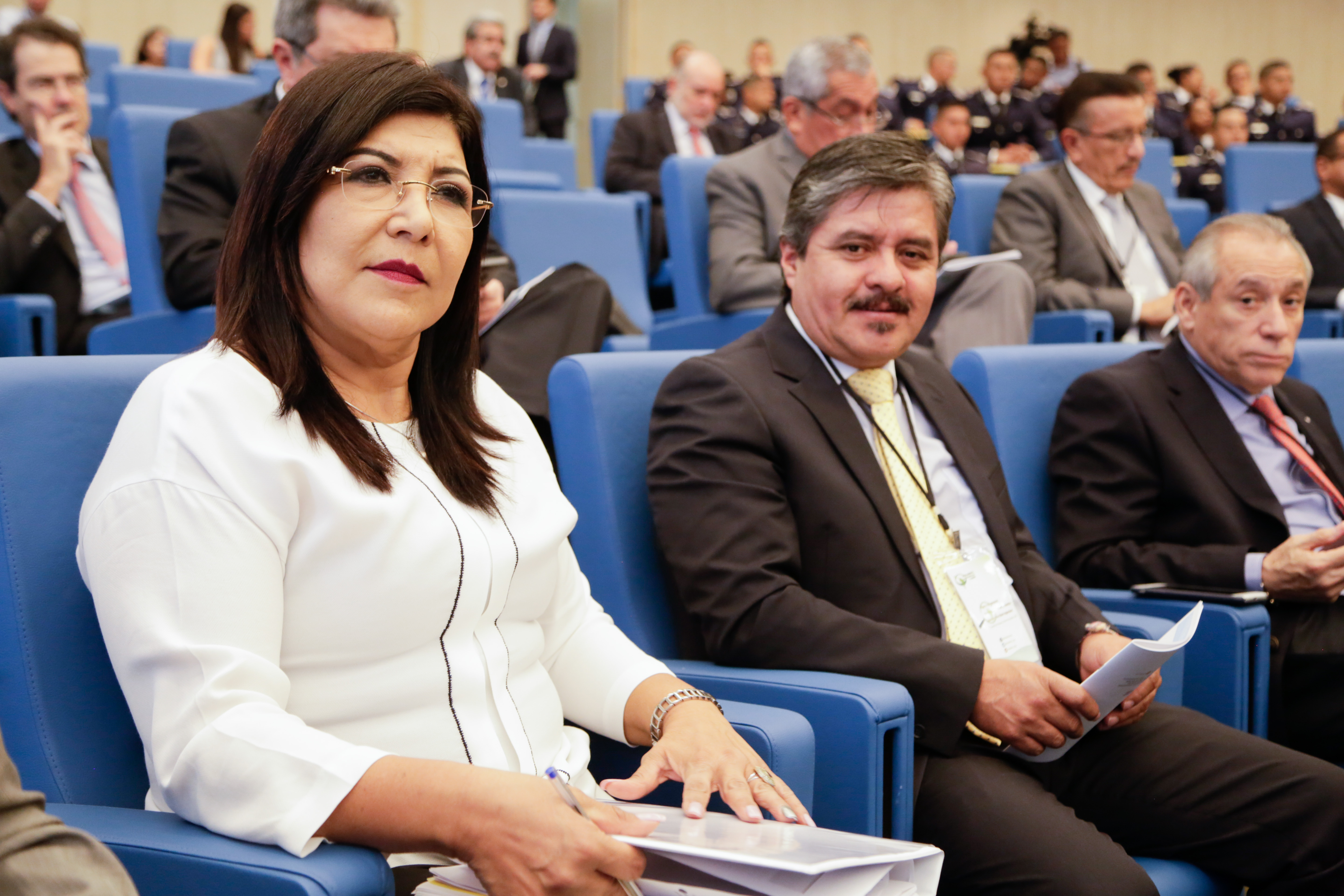
Salgado and other Assembly members participate in the 34th Assembly of the Latin American Parliament.

In the 2006 legislative elections, she was elected national deputy representing the province of Imbabura for the alliance between the Ecuadorian Socialist Party and the Pachakutik and New Country movements. Within the Congress she directed the commission of women, children, youth and the family. In November 2007 Salgado was dismissed from her position along with dozens of other deputies by the Constituent Assembly of 2007.

In the legislative elections of 2009, she was elected as a national assembly member for the Alianza PAIS official movement . During her time in the National Assembly, she served as president of the oversight and political control commission.

In 2013, Salgado was elected as an Andean parliamentarian as part of a share of the alliance between the Ecuadorian Socialist Party and the Alianza PAIS movement. This was the first direct election and the others elected were Pedro de la Cruz, Patricio Zambrano, the official Carmen Castro and Roberto Gómez

In 2018 she was in the National Assembly again serving on the Education committee.
