= Freddy Ehlers =

Ecuadorian politician

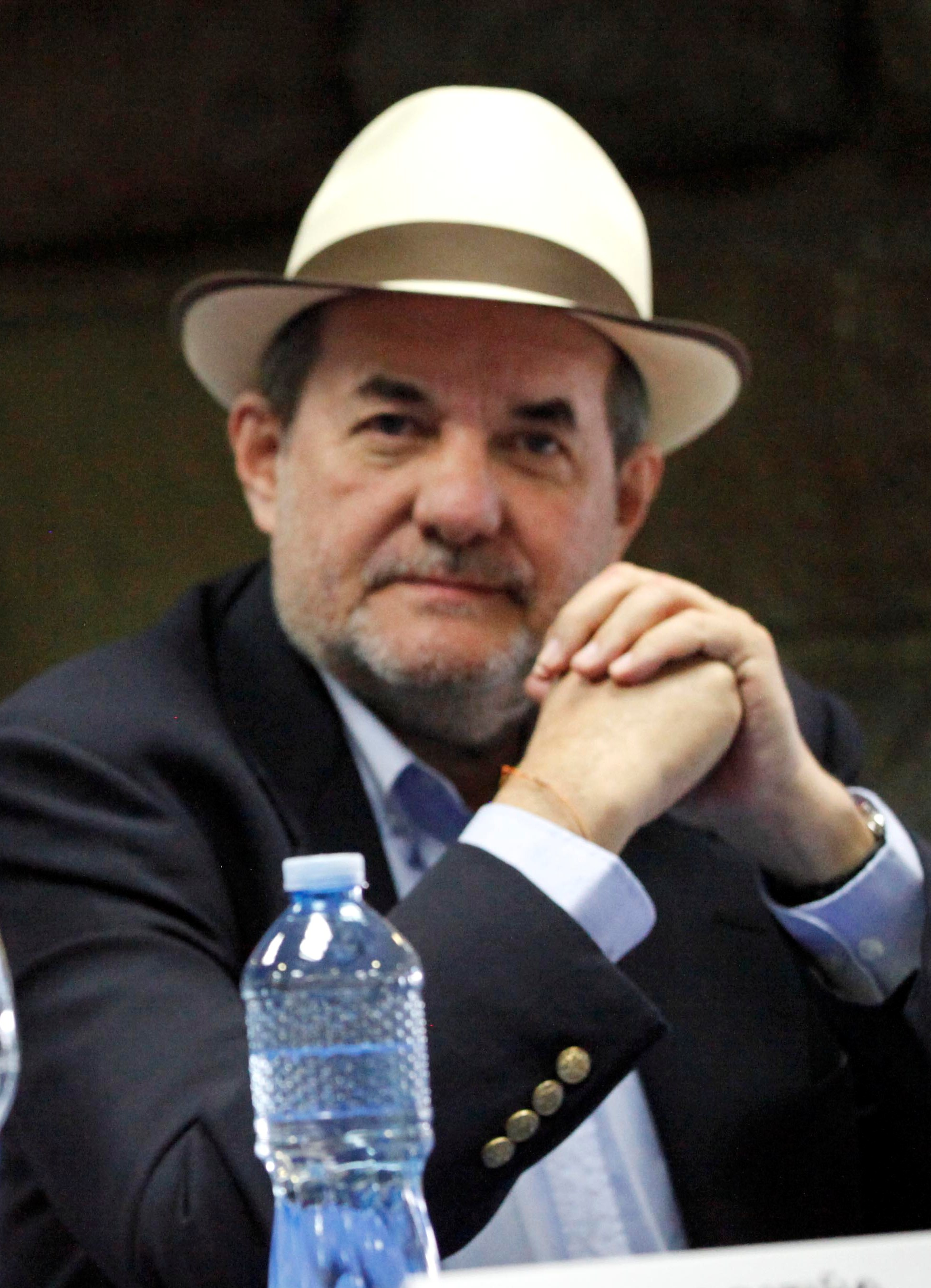
- Ehlers in November 2012

State Secretary for the Presidential Initiative for the Construction of a Society of Good Life
- In office 19 June 2013 – 24 May 2017
- President: Rafael Correa

Minister of Tourism
- In office 10 May 2010 – 19 June 2013
- President: Rafael Correa
- Preceded by: Vinicio Alvarado
- Succeeded by: Vinicio Alvarado

Andean Community of Nations Secretary-General
- In office 1 February 2007 – 7 May 2010
- Preceded by: Alfredo Fuentes Hernández
- Succeeded by: Adalid Contreras Baspineiro

Personal details
- Born: 30 November 1945 (age 80) Quito, Ecuador
- Education: Universidad Central del Ecuador

Freddy Ehlers Zurita (born 30 November 1945) is an Ecuadorian politician. He served as Ecuador's State Secretary for the Presidential Initiative for the Construction of a Society of Good Life from 2013 to 2017 during the Rafael Correa administration. Previously, he was Minister of Tourism from 10 May 2010 until June 2013. In 1996 and 1998, Ehlers stood candidate for the office of President of Ecuador. Between 1 February 2007 and 7 May 2010, Ehlers was the Secretary-General of the Andean Community of Nations

== Early life ==
Freddy Ehlers was born on 30 November 1945 in Quito. Ehlers has a degree in jurisprudence from the Universidad Central del Ecuador, and has studied Television studies in the Netherlands and the United States. Ehlers was a Richardson Scholar (exchange student) at Davidson College in 1964–1965, where he started Project of the Americas, a multi-campus student exchange organization with Ecuador.

== Professional life ==
Ehlers has been a journalist for thirty years in which he has produced over a thousand documentaries. In 1979 he started the series Let's talk about ourselves, which was the first program to show the cultural and natural values of the Andes. Between 1980 and 1988 he was director of the Program of Andean Television. In 1990 he began with the production of the series La Televisión, which emphasized environmental issues. It has been the most successful show by audience measurement in the journalism and opinion category in Ecuador between 1990 and 2006.

== Political career ==
In the 1996 elections and 1998 elections Ehlers was a candidate for the Ecuadorian presidency but both times did not win the election. On 20 October 2002, Ehlers was elected as a member of the Andean Parliament for Ecuador with 20% of the votes as a representative of the Movimiento Cívico Nuevo País. During his term, which ended in 2006, he became vice president of the same parliament. On 18 January 2007, Ehlers was chosen as Secretary-General of the Andean Community of Nations for a five-year term. Ehlers succeeded the Colombian Alfredo Fuentes Hernández, an interim Secretary-General. Ehlers formally started his function on 1 February 2007. His term of office was noted by his efforts to implement the mandate handed down to him by the Tarija summit of 2007. On 20 April 2010, he submitted his resignation, which became effective on 7 May 2010. He resigned to return to Ecuadorian politics. On 10 May 2010, he was named Minister of Tourism by President Rafael Correa.

On 19 June 2013, his term as Minister of Tourism ended and he was named State Secretary for the Presidential Initiative for the Construction of a Society of Good Life. In his new capacity he started the television series Acuerdo para el buen vivir on 15 October 2014. The program was meant to start a dialogue on how to reach a society of good life. Ehlers has also promoted the vision of his secretariat worldwide.

In July 2015, opposition politicians sought to have Ehler's secretariat closed, with Andrés Páez calling it "a symbol of obese bureaucracy". In April 2016, Ehlers stated that the budget and staff of his secretariat had decreased.

== Decorations ==
Ehlers received the Global 500 Roll of Honour by the UNEP in 1993 for his work in raising awareness amongst Ecuadorians for the environment.
