= Andean passport =

Passport for member countries of the Andean Community of Nations

Andean passport was the informal name given to passports for South American countries that are members of the Andean Community of Nations (ACN) and followed a similar design.

== Origin and use ==
The "Andean passport" common design was established in June 2001 pursuant to ACN Decisión 504. The standard model contained harmonised features of nomenclature and security based on the recommendations of the International Civil Aviation Organization (ICAO). The member states of the ACN agreed to phase in new Andean passports bearing the official name of the regional body in Spanish by January 2005, although previously issued national passports will be valid until their expiry date.

The passport model was followed by Bolivia, Ecuador, Peru and, until 2026, Venezuela.

== Basic features ==
The Andean passport features:

- a passbook type format with rounded edges measuring 88 millimetres (3.5 in) by 125 millimetres (4.9 in).
- a cover and back cover in “bordeaux” color.
- legends printed in gold color.
- Above the national seal of the issuing country, the cover has the legend "COMUNIDAD ANDINA", which is centered and printed in larger fonts. Below the seal is printed the official name of the member country.
- the bottom of the cover has the word "PASAPORTE" (Spanish), with "PASSPORT" (English) immediately below in smaller type.

== Gallery of Andean passports ==
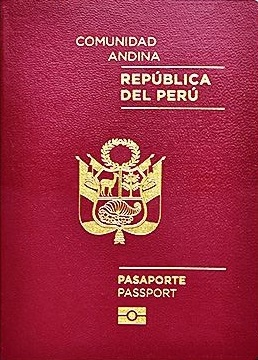
(Peru) Peruvian passport

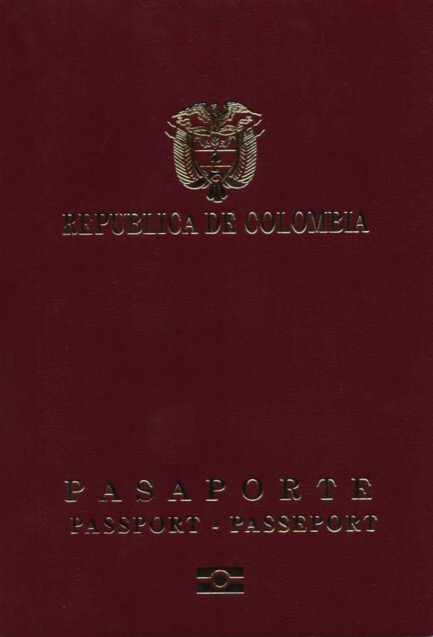
(Colombia) Colombian Passport
