= Bajo Calima =

- Populated center
- Location in Valle del Cauca and Colombia Bajo Calima (Colombia)
- Coordinates: 3°59′56.9″N 76°58′28.0″W
- Country: Colombia
- Department: Valle del Cauca
- Municipality: Buenaventura municipality
- Elevation: 160 ft (50 m)

Population (2018)
  - Total: 1,162
- Time zone: UTC-5 (Colombia Standard Time)

Bajo Calima is a populated center of Colombia in Buenaventura Municipality, Valle del Cauca Department in Colombia.

== Climate ==
Bajo Calima has an extremely wet tropical rainforest climate (Af).

Climate data for Bajo Calima, Buenaventura, elevation 50 m (160 ft), (1981–2010)
Month	Jan	Feb	Mar	Apr	May	Jun	Jul	Aug	Sep	Oct	Nov	Dec	Year
Mean daily maximum °C (°F)	29.8 (85.6)	30.4 (86.7)	30.5 (86.9)	30.6 (87.1)	30.4 (86.7)	30.1 (86.2)	30.0 (86.0)	30.0 (86.0)	29.8 (85.6)	29.6 (85.3)	29.5 (85.1)	29.6 (85.3)	30 (86)
Daily mean °C (°F)	25.7 (78.3)	26.0 (78.8)	26.1 (79.0)	26.1 (79.0)	26.1 (79.0)	25.8 (78.4)	25.8 (78.4)	25.7 (78.3)	25.5 (77.9)	25.4 (77.7)	25.5 (77.9)	25.6 (78.1)	25.8 (78.4)
Mean daily minimum °C (°F)	22.5 (72.5)	22.7 (72.9)	22.7 (72.9)	22.8 (73.0)	22.7 (72.9)	22.6 (72.7)	22.4 (72.3)	22.5 (72.5)	22.4 (72.3)	22.3 (72.1)	22.5 (72.5)	22.5 (72.5)	22.5 (72.5)
Average precipitation mm (inches)	437.4 (17.22)	341.3 (13.44)	453.4 (17.85)	616.9 (24.29)	727.1 (28.63)	560.3 (22.06)	659.4 (25.96)	705.7 (27.78)	782.5 (30.81)	791.2 (31.15)	729.8 (28.73)	634.6 (24.98)	7,439.6 (292.90)
Average precipitation days	24	21	22	25	28	27	28	28	28	29	25	26	307
Average relative humidity (%)	88	88	88	89	89	90	89	89	89	90	90	89	89
Mean monthly sunshine hours	89.9	79.0	77.5	81.0	80.6	75.0	86.8	83.7	69.0	71.3	75.0	83.7	952.5
Mean daily sunshine hours	2.9	2.8	2.5	2.7	2.6	2.5	2.8	2.7	2.3	2.3	2.5	2.7	2.6
Source: Instituto de Hidrologia Meteorologia y Estudios Ambientales

Climate data for Cabeceras Rio San Juan (Mision La), elevation 5 m (16 ft), (1981–2010)
Month	Jan	Feb	Mar	Apr	May	Jun	Jul	Aug	Sep	Oct	Nov	Dec	Year
Mean daily maximum °C (°F)	29.3 (84.7)	29.9 (85.8)	30.3 (86.5)	30.1 (86.2)	29.8 (85.6)	29.5 (85.1)	29.6 (85.3)	29.5 (85.1)	29.2 (84.6)	28.8 (83.8)	28.4 (83.1)	28.6 (83.5)	29.4 (84.9)
Daily mean °C (°F)	25.6 (78.1)	26.0 (78.8)	26.1 (79.0)	26.1 (79.0)	26.1 (79.0)	25.8 (78.4)	25.8 (78.4)	25.7 (78.3)	25.5 (77.9)	25.3 (77.5)	25.2 (77.4)	25.3 (77.5)	25.7 (78.3)
Mean daily minimum °C (°F)	23.1 (73.6)	23.2 (73.8)	23.4 (74.1)	23.4 (74.1)	23.5 (74.3)	23.2 (73.8)	22.9 (73.2)	23.0 (73.4)	22.9 (73.2)	22.8 (73.0)	22.9 (73.2)	23.0 (73.4)	23.1 (73.6)
Average precipitation mm (inches)	418.1 (16.46)	272.5 (10.73)	337.3 (13.28)	458.0 (18.03)	642.6 (25.30)	612.6 (24.12)	690.0 (27.17)	760.8 (29.95)	819.6 (32.27)	790.0 (31.10)	728.5 (28.68)	675.8 (26.61)	7,205.9 (283.70)
Average precipitation days	24	18	20	23	25	24	27	26	26	25	26	26	288
Average relative humidity (%)	91	89	90	90	91	92	91	91	91	92	92	92	91
Mean monthly sunshine hours	77.5	79.0	83.7	84.0	80.6	75.0	83.7	86.8	66.0	71.3	63.0	68.2	918.8
Mean daily sunshine hours	2.5	2.8	2.7	2.8	2.6	2.5	2.7	2.8	2.2	2.3	2.1	2.2	2.5
Source: Instituto de Hidrologia Meteorologia y Estudios Ambientales
