= Alfredo Fuentes Hernández =

Colombian diplomat, lawyer and economist

Alfredo Fuentes Hernández is a Colombian diplomat, lawyer and economist. He was a partner at Colombian law firm Palacios Lleras. Since October 2015 he is a partner and CEO at the Colombian Law Firm "Fuentes Hernández Asesores SAS".

As the Director General for Legal Affairs, he became the interim Secretary General of the Andean Community of Nations in August 2006, after Allan Wagner Tizón's resignation. He was succeeded by Freddy Ehlers (Ecuador), in January 2007.

Fuentes was previously the executive director of the Cerrejón Foundation for the Institutional Strengthening, a program supported by thermal coal producer and exporter Cerrejon; and dean of the Faculty of Law at the University of the Andes, Colombia.

He is an alumnus of the University of the Andes, Colombia, and earned a Ford Foundation scholarship to attend Harvard University and Boston University.

He was awarded with the National Order of Merit decreed by the President of Ecuador in 2006, and the Order of Merit for Distinguished Services by Supreme Resolution of the President of Peru and the Minister of Foreign Affairs in 2008. He was also preselected by the Council of State in 2012 among the final three candidates for Magistrate of the Constitutional Court of Colombia.
