= Secretary-General of the Andean Community =

Organ of the Andean Community seated in Lima, Peru

Building of the Andean Pact
- Edificio del Pacto Andino
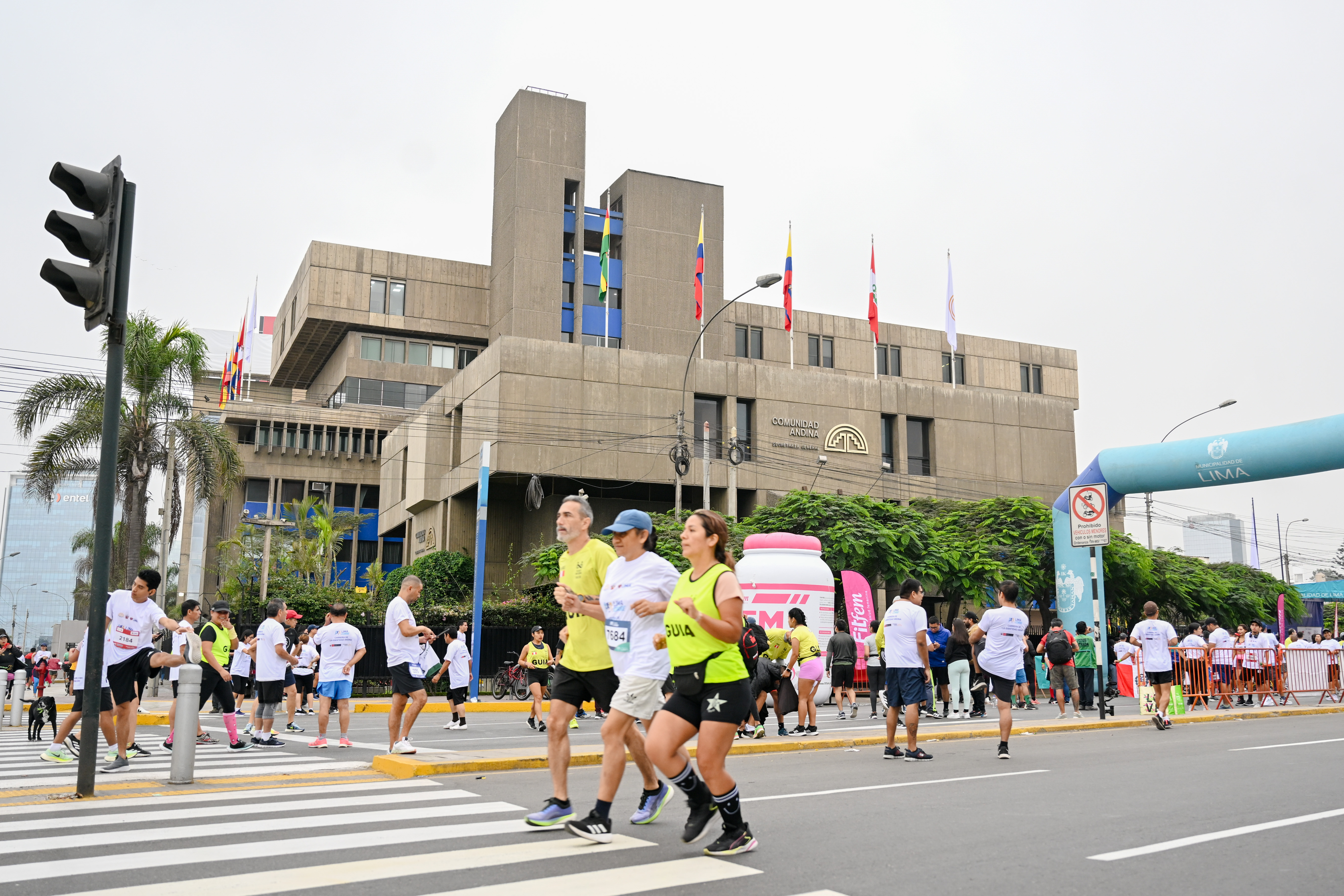
- Headquarters in Lima
- Interactive map of Building of the Andean Pact

General information
- Location: Av. P.º de la República 3895

The Secretary-General of the Andean Community is the chief administrative officer of the executive organ of the Andean Community. Since August 1, 1997, it also assumes the attributions of the Junta of the Cartagena Agreement. The secretary-general is headquartered at the organisation's brutalist-style headquarters of the same name in Lima, Peru, formerly known as the Building of the Andean Pact.

The current officeholder is Gonzalo Gutiérrez Reinel since 2023.

== List of secretaries-general ==
- Sebastián Alegrett (Venezuela) 1997–2002
- Guillermo Fernández de Soto (Colombia) 2002–2004
- Edward Allan Wagner Tizón (Peru) 2004–2006
- Alfredo Fuentes Hernández (Colombia), interim 2006–2007
- Freddy Ehlers (Ecuador), 2007–2010
- Adalid Contreras Baspineiro (Bolivia), interim 2010–2011, 2011–2013
- Pablo Guzmán Laugier (Bolivia), 2013–2016
- Walker San Miguel Rodríguez (Bolivia), 2016–2018
- Luz Marina Monroy Acevedo (Colombia) 2018
- Héctor Quintero Arredondo (Colombia) 2018–2019
- Jorge Pedraza (Colombia) 2019–2023
- Gonzalo Gutiérrez Reinel (Peru) 2023–present

== See also ==
- Andean Community
- Comunidad Andina-Aramburú (Metropolitano)
