= Patricia Caicedo =

Colombian-Spanish soprano and musicologist (born 1969)

- Born: 1969 (age 56–57); Ibague, Colombia
- Occupations: soprano singer; musicologist
- Years active: 1993–present
- Website: patriciacaicedo.com

Patricia Caicedo (born 1969) is a Colombian-Spanish classical soprano, musicologist, physician, author, and scholar whose work focuses on Latin American and Iberian art song and the relationship between music and health. Her work encompasses performance, musicological research, publishing, and the promotion of Latin American and Iberian vocal repertoire in Spanish, Catalan, Portuguese and Indigenous languages.

She is the founder and director of the Barcelona Festival of Song and the founder of Mundoarts. Her publications include The Latin American Art Song: Sounds of the Imagined Nations and We Are What We Listen To: The Impact of Music and Individual and Social Health. She is also the creator and host Resonances: Where Music, Health and Identity Meet and, since 2025 has co-hosted with LA Opera's Spanish-language podcast Detrás del telón.

== Life and career ==
Born in the Colombian city of Ibagué, Caicedo started studying music in her childhood at the Conservatorio de música del Tolima. She began singing in her teens, initially singing folk Latin American music. In 1992, after completing medical studies at the Escuela Colombiana de Medicina, she initiated voice studies at the Conservatorio del Tolima and later in Barcelona and New York. She studied with Rocio Rios, Alfredo Kraus, Maya Maiska, and Gilberto Escobar.

In 1993, she made her professional debut at the International Festival of Classical Music, accompanied by the Tolima Symphony Orchestra. She performed as a soloist in Juan Crisóstomo Arriaga's Stabat Mater and Pergolesi's Stabat Mater and in other recitals. In 1993, she received first prize in the Concurso Nacional del Bambuco competition, and in 1998 she was named best classical soloist in Colombia by Sony Music.

Caicedo specialized in Latin American and Iberian vocal repertoire. In this area she has published several books and CDs and frequently gives master classes, lectures, and recitals in European and American universities. In 2013 she completed a PhD in musicology at the Universidad Complutense de Madrid, her dissertation title is The Latin American Art Song: National Identity, Performance Practice and the Worlds of Art.

Since 2001 Caicedo has maintained a concert and recording career. She has recorded eleven albums dedicated to the Latin American and Iberian Art Song repertoire in Spanish, Catalan and Portuguese. Caicedo has published several books, articles and CDs related to the Latin American, Catalan and Iberian vocal repertoire.

A co-founder of the Latin American Art Song Alliance (LAASA), Caicedo founded Mundo Arts, a company that publishes and distributes Latin American art song.

In 2005, she founded the Barcelona Festival of Song, an annual summer program for classical singers and a concert series dedicated to the study of the history and interpretation of the Latin American and Iberian vocal repertoire. The festival celebrates its twentieth edition in 2024.

Since 2008, Caicedo was included in the Who's Who in America. Since 2010, sha has also been included in the Who's Who in American Women and Who´s Who in the World.

In 2014, she created EYECatalunya, an interactive Internet platform dedicated to internationally promote Catalan creativity.

In 2020 Caicedo was elected as an executive board member of the International Music Council, an organization founded in 1949 by UNESCO. The IMC is the world's largest network of organizations and institutions working in the field of music. It promotes access to music for all and the value of music in the lives of all people.

In 2020 the National Association of Teachers of Singing (NATS) of the United States highlighted Caicedo's contribution to the diversity in vocal performance and research. In the same year, the European Voice Teacher Association invited her as a keynote speaker at EUROVOX the congress of the association.

In 2021, the Embassy of Colombia recognized her as one of the ten outstanding Colombians in Spain.

In 2022 Caicedo was invited as a visiting scholar at the Iberian and Latin American Music Center of the University of California Riverside, where she spent six months. In the same year she presented lectures and masterclasses at Montclair University, George Mason University, CalPoly, New York University, University of North Carolina School of the Arts, University of California Irvine., Texas Christian University the University of Texas Rio Grande She presented a Masterclass of Latin American and Iberian Art Songs at the International Congress of Voice Teachers in Vienna. and a lecture about digital musicology at the Annual Meeting of the American Musicological Society in New Orleans.

In 2023, Caicedo received invitations as an artist and scholar in residence at institutions including Vanderbilt University, the Eastman School of Music, Bucknell University, Texas State University, Montclair University, the Boston Conservatory, Berklee School of Music, Goshen College, the School of Medicine at the University of Rochester, and the University of Toronto, where she held the distinguished title of the 2023 John Stratton Visitor in Music. The John R. Stratton Visitor in Music program brings specialists in voice, opera, and collaborative piano to the Faculty of Music.

In October 2023, Classical Singer Magazine published a feature about Caicedo and her work. In the same year, she served as a keynote speaker at Ritmo Budapest and gave lectures at the University of Vienna and Trinity College of Music.

She is the creator and host of Resonances: Where Music, Health, and Identity Meet, a podcast that reflects her background as a physician, musicologist, and singer. In 2025, she also became co-host of LA Opera’s podcasts Detrás del Telón (Spanish) and Behind the Curtain (English).

Since 1998, Caicedo has lived in Barcelona, Spain, and has double citizenship, Colombian and Spanish.

== Publications ==
Caicedo's publications include:

=== Books ===
- Caicedo, Patricia. Twenty-Four Songs and Arias in Spanish. From the XV to the XXI Centuries: Barcelona: Mundo Arts Publications, 2024.
- Anthology of Latin American and Iberian Art Songs by Women Composers Vol. 2. Barcelona: Mundoarts Publications, 2022.
- We are what we listen to: the impact of music on individual and social health. Barcelona: Mundoarts Publications, 2021.
- Somos lo que escuchamos: impacto de la música en la salud individual y social. Barcelona: Mundoarts Publications, 2021.
- Latin American and Iberian Art Songs by Women Composers. Barcelona: Mundoarts Publications, 2020.
- Spanish Diction for Singers: A Practical Guide for the Pronunciation of the Peninsular and American Spanish. Barcelona: Mundoarts Publications, 2020.
- The Latin American Art Song, Sounds of Imagined Nations. Maryland: Lexington Press, 2018.
- Los sonidos de las naciones imaginadas: la canción artística latinoamericana en el contexto del nacionalismo musical. Barcelona: Mundo Arts Publications y Fundación Autor, 2018.
- The Argentinian Art Song: Irma Urteaga, Complete Songs for Voice and Piano, Barcelona: Mundoarts Publications, 2017.
- The Latin American Art Song: Critical Anthology and Interpretive Guide for Singers. Barcelona: Tritó, 2005
- The Colombian Art Song: Jaime León, analysis and compilation of his works for voice and piano. New York: Mundo Arts Publications, 2009.
- The Bolivian Art Song: Alquimia, Song Cycle by Agustín Fernández. Barcelona: Mundo Arts Publications, New York, MA003, 2012.
- El Barcelona Festival of Song: construyendo una narrativa para la canción Ibérica y latinoamericana. Barcelona: Mundo Arts Publications, MA004, 2014.

=== Articles ===
Caicedo has published articles on various subjects, including:

- Caicedo, Patricia. “Water, Mirrors, and Bridges: Exploring Women’s Multifaceted Role in the Latin American and Iberian Art Song Ecosystem. VoicePrints, Journal of the New York Voice Teachers’ Association. Volume 22, Number 3, January--February 2025.
- Caicedo, Patricia. “Memory, Nostalgia and Resistance: The Afro-Latin Art Song.” Diagonal: An Ibero-American Music Review Vol. 9, issue. 2 (2024).
- Caicedo, Patricia. “Mujeres-agua, mujeres-espejo y mujeres-puente en la creación y promoción de la canción artística latinoamericana e ibérica.” Diagonal: An Ibero American Music Review Vol. 8, issue. 2 (2023): 47-66.
- Caicedo, Patricia (2021). "Deconstructing the Center and the Peripheries: A Proposal for a 4E Performance Practice of the Latin American Art Song". Journal of Singing. 77 (4). Jacksonville: 501–507. ProQuest 2499085622.
- Caicedo, Patricia (24 March 2020). "New Ways of Making Music and Being a Musician in the Digital Era". Diagonal: An Ibero-American Music Review. 5 (2). doi:10.5070/D85247762.
- Decolonizing Classical Singers’ Minds: The Latin American and Iberian Art Song Repertoire, Australian Voice, Volume 20, 2019
- Deconstructing the center and the peripheries: a proposal for a 4E performance practice of the Latin American art song. ICREA Colloquium. (Barcelona: February, 2019).
- Caicedo, Patricia, "Marcel Duchamp y la performance practice de la canción artística latinoamericana" in Música y construcción de identidades: poéticas, diálogos y utopías en Latinoamérica y España, Rodriguez, Victoria Ed. 1-25. Madrid, Sociedad Española de Musicología, 2018.
- "Marcel Duchamp y la performance practice de la canción artística latinoamericana in Música e identidades en Latinoamérica y España. Procesos, ideológicos, estéticos y creativos en el siglo XX". Universidad Complutense de Madrid.
- "Lo real, lo virtual y el interespacio: nuevas formas de ser músico y hacer música en la era digital", Actas del congreso MUCA, Universidad de Murcia, 2015.
- "The Latin-American Art Song Repertoire" in Singing. Voice of the Association of Teachers of Singing. AOTOS, UK. Spring, 2013.
- "Discovering Latin-American Art Song Through Song and Poetry’ in VoicePrints, Vol. 9 Jan-Feb, 2012.
- Caicedo, Patricia (2012). "A Guide to the Latin American Art Song Repertoire: An Annotated Catalog of Twentieth-Century Art Songs for Voice and Piano (review)". Latin American Music Review. 33 (1): 144–147. doi:10.1353/lat.2012.0007. S2CID 190997920.
- "Agua, espejo y puente: El papel de la mujer en la creación, desarrollo y difusión de la canción artística latinoamericana" in Papeles de Cadiz, Universidad de Cádiz, 2006.
- "La canción artística en América Latina: formas clásicas de vender fresas en las calles". ILAASA, University of Texas at Austin, 2003.
- "Giaccomo Puccini: El hombre detrás del artista in Amadeus, No.87, Barcelona, 2000.
- "Carmen: una mujer de hoy" in Amadeus No.83, RBA revistas, Barcelona, 2000.'
- "El lied Latinoamericano: hacia un redescubrimiento musical de América" in Amadeus No.78, RBA Revistas, Barcelona, 1999.

== Recordings ==
Caicedo's recordings include:

- Nuestros dias: poemas de amor hechos canción. Barcelona: Mundo Arts Records, 2021.
- Signat l´amic del cor. Barcelona: Mundo Arts Records, 2020.
- Más que nunca: Colombian Art Songs by Jaime León. Barcelona: Mundo Arts Records & Fundación Autor, 2019
- Miraba la noche el alma: Art Songs by Latin American & Catalan Composers. Barcelona: Mundo Arts Records, 2016.
- Amb veu de dona: Catalan Art Songs by Women Composers. Barcelona: Mundo Arts Records, 2016.
- De Catalunya vinc… Catalan Art Songs of the XX & XXI Centuries. Barcelona: Mundo Arts Records, 2015.
- Jaime Leon: Aves y Ensueños (Colombian Art Songs), 2011. Label: Mundo Arts Records
- Estrela É Lúa Nova – un Viaje por América Latina y España (A journey through Latin-America & Spain'), 2011. Label: Mundo Arts Records
- De Mi Corazón Latino- Latin Songs of all times, 2010. Label: Mundo Arts Records
- A mi ciudad nativa – Art Songs of Latin America Vol. 2, 2005. Label: Mundo Arts Records
- Lied: Art Songs of Latin America, 2001. Label: Edicions Albert Moraleda

== Awards, grants and recognition ==
- Premio Brasil Ibermúsicas given to the Barcelona Festival of Song. December, 2022
- Book Publication award given by Fundación Autor for the book Somos lo que escuchamos, impacto de la música en la salud individual y social. 2021.
- 10 colombianos destacados en España. Given by the Colombian Embassy in Spain. December, 2021
- BCC Award for Arts and Culture. December, 2021
- Featured on the National Association of Teachers of Singing (NATS).
- Book Publication award given by Fundación Autor for the book Somos lo que escuchamos, impacto de la música en la salud individual y social, 2022.
- Artist Internationalization Grant – CatalanArts, 2021.
- Elected as a Board Member of the International Music Council. Served from 2020 to December 2021.
- Composition Grant given by Fundación Autor. Ayudas a la composición de músicas populares given by Fundación Autor – SGAE. 2020.
- CD Publication award given by Fundación Autor for the CD Signat l´amic del cor, 2019.
- Book Publication award given by Fundación Autor for the book Los sonidos de las naciones imaginadas, 2017.
- Named Honorary Member of the Brazilian Voice Teacher Association. (ABCanto). 2017.
- CD Recording and Publication grant. Grant “Enregistraments Especial interés cultural i patrimonial” for the CD of Catalan Art Songs by Women Composers. Given by the Department de Cultura de la Generalitat de Catalunya for heritage preservation. 2016.
- CD Recording and Publication grant. Grant “Enregistraments Especial interés cultural i patrimonial” for the recording of the CD De Catalunya Vinc. Given by the Department de Cultura de la Generalitat de Catalunya for heritage preservation. 2015.
- Included in Who’s Who in America. 2008.
- Included in Who´s Who in American Women. 2009
- Scholarship to attend the congress: Autoras y Actrices en la historia del Teatro Español. Palacio de Valparaíso. Almagro, Spain. June 18–20, 1999.
- First Prize in the Classical Music category.SONY le canta a Colombia Music competition. Bogotá, Colombia, 1998.
- Mención de honor XVIII Festival Folclórico Nacional. Instituto Huílense de Cultura. Neiva, Huila, 1997.
- First Prize as a Vocal Soloist. Concurso Nacional del Bambuco. Pereira, Colombia. 1993.
- First Prize as a Vocal Soloist. Concurso de Interpretación de Música Andina Colombiana Colono de Oro. Florencia, Colombia, 1993.
- First Prize Composition and Interpretation. Concurso Nacional de la Canción Cristiana. Bogotá, Colombia. 1986.
