= Common Fund for Commodities =

Intergovernmental financial institution

- Logo of the Common Fund for Commodities
- Abbreviation: CFC
- Formation: 19 June 1989 (36 years ago)
- Type: Intergovernmental organization
- Purpose: Financial institution
- Headquarters: Amsterdam, Netherlands
- Coordinates: 52.3734016°N 4.9331836°E
- Region served: International
- Members: 101 Member States plus 9 institutional members
- Managing Director: Bangladesh Sheikh Mohammed Belal
- Website: common-fund.org

The Common Fund for Commodities (CFC) is an intergovernmental financial institution established within the framework of the United Nations. It is a vestige of the proposed New International Economic Order. The CFC finances commodity development projects in developing states.

The CFC was established in 1989. It was set up by a 1980 multilateral treaty known as the Agreement establishing the Common Fund for Commodities. As of June 2017, there are 110 parties to the Agreement and thus to the CFC. This total includes 101 UN member states plus 9 intergovernmental organizations: the Andean Community, the African Union, the Caribbean Community, the Common Market for Eastern and Southern Africa, the East African Community, the European Union, the Economic Community of West African States, the Southern African Development Community and the West African Economic and Monetary Union. Members that have joined but then withdrawn from the CFC include Australia, Austria, Belgium, Canada, Japan, Luxembourg, New Zealand, Turkey, and the Eurasian Economic Community. The United States of America has not been a member of the fund.
