= Rodrigo Hernán Lloreda Caicedo =

Colombian lawyer and politician

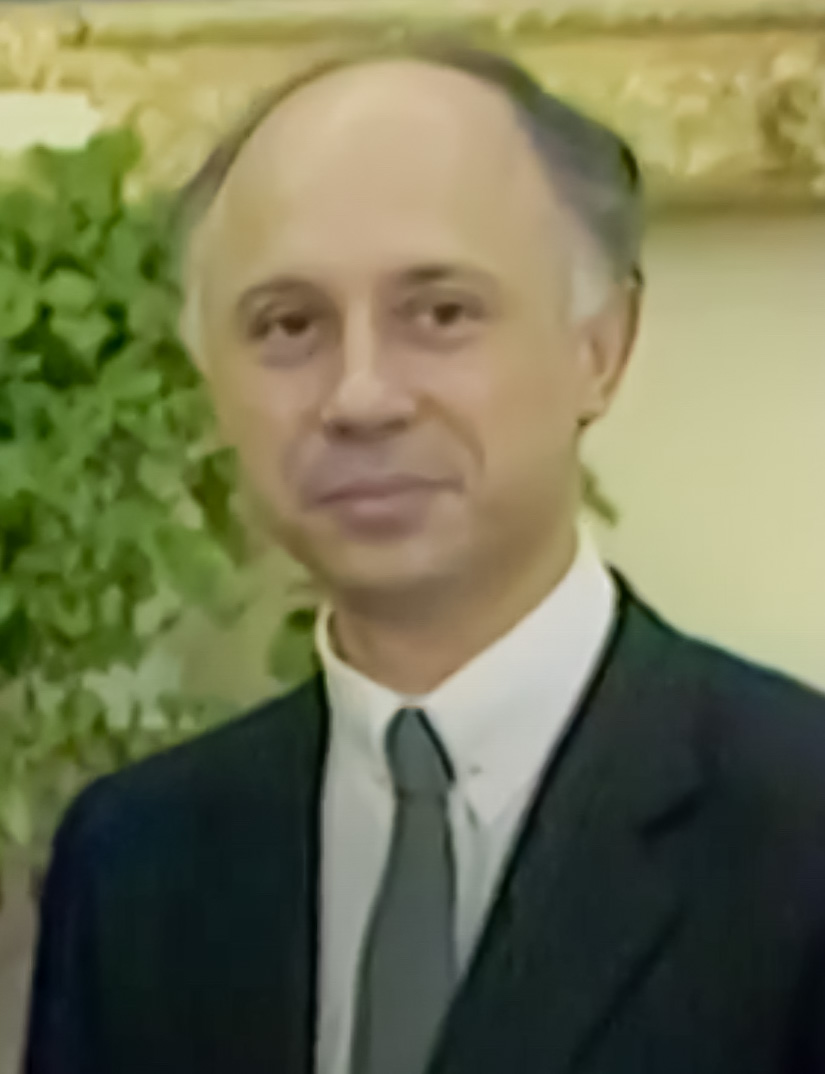
- Lloreda in 1985

Minister of National Defence
- In office 7 August 1998 – 30 May 1999
- President: Andrés Pastrana
- Preceded by: Gilberto Echeverri Mejía
- Succeeded by: Luis Fernando Remirez

22nd Colombia Ambassador to the United States
- In office 15 January 1986 – 11 March 1986
- President: Belisario Betancur
- Preceded by: Álvaro Gómez Hurtado
- Succeeded by: Francisco Posada de La Peña

Minister of Foreign Affairs
- In office 7 August 1982 – 5 July 1984
- President: Belisario Betancur
- Preceded by: Carlos Lemos Simmonds
- Succeeded by: Augusto Ramírez Ocampo

Minister of National Education
- In office 7 August 1978 – 14 May 1980
- President: Julio César Turbay
- Preceded by: Rafael Rivas Posada
- Succeeded by: Guillermo Angulo Gómez

51st Governor of Valle del Cauca
- In office 16 September 1968 – 18 August 1970
- Appointed by: Carlos Lleras Restrepo
- Preceded by: Libardo lozano Guerrero
- Succeeded by: Marino Réngifo Salcedo

Personal details
- Born: Rodrigo Hernán Lloreda Caicedo; 2 September 1942 Cali, Cauca Valley, Colombia
- Died: 4 February 2000 (aged 57) Cali, Cauca Valley, Colombia
- Party: Conservative
- Spouse(s): Aura Lucía Mera Becerra (1964-1971; divorce); María Eugenia Piedrahíta Plata (1974-2000; his death)
- Children: Rodrigo Lloreda Mera; Francisco José Lloreda Mera; María Mercedes Lloreda Mera; Aura Lucía Lloreda Mera; María Eugenia Lloreda Piedrahíta
- Education: Pontifical Xavierian University (LLB, 1965)
- Profession: Lawyer

Rodrigo Hernán Lloreda Caicedo (2 September 1942 — 4 February 2000) was a Colombian lawyer and politician who was appointed to several senior positions under different presidents, with both domestic and foreign affairs responsibilities, beginning in 1968 as appointed governor of his department and briefly as ambassador to the United States. In his last post, Lloreda was the 17th Minister of National Defence, serving under President Andrés Pastrana Arango from 1998 to 1999.

== Early life and education ==
Born on 2 September 1942 in Santiago de Cali, Valle del Cauca, Rodrigo Hernán was the youngest of three children of Álvaro Lloreda Caicedo, a wealthy Colombian industrialist and politician, who in 1949 founded the newspaper El Pais (Cali), which he directed for 25 years. His mother was Mercedes Caicedo Ortiz, from Costa Rica.

His family's political and economic status meant that Lloreda received a privileged education. After attending the Colegio Berchmans in Cali, he completed most of his primary and secondary studies abroad, first in Switzerland at the École nouvelle de la Suisse romande; then in the United States at the Nyack School for Boys in Nyack, New York; and the Georgetown Preparatory School in Rockville, Maryland. He returned to Colombia after his graduation and was accepted to the Pontifical Xavierian University, where he graduated in 1965 with a Bachelor of Laws.

== Career ==
Lloreda became active in the Conservative party, in which his family had held offices for two generations. In 1968 at the age of 26, he was appointed to a four-year term by the President of Colombia as the 51st Governor of Valle del Cauca, his home province. (Since 1991, governors have been elected by popular vote.)

He also served in other appointed positions: as the 22nd Permanent Representative of Colombia to the United Nations, Ambassador to the United States (1986), the 63rd Minister of National Education, and as Minister of Foreign Affairs of Colombia. In his last position, he was appointed as the 17th Minister of National Defence, serving under President Andrés Pastrana Arango from 1998 to 1999. Lloreda died of cancer in February 2000.

== Marriage and family ==
Lloreda met Aura Lucía Mera Becerra while he was attending the Pontifical Xavierian University, and they married on 5 December 1964 in Bogotá. Together they had four children: twin boys, Rodrigo and Francisco José; María Mercedes, and Aura Lucía. The couple divorced in 1971.

On 12 October 1974 Lloreda married again, to the folk singer María Eugenia Piedrahíta Plata. They have a daughter, María Eugenia.
