= Andean Community =

South American international organization

Coordinates: 12°2′S 77°1′W

Andean Community Comunidad Andina (Spanish)
- Flag
- Motto: "Ésta es mi tierra, ésta es mi casa" (Spanish) "This is my land, this is my home"
- Seat of Secretariat: Lima, Peru
- Largest city: Lima, Peru
- Official languages: Spanish^{a}; Quechua; Aymara; and 34 other indigenous languages
- Type: Trade bloc
- Member states: 4 full members; 5 associates; 4 observers

Leaders
  - Secretary General: Gonzalo Gutierrez Reinel

Establishment
  - as the Andean Pact: 1969
  - as the CAN: 1996

Area
  - Total: 3,781,914 km^{2} (1,460,205 sq mi) (7th)

Population
  - 2010 estimate: 101,119,783^{b} (12th)
- GDP (PPP): 2017 estimate
  - Total: $902.86 billion (9th)
  - Per capita: $8,928.62
- HDI (2017): 0.781 high
- Website http://www.comunidadandina.org/
- 1. Also the Community's working language.; 2. Combined member states' census estimates.

The Andean Community (Spanish: Comunidad Andina de Naciones, CAN) is an international organization in South America. It consists of the member states Bolivia, Colombia, Ecuador, and Peru and aims at the economic, political and social integration of these states.

CAN is also a free trade area with the objective of creating a customs union comprising the South American countries. The organization was called the Andean Pact (Pacto Andino) until 1996 and came into existence when the Cartagena Agreement was signed in 1969. Since the reform by the Trujillo Protocol of 1997 it called Comunidad Andina de Naciones. Its headquarters are in Lima, Peru.

The Andean Community has 113 million inhabitants over an area of approximately 3,800,000 km^{2}. Its GDP has gone up to US$745.300 billion in 2005, including Venezuela, which was a member at the time. Its estimated PPP of GDP for 2011 amounts to US$902.86 billion, excluding Venezuela.

The supranational characteristics of CAN are the reason why the Andean Community is considered the most robust subregional organization in Latin America and the Caribbean.

== Cartagena Agreement of 1969 ==
The Cartagena Agreement of 26 May 1969 is the legal basis of the Andean legal order, a supranational legal order modeled on European Community law.

Although characterized by greater intergovernmentalism, the Andean Community is clearly modeled on the European Union in its basic elements. The Community is empowered to adopt its own legal acts, which are directly applicable in the member states and can grant individual rights without the need for further ratification. Furthermore, Andean Community law takes precedence over national law. These supranational characteristics of the Community are the reason why the Andean Community is considered the most robust subregional organization in Latin America and the Caribbean.

The Member States drafted a treaty establishing the Andean Court of Justice (AGHV), which in its legal effects is partly similar to an additional protocol to the AC.

== History ==
Member states

The original Andean Pact was founded in 1969 by Bolivia, Chile, Colombia, Ecuador, and Peru. In 1973 the pact gained its sixth member, Venezuela. In 1976 however, its membership was again reduced to five when Chile withdrew. Venezuela announced its withdrawal in 2006, reducing the Andean Community to four member states.

With the new cooperation agreement with Mercosur, the Andean Community gained four new associate members: Argentina, Brazil, Paraguay, and Uruguay. These four Mercosur members were granted associate membership by the Andean Council of Foreign Ministers meeting in an enlarged session with the Commission (of the Andean Community) on 7 July 2005. This moves reciprocates the actions of Mercosur which granted associate membership to all the Andean Community nations by virtue of the Economic Complementarity Agreements (Free Trade agreements) signed between the CAN and individual Mercosur members.

Evgeny Morozov argues that the original Andean Pact was motivated in part by a pursuit of technological sovereignty and independence from partnerships with American technology companies.

== Chronology ==
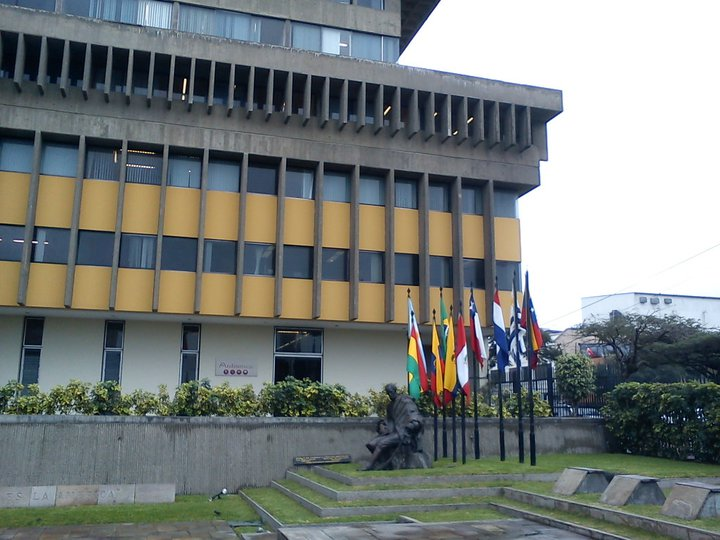
Secretariat of the Andean Community in Lima

- The groundwork for the Community was established in 1969 in the Cartagena Agreement, signed May 26.
- In 1973, Venezuela joined the Andean Pact.
- In 1976, Augusto Pinochet withdrew Chile from the Andean Pact claiming economic incompatibilities.
- In 1979, the treaty creating the Court of Justice was signed. The Andean Parliament located in principle in Lima, and the Andean Council of Foreign Ministers were created.
- In 1981 the Andean Parliament moved to Bogotá.
- In 1983, the treaty creating the Court of Justice entered into effect.
- In 1991, the presidents approved the open skies policy and agreed to intensify integration.
- In 1992, Peru temporarily suspended its obligations under the Liberalization Program.
- In 1993, the Free Trade Zone entered into full operation for Bolivia, Colombia, Ecuador, and Venezuela.
- In 1994, the Common External Tariff was approved.
- In 1996, the Cartagena Agreement Commission approved the regulatory context for the establishment, operation, and exploitation of the Simón Bolívar Satellite System.
- In March 1996, through the Trujillo Protocol, institutional reforms were introduced: The Andean Community was created and the Andean Integration System was established.
- In 1997, an agreement was reached for Peru's gradual incorporation into the Andean Free Trade Zone.
- In 1998, the Framework Agreement for the creation of a Free Trade Area between the Andean Community and the Mercosur was signed in Buenos Aires.
- In 2000, at a meeting of the presidents of South America, the heads of state of the Andean Community and Mercosur decided to launch negotiations for establishing a free trade area between the two blocs as rapidly as possible, and by January 2002 at the latest.
- In August 2003, the Andean Community and Mercosur Foreign Ministers, during a meeting in Montevideo at which the CAN delivered a working proposal containing guidelines for the negotiation, reaffirmed their governments' political determination to move ahead with the negotiation of a free trade agreement between the two blocs.
- In April 2006 President Hugo Chávez announced that Venezuela would withdraw from the Andean Community, claiming the FTA agreements signed by Colombia and Peru with the United States caused irreparable damage to the community.
- On 23 March 2017, a Memorandum of Understanding was signed between the Andean Community and the Eurasian Economic Union.
- On 21 February 2020, disputed interim president of Venezuela Juan Guaidó announced Venezuela's reentry into CAN.
- The trade agreement between the European Union and the Andean countries of Colombia, Peru, and Ecuador entered into full force in 2024. The agreement covers the areas of services, intellectual property, and public procurement.

== Membership ==
- Current full member states:
  - Bolivia (1969)
  - Colombia (1969)
  - Ecuador (1969)
  - Peru (1969)
- Associate member states:
  - Argentina (2005)
  - Brazil (2005)
  - Paraguay (2005)
  - Uruguay (2005)
  - Chile (2006)
- Observer states:
  - China
  - Dominican Republic
  - Greece
  - Morocco
  - Panama
  - Spain
  - Turkey
- Former full member states:
  - Chile (full member state 1969–1976, observer state 1976–2006, associate member state since 2006)
  - Venezuela (1973–2006), joined Mercosur

== Relationship with other organizations ==
A clickable Euler diagram showing the relationships between various multinational organizations in the Americas

The Andean Community and Mercosur comprise the two main trading blocs of South America. In 1999, these organizations began negotiating a merger with a view to creating a "South American Free Trade Area" (SAFTA). On 8 December 2004, the Andean Community (CAN) signed a cooperation agreement with Mercosur and they published a joint letter of intention for future negotiations towards integrating all of South America in a Union of South American Nations (USAN), patterned after the European Union.

During 2005, Venezuela decided to join Mercosur. Venezuela's official position first appeared to be that, by joining Mercosur, further steps could be taken towards integrating both trade blocs. CAN Secretary General Allan Wagner stated that the Venezuelan Foreign Minister Alí Rodríguez had declared that Venezuela did not intend to leave the CAN, and its simultaneous membership to both blocs marked the beginning of their integration.

However some analysts interpreted that Venezuela might eventually leave the CAN in the process. As Colombia and Peru signed free trade agreements with the United States, in protest the Venezuelan President Hugo Chávez indeed announced in April 2006 his country's withdrawal from the CAN, stating that the Community is "dead". Officials in Colombia and Peru expressed their disagreement with this view, as did representatives from Venezuela's industrial sector (Conindustria).

In spite of this announcement, Venezuela still had not formally completed all the necessary withdrawal procedures. According to Venezuela's Commerce Minister María Cristina Iglesias, the entire process was going to take up five years. Until then, Venezuela and its partners would remain bound by the effects of the community's preexisting commercial agreements.

Exclusive Economic Zones of the member states of the Andean Community. Considering them, the total area of the Andean Community is 6 573 757 km^{2}.

During a visit to Colombia in August 2007, President Hugo Chávez was asked by the presidents of Ecuador and Bolivia to rejoin the Andean Community, and he responded that he would agree. Meanwhile, at that time the Mercosur's relations with Venezuela were weakening as Mercosur was not agreeing with some of the Hugo Chávez's proposals.

Eventually Venezuela achieved the full membership of the Mercosur in 2012, making the Mercosur bigger in number of members than the CAN for the first time.

In addition to CAN, Bolivia is also a member of the WTO, UNASUR, and ALBA. Its attitude is considered crucial to relations between UNASUR and ALBA specifically, says Marion Hörmann, since Bolivia is traditionally seen as a mediator between the Andean countries and the rest of South America.

Furthermore, on 7 December 2012, the Bolivian nation was accepted by the Mercosur countries to start the incorporation protocols to achieve the Mercosur full membership in a matter of 4 years, receiving the proclamation of an accessing member, and further consolidating itself as a strategic geopolitical nation.

== Organization ==
- Andean Presidential Council
- Andean Foreign Relations Ministers Council (Lima, Peru)
- Commission (Lima, Peru)
- Headquarters (Lima, Peru)
- Andean Court of Justice (Quito, Ecuador)
- Andean Parliament (Bogotá, Colombia)
- Latin American Reserve Fund (Bogotá, Colombia and Lima, Peru)
- Simón Bolívar Andean University (Sucre, Bolivia and Quito, Ecuador)
- Andean Health Organization (Lima, Peru)
- CAF – Development Bank of Latin America and the Caribbean (Caracas, Venezuela)

== Secretaries-General ==
- Sebastián Alegrett (Venezuela) 1997–2002
- Guillermo Fernández de Soto (Colombia) 2002–2004
- Edward Allan Wagner Tizón (Peru) 2004–2006
- Alfredo Fuentes Hernández (Colombia), interim 2006–2007
- Freddy Ehlers (Ecuador), 2007–2010
- Adalid Contreras Baspineiro (Bolivia), interim 2010–2011, 2011–2013
- Pablo Guzmán Laugier (Bolivia), 2013–2016
- Walker San Miguel (Bolivia), 2016–present

== Free flow of people ==
Since 1 January 2005, the citizens of the member countries can enter the other Andean Community member states without the requirement of a visa. Travellers should present the authorities their national ID cards.

Visitors to Venezuela will have to present their passports; they will then receive the Andean Migration Card (Tarjeta Andina de Migración), in which the time of temporary residence in the country is stated.

=== Andean passport ===
The Andean passport was created in June 2001 pursuant to Decisión 504. This stipulates the issuing of a passport based on a standard model which contains harmonised features of nomenclature and security. The passport is effective in Ecuador, Peru, Venezuela and Bolivia (Bolivia since early 2006).

== Literature ==
- Sánchez, M.J., 2025. Andean Community (CAN). In The Economics of Regional Integration (pp. 223–248). Routledge.

== See also ==
- Central American Common Market
- Community of Latin American and Caribbean States
- Free Trade Area of the Americas
- Federation of the Andes
- Union of South American Nations
- Rules of Origin
- Market access
- Free-trade area
- Tariffs
