= Guillermo Fernández de Soto =

Colombian lawyer and diplomat

Guillermo Fernández de Soto Valderrama
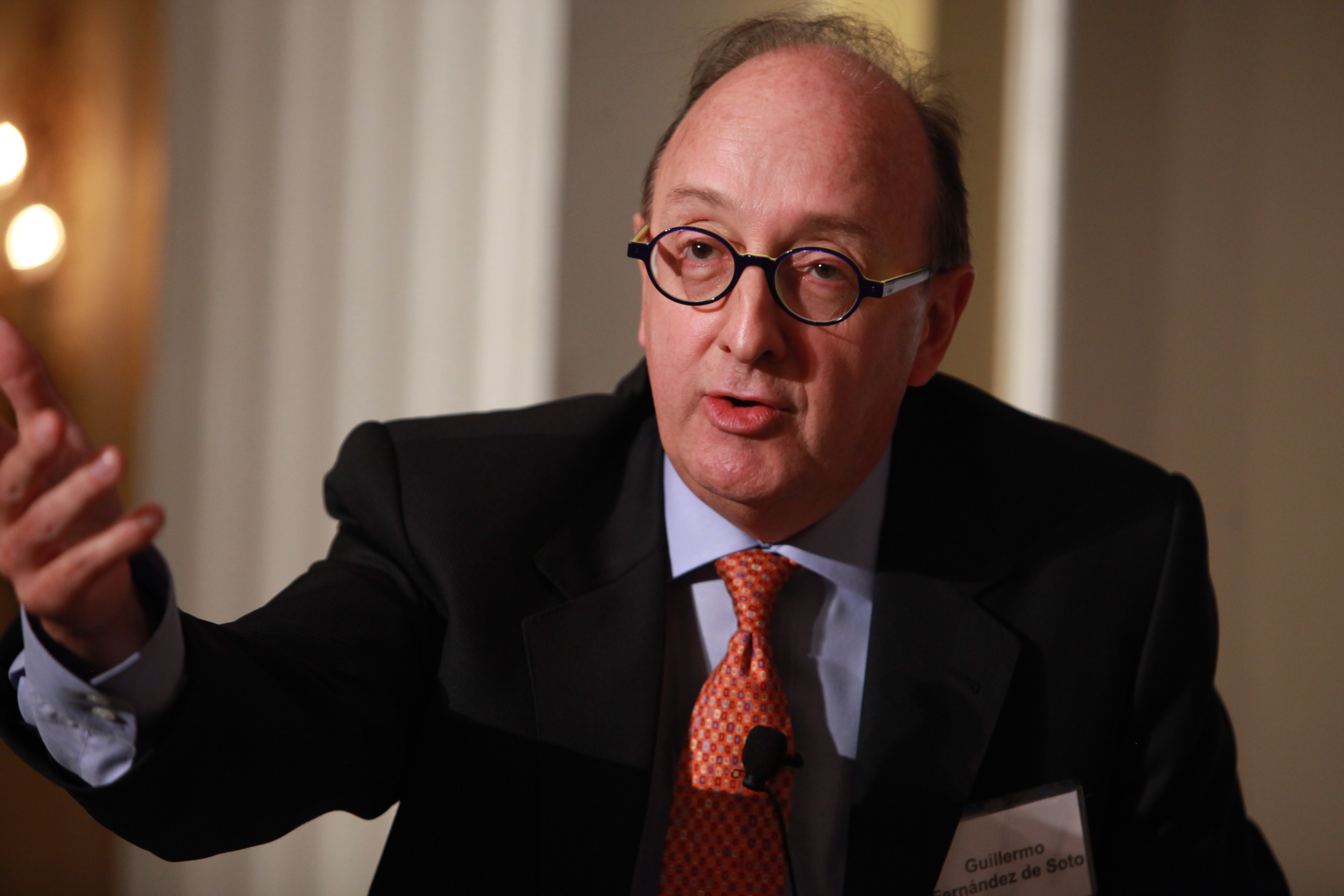

Permanent Representative of Colombia to the United Nations
- In office 13 October 2018 – 7 August 2022
- Preceded by: María Emma Mejía Vélez
- Succeeded by: Leonor Zalabata Torres

Secretary General of the Andean Community of Nations
- In office 7 July 2002 – 15 January 2004
- Preceded by: Sebastián Alegrett
- Succeeded by: Edward Allan Wagner Tizón

Colombian Minister of Foreign Affairs
- In office 7 August 1998 – 7 August 2002
- President: Andrés Pastrana Arango
- Preceded by: Camilo Reyes Rodríguez
- Succeeded by: Carolina Barco Isakson

Minister of National Education of Colombia
- In office July 1995 – July 1996
- President: Ernesto Samper Pizano
- Preceded by: Arturo Sarabia Bette
- Succeeded by: Olga Duque de Ospina

Colombia Ambassador to The Netherlands
- President: Álvaro Uribe Vélez
- Preceded by: Vladimiro Naranjo Mesa
- Succeeded by: Francisco José Lloreda Mera

Personal details
- Born: 27 September 1953 (age 73) Bogotá, D.C., Colombia
- Spouse(s): María Consuelo Camacho Quintero (widowed); Alexandra Kling Mazuera (1999-divorced)
- Children: Ana María Fernández de Soto Camacho; Camilo Fernández de Soto Camacho; Nicolás Fernández de Soto Camacho; Juan Fernández de Soto Kling
- Education: Pontifical Xavierian University (PhD)
- Profession: Lawyer

Guillermo John Roque Fernández de Soto Valderrama (born 27 September 1953) is a Colombian lawyer and diplomat, who has served as Secretary General of the Andean Community of Nations, Minister of Foreign Affairs of Colombia, Ambassador of Colombia to the Kingdom of the Netherlands, and designated-Ambassador Extraordinary and Plenipotenciary, Permanent Representative of Colombia to the United Nations in New York.

== Biography ==
Ambassador Fernandez de Soto holds a degree in law and economic sciences from Pontificia Universidad Javeriana and a Postgraduate degree in Socio-Economic Sciences from the same institution. He has had extensive experience in the field of international relations, Colombian diplomacy, academia, and in the professional practice in civil, commercial and international law.

== Career ==
Early in his career, he worked as a Senior Specialist of the Organization of American States (OAS) Inter American Commission on Human Rights in Washington DC. He also served as Vice Minister of Foreign Affairs of Colombia (1985–1986) He worked in the Secretariat of the United Nations for the Commission of Truth in the peace process of El Salvador. Also, he worked for the United Nations Development Program (UNDP) for the preparation of the Special Economic Cooperation Plan for Central America.

In the commercial field, he was the President of the Chamber of Commerce of Bogotá (CCB) and held other positions such as President of the Ibero-American Association of Chambers of Commerce (AICO), General Director of the Inter-American Commercial Arbitration Commission, President of the Colombian Committee of the International Chamber of Commerce in Paris (ICC), President of the Colombian Committee of the Economic Council of the Pacific Basin (PBEC).

As well, he served as Member and Executive Secretary of the presidential Commission for the Colombo-Venezuelan border integration body 1988–1998.

He served as Minister of Foreign Affairs of Colombia from 1998 to 2002, a period during which he was also President of the Andean Council of Foreign Ministers and President of the United Nations Security Council (August, 2001). Later, he was Secretary General of the Andean Community until 2004.

He also served as Ambassador of Colombia to the Kingdom of the Netherlands (2004–2008), Permanent Representative of Colombia to the Organization for the Prohibition of Chemical Weapons (OPCW), Vice-President of the Tenth Conference of States Parties to the OPCW. In addition, he was the Representative of Colombia before the Administrative Council of the Permanent Court of Arbitration and Representative of Colombia before the Common Fund for Commodities.

Ambassador Fernández de Soto served as International Arbitrator in various disputes from Commercial and Administrative Law matters. He was also Co-agent before the International Court of Justice in the case of Aerial Spraying (Ecuador v. Colombia) and in the case of the Territorialand Maritime Dispute (Nicaragua v. Colombia). He was a member of the Inter-American Judicial Committee of the OAS and its president in 2011–2012.

He was also President of the Colombian Council of International Relations (CORI). Most recently, he served as Corporate Director for Europe at CAF, the Development Bank of Latin America based in Madrid, Spain (2012–2018).

In the Academy, he served as the Dean of the Faculty of International Relations of the Universidad Jorge Tadeo Lozano in Bogotá, Executive Director of the International Studies Center “Interamerican Forum”. He has also participated in several academic publications as author and editor, and his articles have been published in several newspapers and magazines in Colombia.

== Ambassador to the United Nations ==
He was appointed in September 2018 by the President of the Republic of Colombia as Ambassador to the United Nations. In 2019 he assumed the Presidency of the United Nations Peacebuilding Commission. The Peacebuilding Support Office was established in 2005 as an advisory body to Member States and its role is to contribute to the maintenance of peace through international support for peacebuilding initiatives in different areas and regions of the world.

During his presidency, Fernandez de Soto visited Sierrea Leona, Loberia, Côte d'Ivoire and the African Union where he was able to witness the Commission's progress in peacebuilding. In January 2020 he handed over the presidency to the government of Canada while Colombia continues as vice president.

== Decorations ==
- National Order of Merit (Grand Officer) – France
- Order of José Cecilio del Valle (Grand Cross) – Honduras
- Order of Francisco de Miranda (First Class) – Venezuela
- Order of the Liberator (Grand Cordon) – Venezuela
- Order of the Liberator General San Martin (Grand Cross) – Argentina
- Order of Bernardo O'Higgins (Grand Cross) – Chile
- Order of the Merit of Chile (Grand Cross) – Chile
- Order of the Sun (Grand Cross) – Peru
- Order of Isabella the Catholic (Grand Cross) – Spain
- Order of Simón Bolívar (Grand Cross) – Bolivia
- Order of Honorato Vásquez (Grand Cross) –Ecuador
- Order of the Aztec Eagle (Grand Band) – Mexico
- Order of Boyacá (Grand Cross) – Colombia
- Order of Vasco Núñez de Balboa (Grand Cross) – Panama
- Order of Orange-Nassau (Grand Cross) – Netherlands
