= Diego Morejón =

Ecuadorian politician

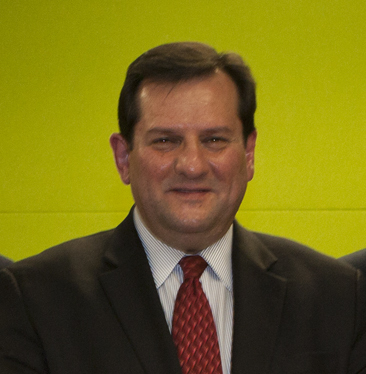
Diego Morejón

Diego Morejón is the former Permanent Representative of Ecuador to the United Nations, a position he served from September 2008 to February 2014.
