= El País (Cali) =

Colombian newspaper

- Front page of El País, 24 October 2012
- Type: Daily newspaper
- Format: Broadsheet
- Founder(s): Álvaro Lloreda Caicedo
- Publisher: Diario El Pais S.A.
- Editor-in-chief: Victoria Eugenia Perea
- News editor: Diego Martínez Lloreda
- Opinion editor: Luis Guillermo Restrepo Satizabal
- Founded: 23 April 1950
- Political alignment: Conservatism
- Language: Spanish
- Headquarters: Carrera 2 # 24-46; Cali, Valle del Cauca, Colombia
- Circulation: 69,610 Daily; 185,854 Sunday
- ISSN: 0124-891X
- Website: www.elpais.com.co

El País (English: The Country) is a regional daily newspaper based in Cali, Colombia, and leading newspaper of the Colombian Pacific Region. El País is a member of the Latin American Newspaper Association.
