= Álvaro Lloreda Caicedo =

Colombian politician and newspaper executive

Colombia Ambassador to Spain
- In office 7 February 1974 – January 1975
- President: Alfonso López Michelsen
- Preceded by: Carlos Augusto Noriega
- Succeeded by: Belisario Betancur Cuartas

Member of the Senate of Colombia
- In office 1966–1970

Member of the National Constituent Assembly of Colombia
- In office 1954–1957

Member of the Chamber of Representatives of Colombia
- In office 1951–1954
- Constituency: Valle del Cauca Department

Mayor of Cali
- In office August 1946 – January 1948
- Preceded by: Guillermo A Lemus Guzmán
- Succeeded by: José Castro Borrero

Personal details
- Born: 15 October 1903 Santiago de Cali, Valle del Cauca, Colombia
- Died: 10 April 1985 (aged 81) Santiago de Cali, Valle del Cauca, Colombia
- Party: Conservative
- Spouse(s): Mercedes Caicedo Ortiz (c 1938-1985; his death)
- Children: Elvira Lloreda Caicedo; Álvaro José Lloreda Caicedo; Rodrigo Hernán Lloreda Caicedo

Álvaro Lloreda Caicedo (15 October 1903 — 10 April 1985) was a Colombian industrialist, newspaper publisher, and politician. In 1949 Lloreda, along with his brothers Mario and Alfredo, founded the newspaper El País, which continues in print today. He was director of the newspaper for 25 years.

A Conservative party politician, he was elected as Mayor of his hometown of Santiago de Cali. Next he was elected to the Congress of Colombia, serving in both the Chamber of Representatives and the Senate.

In 1974, he was appointed Ambassador of Colombia to Spain.

== Personal life ==
He married Mercedes Caicedo de Lloreda of Costa Rica. They had three children together: Elvira, Álvaro Jose and Rodrigo Lloreda Caicedo. His younger son followed him into the newspaper business and politics.

== Legacy and honors ==
- In 1985 after Lloreda's death, the city of Santiago de Cali issued a decree in his honor for his many contributions to the community.
