= Stef Blok =

Dutch politician (born 1964)

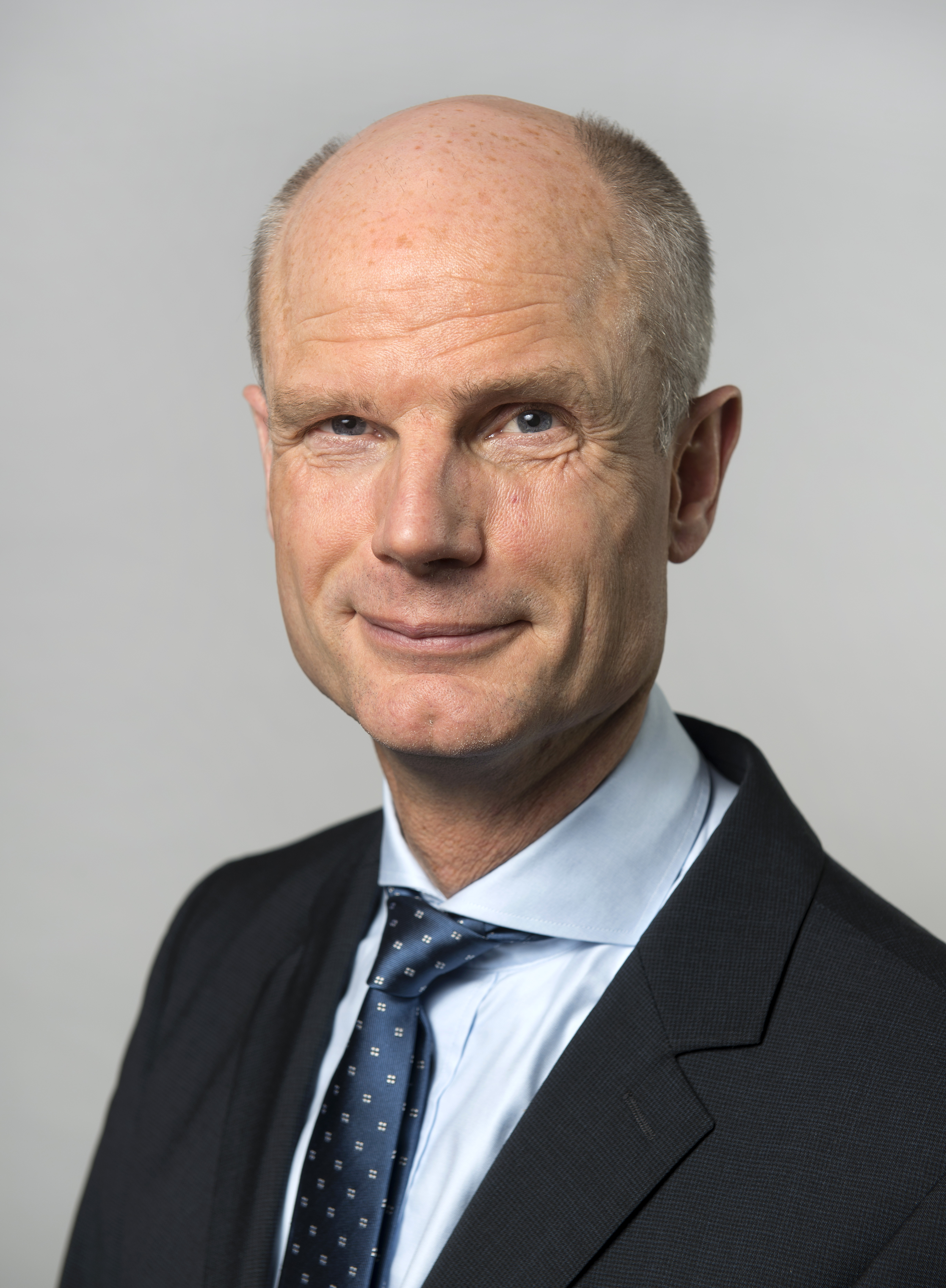
- Blok in 2018

Member of the European Court of Auditors for the Netherlands
- Incumbent
- Assumed office 1 September 2022
- President: Klaus-Heiner Lehne; Tony Murphy
- Preceded by: Alex Brenninkmeijer

Minister of Economic Affairs and Climate Policy
- In office 25 May 2021 – 10 January 2022
- Prime Minister: Mark Rutte
- Preceded by: Bas van 't Wout
- Succeeded by: Micky Adriaansens

Minister of Foreign Affairs
- In office 7 March 2018 – 25 May 2021
- Prime Minister: Mark Rutte
- Preceded by: Sigrid Kaag (ad interim)
- Succeeded by: Sigrid Kaag

Minister of Security and Justice
- In office 27 January 2017 – 26 October 2017
- Prime Minister: Mark Rutte
- Preceded by: Ard van der Steur
- Succeeded by: Ferdinand Grapperhaus as Minister of Justice and Security
- In office 10 March 2015 – 20 March 2015; Ad interim
- Prime Minister: Mark Rutte
- Preceded by: Ivo Opstelten
- Succeeded by: Ard van der Steur

Minister of the Interior and Kingdom Relations
- In office 29 June 2016 – 16 September 2016; Ad interim
- Prime Minister: Mark Rutte
- Preceded by: Ronald Plasterk
- Succeeded by: Ronald Plasterk

Minister for Housing and the Central Government Sector
- In office 5 November 2012 – 27 January 2017
- Prime Minister: Mark Rutte
- Preceded by: Office established
- Succeeded by: Office abolished

Parliamentary leader in the House of Representatives
- In office 8 October 2010 – 20 September 2012
- Preceded by: Mark Rutte
- Succeeded by: Mark Rutte
- Parliamentary group: People's Party for Freedom and Democracy

Member of the House of Representatives
- In office 3 September 2002 – 5 November 2012
- In office 25 August 1998 – 23 May 2002

Personal details
- Born: Stephanus Abraham Blok; 10 December 1964 (age 61) Emmeloord, Netherlands
- Party: People's Party for Freedom and Democracy (from 1988)
- Children: 1 son
- Education: University of Groningen (BBA, MBA)
- Occupation: Politician · Banker · Credit broker · Accountant

Stephanus Abraham "Stef" Blok (born 10 December 1964) is a Dutch politician who served as Minister of Economic Affairs and Climate Policy in the Third Rutte cabinet from 25 May 2021 till 10 January 2022. He is a member of the People's Party for Freedom and Democracy (VVD).

An accountant by occupation, Blok served as a member of the House of Representatives from 25 August 1998 until 23 May 2002 and from 3 September 2002 until 5 November 2012. After the election of 2010 the Leader of the People's Party for Freedom and Democracy and parliamentary leader in the House of Representatives Mark Rutte became Prime Minister in the First Rutte cabinet with Blok chosen to succeed him as parliamentary leader in the House of Representatives serving from 8 October 2010 until 20 September 2012. Following the election of 2012 Blok was asked to become Minister for Housing and the Central Government Sector in the Second Rutte cabinet taking office on 5 November 2012. Blok served as Acting Minister of Security and Justice from 10 March 2015 until 20 March 2015 following the resignation of Ivo Opstelten and ad interim Minister of the Interior and Kingdom Relations from 29 June 2016 until 16 September 2016 during a sick-leave of Ronald Plasterk.

On 27 January 2017, Minister of Security and Justice Ard van der Steur resigned to avoid a vote of no confidence, Blok was appointed to serve out the remainder of his term and subsequently resigned as Minister for Housing and the Central Government Sector the same day. He did not stand for the election of 2017 and announced his retirement. Following the resignation of Halbe Zijlstra as Minister of Foreign Affairs in the Third Rutte cabinet on 13 February 2018, Blok was nominated to succeed him taking office on 7 March 2018.

== Biography ==
=== Early life ===
Stephanus Abraham Blok was born on 10 December 1964 in Emmeloord, now in the Province of Flevoland. After attending Stedelijk Gymnasium Leiden from 1977 until 1983, he studied Business Administration at the University of Groningen from 1983 until 1989 and graduated with a Bachelor of Business Administration and an M.S. in Business Administration degree. Blok worked for ABN AMRO as a credit broker and later as a branch manager from 1989 until 1998.

He was a member of the municipal council of Nieuwkoop from 1994 to 1998.

One of his ancestors was J.F.A. Dligoor, an engineer working in Dutch East Indies (now Indonesia) in building Prijetan dam in Lamongan, East Java and who was buried in the country.

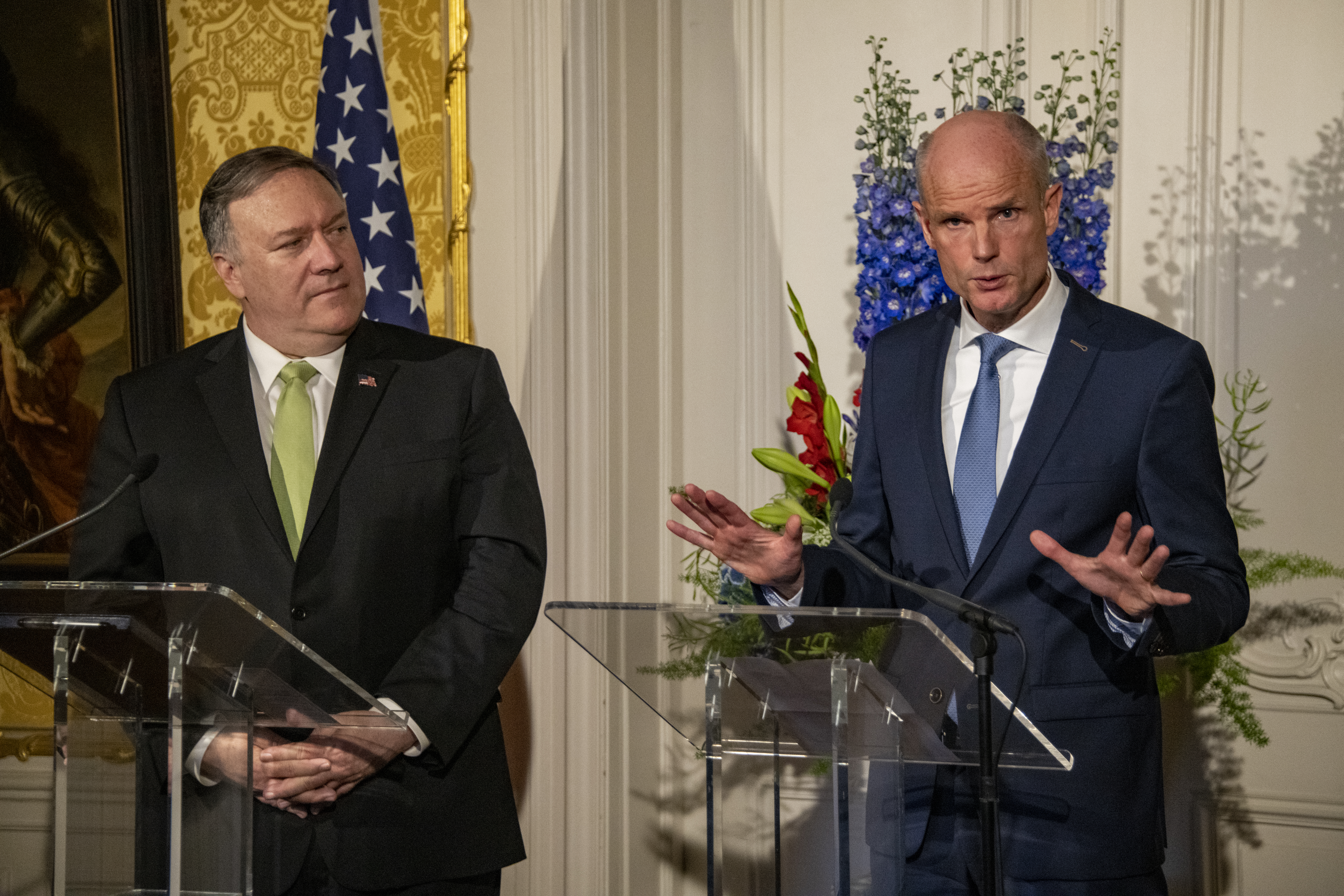
Blok speaks with U.S. Secretary of State Michael R. Pompeo in the Great Salon Room in The Hague, the Netherlands on June 3, 2019.

=== Politics ===
Blok served as Acting Minister of Security and Justice after the resignation of Ivo Opstelten from 10 March until 20 March 2015 while retaining his other cabinet position. He resigned as Minister for Housing and the Central Government Sector on 27 January 2017 to hold the title of Minister of Security and Justice in a full position until 26 October 2017, following the resignation of Ard van der Steur. Blok also served as Acting Minister of the Interior and Kingdom Relations from 29 June to 16 September 2016 while Ronald Plasterk underwent surgery. After his term as justice minister, Blok announced his plans to leave politics.

Following the resignation of Halbe Zijlstra as Minister of Foreign Affairs on 13 February 2018, Blok was selected to succeed him.

== Controversy ==
In July 2018, Blok expressed criticism of multiculturalism and argued that black African migrants could not be resettled in Eastern Europe because they would be beaten up, during a meeting that was later telecast on Zembla:

"Give me an example, of a multiethnic or multicultural society, where the original population are still living as well. [...] And where there are peaceful community relations. I am not aware of any."

An audience member suggested Suriname.

"Suriname peaceful? A functioning rule of law and democracy? Courageous, this remark. So the parties in Suriname are not divided by their ethnicity? [...] I admire your optimism. Suriname is a failed state and that is very much linked to its ethnic composition.”

One audience member suggested Singapore was a successful multi-ethnic society and Blok responded that Singapore is a “small mini-country,” which is “extremely selective in its migration” and does not allow poor immigrants except "maybe for cleaning."

His remarks led to the Government of Suriname to demand an apology and the island-government of Curaçao, part of the Dutch Kingdom, to distance itself from the minister's remarks. The latter responded to the minister's remarks by stating:

"Minister Blok's expressions are not representative of the reality in the Caribbean part of the Kingdom. On the contrary. In our view the Curacao multicultural society reflects a better picture of norms and values, such as justice, tolerance and freedom, which we share within the Kingdom."

In Suriname, both the government and the opposition opposed the idea that Suriname is a failed state due to its ethnic diversity. It prompted Chan Santokhi of the opposition Progressive Reform Party to respond:

"That Suriname under this government has become a country that some refer to as a ‘failed state’ is not due to its multicultural composition. Suriname is faced with a lack of good governance and unrestrained corruption."

== Honours ==
Blok received the following honours:

- Netherlands: Officer of the Order of Orange-Nassau
- Belgium: Grand Cross of the Order of Leopold II
- Estonia: Member 1st Class of the Order of the Cross of Terra Mariana (5 June 2018)
- Latvia: Grand Officer (2nd class) of the Order of the Three Stars
- Lithuania: Grand Cross of the Order for Merits to Lithuania
- Luxembourg: Grand Cross of the Order of Merit of the Grand Duchy of Luxembourg

Party political offices
| Preceded by Mark Rutte | Leader of the People's Party for Freedom and Democracy in the House of Representatives; 2010–2012 | Succeeded by Mark Rutte |
Political offices
| New office | Minister for Housing and the Central Government Sector; 2012–2017 | Position abolished |
| Preceded by Ivo Opstelten | Minister of Security and Justice; Acting; 2015 | Succeeded by Ard van der Steur |
| Preceded by Ronald Plasterk | Minister of the Interior and Kingdom Relations; Acting; 2016 | Succeeded by Ronald Plasterk |
| Preceded by Ard van der Steur | Minister of Security and Justice; 2017 | Succeeded by Ferdinand Grapperhaus |
| Preceded by Sigrid Kaag; Ad interim | Minister of Foreign Affairs; 2018–2021 | Succeeded by Sigrid Kaag |
