= Ildikó Pelczné Gáll =

Hungarian politician

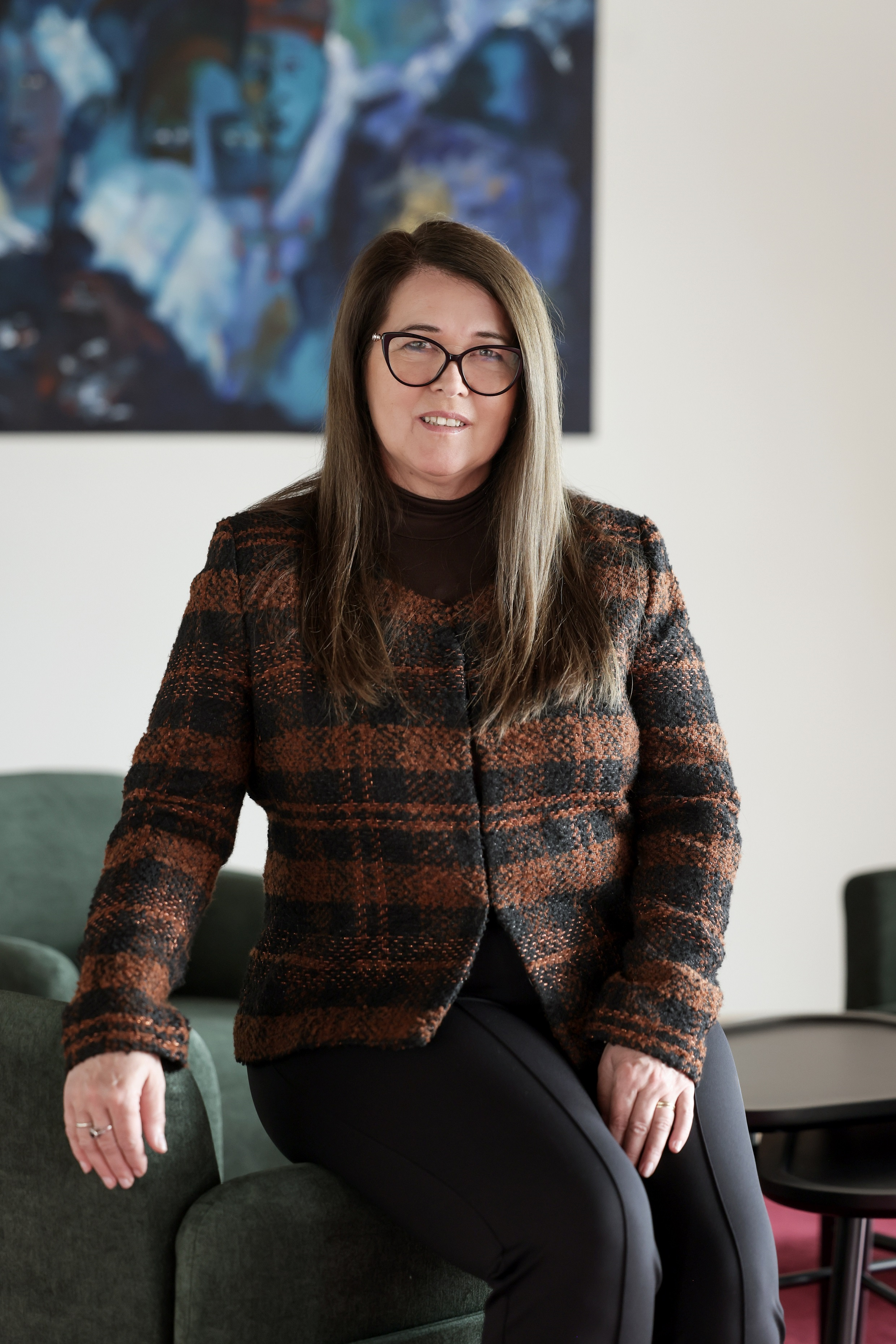

Member of the European Court of Auditors for Hungary
- Incumbent
- Assumed office 1 September 2017
- President: Klaus-Heiner Lehne; Tony Murphy
- Preceded by: Szabolcs Fazakas

Member of the European Parliament
- In office 2 June 2010 – 31 August 2017
- Constituency: Hungary

Deputy Speaker of the National Assembly of Hungary
- In office 14 July 2009 – 13 May 2010
- President: László Sólyom
- Preceded by: László Schmitt
- Succeeded by: János Áder

Member of the National Assembly
- In office 16 May 2006 – 2 June 2010
- Constituency: Budapest

Personal details
- Born: Ildikó Pelczné Gáll; 2 May 1962 (age 64) Szikszó, Hungary
- Party: Hungarian: Fidesz; EU: European People's Party
- Spouse: Gábor Pelcz
- Children: 3
- Education: University of Budapest

Ildikó Pelczné Gáll (née Gáll; born 2 May 1962) is a Hungarian politician and a former Member of the European Parliament (MEP) from Hungary. She is a member of Fidesz, part of the European People's Party.

She graduated from the Faculty of Mechanical Engineering at the Technical University of Heavy Industry in Miskolc. She studied at post-graduate in economics, has acquired rights and tax consultant auditor. She worked as a university lecturer, received a doctoral degree.

In 2005 she became a member of the national authorities of Fidesz. In 2006 she was elected deputy to the National Assembly. She was Vice-President of the fraction of Deputies of her group, and from July 2009 to May 2010 she served as Deputy Speaker of the Parliament.

In the 2010 national elections, she gained re-election. Soon after, she became a member of the European Parliament, when she replaced Pál Schmitt. Between 2014 and 2017, she was one of the Vice-Presidents of the European Parliament, representing the EPP group.

Since 2017, she is a Member of the European Court of Auditors.

== Personal life ==
She is married to Gábor Pelcz. They have three children.
