= Szabolcs Fazakas =

Hungarian politician (1947–2020)

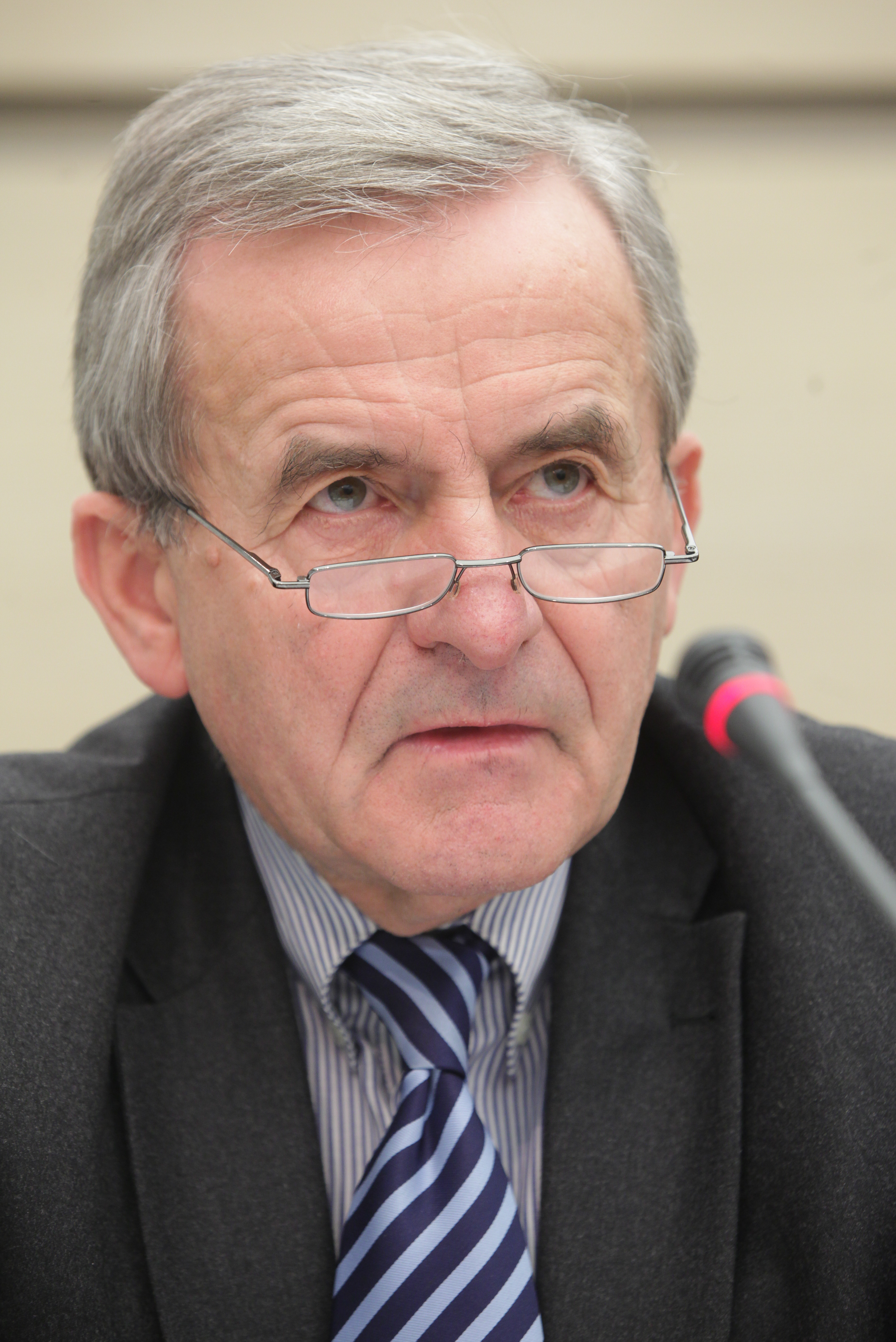
- Fazakas in 2012

Member of the European Court of Auditors for Hungary
- In office 7 May 2010 – 31 August 2017
- President: Vítor Manuel da Silva Caldeira; Klaus-Heiner Lehne
- Preceded by: Gezja Zsolt Halász
- Succeeded by: Ildikó Pelczné Gáll

Minister of Industry, Trade and Tourism
- In office 29 October 1996 – 8 July 1998
- Preceded by: Tamás Suchman (Industry and Trade)
- Succeeded by: Attila Chikán (Economy)

Personal details
- Born: 26 October 1947 Budapest, Hungary
- Died: 31 March 2020 (aged 72)
- Profession: economist, diplomat, politician

Szabolcs Fazakas (26 October 1947 – 31 March 2020) was a Hungarian politician and diplomat.

== Profession ==
Fazakas was born in Budapest, and earned a degree of external trade in 1971, graduating from Karl Marx University of Economic Sciences (present-day Corvinus University of Budapest). He taught as an assistant lecturer there from 1971 to 1973. Earning PhD, he was employed by the Ministry of External Trade (then Ministry of Trade) between 1973 and 1990, where he worked as a rapporteur for economic relations with West Germany and East Germany, then commercial counselor at Vienna, finally Head of Department responsible for OECD affairs and relations. He served as Deputy Minister of Trade, and was also Head of the Secretariat for International Economic Relations from 1989 to 1990.

Following the transition to democracy, Fazakas joined the private sector. He functioned as regional representative of the Österreichische Industrieholding (ÖIAG) in Budapest from 1990 to 1995. Besides that, he was also Chairman of the Supervisory Board of the European Commercial Bank Limited Liability Company from 1994 to 1995.

== Political career ==
Fazakas entered government service in the cabinet of Prime Minister Gyula Horn, when he held the position of Secretary of State for Administrative Affairs in the Ministry of Industry and Trade between 25 September 1995 and 15 July 1996. After that, he briefly served as Hungarian Ambassador to Germany from 30 August to 29 October 1996. Returning to Hungary, he functioned as Minister of Industry, Trade and Tourism from 29 October 1996 to 8 July 1998, until the 1998 parliamentary election. After the electoral defeat of the Hungarian Socialist Party (MSZP), Fazakas returned to the private sector. He was regional representative of the DaimlerChrysler automotive corporation between 1998 and 2002. He functioned as Chairman of the Board of GarAgent-Excel from 2000.

After the 2002 parliamentary election, when MSZP was able to form a government, Fazakas became a member of the National Assembly (MP) between 2002 and 2004, obtaining a mandate from the party's national list. He was a member of the Committee on Foreign Affairs. He was also delegated into the Interparliamentary Union from 2002 to 2004. He was then Member of the European Parliament (MEP) for the Hungarian Socialist Party, part of the Party of European Socialists from 2004 to 2009. On 23 July 2004, he was elected Chair of the Committee on Budgetary Control, holding the position until 30 January 2007, when he was elected one of the quaestors of the European Parliament for the second half of the term (2007–2009). His name appeared in the 6th place in the candidacy list of MSZP during the 2009 European Parliament election in Hungary, but the party gained only 4 seats, thus Fazakas lost his mandate.

Szabolcs Fazakas was elected to the European Court of Auditors on 7 May 2010, replacing Gejza Halász. During his nomination, Fidesz MEP Tamás Deutsch charged that he had voluntarily joined the Hungarian Secret Service during the communist dictatorship and worked there for more than 13 years as a secret agent, and was also involved in a suspicious arms procurement. Fazakas denied the charges and sued Deutsch. His mandate expired on 31 August 2017, he was replaced by Ildikó Pelczné Gáll.

== Personal life ==
He was married to Judit Benkő. They had two sons, Gergely and Balázs.

== Sources ==
- MTI Ki Kicsoda 2009, Magyar Távirati Iroda, Budapest, 2008, p. 310. (in Hungarian)
- Fazakas Szabolcs official page (in Hungarian)
- Fazakas Szabolcs on europarl.europa.eu
- Fazakas Szabolcs bio on mszp.hu (in Hungarian)
