= Hudya Group =

Nordic fintech company

- Formation: August 8, 2016; 9 years ago
- Type: Private
- Headquarters: Oslo, Norway
- Region served: Norway, Sweden and Denmark
- Services: Utility services, Telecom and Insurance services
- Key people: Børge Leknes (CEO), Morten Kvam (CCO), Pål Lauvrak (Head of Concept Development)
- Website: hudyagroup.com/en

Hudya is a Nordic fintech company. The company has developed a digital platform simplifying the purchase of traditional consumer services such as electricity, telecom, insurance and banking services. Headquartered in Oslo, Norway, Hudya has 32 subsidiaries in Norway, Sweden and Denmark, offering their services to customers in all Scandinavian countries. Hudya’s first product, Hudya Power, was launched in Norway in March 2017.

Hudya and Norwegian fintech company Payr announced their intention to merge in July 2019. In January 2020 Hudya announced their intention to conduct an initial public offering at Nasdaq First North.

== The service ==
Hudya offers a Scandinavian-wide digital platform for consumer services, including electricity, telecom, insurance and consumer loans. The company provides customers with services available on the same digital platform, making it easy to keep track of the various service agreements for the customer. In June 2017 Hudya Power was launched in Sweden in partnership with Energi Försäljning Sverige.

In December 2017 Hudya launched Hudya Power in Denmark, in partnership with Energi Denmark.

Hudya Insurance was launched in Norway in November 2018, as a partner for Frende Forsikring.

As of January 2020 Hudya has 60.000 users in the Nordics.

== History ==
Hudya was established in 2016 by Børge Leknes, Morten Kvam and Pål Lauvrak with Greger Teigre Wedel joining as CTO shortly after. Niclas Öst and Carsten Müller joined in the Spring of 2017 to lead Hudya in Sweden and Denmark respectively. In an equity investment round in June 2017 Hudya raised NOK 14 million. The fund was raised from various local private investors, including Adolfsen Group. Hudya has also received NOK 3 million from Norwegian Research Council.

In January 2020, Hudya announced their intention to conduct an initial public offering (IPO) on the Stockholm-based stock exchange Nasdaq First North. The IPO valued Hudya at SEK 400 million.

== Acquisitions and merger with Payr ==
Hudya Group follows a systematic growth strategy that includes strategic acquisitions to gather consumer-oriented services and products on their platform. The acquisitions include:

- In August 2017 Hudya acquired Swedish sales call centre Gradén Mattsson(221 employees).
- Acquisition of Norwegian credit broker Aconto AS and telecommunications operator Telipol in July 2018. With the acquisition of Telipol Hudya got access to their 15.000 customers.
- Acquisition of Swedish Conteo AB in April 2019 as a first step to launch refinancing in Sweden.
- The acquisition of fintech company SEQR Group in Sweden in June 2019 gave Hudya access to SEQR Groups fintech back-end infrastructure.

In July 2019 Hudya Group merged with Norwegian fintech startup Payr, with Payr CEO Espen Einn becoming Chief Payments Officer in Hudya. This gained attention from several Norwegian media outlets, who reported on their ambition to build a Nordic fintech giant.

=== Net worth ===
As of July 2017, the net worth of Hudya was NOK 140 million. In February 2020 the net worth of Hudya was reported to be SEK 400 million.
