= Daniel Caspary =

German politician (born 1976)

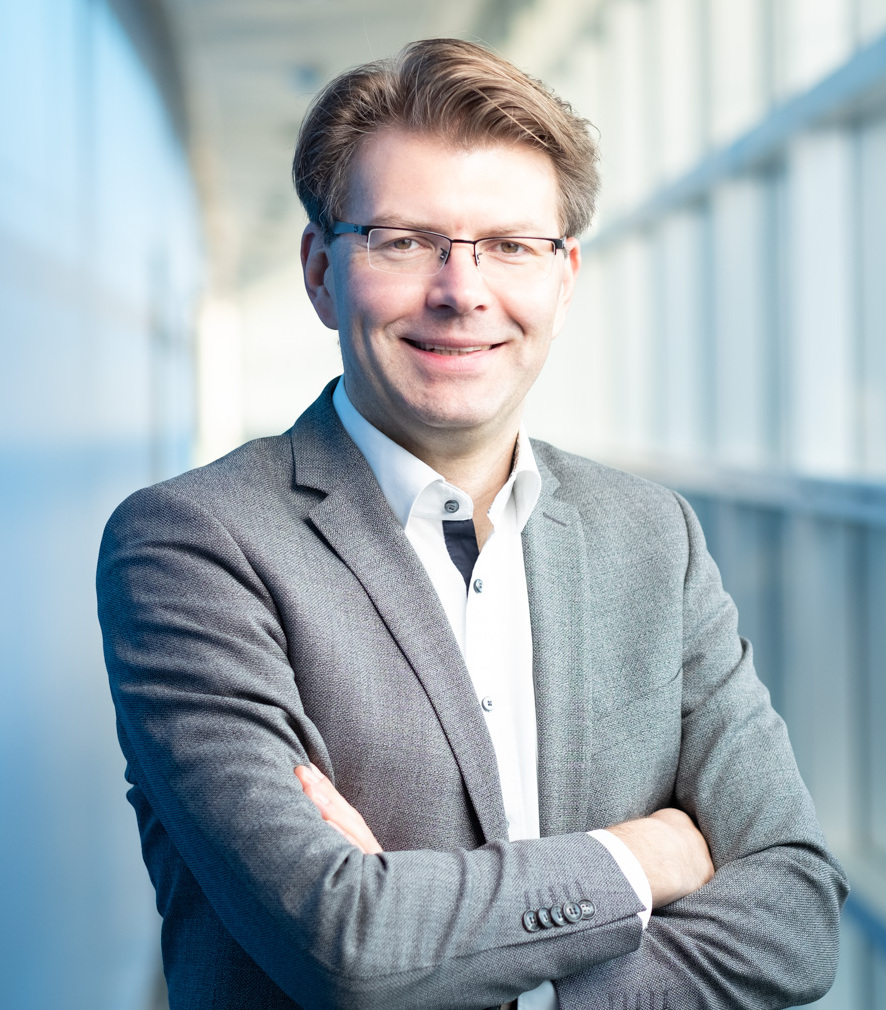
- Caspary in 2019

Member of the European Court of Auditors for Germany
- Incumbent
- Assumed office 1 March 2026
- President: Tony Murphy
- Preceded by: Klaus-Heiner Lehne

Member of the European Parliament
- In office 1 July 2004 – 28 February 2026
- Constituency: Germany

Personal details
- Born: Daniel Caspary; 4 April 1976 (age 50) Karlsruhe, Baden-Württemberg, West Germany (now Germany)
- Party: German: Christian Democratic Union; EU: European People's Party
- Education: University of Karlsruhe
- Website: www.caspary.de

Video Introduction (English) / (German)

Daniel Caspary (born 4 April 1976) is a German politician who has been serving as a member of the European Court of Auditors since 2026. Before that he was a Member of the European Parliament (MEP) from 2004. He is a member of the Christian Democratic Union (CDU), part of the European People's Party (EPP).

Caspary was elected chairman of the German CDU/CSU-delegation in the European Parliament in July 2017. He was deputy chairman of the Christian Democratic Union in his home-state of Baden-Württemberg. The non-governmental organization VoteWatch named Caspary the second-most influential MEP in EU trade policy in November 2016. In March 2017, Politico ranked Caspary as 25th most influential MEP out of all 751 members of the European Parliament. Since 2019, Caspary was the head of the parliamentary Delegation for relations with the Southeast Asian Nations (ASEAN).

== Early life and career ==
Caspary was born in Karlsruhe. Upon graduation from the Thomas Mann Gymnasium (Stutensee), Caspary served in the federal German armed forces as first lieutenant in the reserve. He studied technical economics at the University of Karlsruhe. Alongside his studies he worked as assistant to the State Minister of Agriculture in the state of Baden-Württemberg, Peter Hauk. He interned at J.P. Morgan in Frankfurt and London. After graduation in 2002, he worked at MVV Energie in Mannheim.

== Political career ==
=== Career in state politics ===
Between 1999 and 2002, Caspary was deputy-chairman of the Junge Union (JU) Baden-Württemberg, the youth organization of the Christian Democratic Union. From 2001 until 2008 he served as district chairman of the Junge Union in Nordbaden. Caspary has been district-chairman of the CDU Karlsruhe-Land from 2010 to 2024.

From 1999 until 2009 Caspary was a member of the city council in Stutensee.

=== Member of the European Parliament, 2004–2026 ===
Caspary was elected to the European Parliament in the 2004 elections, where he is a member of the European People's Party. He was a member of the committee on international trade and served as coordinator of the EPP group between 2009 and 2017. From 2015 until 2017, Caspary was the co-chair of the European People's Party trade ministers meetings alongside Jyrki Katainen, vice-president of the European Commission. From 2014 until 2017, he was chief-whip of the German CDU/CSU-delegation in the European Parliament. Caspary was elected chairman of the delegation in 2017. In this position, Caspary is an advisory member of the federal executive board of the Christian Democratic Union and member of the group bureau of the European People's Party. Furthermore, as a member of the European Parliament, he was an ex officio member of the committee on the affairs of the European Union in the German Bundestag.

Both in the sixth and seventh European Parliament, Caspary served as rapporteur on the trade agenda for Europe under the Europe 2020 strategy. Likewise, he was rapporteur on the legislative proposal on the access of third-country goods and services to the internal market of the EU in public procurement and access of EU goods and services to the public procurement markets of third countries.

In November 2008, Caspary was among those members of the European Parliament who witnessed the terror attacks on the Taj Mahal Palace Hotel in Mumbai, India.

At the party convention of the CDU Baden-Württemberg in September 2017 Caspary was elected deputy-chairman. In the negotiations to form a fourth coalition government under the leadership of Chancellor Angela Merkel following the 2017 federal elections, he was part of the working group on European affairs, led by Peter Altmaier, Alexander Dobrindt and Achim Post.

In May 2018, Caspary was re-established by the CDU Baden-Württemberg for the 2019 European elections.

In the negotiations to form a coalition government under the leadership of Minister-President of Baden-Württemberg Winfried Kretschmann following the 2021 state elections, Caspary co-chaired the working group on European and international affairs, alongside Theresa Schopper.

Caspary began his membership of the European Court of Auditors on 1 March 2026, having already vacated his European Parliament seat yesterday.

== Political positions ==
=== Domestic politics ===
Ahead of the 2021 national elections, Caspary endorsed Armin Laschet as the Christian Democrats' joint candidate to succeed Chancellor Angela Merkel.

=== Foreign investments ===
In April 2017, Caspary and nine further MEPs from the European People's Party introduced an initiative to monitor and control investments in strategic sectors in the EU by investors from third countries. He supports the introduction of a review mechanism on the European level.

=== Parliamentary oversight ===
In December 2016, the European Parliament adopted a reform of its rules of procedure proposed by Caspary. Minor and major interpellations for written answer were introduced to complement the established practice of parliamentary questions.

In a written question for oral answer Caspary criticised insufficient answers provided to members of the European Parliament by the European Commission. In a plenary speech in April 2017, he emphasised the need for adequate answers to enable MEPs to exercise their oversight function over the European Commission.

=== Trade policy ===
As EPP spokesperson on trade Caspary supported the conclusion of the Comprehensive Economic and Trade Agreement (CETA) between the European Union and Canada and criticized the blockade by the Walloon region, which delayed the official signing of the agreement in October 2016.

Caspary supports the conclusion of the Transatlantic Trade and Investment Partnership (TTIP) between the EU and the United States of America. In March 2013, he initiated the event series ‘Friends of TTIP’ as a platform for open and controversial discussion for representatives from politics, industries and civil society.

=== Working conditions in Bangladesh ===
In the debate about working conditions in Bangladesh resulting from repeated instances of fires and collapses of factory buildings, Caspary argues for a local improvement of working conditions in close cooperation with local authorities.

=== Import ban on products from Chinese Laogai ===
Since 2010 Caspary has been advocating to ban the import of goods produced in forced-labour camps in China.

== Other activities ==
Memberships (amongst others):

- European Energy Foundation (director)
- European Internet Foundation
- European Logistics Forum
- Friends of Vietnam Group
- German Red Cross (DRK)
- Konrad Adenauer Foundation
- Lions-Club Karlsruhe
- Paneuropean Union
- Transatlantic Policy Network

== Recognition ==
In a ranking of the forty most influential members of the European Parliament, Politico ranked Caspary 16th in May 2016. In a renewed ranking published in March 2017, he was ranked 25th. In November 2016, the non-governmental organization VoteWatch named Caspary the second-most influential MEP in EU trade policy.

== Personal life ==
Caspary lives in Weingarten. He is married and has five children.

== Literature ==
- Daniel Caspary, Jan Wißwässer und Julia Wolffson: EU und Mercosur – Ziele, Strategien und aktuelle Herausforderungen. In: Erich G. Fritz (Hrsg.): Brasilien: Auf dem Sprung zur Weltwirtschaftsmacht? Athena Verlag, 2013, ISBN 978-3-89896-550-7.
- Daniel Caspary, Jan Wißwässer: ACTA – Das Symbol. Urheberrecht im europapolitischen Fokus. In: Die Politische Meinung. 9/2012, 514, Konrad-Adenauer-Stiftung, ISSN 0032-3446, S. 10–14
- Daniel Caspary, Martina Chudejova und Jan Wißwässer: Das Freihandelsabkommen zwischen der Europäischen Union und Indien. In: Erich G. Fritz (Hrsg.): Entwicklungsland, Schwellenland, Global Player: Indiens Weg in die Verantwortung. Athena Verlag, 2010, ISBN 978-3-89896-401-2.
- Daniel Casparyː Mitglied des Europäischen Parlaments, Einblicke 2004–2019, von uns für Deutschland und Europa, Weingarten (Baden) 2018, ISBN 978-3-00-059375-8.
