= MyTomorrows =

Dutch healthcare company

myTomorrows
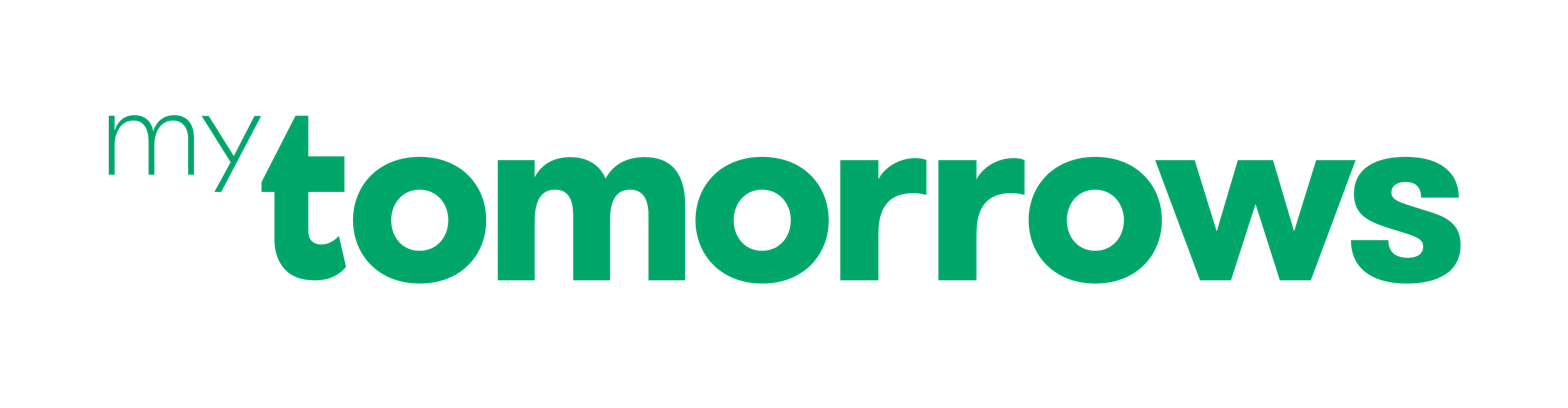
- Company type: Naamloze Vennootschap
- Industry: Healthcare, Pharmaceuticals
- Founded: 2012
- Headquarters: Amsterdam, Netherlands
- Key people: Ronald Brus (CEO), Ronald Plasterk (CSO)
- Products: Experimental drugs
- Website: mytomorrows.com

myTomorrows is the trade name of Impatients N.V., a globally active healthcare company. The company is based in the Zuidas, Amsterdam, Netherlands. myTomorrows provides patients with unmet medical needs, and their doctors, information about treatment options worldwide and facilitates access to medicines in development. Access to these medicines can be achieved via clinical trials, expanded access and off-label use.

myTomorrows was founded in 2012 by Ronald Brus, former CEO of the biotechnology company Crucell. In the beginning of its existence, myTomorrows has been characterized as innovative and controversial. In May 2013, MP Lea Bouwmeester asked parliamentary question about the company. In December 2017, former minister Ronald Plasterk joined the company as Chief Scientific Officer.
