= Marek Opioła =

Polish politician (born 1976)

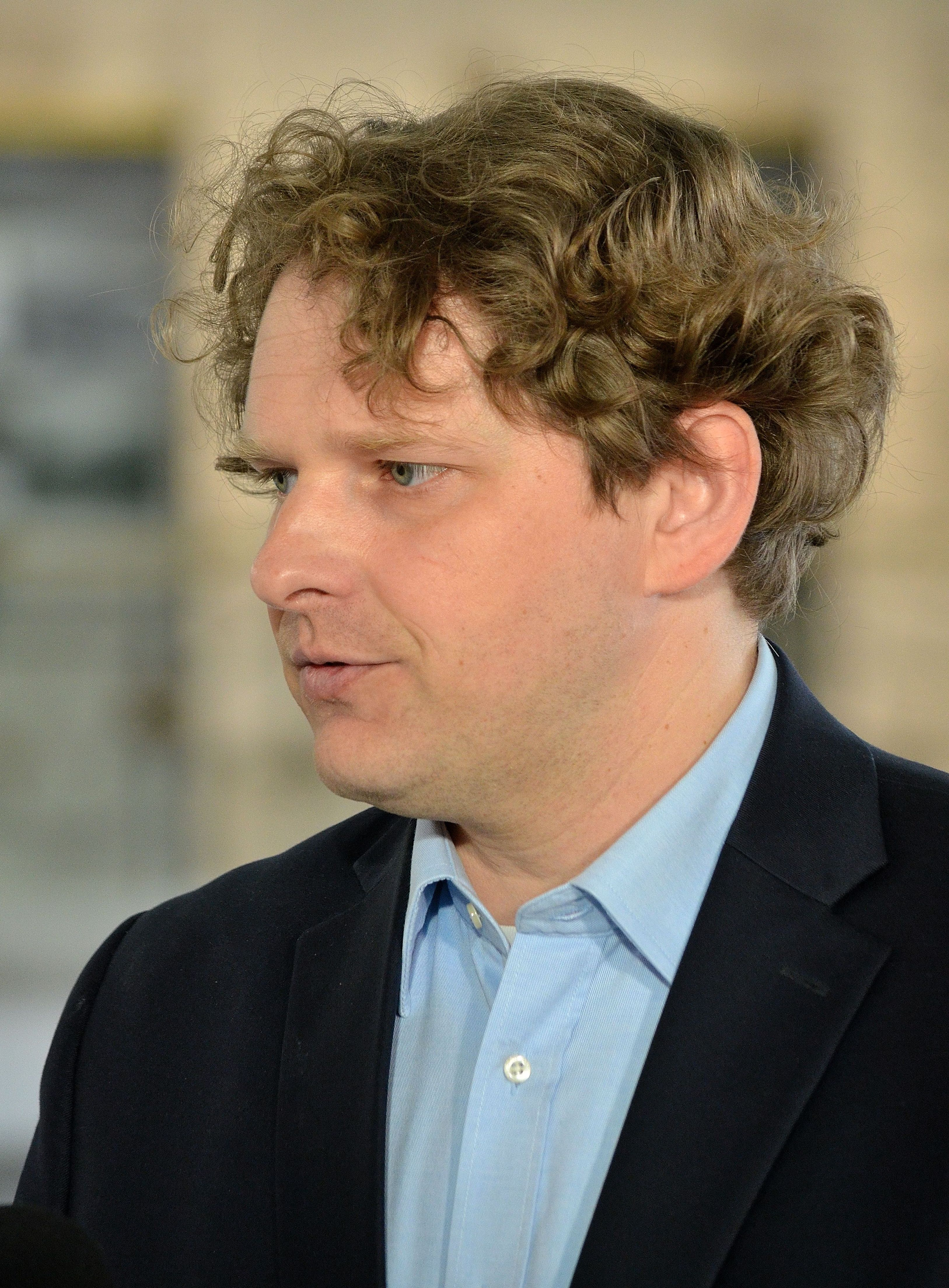

Member of the Sejm
- Incumbent
- Assumed office 25 September 2005
- Constituency: 16 – Płock

Personal details
- Born: 24 September 1976 (age 49)
- Party: Law and Justice

Marek Opioła (born 24 September 1976 in Warsaw) is a Polish politician. He was elected to the Sejm on 25 September 2005, with 5,301 votes in 16 Płock district as a candidate from the Law and Justice list. After leaving the Sejm in 2019, Opioła became vice-president of the Supreme Audit Office of Poland. He was appointed to the European Court of Auditors from 1 February 2021 to 6 May 2022 and is nominated for re-election.

== See also ==
- Members of Polish Sejm 2005-2007
