= Joëlle Elvinger =

Luxembourgish politician

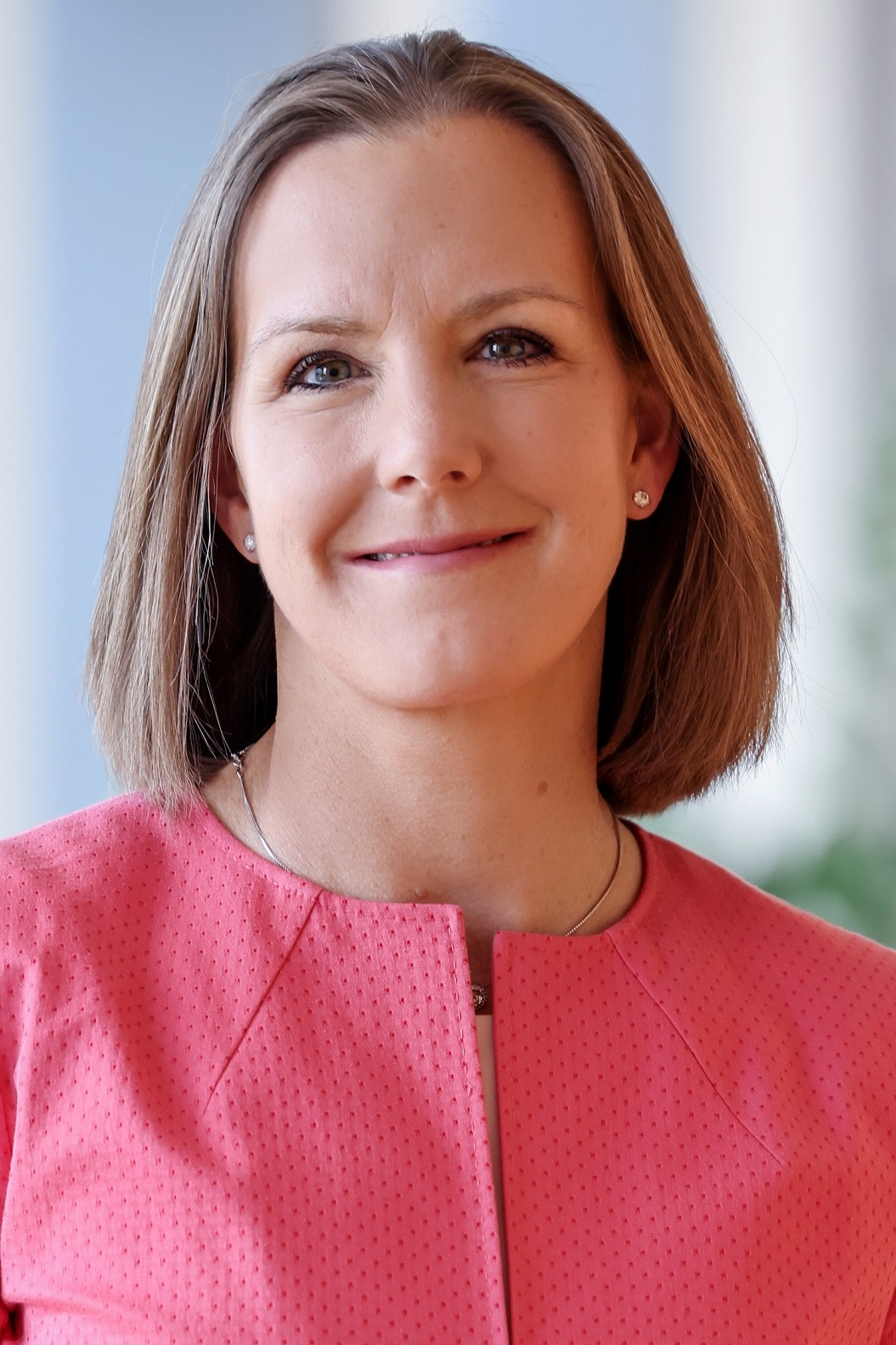
Official portrait of Joëlle Elvinger

Joëlle Elvinger is a lawyer and politician from Luxembourg. A member of the Democratic Party, she served in the Chamber of Deputies from 2013 to 2019.

== Biography ==
=== Early life ===
Joëlle Elvinger was born in Luxembourg City to René Elvinger, an industrialist and president of Cebi International. Today, Joelle sits on the board of directors for Cebi International. Politically, her father was involved with the Democratic Party's youth wing and her uncle sits on the Communal Council for Walferdange.

Elvinger received her master's degree in business law from Paul Cézanne University in Marseille and a Master of Laws at Queen Mary University of London.

=== Political career ===
Elvinger first ran in the 2005 communal elections and was elected to the Communal Council of Walferdange, where she became échevin in 2011. On January 18, 2016, she was sworn in as mayor of the commune, a position she held until November 30, 2017.

Following the 2013 Luxembourg general election and the appointment of Corinne Cahen to the Xavier Bettel government, Elvinger entered the Chamber of Deputies for the Centre constituency as a member of the Democratic Party. Notably, she was a member of the Budget and Finance Committee, the Labor, Work and Social Security Committee and served as rapporteur for the 2018 Budget.

In November 2019, Elvinger was elected to replace Henri Grethen in the European Court of Auditors, taking her seat on January 1, 2020. Her position in the Chamber of Deputies was filled by Claude Lamberty and her communal seat was filled by Gallinaro.
