= Hubert Weber (judge) =

Austrian judge

Hubert Weber (born 1939) was the President of the European Court of Auditors (ECA) from 2005 until January 2008. He was born in Vienna (Austria) in 1939 and is a Doctor of Law of the University of Vienna.

Weber worked in the Austrian civil service between 1959 and 1970, then becoming an auditor at the Austrian Court of Auditors and from 1971 also becoming involved with the International Organization of Supreme Audit Institutions. He became a member of the European Court on 1 March 1999 and was elected President on 16 January 2005.
