= Ronald Plasterk =

Dutch politician and scientist (born 1957)

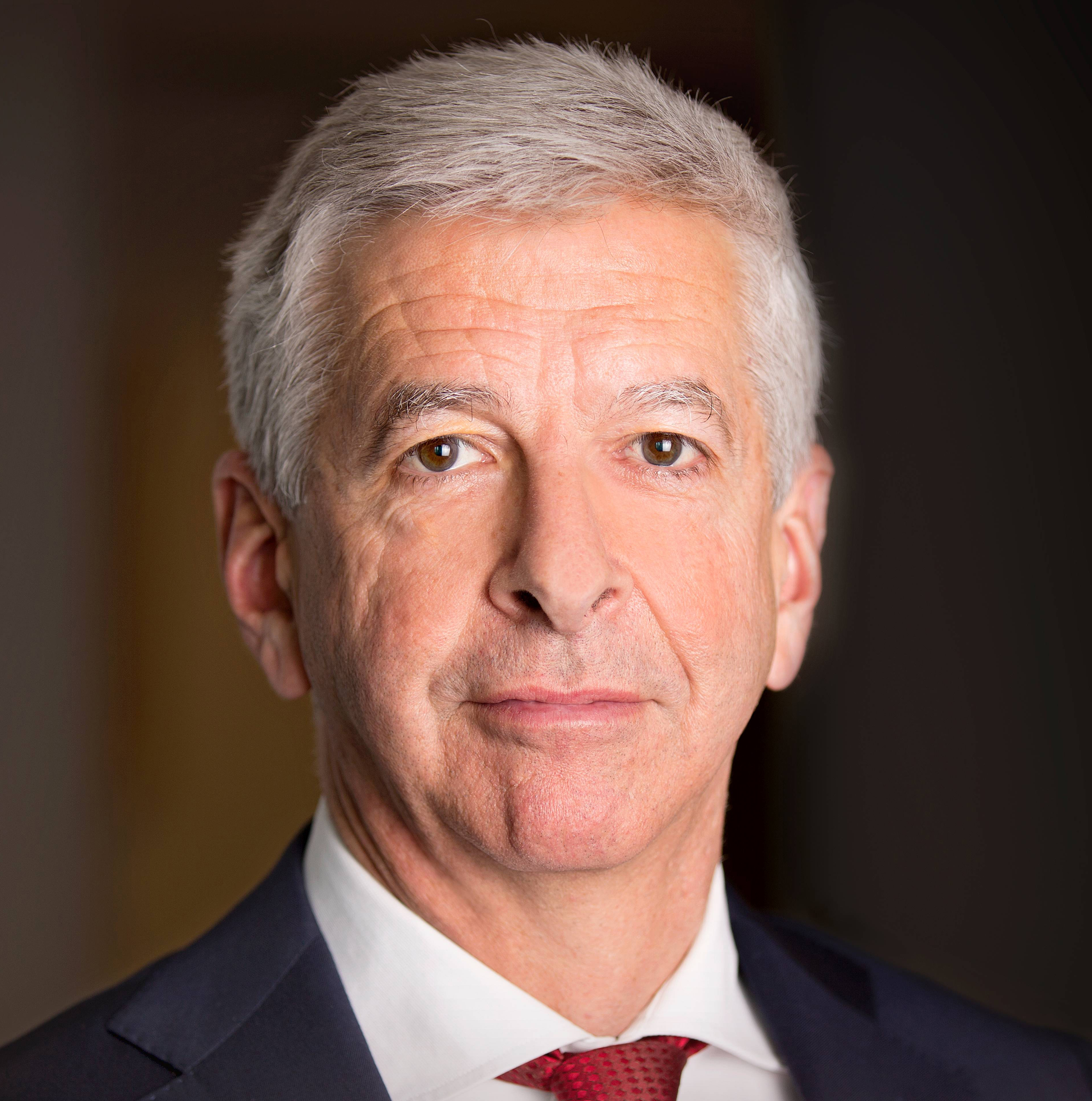
- Plasterk in 2015

Minister of the Interior and Kingdom Relations
- In office 16 September 2016 – 26 October 2017
- Prime Minister: Mark Rutte
- Preceded by: Stef Blok (acting)
- Succeeded by: Kajsa Ollongren
- In office 5 November 2012 – 29 June 2016
- Prime Minister: Mark Rutte
- Preceded by: Liesbeth Spies
- Succeeded by: Stef Blok (acting)

Minister of Education, Culture and Science
- In office 22 February 2007 – 23 February 2010
- Prime Minister: Jan Peter Balkenende
- Preceded by: Maria van der Hoeven
- Succeeded by: André Rouvoet

Member of the House of Representatives
- In office 17 June 2010 – 5 November 2012

Personal details
- Born: Ronald Hans Anton Plasterk; 12 April 1957 (age 69) The Hague, Netherlands
- Party: PvdA (1978–2025)
- Spouse: Els Beumer (m. 1990)
- Children: 2
- Education: Leiden University (MSc, PhD); University of Amsterdam (P)

Ronald Hans Anton Plasterk (Dutch pronunciation: [ˈroːnɑlt ˈɦɑns ˈɑntɔm ˈplɑstɛr(ə)k]; born 12 April 1957) is a Dutch retired politician of the Labour Party (PvdA). He has a PhD degree in biology, specialising in molecular genetics. He is founder and CEO of Frame Cancer Therapeutics. He was appointed professor at the University of Amsterdam in September 2018.

== Education and scientific career ==
Plasterk was born in The Hague, and he attended the Sint Janscollege secondary school at gymnasium level between 1969 and 1975. He then studied biology at the Leiden University and economics at the University of Amsterdam. During this period, he wrote for the student newspaper and served as treasurer of the Augustinus student association. In 1981, he obtained an MSc degree Cum Laude in biology. He obtained his propaedeutic diploma in economics in the same year. From 1981 to 1984 he worked as a researcher at the biomedical institute of Leiden University before earning his PhD degree in mathematics and natural science in 1984. He did genetic research into flatworms for his thesis entitled "Inversion of the G segment of bacteriophage Mu: analysis of a genetic switch".

Between 1985 and 1986, he worked as a postdoctoral researcher at the California Institute of Technology in Pasadena. There he studied the transposon sequences in DNA in the parasite Borrelia hermsii. Between 1986 and 1987 he was a post-doc at the MRC Laboratory of Molecular Biology in Cambridge, where he worked with John Sulston. He studied Caenorhabditis elegans, a nematode that is used as a model organism.

In 1987 he returned to the Netherlands where he became group leader and member of the board of the Netherlands Cancer Institute in Amsterdam. In July 1989, he became director of the research school of oncology at the institute, where he remained until February 2000. Between January 1993 and February 1997, he occupied the endowed chair in molecular microbiology at the Vrije Universiteit Amsterdam. Between 1997 and 2000 he was professor of molecular genetics at the University of Amsterdam. In February 2000 he became director of the Royal Netherlands Academy of Arts and Sciences, also known as the Hubrecht Institute, an institute of the Royal Netherlands Academy of Arts and Sciences (KNAW). He combined this with a position as professor in developmental genetics at Utrecht University from May 2000. He retained these positions until February 2007.

Since 2001 Plasterk has been a member of the Royal Netherlands Academy of Arts and Sciences. Before entering politics he also was a member of the Health Council, which advises the Minister of Health, Welfare and Sport, a member of the board of the Wellcome Trust, member of the Committee on Biotechnology and Animals and of the European Molecular Biology Organization.

Plasterk's research was in the area of genetics and functional genomics. He focused on the mechanism and regulation of DNA transposition, and on the mechanisms of RNA interference and microRNAs, including the functions of RNAi as a natural defense against the uncontrolled duplication of transposons.

== Politics ==
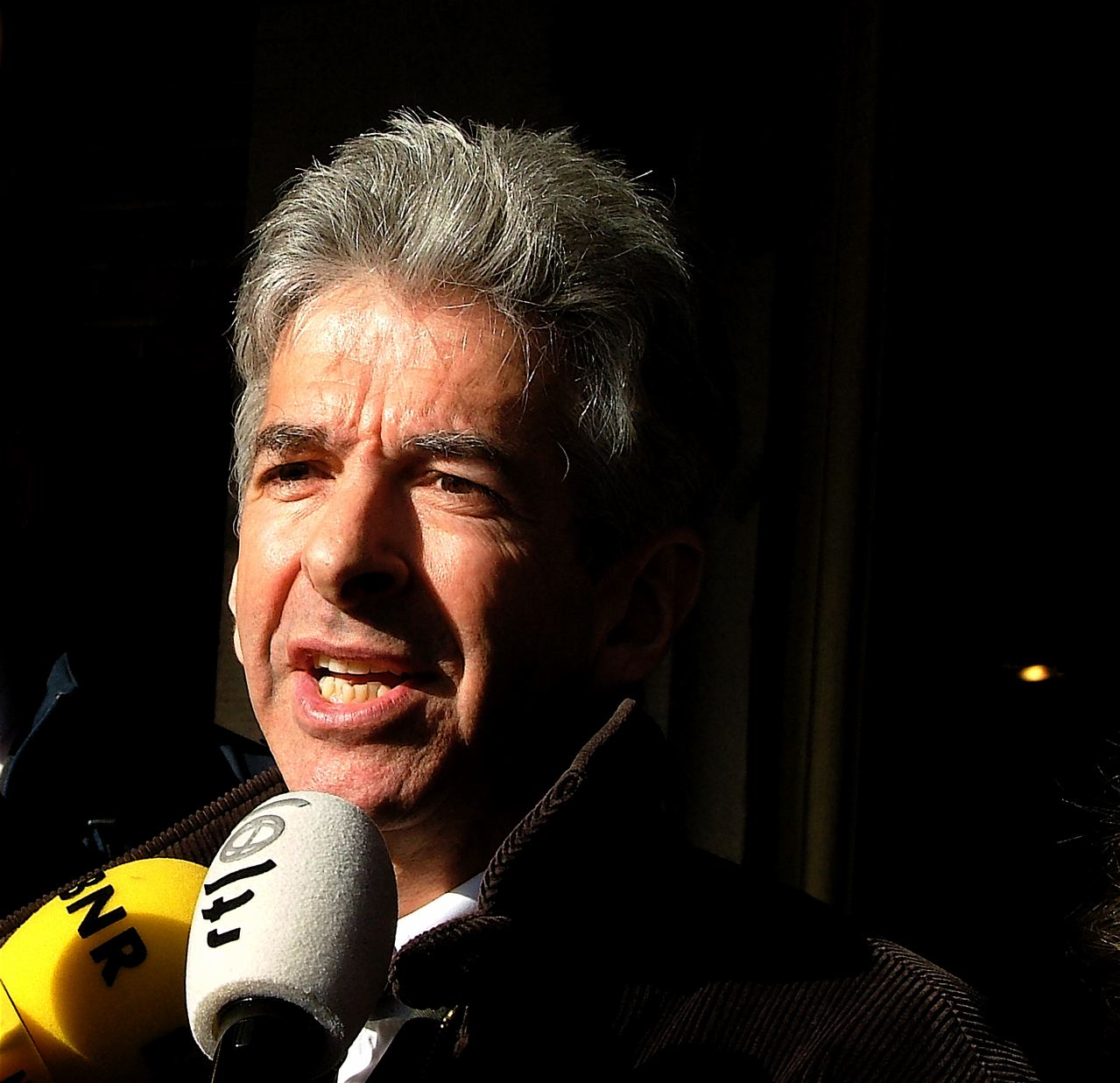
Plasterk giving a press statement in 2006

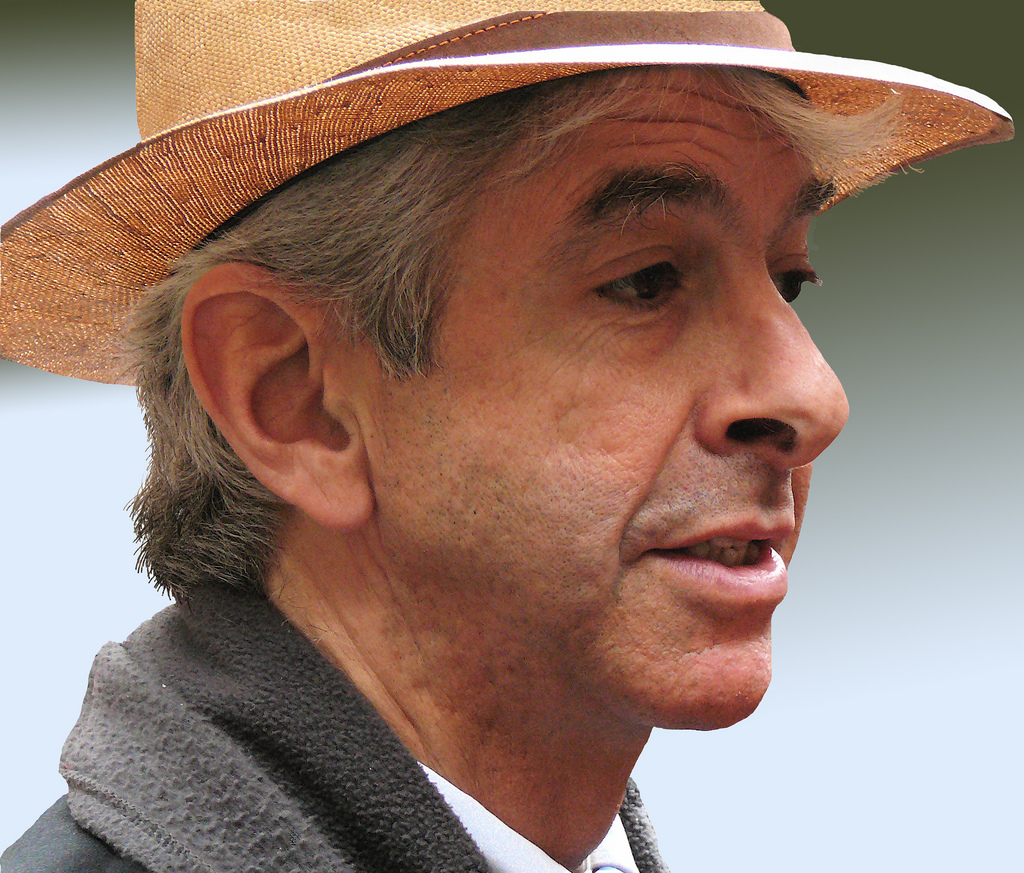
Ronald Plasterk with his trademark hat in 2008

An admirer of Prime Minister Joop den Uyl, Plasterk joined the Labour Party in 1977 as a student. He served on the Municipal Council of Leiden from 11 October 1982 until 1 September 1984 while a doctoral researcher. Since 1995, he has been a political columnist for several national publications and a commentator on TV. In the mid-2000s, he assumed several more active posts in national politics. He served as an advisor of the national convention, a think tank of the Dutch government on government reform.

=== Minister of Education, Culture and Science ===
Plasterk helped write the Labour Party's election program for the November 2006 general election, when his party received the second-highest vote total. On 22 February 2007, he was appointed minister of Education, Culture and Science in the fourth Balkenende cabinet for the Labour Party. He ended his scientific career, considering it impossible to leave research for several years and then hope to reintegrate. Wouter Bos, leader of the Labour Party, sees Plasterk as a social and cultural libertarian, who balances out the social and cultural conservativism of the Labour Party's coalition partners Christian Democratic Appeal and the Christian Union.

As minister Plasterk was responsible for higher education and scientific education, for research, culture and media, women's emancipation and of the LBGT, and for policy on the unemployed in the education sector. As such he is vice chair of the national Innovation Platform and member of the task force Women on Top.

A key issue during Plasterk's period as minister was the salary of teachers. When there was no room in the national budget to increase the salaries of teachers as advised by a committee led by Alexander Rinnooy Kan, Plasterk was forced to find money from within the budget of his own ministry. Kan made his advice public just days after the Miljoenennota (the national budget) was published. One of the solutions Plasterk considered was cutting the allowance for students and raising the fees for universities. Plasterk was strongly criticized by the students unions for his proposals and by his coalition partners CDA and CU and the leftwing opposition parties SP and GroenLinks. In the end he and Wouter Bos, the minister of Finance, were able to find sufficient money for a marked increase in the salaries of teachers. Under the pressure of strikes by teachers, Plasterk came to a deal with the teachers´ union in April 2008.

The Cabinet Balkenende IV fell on 20 February 2010 after tensions in the coalition over the extension of the Dutch involvement in the Task Force Urozgan of the International Security Assistance Force (ISAF) in Afghanistan and continued to serve in a demissionary capacity until the Labour Party cabinets members resigned on 23 February 2010.

=== Continued political career ===
Plasterk successfully ran for the Member of the House of Representatives in the June 2010 general election as the Labour's Party third candidate, taking office on 17 June 2010. He served as the party's spokesperson for finances. When Job Cohen announced he was stepping down as leader of the Labour Party and as its parliamentary leader in the House following increasing criticism on his leadership, Plasterk announced his candidacy to succeed him. Plasterk lost the leadership election with 30% of the vote total to fellow frontbencher Diederik Samsom on 16 March 2012.

Following the election of 2012 Plasterk was appointed as Minister of the Interior and Kingdom Relations in the Cabinet Rutte II, taking office on 5 November 2012. He did not succeed to merge the provinces of North Holland, Flevoland, and Utrecht and to reduce the memberships of provincial councils and executives. In an interview with Nieuwsuur, Plasterk claimed that the American government was mass surveilling Dutch phone conversations. He had to defend himself in front of the House of Representatives, when it was concluded the phone tapping had been performed by the Dutch General Intelligence and Security Service (AIVD). Plasterk took a medical leave between 29 June and 16 September 2016 during which Minister for Housing and the Central Government Sector Stef Blok served as acting minister. On 10 September 2016, Plasterk announced his retirement from national politics and that he would not stand for the election of 2017. The Cabinet Rutte II was replaced by the Cabinet Rutte III following the cabinet formation of 2017 on 26 October 2017.

== Columnist ==
Plasterk started as a columnist in the Intermediair, a weekly magazine oriented at young professionals and academics, in 1995. In the early years he mainly wrote on the political and ethical aspects of genetic research. In 1999 he switched from his column in the Intermediair to a weekly column in de Volkskrant, a leading centre left quality newspaper and a two-weekly spoken column in Buitenhof, a political talkshow produced by the VPRO, the NPS and the VARA. He continued these columns until 2007 when he became minister. In his columns, he fiercely opposed the proposal of Maria van der Hoeven, who preceded him as minister of Education, to teach intelligent design in high schools. Furthermore, in the referendum on the European constitution, he positioned himself as an outspoken critic of the Treaty establishing a Constitution for Europe. He opposed the constitution because he considered that it did not clearly codify the responsibilities of the European Union. He also felt that it laid too much emphasis on the free market. In 2000, several of his columns were bundled in the book Leven uit het Lab ("Life from the Lab").

Plasterk's convictions moved to the political right in columns for De Telegraaf after his retirement from politics. He wrote that the Labour Party had lost touch with regular citizens, and he opined that the state of Dutch nature was not deteriorating during the nitrogen crisis in the Netherlands.

Plasterk is an atheist. In 1997 he coined the term ietsisme ("somethingism") to refer to the religious belief that the Christian God does not exist, but that there is some greater force that created the universe and governs it. This position is roughly equivalent to 18th century Deism. He first strongly criticized the belief on intellectual grounds, calling it a "poor and irritating phenomenon", but later claimed that it was a mix of atheism and nostalgia, and much more sympathetic "than the idea of a cruel God that wants this misery".

== Return to microbiology ==
Following his retirement from national politics in October 2017, Plasterk continued his scientific work in the private sector. He became chief scientific officer of myTomorrows, a company that connects patients with experimental treatments.

He started working with microbiologist Jan Koster of the Academic Medical Center (soon to become Amsterdam UMC through a merger) on developing methods for cancer immunotherapy through vaccines using biological data collected by Koster. In the data, they found similar frameshift mutations of tumors in different patients, leading to a list of potential vaccines. While they were working on a scientific paper, Plasterk filed a patent for a method to develop personalized cancer treatments in July 2018, and he established a company called Frame Pharmaceuticals in December 2018. His investors and shareholders were Dinko Valerio, Bob Löwenberg, and René Beukema, who had all earned their wealth through the sale of biotechnology company Crucell. Valerio had worked with Plasterk in the 1990s, and Löwenberg had introduced him to Koster. In the meantime, Plasterk had rejoined the University of Amsterdam, to which Amsterdam UMC is affiliated, as a professor with a zero-hour contract in September 2018. He acknowledged that he mostly kept doing research for his own company with the exception of sporadic lectures and supervising some internships.

Frame Pharmaceuticals received €1 million in subsidies to apply their personalized cancer treatments in partnership with Amsterdam UMC and the University Medical Center Groningen (UMCG). Plasterk's company was acquired by German biopharmaceutical company CureVac in July 2022 for €32 million, half of which was conditional on future results. Preparations for a clinical trial at UMCG on lung cancer patients were halted.

== 2023–2024 cabinet formation ==
In November 2023, Plasterk was appointed scout during the 2023–2024 cabinet formation, and he later became informateur for a coalition consisting of the PVV, the VVD, NSC, and BBB. The week before Plasterk would release his report – in February 2024 – NSC pulled out of the talks, citing financial setbacks and Plasterk's delayed information about them. Plasterk called the statement "muddled" and denied having withheld details. In his final report, he advised the four parties to continue talking, and Kim Putters was selected as the new informateur. When the four parties reached a coalition agreement on 16 May 2024, national media outlets reported that Wilders had proposed Plasterk for the position of Prime Minister of the Netherlands. As part of the negotiations, the parties had agreed to not select their own party leaders. Pieter Omtzigt, leader of the NSC, reportedly opposed Plasterk's nomination for prime minister.

Two months earlier, newspaper NRC had chronicled Plasterk's scientific career in the private sector in the preceding years. They noted the absence of Koster's name in the patent application for their cancer treatment method, and the fact that Amsterdam UMC (Koster's employer) had not shared in the profit's resulting from their joint research. The NRC article noted that as Minister of Education, Culture and Science, Plasterk had successfully worked on a system to have researchers and universities share in profits resulting from their findings. Koster admitted he had not shared interest in commercial applications. The university medical center had found out about the patent when the scientific paper of Plasterk and Koster was published in April 2019. In response to the article, Plasterk denied that Koster had been involved in the inventive step for the cancer treatment method despite their scientific paper crediting Koster with developing the method and performing the bioinformatics analysis. Amsterdam UMC announced in early May that it would perform an investigation. Additionally, a criminal complaint for economic offenses and falsification of documents was filed by an attorney, who argued Plasterk had wrongfully referred to his company as a microbusiness in 2022.

Plasterk withdrew himself as a candidate for prime minister on 20 May 2024, stating that the public perception of the accusations would hinder his ability to function effectively in the role. The Public Prosecution Service later decided not to bring any charges related to the criminal complaint. Amsterdam UMC concluded that Koster should have been recognized as co-inventor, and it filed a civil case against Plasterk and CureVac to be recognized as co-inventor and co-owner of the patents and to receive damages.

== Personal life ==
Plasterk is married and has two children. He lives in Amsterdam. Plasterk is a member of the Royal Christian Oratory Association "Excelsior" in Amsterdam, an evangelical choir in which he sings as a tenor. He participates in the yearly recital of the Mattheus Passion of Johann Sebastian Bach of Excelsior. His other hobbies include literature, painting and photography.

In the summer of 2008 he appeared in Zomergasten, an evening long in-depth television interview of the VPRO.

== Awards and decorations ==
- 1999: Spinoza Prize of the Netherlands Organisation for Scientific Research
- 2002: Award for Communication in the Life Sciences of European Molecular Biology Organization
- 2005: Grand Prix scientifique de la Fondation Louis D. of the Institut de France (shared with American molecular biologist David P. Bartel)
- 2010: Officer of the Order of Orange-Nassau

== Bibliography ==
=== Selected scientific publications ===
- Ketting, R.F., Fischer, S.E.J., Bernstein, E., Sijen, T., Hannon, G.J., Plasterk R.H.A. (2001). Dicer functions in RNA interference and in synthesis of small RNA involved in developmental timing in C. elegans. Genes & Development 15: 2654–2659.
- Sijen, T., Fleenor, J., Simmer, F., Thijssen, K.L., Parrish, S., Timmons, L., Plasterk, R.H.A., Fire, A. (2001). On the role of RNA amplification in dsRNA-triggered gene silencing. Cell 107: 465–476.
- Tijsterman, M., Ketting, R.F., Okihara, K. L., Sijen, T., Plasterk, R. H. A. (2002) Short antisense RNAs can trigger gene silencing in C. elegans, depending on the RNA helicase MUT-14. Science 25;295 (5555): 694–697
- Wienholds, E., Schulte-Merker, S., Walderich, B., Plasterk, R.H.A. (2002) Target-selected inactivation of the zebrafish rag1 gene. Science 297 (July 5): 99–102.
- Wienholds, E., Koudijs, M.J., Van Eeden, F.J.M., Cuppen, E., Plasterk, R.H.A. (2003) The microRNA-producing enzyme Dicer 1 is essential for zebrafish development. Nature Genetics 35: 217–218.
- Sijen, T., Plasterk, R.H.A. (2003) Transposon silencing in the Caenorhabditis elegans germ line by natural RNAi. Nature 426: 310–314.
- Berezikov, E., Guryev, V., van de Belt, J., Wienholds, E., Plasterk, R.H.A., Cuppen, E. (2005) Phylogenetic shadowing and computational identification of human microRNA genes. Cell 120: 21–24.
- Robert, V.J.P., Sijen, T., van Wolfswinkel, J., Plasterk, R.H.A. (2005) Chromatin and RNAi factors protect the C. elegans germline against repetitive sequences. Genes Dev. 19: 782–787.
- Sijen T., Steiner F.A., Thijssen K.L., Plasterk R.H.A. (2007) Secondary siRNAs result from unprimed RNA synthesis and form a distinct class. Science. 2007 Jan 12;315(5809): 244–7. - Retracted in 2020.
- Koster, J., Pasterk, R.H.A. (2019) A library of Neo open Reading Frame peptides (Nops) as a sustainable resource of common neoantigens in up to 50% of cancer patients. Scientific Reports. 9:6577.

=== Popular scientific publications ===
- Wormen en waarden (1993)
- Techniek van het leven: de betekenis van biotechnologie voor mens en samenleving (2000)
- Leven uit het lab (2002)

Political offices
Preceded by Maria van der Hoeven	Minister of Education, Culture and Science; 2007–2010	Succeeded by André Rouvoet
Preceded by Liesbeth Spies	Minister of the Interior and Kingdom Relations; 2012–2016; 2016–2017	Succeeded by Stef Blok; Ad interim
Preceded by Stef Blok; Ad interim	Minister of the Interior and Kingdom Relations; 2012–2016; 2016–2017	Succeeded by Kajsa Ollongren
