= Ard van der Steur =

Dutch politician and lawyer

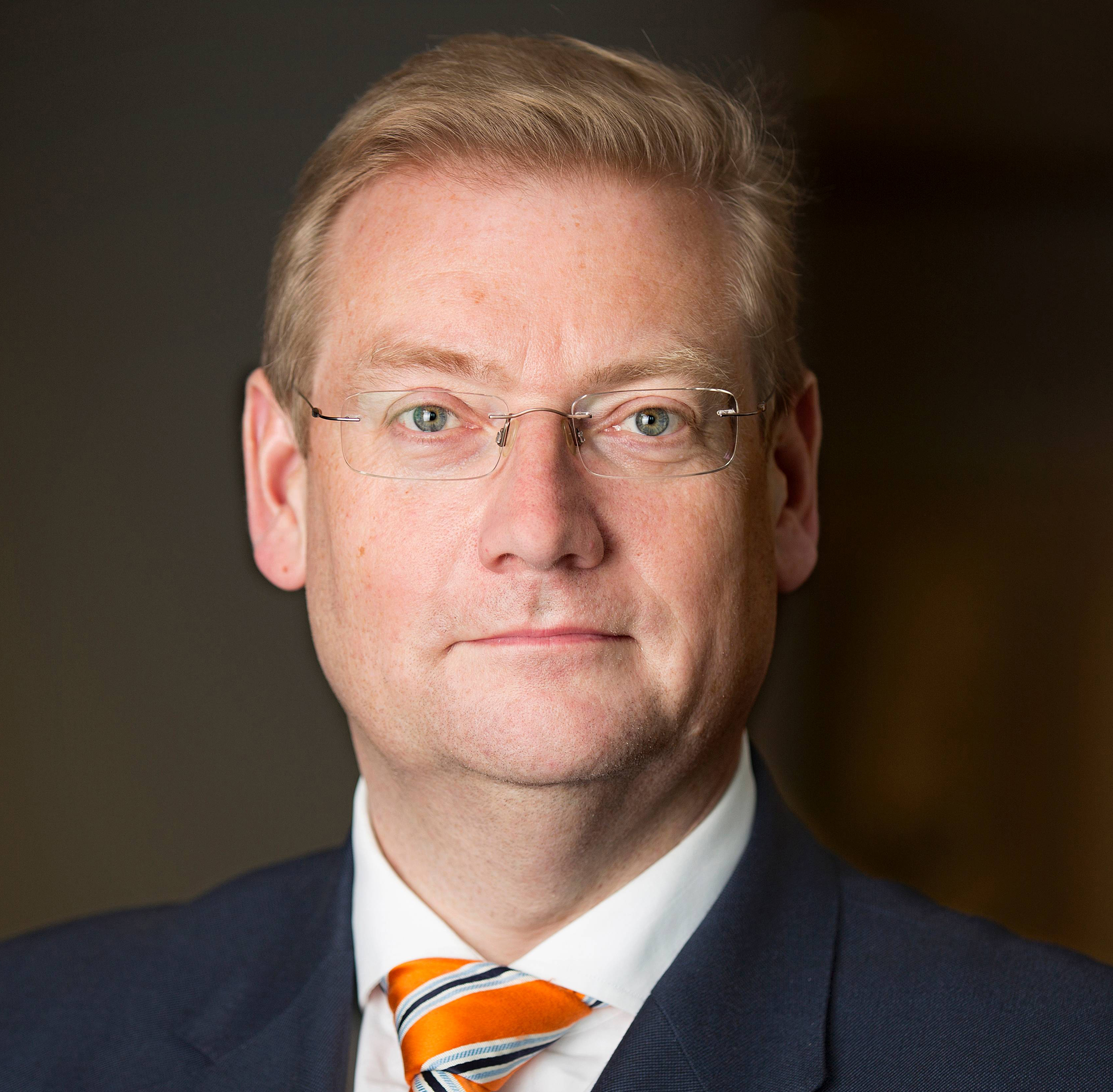
- Van der Steur in 2015

Minister of Security and Justice
- In office 20 March 2015 – 27 January 2017
- Prime Minister: Mark Rutte
- Preceded by: Stef Blok; Ad interim
- Succeeded by: Stef Blok

Member of the House of Representatives
- In office 17 June 2010 – 20 March 2015
- Parliamentary group: People's Party for Freedom and Democracy

Personal details
- Born: Gerard Adriaan van der Steur; 7 October 1969 (age 56) Haarlem, Netherlands
- Party: People's Party for Freedom and Democracy (from 1988)
- Spouses: Josien Roos (m. 1999; div. 2009) Ninette ten Bosch (m. 2016)
- Parent: Ab van der Steur (1938–2012) (father)
- Relatives: Ad van der Steur (first uncle once removed)
- Education: Leiden University (Bachelor of Laws, Master of Laws)
- Occupation: Politician · Jurist · Lawyer · Legal educator · Researcher · Businessman · Nonprofit director

Gerard Adriaan "Ard" van der Steur (Dutch pronunciation: [ˈɣeːrɑrt ˈaːdrijaːn ˈɑrt fɑn dər ˈstøːr]; (Note: In isolation, van is pronounced [vɑn].) born 7 October 1969) is a retired Dutch politician of the People's Party for Freedom and Democracy (VVD) and lawyer.

== Early life ==
Gerard Adriaan van der Steur was born on 7 October 1969 in Haarlem in the Province of North Holland as the son of Ab van der Steur (3 May 1938 – 14 November 2012) a tailor and antiquarian bookseller. Van der Steur studied at the Leiden University and received a Bachelor of Laws and a Master of Laws degree in 1995. Van der Steur worked as a lawyer from 1995 until 2010. He was a Legal educator at the Leiden University from 2006 until 2010. He served in the municipal council of Warmond from 2002 until 2006, and of its successor Teylingen from 2006 until 2014. During his period in the municipal council, he chaired his party in both Warmond and Teylingen.

== Politics ==
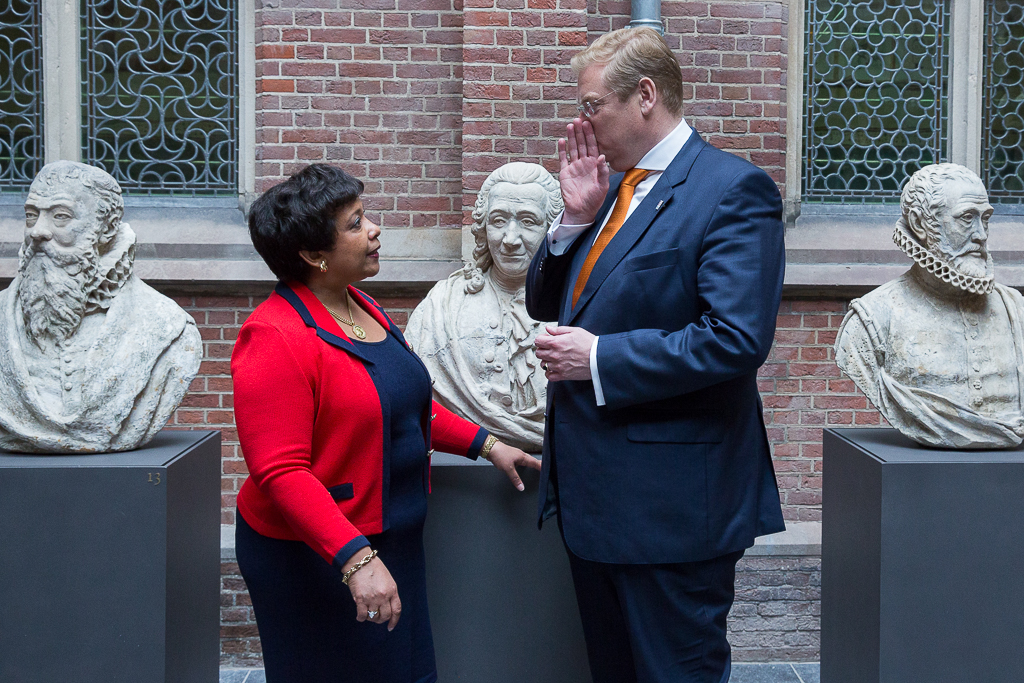
Loretta Lynch and Ard van der Steur at Leiden University, 1 June 2016.

He served as Minister of Security and Justice from 20 March 2015 until 26 January 2017 in the Second Rutte cabinet. As a member of the People's Party for Freedom and Democracy (VVD), he served as a member of the House of Representatives from 2011 until 2015. He focused on matters of civil and criminal law and the judiciary. He was a member of the parliamentary inquiry commission into the high speed train "Fyra" and served as vice-chairman of the standing committee on foreign affairs. He was appointed rapporteur by Parliament for the proposal of the European Commission concerning the European Public Prosecutors Office (EPPO).

During the 2016 Netherlands European presidency, Van der Steur was the chairman of the Justice and Home Affairs council. During his presidency the council decided amongst others on the data protection regulation, the roadmap for better cooperation in the fight against terrorism and the firearms directive.

In late 2016, Van der Steur and Rutte came under criticism from opposition lawmakers who accused them of withholding information relating to a settlement prosecutors struck with a drug dealer in 2000. On 26 January 2017, shortly ahead of the national elections, Van der Steur told the States General he would step down. This way he avoided a vote of no confidence.

Van der Steur studied law at Leiden University. After graduating from Leiden University, Van der Steur started working as a lawyer at NautaDutilh. In 2005, Van der Steur became a partner at NautaDutilh. He functioned as a part-time lector of the Moot Court department at his alma mater's law school from 2006 to 2010. Van der Steur co-founded the law firm Legaltree in 2008 of which he became director in 2018. He is now also active as chairman of the supervisory board of Rijksmuseum Slot Loevestein, member of the supervisory board of Slachtofferhulp Nederland (Dutch victim support) and supports several charities.

Van der Steur was an active debater and won the Dutch national debating championships and several other debating tournaments. He competed in the universities World and European championships. He took part in a debate at the Oxford Union on punitive justice in November 2018.

== Notes ==
Political offices
Preceded by Stef Blok; Ad interim	Minister of Security and Justice; 2015–2017	Succeeded by Stef Blok
