= Credit broker =

In business and law, a credit broker is a company or individual that deals in brokerage of consumer credit. Essentially a credit broker links somebody looking for consumer credit, a debtor, with a company or individual willing to provide it, a creditor, normally for a commission. Credit brokers include mortgage brokers and loan brokers. The commission normally comes from the individual or institution offering credit, and the broker is therefore not entirely objective. Some credit brokers also levy a separate charge on the person looking for credit, without the knowledge of the offering institution.

In British law, credit brokers are covered by the Consumer Credit Act 1974 and the Consumer Credit Act 2006, which defines a credit broker not just as a mortgage or loan broker, but also as a vast range of other intermediary bodies such as car dealers, shops that introduce customers to financial houses for hire-purchase agreements and solicitors who negotiate advances for non-corporate clients. Under the 1974 Act, such businesses require licenses from the Office of Fair Trading. If the business is unlicensed, any agreements made are considered "tainted". In this situation, agreements are only enforceable with a direct order from the Director General of Fair Trading. In addition, the unlicensed trader also commits a criminal offence. This only comes into effect if enforcement is sought through the courts, however; it has been pointed out that agreements can still run their course regardless of the status of the broker. In certain situations under the 2006 Act, credit brokers become agents of the creditor.

== Bibliography ==
- Goode, R.M. (1978). Consumer credit. brill. ISBN 90-286-0928-8.
- Goode, R.M. (1979). Consumer Credit Act: A Students Guide. Butterworths. ISBN 0-406-21165-5.
- Howells, Geraint (2005). Consumer protection law. Ashgate Publishing, Ltd. ISBN 0-7546-2338-6.
- MacIntyre, Ewan (2008). Business Law (4th ed.). Pearson Education. ISBN 978-1-4058-7294-2.
- Macleod, John (2002). Consumer sales law: the law relating to consumer sales and financing of goods. Routledge. ISBN 1-85941-700-0.
