= Klaus-Heiner Lehne =

German lawyer and politician (born 1957)

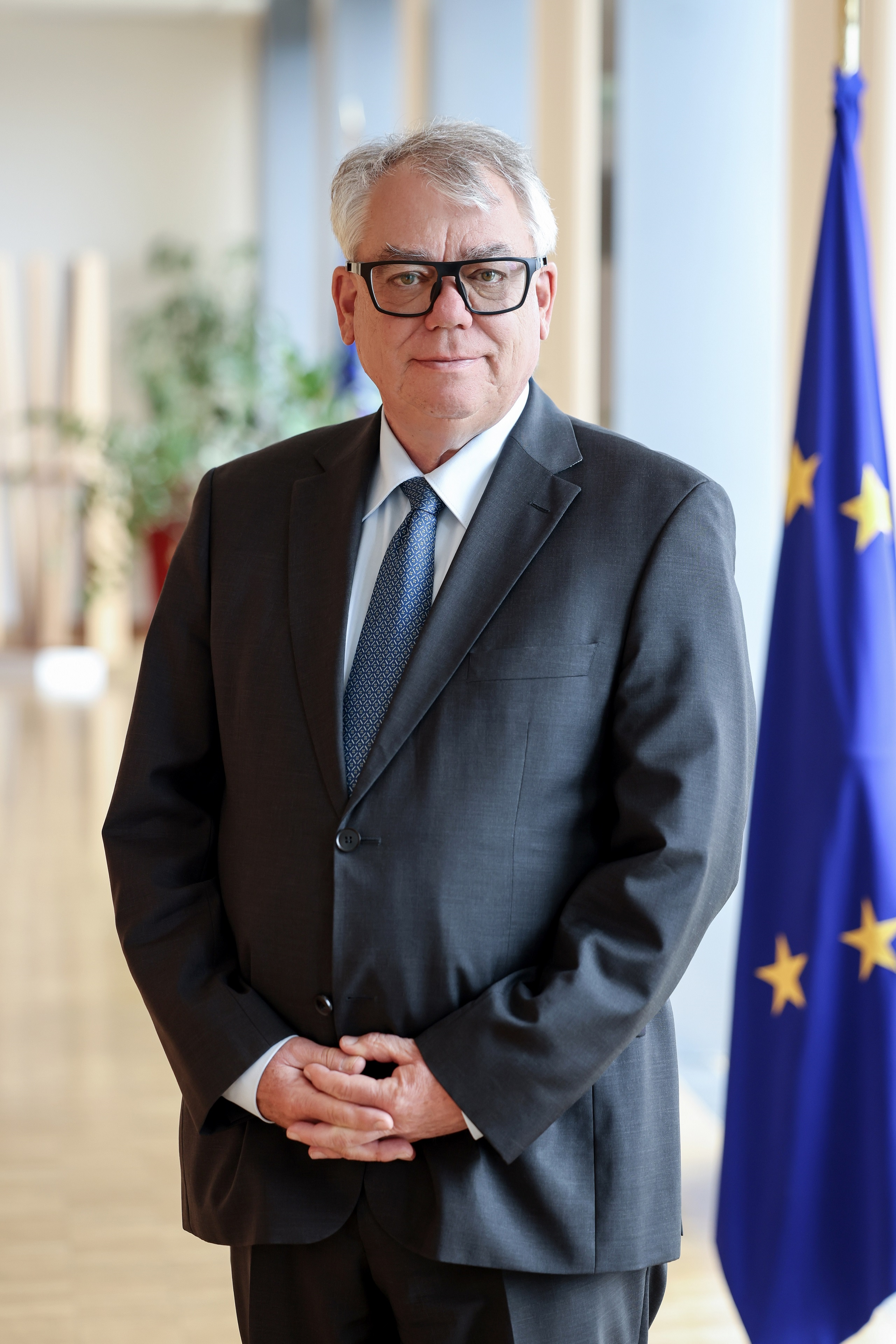

Member of the European Court of Auditors for Germany
- In office 1 March 2014 – 28 February 2026
- Preceded by: Harald Noack
- Succeeded by: Daniel Caspary

President of the European Court of Auditors
- In office 1 October 2016 – 30 September 2022
- Preceded by: Vítor Manuel da Silva Caldeira
- Succeeded by: Tony Murphy

Chair of the Conference of Committee Chairs
- In office 8 September 2009 – 28 February 2014
- Preceded by: Gerardo Galeote Quecedo
- Succeeded by: Jerzy Buzek

Member of the European Parliament for Germany
- In office 19 July 1994 – 28 February 2014

Member of the Bundestag
- In office 12 March 1992 – 10 November 1994

Personal details
- Born: 28 October 1957 (age 68) Düsseldorf, West Germany
- Party: Christian Democratic Union
- Children: 2

Klaus-Heiner Lehne (born 28 October 1957) is a German lawyer and politician who served as member of the European Court of Auditors (ECA) from 2014 to 2026. From 2016 until 2022, he was its 11th President.

Beforehand, he was a member of the European Parliament (MEP) for the Christian Democratic Union (CDU) which is part of the European People's Party political group. In his previous national and European parliamentary career, spanning more than twenty years, he served among other things from 2009 to 2014 as political group coordinator and then Chair of the European Parliament’s Committee on Legal Affairs and concurrently as Chair of the Conference of Committee Chairs.

== Early career ==
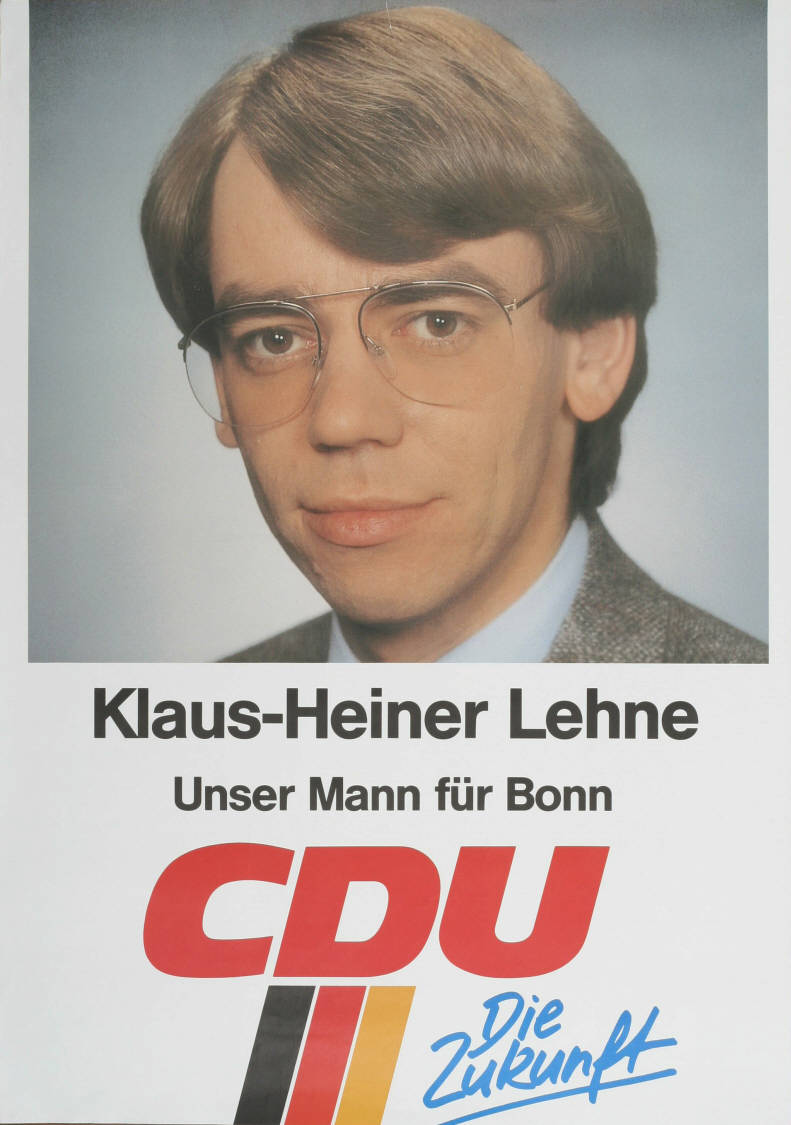
Candidadature poster for the 1987 Bundestag election

After his A levels, Lehne studied law, physics and philosophy at the universities of Freiburg, Cologne, Bonn and Düsseldorf from 1978 to 1986. Following the conclusion of his studies, he took up a position as a lawyer in Düsseldorf.

His brother Olaf Lehne is a member of the Parliament of North Rhine-Westphalia since 2005.

== Political career ==
=== Career in local politics ===
Lehne joined the Christian Democrats when he turned 18, in 1975. He became a member of the City Council of Düsseldorf in 1984.

In 2003, Lehne became the chairman of the CDU Kreisverband Düsseldorf. Upon nomination as Member of the European Court of Auditors in March 2014, he was succeeded in this function by Thomas Jarzombek.

=== Member of the German Parliament, 1992–1994 ===
In 1992, Lehne entered the German Bundestag replacing the deceased Hubert Doppmeier. At the German Bundestag, he was a member of the Transport Committee and the Committee on Legal Affairs. In addition, he took part in the Treuhand Investigative Committee and the SED committee of inquiry.

=== Member of the European Parliament, 1994–2014 ===
In the European Parliament election in 1994, Lehne was elected to become a member of the European Parliament. Between 2009 and 2014, he held the position of chair of the Committee on Legal Affairs and chair of the Conference of Committee Chairs. He was also vice-chair of the interparliamentary delegation for relations with Russia and member of the delegation for relations with Japan.

At the European Parliament, Lehne served as rapporteur for the following EU legislative procedures in the field of company law:

- Takeover-directive
- Merger directive
- Balance directives
- Shareholders’ rights directive
- Statute of the European private company

As a rapporteur for European Contract Law, Lehne supported the preliminary academic work of the so-called Common Frame of Reference, which, as decided by the European Parliament at a resolution in December 2007, would form the basis for an optional instrument. This instrument would give parties involved in cross-border business the option to make use of European contract law instead of national contract law.

Lehne was also rapporteur on the issue of Collective Redress. In his report, he called on cartel victims to be entitled to compensation. However, he argued that this compensation should not follow the example of a claims industry as in the United States.

A complete list of the files for which Lehne was rapporteur is available here for the 7th parliamentary term (2009–2014) and for the 6th parliamentary term (2004–2009).

== European Court of Auditors, 2014–2026 ==
In early 2014, the German government nominated Lehne as the German member of the European Court of Auditors for six years; following a positive opinion by a majority of the European Parliament the Council appointed him as Member. He served in Chamber III, which is responsible for auditing external EU policies. Lehne dealt, among other things, with the development of renewable energy in East Africa, the ACP Investment Facility, EU support for the fight against torture and the abolition of the death penalty.

On 13 September 2016, Lehne was elected President of the European Court of Auditors, becoming its 11th President. Under the Rules of Procedure of the Court of Auditors, the President shall: (a) call and chair meetings of the Court and be responsible for the proper conduct of the sessions; (b) ensure that the Court's decisions are implemented; (c) ensure that the departments of the Court operate properly and that its various activities are soundly managed; (d) appoint an agent to represent the Court in all litigation in which the Court is involved; (e) represent the Court in its external relations, in particular in its relations with the discharge authority, the other institutions of the Union and the Member States’ audit institutions.

On 12 September 2019, he was re-elected for a second term of three years running until 30 September 2022.

On 23 October 2019 he presented the Court Annual Report for the Year 2018 to the European Parliament's plenary session in Strasbourg.

Lehne's term in the court expired on 28 February 2026. Daniel Caspary, also a former MEP, took office the next day.

== Recognition ==
- Federal Cross of Merit (Federal Republic of Germany)
- High State Award of the Republic of Poland
- Honorary chairman of the CDU Düsseldorf
- Doctor Honoris Causa at the Bucharest University of Economic Studies
