= Tony Murphy (auditor) =

Irish accountant

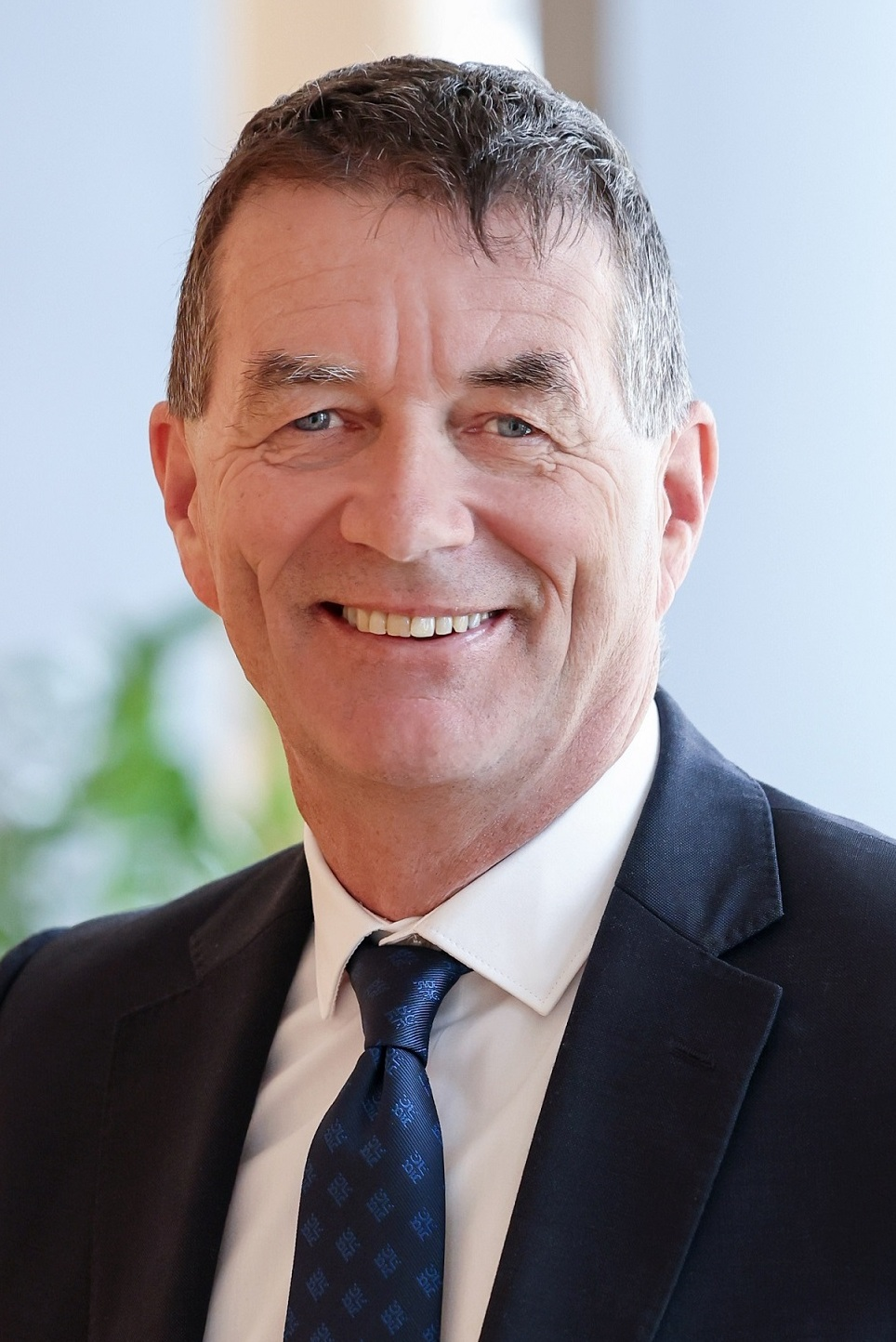
- Murphy in 2023

President of the European Court of Auditors
- Incumbent
- Assumed office 1 October 2022
- Preceded by: Klaus-Heiner Lehne

Member of the European Court of Auditors for Ireland
- Incumbent
- Assumed office 1 May 2018
- President: Klaus-Heiner Lehne; Himself
- Preceded by: Kevin Cardiff

Personal details
- Born: 1 May 1962 (age 63) Dublin
- Occupation: Auditor

Tony Murphy (born 22 May 1962) is an Irish auditor who has served as a member of the European Court of Auditors since 2018, including as its president since 2022.

== Biography ==
He began his career as an auditor in 1979 at the Comptroller and Auditor General of Ireland, where he was Senior Auditor at from 1994 to 1999. In 2008 he was Chairman of the Audit Board at the European Investment Fund. In 2013 he became head of Cabinet of a Court of an Auditor member. From 2017 to 2018 he was Director of the Fourth Chamber of the European Court of Auditors, responsible for Market Regulation and Competitive Economy. He became a member of the European Court of Auditors in 2018 and has been its president since 1 October 2022, replacing Klaus-Heiner Lehne.

He achieved the required majority in the body of 27 members in the second round of voting.

He is the second Irish person to lead a body of the European Union, after Emily O'Reilly, who served as European Ombudsman between 2013 and 2024.
