= Aluminium Bahrain =

Bahraini aluminium manufacturer

Aluminium Bahrain B.S.C.
- Type: Public (since 2010)
- Traded as: BHSE:ALBH; LSE: ALBH
- Industry: Aluminium
- Founded: 1968; 58 years ago
- Headquarters: Askar, Bahrain
- Area served: Worldwide
- Key people: HE Khalid Al Rumaihi (chairman); Ali Al-Baqali (CEO)
- Revenue: ▲$4,313 million (2024)
- Number of employees: 3,179 (2024)
- Website: albasmelter.com

Aluminium Bahrain B.S.C. (trading as Alba) is a Bahraini aluminium producer and smelting company. Alba began operations in 1971 as the first aluminium smelter in the Middle East and the first project of industrial diversification beyond oil in Bahrain. With a capacity of 1.6 million metric tons per year the natural gas powered smelter is one of the largest in the world. Alcoa is Alba's principal long time supplier of alumina, most of which comes from Western Australia.

Alba is a public company with 10% of free float in the hands of the general public and 70% of the stock owned by the Bahrain sovereign wealth fund. The remaining 20% belong to Ma'aden, owner of the smelter in Ras Al-Khair. Alba was ranked 68 in the 2025 Forbes Middle East Top 100. Prior to the Potline 6 expansion project, the aluminum sector contributed 12% to the country's GDP.

Two weeks after the outbreak of the 2026 iran war, Alba executed a partial shutdown due to worries about raw material stockpiles and is currently operating below capacity. It was targeted in a March 2026 attack that caused minor damage.

== History ==
Early investors
Company	May 1971 (Note: May 1971 composition is different from 1968 composition For shareholding changes before 1971, see:)	When sold	January 1977
Bahrain Government	19%		77.9%
(United States) General Cable Corporation	17	1974	
(United States) Kaiser Aluminum Bahrain	17	1989	17
British Metals Corp Ltd	17	1975	
(Sweden) Aktiebolaget Elektrokoppar	12	1975	
(Germany) (United Kingdom) Breton Investments	9.5	1972	5.1
Calpurnia N.V.	8.5	1976	

Initial Operations
Year	Production	Pots (year end)	
1971	not stated		
1972	68.4	339	
1973	102.6	421	Construction work ended May 1973.
1974	118.0	444	
1975	116.4	424	rectifier fire in November 1975 disabled 1 potline for a month
1976	122.1	446	production at planned capacity was achieved in March 1976
1977	124.1		
1978	123.1		
1979	127.1		
1980	126.1		
1981	142.0		
1982	171.0		
1983	171.7		
1984	175.8		
1985	175.5		
1986	176.6		
1987	182.0		

First 5 potlines in 2010
Potline	Since	Type	Pots	Kiloamps	kwh / ton	tpa
1	1971	Alumix-Montecatini	228	125	14,800	78,000
2	1971	Alumix-Montecatini	228	125	14,880	78,000
3	1981	Kaiser	304	138	14,800	115,000
4	1992	AP-30	288	338	12,950	271,000
5	2005	AP-30	336	345; 2021: 400	12,990	323,000
6	2019	EGA DX+ Ultra	424	2019: 460; 2021: 476; 2023: 478	12,870	2019: 540,000; 2023: 560,000

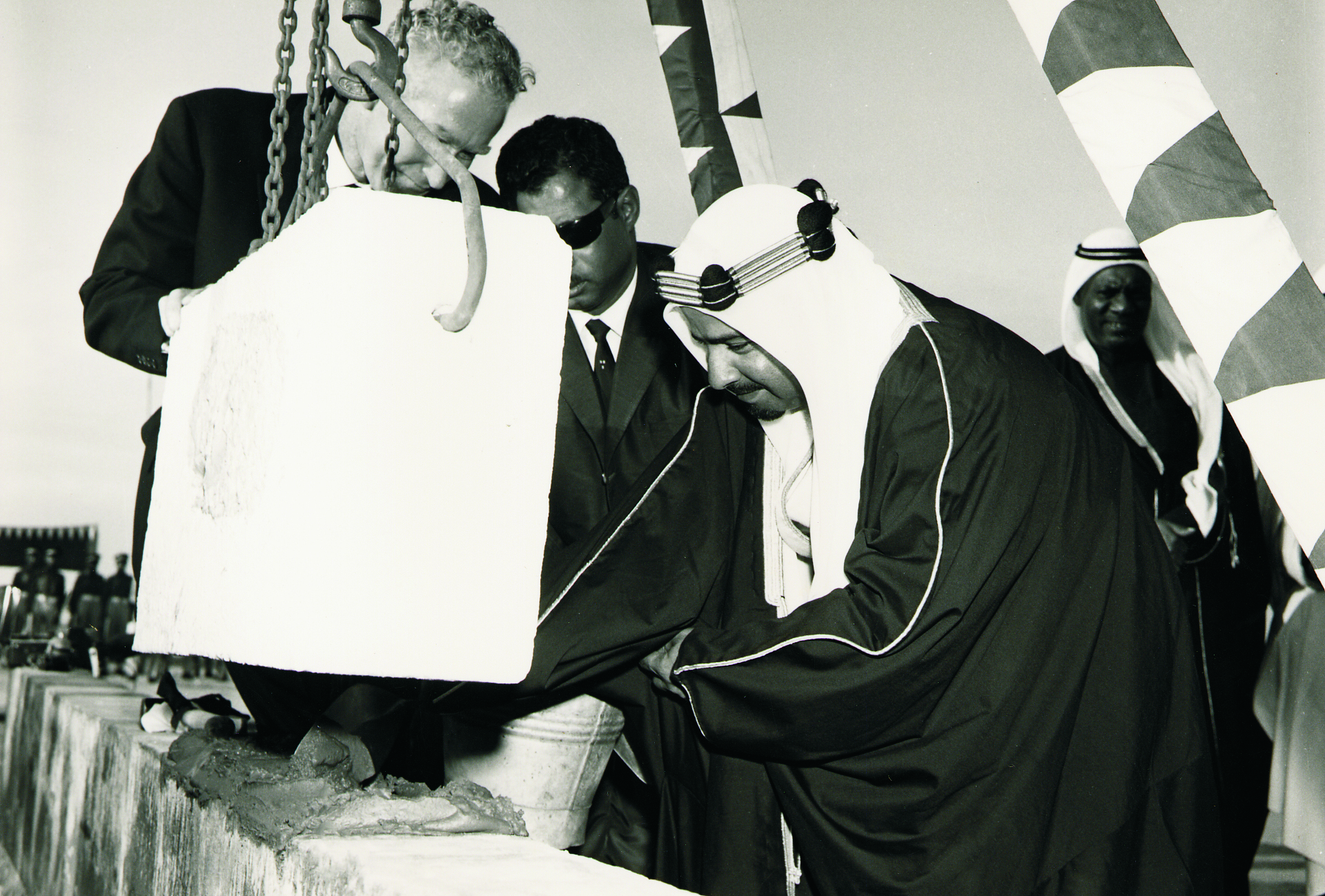
The Foundation Stone was laid by the late Amir Shaikh Isa bin Salman Al Khalifa on 06 January 1969.

Alba was incorporated in the state of Bahrain on 9 August 1968 by Amiri decree. Construction of the smelter began in 1969, and the company produced its first aluminium on 11 May 1971 with an initial capacity of 120,000 metric tonnes per year. During the following decades, Alba expanded its production base by commissioning Reduction Line 3 in 1981, Reduction Line 4 and Power Station 3 in 1992, a coke calciner in 2002, and Reduction Line 5 in 2005, which increased total capacity to more than 830,000 metric tonnes per year. The plant grew westward, each potline consists of 2 elongated buildings. The shorter the building, the older the potline.

Bahrain Atomisers International was founded in 1972 (51% government, 49% Breton Investments). The plant was inaugurated on 1 May 1973. Aluminum powder production was doubled to 6,000 tonnes in 1980. Aluminum was received in molten form, blown through tiny nozzles into powders ranging from 60 to 400 micrometers. Located on the perimeter of the Alba plant (26.0945°N 50.5906°E).

The Bahrain Extrusion Company (Balexco; 100% government) commenced operations in March 1977, with a focus on structural shapes (cladding, doors, window frames, etc.) for the construction industry under a license obtained from Technal International (French architectural aluminum system). The company produced 3,300 short tons in 1981 and 4,200 in 1982. Located in the Sitra industrial zone (26.18065°N 50.6217°E) (balexco.com.bh)

Middle East Aluminium Cables Ltd. (Midal Cables) was incorporated in Bahrain in June 1977. The plant was co-located with the main Alba plant and built between June 1977 and June 1978. Originally a joint venture of Al Zayani Investments Bahrain (family business est. 1977) (51%) and Olex Cables Ltd Australia (49%), the Saudi Cable Company of Jeddah bought a 29% interest in 1982 and the remaining interest of Olex in 1984 and was then a 50-50 shareholder in the venture with Zayani. Aluminum was received in molten form and continuously cast into a rod shape, which was then reduced by a hot rolling mill into a 9.5mm diameter rod, which was then fed into wire drawing machines. In 1992 the company was producing 40,000mtpa of rod and 30,000mtpa of cables and was increasing cable production to 50,000mtpa. (midalcable.com)

The Gulf Aluminium Rolling Mill Company (Garmco) plant $100 million turnkey contract was let to the Japanese Kobe Steel Co in 1983. The 60,000mtpa plant on a 150,000 square meter parcel on Sitra (26.1837°N 50.6143°E) was inaugurated on 19 February 1986. Delivered slabs weighing up to 10 tonnes were first reheated, put through a reversing hot mill and reduced to 5-7mm, then cold rolled to final thicknesses between 0.25-3mm and a maximum strip width of 1525mm, for use in the construction, packaging and general engineering industries. The project was an initiative of the Gulf Organization for Industrial Consulting and its ownership proportions were restructured in 1988. [...] The capacity of the plant in 2023 was 165,000mtpa and Garmco was installing a scrap furnace for the removal of dyes and paint to allow it to process recycled aluminum. (garmco.com)

Since their founding, Garmco and Midal have been Alba's largest customers, accounting for roughly 30-40% of sales (during 2007-2010). At that time, their capacities were Garmco: 165,000mtpa and Midal: 180,000mtpa.

In 1970 Alba entered into a 20 year contract with Alcoa of Australia for delivery of up to 270,000 tons of alumina per year from their jetty in Kwinana (32.19°S 115.772°E), with an option to extend the contract for 10 years at the discretion of Alba. Japanese shipping company Yamashita Shinnihon was contracted to handle transportation until December 1978. In 1990 a new supply agreement was negotiated for 600,000 metric tons per year and was augmented by a 1996 agreement for an additional 285,000. Shipments under this supplementary agreement were the first that were delivered through fraudulent intermediaries. Further supply agreements were negotiated in 2001 and for 10 years starting in 2005, in both arrangements all shipments of Alcoa were made through the intermediary (shell companies of Victor Dahdaleh), who provided no legitimate service other than handling invoices. In 2014 the Securities and Exchange Commission charged Alcoa with violating the Foreign Corrupt Practices Act, that they either knew or were willfully blind to a scheme of bribing Bahraini government officials, amounting to more than $110 million paid over the span of several years, in order to retain the business with Alba, which paid above market prices. Alcoa agreed to settle and pay $175 million in ill-gotten gains and a $209 million criminal fine. Dahdaleh was sued by the UK's Serious Fraud Office and admitted to making the payments, but pleaded not guilty on a defense of "principal's consent" and was acquitted of all eight charges when the SFO case fell apart in December 2013. The principal that consented was ALba's Board of Directors, which confirmed authorizing the payments. Alcoa on 9 October 2012 had also settled a separate US lawsuit and while not admitting liability agreed to pay $85 million and grant discounts on future deliveries, which Alba said brought the amount settled for to $447 million. The suit was originally filed on 27 February 2008, but between March 2008 and November 2011 was on hold pending completion of the U.S. government criminal investigation. The latest extension of the long-term relationship between Alcoa and Alba was made for the 10 years starting in 2026, providing for the delivery of up to 16.5 million metric tons during that period, primarily from sources in Western Australia. 1.92 tonnes of alumina are required to produce 1 tonne of aluminum.

On January 30, 2002 a Technip 450,000tpa coke calciner and associated 41,000 cubic meters per day desalination plant was inaugurated, built under a €220 million turnkey contract closed in 1999. The calciner processed imported green petroleum coke in two 67-meter rotary kilns at temperatures up to 1300°C, to produce the calcinated coke needed for the production of anodes. The 4 desalination lines utilized the waste process heat to produce sweet water. In 2004, the calciner capacity was increased to 550,000tpa and against Alba's requirements of 325,000tpa (2010) allowed for the export of the surplus to other smelters. Alba uses 1.4 tonnes of green coke to produce 1 tonne of calcined coke from which 2.5 tonnes of aluminum can be made. The calciner plant is located off the coast of Sitra (26.1565°N 50.6672°E).

In 2010, Alba completed an initial public offering and obtained a dual listing on the Bahrain Bourse and London Stock Exchange. Some 73 million common shares were sold in London for $174.7 million and some 69 million shares in Bahrain for $164.3 million (142,000,000 shares in total), all previously issued and owned by Mumtalakat, out of a total of 1,420 million shares. Alba became the 43rd Middle Eastern company (excluding Israel) then listed on the LSE with a market capitalization of $3.4 billion. The stock was owned by Bahrain Mumtalakat Holding Co (69.38%), Sabic Industrial Investments Co (20.62%) and the public (10%). Alba became a public company on 23 November 2010. The remaining 3% (42,600,000 shares) of Breton Investments Ltd. had been acquired for $36 million on 24 March 2010 and distributed pro-rata (previous holdings were 77-20-3). Sabic's 20% interest had originally been acquired in July 1979 (57.9, 20, 17[Kaiser], 5.1[Breton]).

In 2015, the company approved its Line 6 Expansion Project, and in 2016 it secured about US$1.5 billion in bank commitments for the project. The 540,000mtpa potline was built by Bechtel and first metal was poured on 13 December 2018. In November 2019, the completed line 6 was inaugurated, which raised Alba's annual production capacity to more than 1.5 million metric tonnes.

In January 2023 Alba announced plans to install 11,300 solar panels (37,000 m^{2}; 9.1 acres) of 6 MW_{peak} (10,539 Mwh per year; 1.2 MW continuous average) on the roofs of its plant pursuant to Bahrain's net zero carbon by 2060 ambition.

In February 2025, Saudi Arabian Mining Company (Ma'aden) completed the acquisition of SABIC's 20.62 percent stake in Alba for SAR 3.6 billion ($960 million). The same year Ma'aden also bought out Alcoa's 25% stake in Ma'aden's own aluminum subsidiaries.

In June 2026, Alba finalised the acquisition for €1.9 billion of Aluminium Dunkerque, one of the largest aluminium producer in Europe.

=== 2026 Iran war ===
Alba executed a controlled shutdown of potlines 1, 2, 3 on 15 March 2026 to ensure steady operation of potlines 4, 5, 6 for longer amidst a projected decline of raw material stockpiles. A limited amount of downtime was to be used productively for maintenance tasks. On 16 September 2026, Alba said it was operating at 80%, bringing in 7,000 tonnes of alumina per day on 300 to 350 truckloads in an "expensive" fallback measure, while routing export shipments through Jeddah and Sohar. Alba requires 1,300,000 / 365 * 1.92 = 6838 tonnes of alumina each day to operate at 80%.

On 28 March 2026, Alba plant was targeted in an Iranian retaliatory attack amid the regional escalation during the 2026 Iran war. According to the company, two employees sustained minor injuries. Islamic Revolutionary Guard Corps later claimed responsibility, and described the strike as part of a broader campaign against Gulf industrial facilities that it said were linked to the United States military supply chain. The minor damage was quickly repaired and was covered by insurance.

== Notes ==
	Originally	1988
Government of Bahrain	20%	25.47%
Saudi Basic Industries Co. (SABIC)	20	20.75
Industrial Bank of Kuwait	20	16.99
Government of Iraq	20	11.32
Government of Qatar	10	5.66
Government of Oman	10	5.66
Gulf Investment Corporation	0	14.15
