= Gulf Summit 1993 =

Gulf Cooperation Council Summit 1993 Gulf Summit 14

- Council flag
- Host country: Saudi Arabia
- Dates: December 20–22, 1993
- Cities: Riyadh
- Participants: Saudi Arabia, Qatar, United Arab Emirates, Oman, Bahrain, Kuwait

The Gulf Cooperation Council Summit of 1993, or Gulf Summit 14, was held on December 20 to 22, 1993 in the city of Riyadh, Saudi Arabia, under the chairmanship of the then King Fahd of Saudi Arabia. The summit reviewed the course of defense cooperation, and the Supreme Council approved the recommendations of the interior ministers on various issues of security cooperation. It expressed its satisfaction with the increase in trade exchanged between the GCC countries. The participant countries also agreed to continue working on bringing policies closer, unifying environmental regulations, and preserving natural resources. The Supreme Council also called for a peace agreement between the Palestine Liberation Organization and Israel in order to achieve a lasting resolution to the Arab–Israeli conflict.

== Participants ==
Country	Representative
Saudi Arabia (host)	King Fahd of Saudi Arabia (chairman of the summit)
United Arab Emirates	Zayed bin Sultan Al Nahyan, President of the United Arab Emirates
Kuwait	Jaber Al-Ahmad Al-Sabah, Emir of Kuwait
Qatar	Khalifa bin Hamad Al Thani, Emir of Qatar
Bahrain	Isa bin Salman Al Khalifa, King of Bahrain
Oman	Qaboos bin Said, Sultan of Oman
	Fahim bin Sultan Al Qasimi, Secretary General of the Gulf Cooperation Council

== Results ==
The summit mainly addressed several diplomatic issues surrounding the gulf region. Saudi Arabia, the host nation, voiced support for United Arab Emirates in its ongoing dispute with Iran over the islands of Abu Musa and Greater and Lesser Tunbs, as well as the United Nations's resolutions concerning Iraq following the Gulf War. The council also approved an increase in defense spending, including purchasing surveillance planes and increasing the size of the defense force.
