= Mohammed bin Ibrahim Al Mutawa =

Bahraini politician (born 1947)

Minister of State
- In office November 2010 – June 2022
- Prime Minister: Khalifa bin Salman Al Khalifa; Salman bin Hamad Al Khalifa

Personal details
- Born: 1947 (age 78–79)
- Education: University of Alexandria

Mohammed bin Ibrahim Al Mutawa (born September 1947) is a Bahraini politician, who served in different cabinet posts for nearly thirty years between 1993 and 2022.

== Early life and education ==
Mutawa was born in September 1947. He received degrees in philosophy, psychology, and social sciences from the University of Alexandria.

== Career ==
In 1972, Mutawa started his career as the head of youth activities at the then-labor and social affairs ministry. In 1974, he began to serve at the prime minister's office. In 1977, he was appointed executive director of the office which he held until 1993. He served as the minister of cabinet affairs from 1993 to 2005. From 26 June 1995 to 2001, he served as the minister of information. In 2001, he was appointed minister of the premier's affairs. From 2002 to 2006, he served as the minister of the cabinet affairs.

Mutawa was appointed cultural affairs advisor to prime minister in 2005. In 2009, he was nominated by Bahrain for the post of the general secretary of the Gulf Cooperation Council while serving as cultural affairs advisor. However, his nomination was not endorsed by Qatar. As a result of Qatar's objection over his nomination, Abdullatif bin Rashid Al Zayani was nominated by Bahrain for the post.

Mutawa was named as state minister for follow-up in 2010. His term ended in June 2022 when a new cabinet was announced by the King of Bahrain Hamad bin Isa Al Khalifa. During his long term in the Bahraini cabinets Mutawa was among the closest and powerful ministers of the former Prime Minister Khalifa bin Salman Al Khalifa.
