= Abdul Rahman bin Hamad Al Attiyah =

Qatari diplomat and former secretary-general of the Gulf Cooperation Council

- عبدالرحمن بن حمد العطية
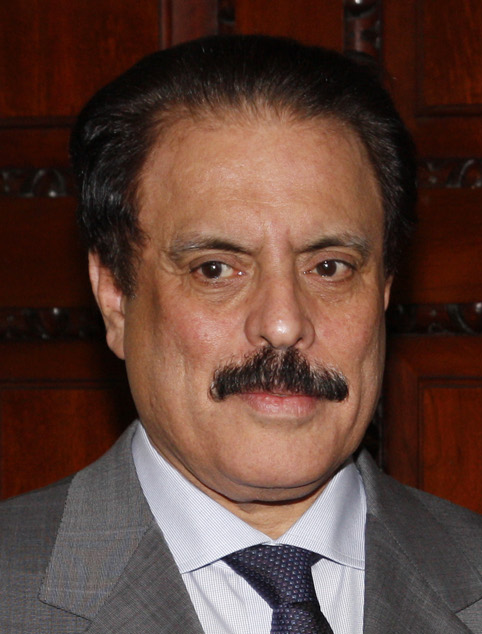
- Attiyah in 2010

Secretary-General of the Gulf Cooperation Council
- In office 1 April 2002 – 1 April 2011
- Preceded by: Jamil Ibrahim Hejailan
- Succeeded by: Abdullatif bin Rashid Al Zayani

Minister of State
- In office 1 December 2001 – 1 April 2011

Personal details
- Born: 15 April 1950 (age 76) Doha, Qatar
- Children: Six (2 boys 4 girls)
- Education: University of Miami

Abdul Rahman bin Hamad Al Attiyah (Arabic: عبد الرحمن بن حمد العطية; born 15 April 1950) is a Qatari diplomat who served as the fourth secretary general of the Gulf Cooperation Council (GCC).

== Early life and education ==
Attiyah was born on 15 April 1950, in Doha, Qatar. He received a bachelor's degree in political science and geography from the University of Miami.

== Career ==
Attiyah started his career in 1972, joining Qatar's Ministry of Foreign Affairs. From 1974 to 1981, he served as the Qatar's consul general in Geneva and ambassador and permanent representative to the United Nations . He also served as Qatar's permanent representativeto the Food and Agriculture Organization (FAO) in Rome. From 1981 to 1984 he was Qatari ambassador to the Kingdom of Saudi Arabia. He served simultaneously as the non-resident ambassador of Qatar to the Republic of Djibouti. From 1984 to 1990, he acted as Qatar's permanent representative to UNESCO. From 1984 to 1992 he served as Qatari ambassador to France. He was the undersecretary of the foreign ministry from 1998 to 2002.

Attiyah also served as the secretary general of the GCC. He was appointed to the post on 1 April 2002. He was succeeded by Abdullatif bin Rashid Al Zayani in the post on 1 April 2011.

After his tenure at the GCC, Qatar announced its intention to nominate Attiyah as Arab League secretary general.
