= Jamil Ibrahim Hejailan =

Saudi Arabian diplomat and politician (born 1927)

Jamil Ibrahim Al-Hejailan
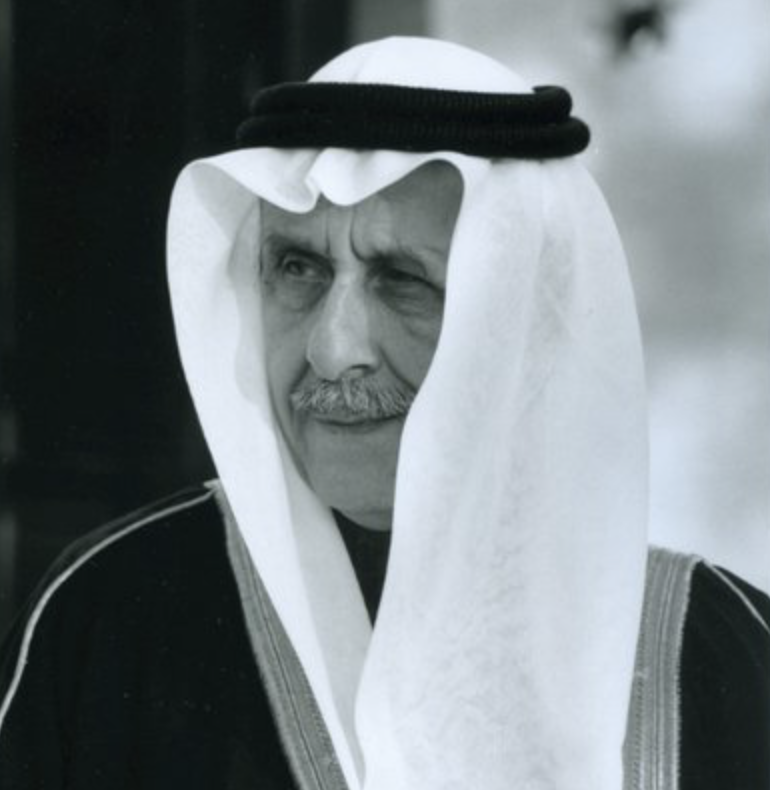

Secretary General of the Gulf Cooperation Council
- In office April 1996 – 31 March 2002
- Preceded by: Fahim bin Sultan Al Qasimi
- Succeeded by: Abdul Rahman bin Hamad Al Attiyah

Minister of Health
- In office December 1970 – March 1974
- Prime Minister: King Faisal

Minister of Information
- In office March 1963 – December 1970
- Prime Minister: King Faisal
- Preceded by: Office established
- Succeeded by: Ibrahim Al Angari

Personal details
- Born: 1927 (age 98–99) Buraidah, Al Qasim
- Children: 4

Jamil Ibrahim Al-Hejailan, also known as Jamil Ibrahim Al Hejailan, (Arabic: جميل بن إبراهيم الحجيلان; born 1927) is a Saudi diplomat, who served as secretary general of the Gulf Cooperation Council (GCC) from 1996 to 2002. He was the ambassador of Saudi Arabia to Germany, Kuwait, and France. Hejailan was the first minister of information and broadcasting of Saudi Arabia and also served as the minister of health.

== Biography ==
Al-Hejailan was born in Buraidah, Al Qasim region, in 1927. He received a degree in law in Cairo. He was a career diplomat and started his career at the Ministry of Foreign Affairs. In 1953 he served as the third secretary at the Embassy of Saudi Arabia in Tehran, Iran. He was the chargé d'affaires at the Saudi Arabian Embassy in Pakistan. In 1960 he was appointed director general of Broadcasting, Press and Publication.

On 5 October 1961, Hejailan began to serve as the ambassador of Saudi Arabia to Kuwait, being the first Saudi Arabian diplomat holding this post. His tenure ended in 1963, and he was named as the minister of information in March 1963 which he held until December 1970. During his tenure Saudi Arabian women first appeared in radio programs. Ibrahim Al Angari replaced Hejailan as minister of information. From December 1970 to March 1974 Hejailan served as the minister of health.

Al-Hejailan was the ambassador of Saudi Arabia to West Germany between 1974 and 1976. He was appointed ambassador of Saudi Arabia to France in 1976 and held the post until 1980s. He was appointed secretary general of the GCC, in April 1996, replacing Fahim bin Sultan Al Qasimi. His tenure lasted until 31 March 2002, and he was succeeded by Abdul Rahman bin Hamad Al Attiyah in the post.

== Personal life ==
Al-Hejailan is married and has four children - Emad, Faisal, Waleed, and Mona. They currently reside in Riyadh and Paris.
