= Abdullatif bin Rashid Al Zayani =

Bahraini engineer and retired lieutenant general (born 1954)

- عبداللطيف بن راشد الزياني
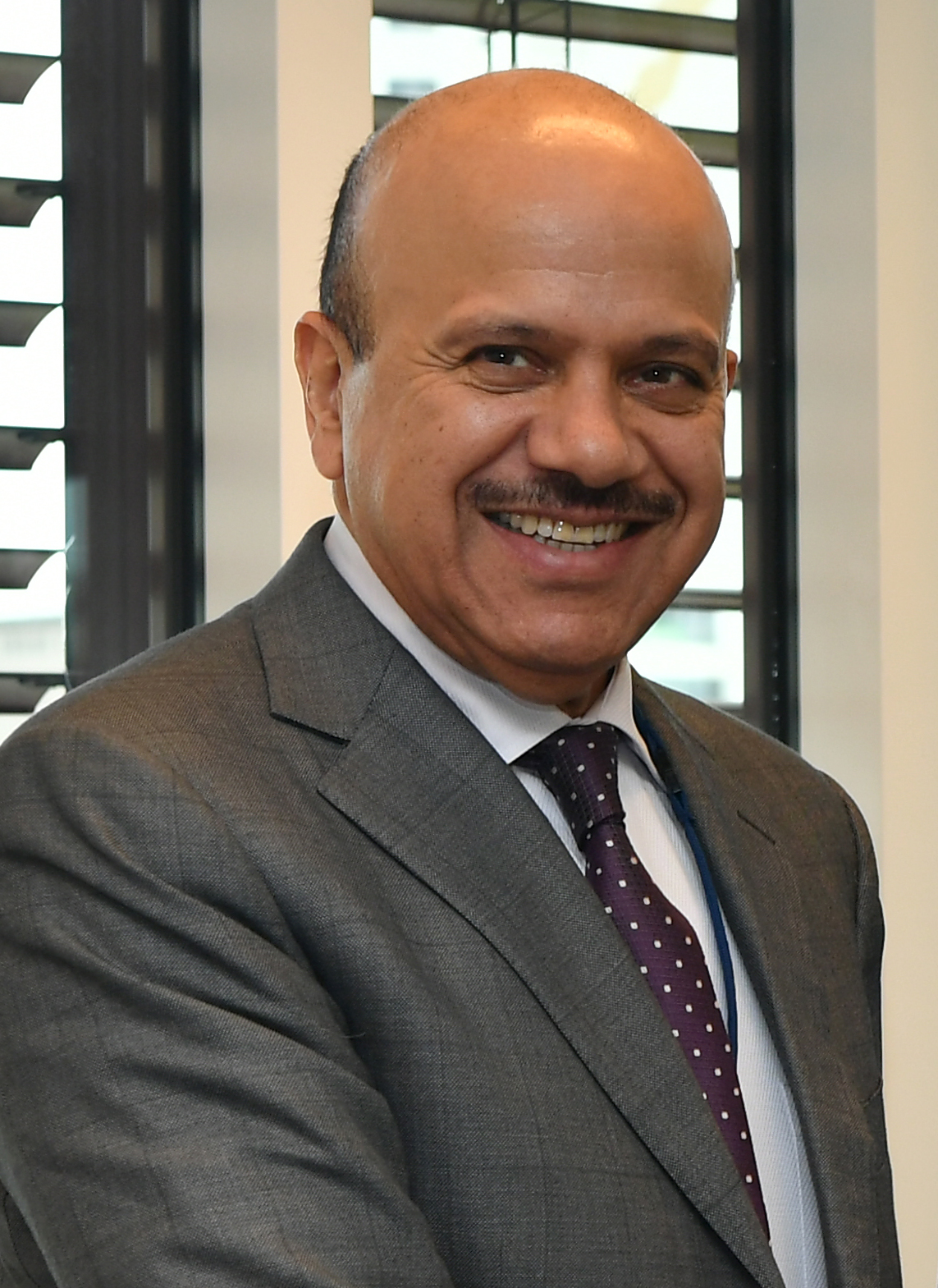
- Zayani in 2019

Minister of Foreign Affairs
- Incumbent
- Assumed office 11 February 2020
- Monarch: Hamad bin Isa Al Khalifa
- Prime Minister: Khalifa bin Salman Al Khalifa; Salman bin Hamad Al Khalifa
- Preceded by: Khalid bin Ahmed Al Khalifa

Secretary-General of the Gulf Cooperation Council
- In office 1 April 2011 – 1 April 2020
- Preceded by: Abdul Rahman bin Hamad Al Attiyah
- Succeeded by: Nayef bin Falah Al-Hajraf

Personal details
- Born: April 15, 1954 (age 72) Muharraq, Kingdom of Bahrain
- Education: Royal Military Academy Sandhurst
- Occupation: Military officer; Aeronautical engineer

Military service
- Allegiance: Bahrain
- Branch/service: Royal Bahraini Army
- Years of service: 1973–2010
- Rank: Lieutenant General

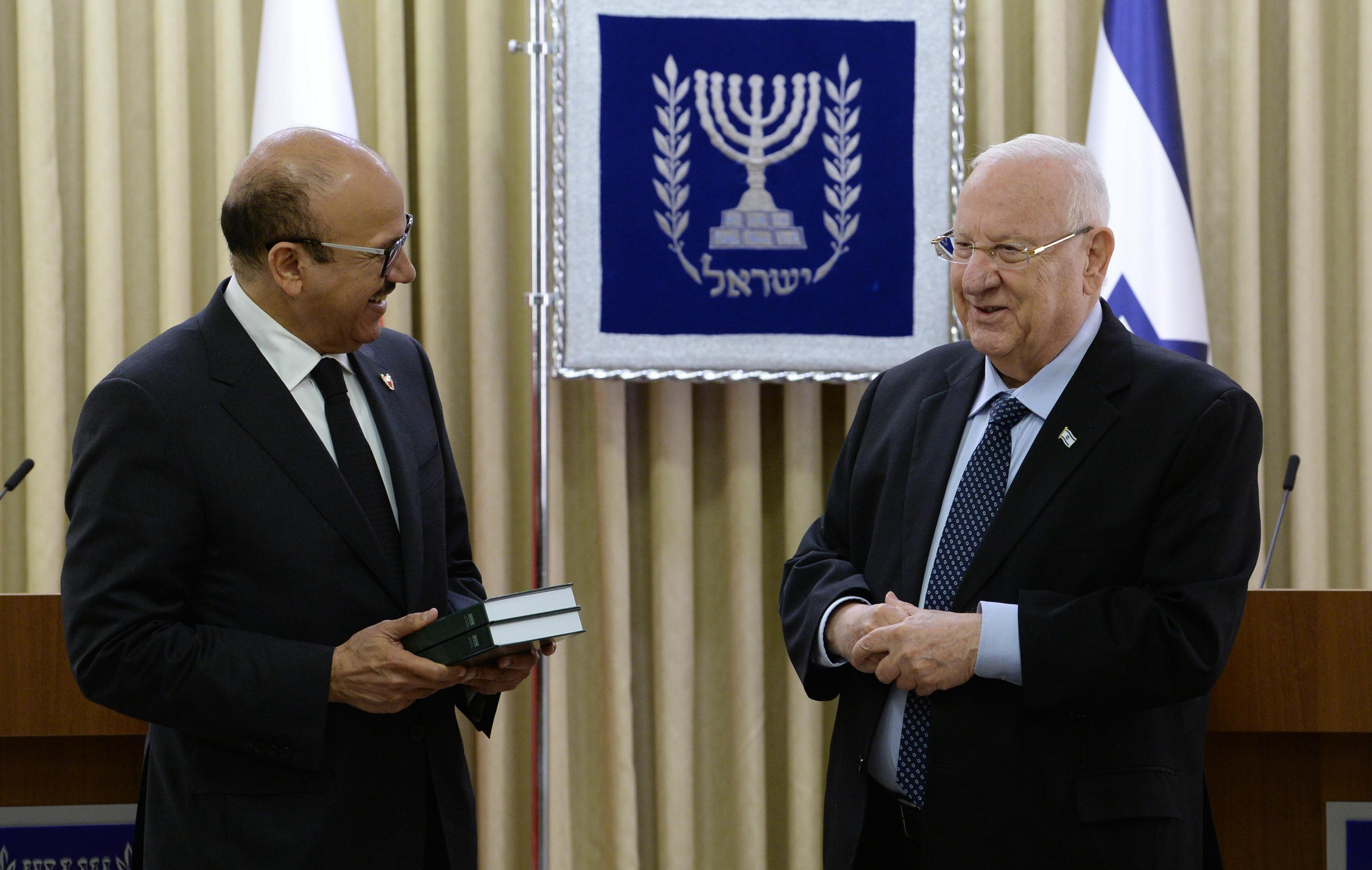
The president of Israel, Reuven Rivlin, meeting with the Foreign Minister of the Kingdom of Bahrain, Abdullatif bin Rashid Al Zayani, Jerusalem, November 2020

Abdullatif bin Rashid Al Zayani (Arabic: عبداللطيف بن راشد الزياني, English; born 15 April 1954) is a Bahraini engineer and retired lieutenant general. He is the foreign minister, having formerly been the secretary general of the Gulf Cooperation Council (GCC) from 1 April 2011 to February 2020.

== Early life and education ==
Zayani was born on 15 April 1954 in Muharraq, Kingdom of Bahrain. He graduated from the Royal Military Academy Sandhurst in the United Kingdom. He is also a graduate of the aeronautical engineering program, Perth Scotland (1978). He received a master's degree in logistics management from the Air Force Institute of Technology in Dayton, Ohio, in 1980. He also received a PhD in operations research from the Naval Postgraduate School, Monterey, California in 1986. He attended command and general staff courses in Fort Leavenworth, Kansas, in 1988 and received the sword of honor along with the title of master logistician from the US Army. Later, he attended leaders in development program at Harvard University in 2008.

== Career ==
Zayani had work experience in Bahraini defence forces, in ministerial posts as well as in university. He became a commissioned officer in the Bahrain Defence Force in 1973. His career at the Bahraini defence forces ended on 2 June 2004. Then he began to serve as the chief of public security as a major general at interior ministry in 2004. He promoted to the rank of lieutenant general in 2010. Next, he was appointed adviser to the minister of foreign affairs in the rank of minister on 10 June 2010. He also worked as a lecturer at Arabian Gulf University, and as mathematics and statistics professor at the University of Maryland in Bahrain, and as a quantitative methods professor at the University of Bahrain.

On 1 April 2011, Zayani was appointed secretary general of the Gulf Cooperation Council. Initially, Bahrain nominated another candidate, Mohammed bin Ibrahim Al Mutawa, for the post. However, due to Qatar's strong objection to him, Zayani was later nominated by Bahrain for the post in May 2010. Zayani replaced Abdul Rahman bin Hamad Al Attiyah in the post. His term ended on 31 March 2020.

In February 2015, following Egyptian airstrikes in Libya, a Qatari Foreign Ministry official, speaking at an Arab League meeting, expressed his government's reservations about Egypt's unilateral military action, adding that it could "give an advantage to one side in the Libyan conflict." Tensions culminated in Qatar recalling its ambassador from Cairo for consultations, and Egypt's Arab League envoy, Tareq Adel, accusing Qatar of "supporting terrorism."

In response, Zayani initially expressed his support for Qatar and criticized Egypt's statements. He described the Egyptian diplomat's remarks as "a false accusation that defies the truth and ignores Qatar's sincere efforts to combat terrorism and extremism at all levels." Hours later, Zayani denied the statement, which was subsequently removed from the GCC website, and expressed his support for the Egyptian government. Bahraini state media reported that "the false statement attributed to Al Zayani" was due to Qatar's control over the website.

In January 2020, he was named as foreign minister, replacing Khalid bin Ahmed Al Khalifa in the post. On 15 September 2020, Zayani signed the official Bahrain–Israel normalization agreement in a signing ceremony at the White House in Washington, D.C.

In May 2023, he visited Kyiv, Ukraine to meet President Volodymyr Zelenskyy during the Russian invasion of Ukraine, becoming the first Bahraini minister of foreign affairs to visit Ukraine since the establishment of diplomatic relations between the two countries in July 1992.
