= Abdullah Bishara =

Kuwaiti diplomat and politician (born 1936)

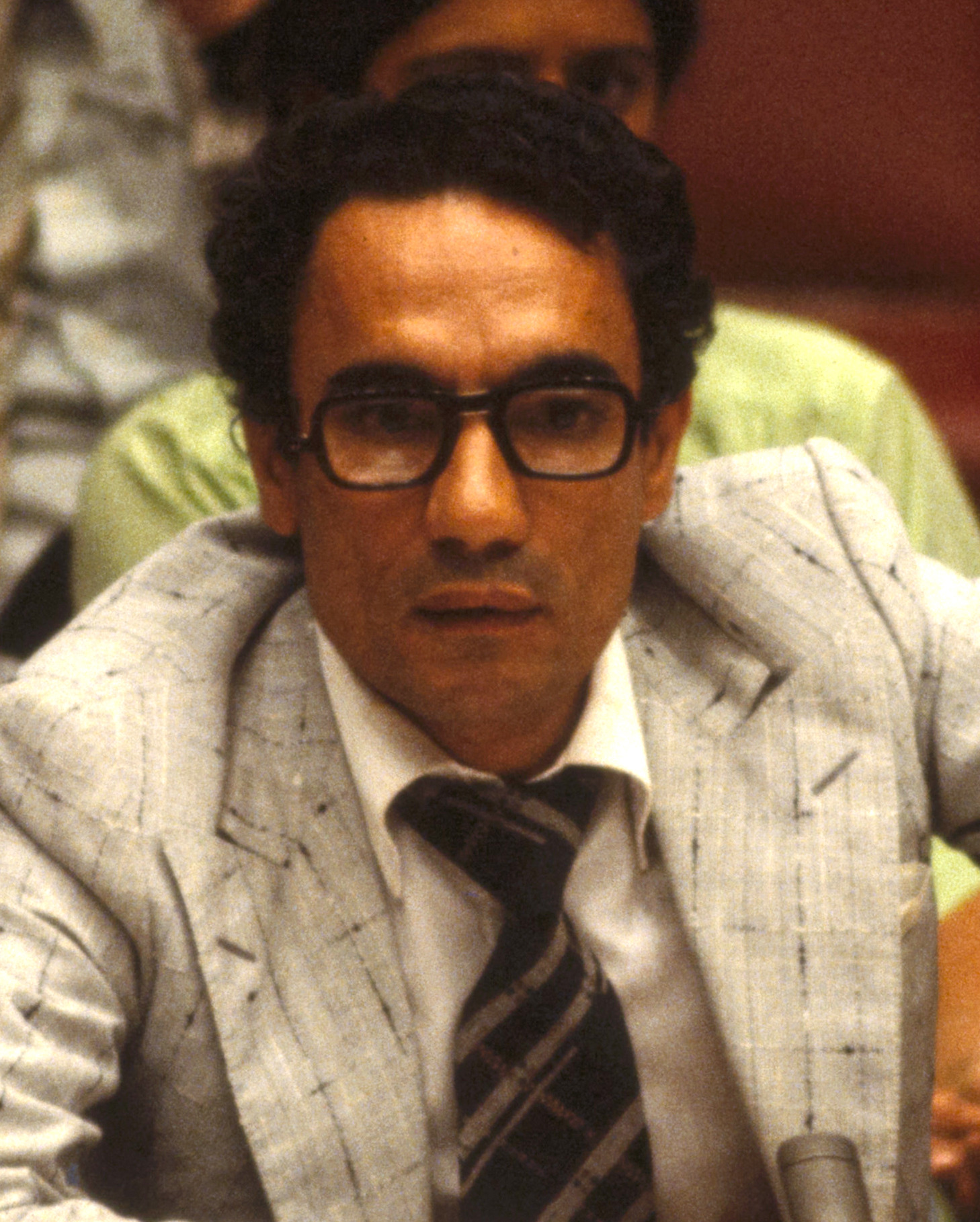
- Bishara in 1974

Secretary-General of the Gulf Cooperation Council
- In office 26 May 1981 – April 1993
- Preceded by: Office established
- Succeeded by: Fahim bin Sultan Qasimi

Personal details
- Born: Abdullah Yacoub Maayouf Bishara; 6 November 1936 (age 89) Kuwait
- Children: 2
- Education: Cairo University; St John's University
- Profession: Diplomat
- Awards: Order of the British Empire

Abdullah Bishara (Arabic: عبد الله بشارة; born 6 November 1936) is a Kuwaiti diplomat and politician, who was the first secretary-general of the Gulf Cooperation Council (GCC).

== Early life and education ==
Bishara was born on 6 November 1936. He graduated from Cairo University in 1959. He attended Balliol College, Oxford University, and studied diplomacy and international relations. Later he earned a master's degree in political science from St. John's University in the United States.

== Career ==
Bishara worked as a teacher from 1959 to 1961. Then he joined foreign ministry and served as second secretary for political affairs at Kuwait's embassy in Tunisia from 1963 to 1964. From 1964 to 1971 he was the director of the office of the minister of foreign affairs in Kuwait. Then he was appointed Kuwait's permanent representative to the United Nations, and served in this post from 1971 to 1981.

Bishara was the first secretary-general of the Gulf Cooperation Council which he held from 26 May 1981 to April 1993. His assistant secretaries at the GCC were Saif bin Hashil Al Maskari from Oman and Abdullah Ibrahim Al Kuwaiz from Saudi Arabia. Maskari was responsible for political affairs while Kuwaiz was in charge of economic matters. Bishara resigned from office in the late 1992, and his resignation was accepted at the GCC summit held in Abu Dhabi in December 1992. An Emirati diplomat Fahim bin Sultan Al Qasimi replaced him as secretary-general of the GCC.

In 1997, Bishara retired from civil service. However, at the beginning of the 2000s he served as a senior advisor to Kuwaiti Prime Minister, Sheikh Sabah Al Ahmed. During the same period he was also Kuwait's member on the GCC advisory committee and an advisor in the Gulf affairs department at the ministry of foreign affairs. He was also named president of diplomatic centre for strategic studies. He is the coordinator of the Kuwaiti – British friendship society. In addition, Bishara became a board member and an advisor to North Africa Holding (NorAH) in 2006, and is an Independent Director of Kuwait Projects Co. (Holding) KSC.

== Personal life ==
Bishara is married and has two children. He is the author of various books. He also publishes articles in different newspapers.

=== Awards ===
In June 2003 Bishara was awarded by the United Kingdom Honorary Commander of the Most Excellent Order.
