= Gulf Organization for Industrial Consulting =

Qatari research institute

Gulf Organization for Industrial Consulting (GOIC)
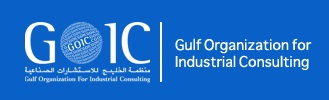
- Type: Government
- Founded: (1976)
- Headquarters: Doha, Qatar
- Area served: GCC
- Key people: Secretary General : H.E. Mr. Ahmed Mohammed Ali Al Mohammed; Assistant Secretary General: H.E. Mr. Shamlan H O Al Jeheidli; Assistant Secretary General: H.E. Dr. Ali Hamed Al – Mulla
- Number of employees: 100
- Website: www.goic.org

The Gulf Organization for Industrial Consulting (GOIC) is a market research organization headquartered in Doha, Qatar whose activities involve preparing economic feasibility studies, researching socio-economic statistics and promoting regional co-ordination between industrial institutions.

== Founding ==
The GOIC was founded in 1976 by the Gulf Cooperation Council (GCC) member states: The United Arab Emirates, Bahrain, Saudi Arabia, Oman, Qatar and Kuwait, and in 2009, Yemen joined the Organization. The Organization is headquartered at Doha, Qatar. The organization chart of GOIC includes the Board members and the General Secretariat. The Board is formed by member state representatives appointed by their governments.

== List of member states ==
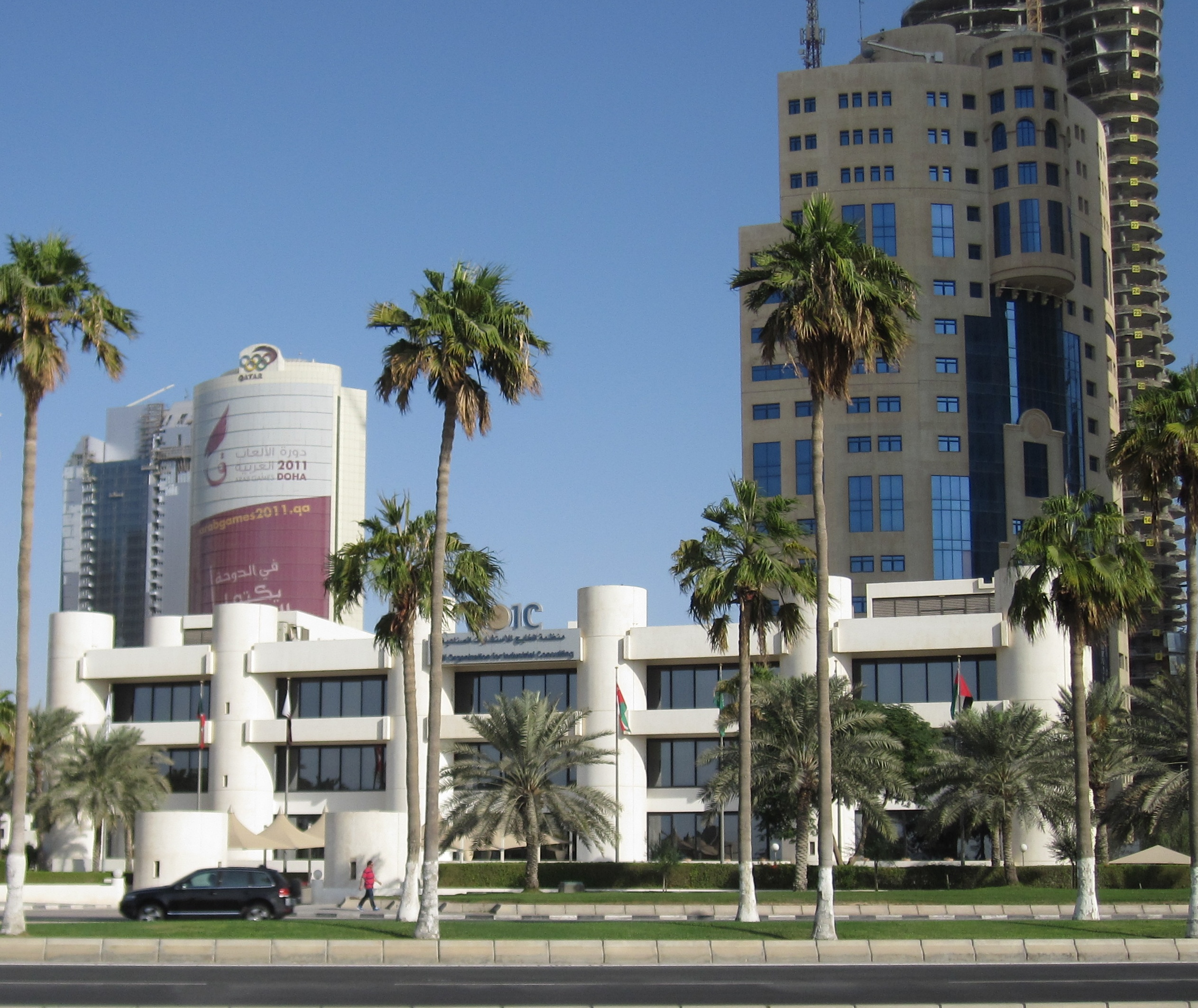
GOIC Headquarters at Doha Qatar.

Flag	Common name	Official name (English)	Official name (Arabic)
(Bahrain)	Bahrain	Kingdom of Bahrain	Mamlakat al-Baḥrayn
(Kuwait)	Kuwait	State of Kuwait	Dawlat al-Kuwayt
(Oman)	Oman	Sultanate of Oman	Salṭanat ʻUmān
(Qatar)	Qatar	State of Qatar	Dawlat Qaṭar
(Saudi Arabia)	Saudi Arabia	Kingdom of Saudi Arabia	al-Mamlaka al-ʻArabiyya as-Suʻūdiyya
(United Arab Emirates)	United Arab Emirates	State of the United Arab Emirates	Dawlat al-Imārāt al-‘Arabīyah al-Muttaḥidah
(Yemen)	Yemen	Republic of Yemen	al-Jumhūriyyah al-Yamaniyyah

Abdullah bin Juma Al – Shibli from the Kingdom of Saudi Arabia is the current observer from Gulf Cooperation Council (GCC).

== Objectives ==
GOIC’s main mission is the identification, evaluation and promotion of joint industrial projects in member states. In addition, the GOIC publishes studies of the state of industries within the GCC, periodicals and maintains a number of useful databases. It also runs a number of training programs and conferences in various industrial subjects. Gulf Industrial Knowledge Centre (GIKC) will provide a unique set of GOIC’s outputs from various industrial studies and industrial investment opportunities, new reports about several industrial sectors. The Sultanate of Oman hosted the 14th GCC Industrialists' Conference under the theme of "Industrial Exports: Opportunities & Challenges" on 2014 March 30 and 31. The 15th Industrialists’ Conference on "FDI in GCC and its impact on industry" will be held in Kuwait for two days from Nov. 25, with the support of Sheikh Sabah Al-Ahmad Al-Jaber Al-Sabah, emir of Kuwait, and the participation of GCC ministers of industry

Trust fund agreement between the United Nations Industrial Development Organization and the Gulf Organization for industrial consulting regarding the implementation of a project entitled "Assistance in strengthening the Gulf Organization for Industrial Consulting, Phase 2:Industrial subcontracting and partnership exchange" signed on 17 February 2006.

Based on the above agreement between United Nations Industrial Development Organization(UNIDO), The Gulf Organization for Industrial Consulting (GOIC) is responsible for executing the subcontracting and partnership exchange program within GCC countries.
