= Gulf Cooperation Council =

Middle East regional union and alliance

Cooperation Council for the Arab States of the Gulf مَجلِس التَّعَاوُن لِدُوَلِ الْخَلِيْجِ الْعَرَبِيَّة (Arabic)
- Flag Emblem

- Map indicating GCC members
- Headquarters: Riyadh, Saudi Arabia
- Official languages: Arabic
- Demonym: Khaleeji
- Membership: Bahrain; Kuwait; Oman; Qatar; Saudi Arabia; United Arab Emirates

Leaders
  - Secretary general: Jasem Mohamed Al-Budaiwi
  - Supreme Council presidency: United Arab Emirates
- Establishment: 25 May 1981; 45 years ago

Area
  - Total: 2,673,108 km^{2} (1,032,093 sq mi)
  - Water (%): 0.6

Population
  - 2023 estimate: 59,620,000 (Note: Sum of component states' 2023 population estimates from the United Nations.) (25th)
  - Density: 22.3/km^{2} (57.8/sq mi)
- GDP (PPP): 2026 estimate
  - Total: ▲$4.906 trillion (9th)
  - Per capita: ▲$78,667 (10th)
- GDP (nominal): 2026 estimate
  - Total: ▲$2.567 trillion (11th)
  - Per capita: ▲$41,161 (32nd)
- Gini (2012): ▼28.7 low inequality
- HDI (2023): ▲0.889 very high (40th)
- Currency: 6 currencies: (ISO 4217 in parentheses); Bahraini Dinar (BHD); Emirati Dirham (AED); Kuwaiti Dinar (KWD); Omani Rial (OMR); Qatari Riyal (QAR); Saudi Riyal (SAR)
- Time zone: UTC+3 to UTC+4
- Website www.gcc-sg.org/en/Pages/default.aspx

The Cooperation Council for the Arab States of the Gulf (Arabic: مَجلِس التَّعَاوُن لِدُوَلِ الْخَلِيْجِ الْعَرَبِيَّة), also known as the Gulf Cooperation Council (GCC; Arabic: مجلس التعاون الخليجي), is a regional, intergovernmental, political, economic union, and military alliance comprising Bahrain, Kuwait, Oman, Qatar, Saudi Arabia, and the United Arab Emirates. The council's main headquarters is located in Riyadh, the capital of Saudi Arabia. The Charter of the GCC was signed on 25 May 1981, formally establishing the institution.

All current member states are monarchies, including three constitutional monarchies (Qatar, Kuwait, and Bahrain), two absolute monarchies (Saudi Arabia and Oman), and one federal monarchy (the United Arab Emirates, which is composed of seven member states, each of which is an absolute monarchy with its own emir). There have been discussions regarding the future membership of Jordan, Morocco, and Yemen. Iraq is the only Gulf Arab state that is not a GCC member.

During the Arab Spring in 2012, Saudi Arabia proposed transforming the Gulf Cooperation Council (GCC) into a 'Gulf Union.' The plan aimed to introduce tighter economic, political, and military coordination, a move considered to be intended to counterbalance Iranian influence in the region. The proposal received support from Bahrain, Kuwait, and Qatar. However, Oman raised objections to the plan. In 2014, Bahraini prime minister Khalifa bin Salman Al Khalifa said that current events in the region highlighted the importance of the proposal. As of the 46th GCC session in late 2025, consultations and efforts on the proposed transition from cooperation to union remained ongoing, with the Council directing that implementation efforts continue. The Unified Military Command (previously known as the Peninsula Shield Force) is the military arm of the GCC, with the aim of coordinating joint defense and security between the six GCC member states, formed in 1984.

== History and founding ==
Sheikh Jaber Al-Ahmad Al-Sabah of Kuwait, alongside the support of Sheikh Zayed bin Sultan Al Nahyan of the UAE, played a crucial role in fostering the idea of closer cooperation among the Arab states of the Persian Gulf, laying the groundwork for the formation of the Gulf Cooperation Council. The members' shared vision for regional unity, security, and economic integration led to the official establishment of the GCC in 1981, strengthening the collective power and influence of the Gulf countries. The charter was signed in Arabic in Abu Dhabi, United Arab Emirates, on 21 Rajab 1401 on the Islamic calendar (corresponding to 25 May 1981 on the Gregorian calendar).

The signatory states on the founding document are the only current members of the GCC. An economic agreement between the countries of the Gulf Cooperation Council was signed on 11 November 1981 in Abu Dhabi, UAE. These countries are often referred to as "the GCC states".

=== Objectives ===
In 2001, the GCC Supreme Council set the following goals:

- Customs union in January 2003.
- Common market by 2007
- Common currency by 2010

Oman announced in December 2006 that it would not be able to meet the 2010 target date for a common currency. Following the announcement that the central bank for the monetary union would be located in Riyadh, Saudi Arabia, rather than in the UAE, they announced their withdrawal from the monetary union project in May 2009. The name Khaleeji has been proposed as a name for this currency. If realized, the GCC monetary union would be the second-largest supranational monetary union in the world, measured by the GDP of the common-currency area, following the Eurozone.

Other stated objectives include:

- Formulating similar regulations in various fields such as religion, finance, trade, customs, tourism, legislation, and administration.
- Fostering scientific and technical progress in industry, mining, agriculture, water, and animal resources.
- Establishing scientific research centers.
- Setting up joint ventures.
- Unified military (Unified Military Command).
- Encouraging cooperation of the private sector.
- Strengthening ties between their people.

President Obama, CIA Director Brennan, and King Salman of Saudi Arabia at the GCC–US Summit in Riyadh on 21 April 2016

The area has some of the fastest-growing economies in the world, mostly due to a boom in oil and natural gas revenues coupled with a building and investment boom backed by decades of saved petroleum revenues. In an effort to build a tax base and economic foundation before the reserves run out, several GCC members have invested in maintaining large sovereign wealth funds to manage petroleum surpluses.

Some notable regional funds include:

1. The Public Investment Fund (PIF) of Saudi Arabia, with US$1.21 trillion in assets
2. The Abu Dhabi Investment Authority (ADIA) of the UAE, with US$1.11 trillion in assets
3. The Kuwait Investment Authority (KIA) of Kuwait, with US$1.002 trillion in assets

The region is an emerging hotspot for events, including the 2006 Asian Games in Doha, Qatar. Doha also submitted an unsuccessful application for the 2016 Summer Olympics. Qatar would later host the 2022 FIFA World Cup. Recovery plans have been criticized for crowding out the private sector, failing to set clear priorities for growth, failing to restore weak consumer and investor confidence, and undermining long-term stability.

=== Logo ===
The logo of the GCC consists of two concentric circles. On the upper part of the larger circle, the phrase Bismillah - "in the name of God" - is written in Arabic, and on the lower part of the circle is written the council's full name. The inner circle contains an embossed hexagonal shape representing the six countries. The inside of the hexagon shows a map encompassing the Arabian Peninsula, on which the areas of the member countries are colored in brown, borderless.

== Economy ==
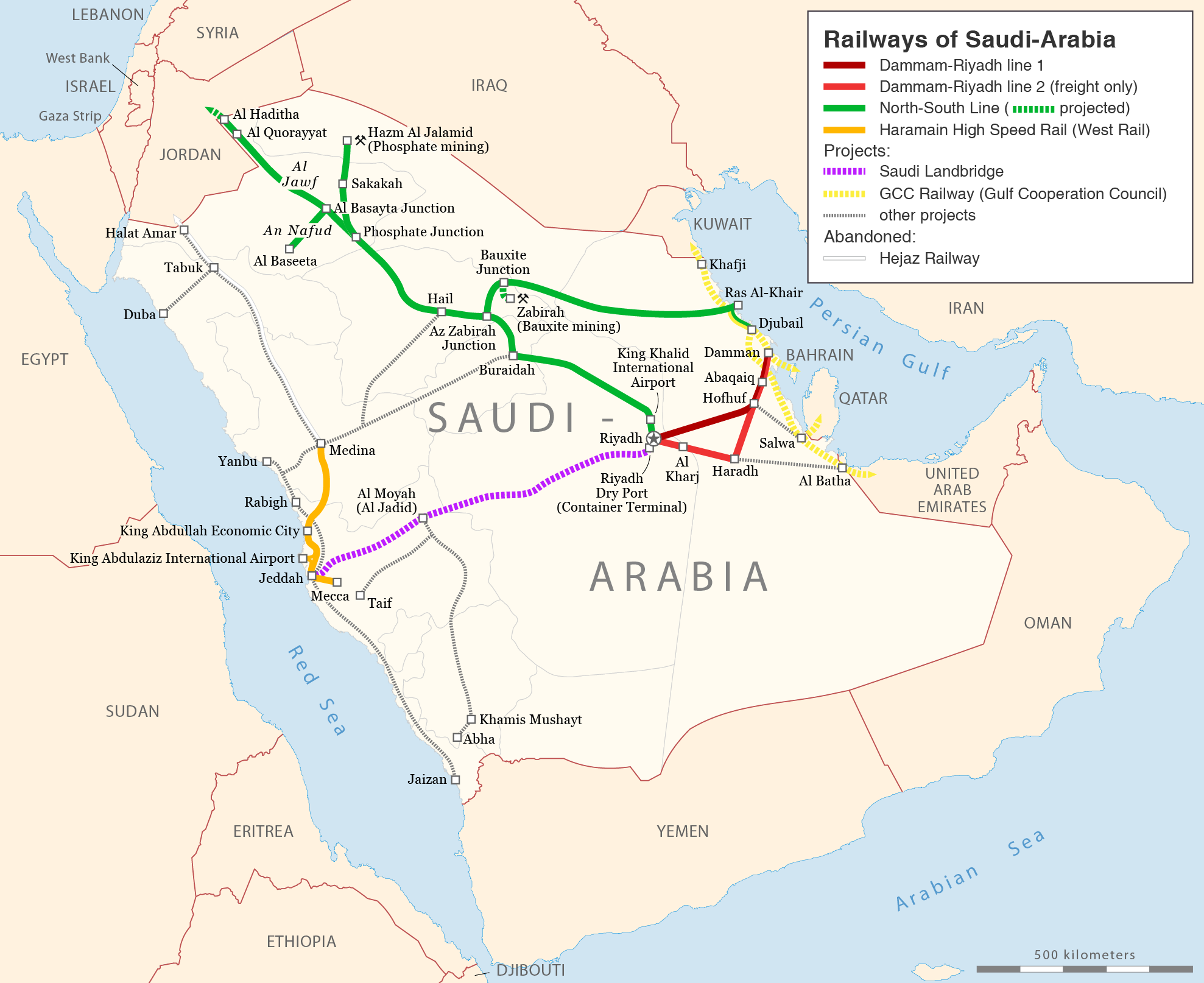
Rail transport map of Saudi Arabia. The GCC Railway, a planned railway system to connect all six GCC member states, can be seen in yellow.

=== Mergers and acquisitions ===
Companies and investors from GCC countries are active in mergers and acquisitions. Since 1999, more than 5,200 transactions with a known value of 573 billion had been announced. Investors include a number of sovereign wealth funds.

=== Internal market ===
A common market was launched on 1 January 2008, easing the movement of goods and services, with plans to create a fully integrated single market. Implementation later lagged behind, after the 2008 financial crisis. The creation of a customs union began in 2003 and was completed and fully operational by 1 January 2015. In January 2015, the common market was also further integrated, covering full equality among GCC citizens to work in government and private sectors, the ability to access social insurance and retirement coverage, real estate ownership rights, capital movement, and access to education, health and other social services, in all member states. However, some barriers remained in the free movement of goods and services. The coordination of taxation systems, accounting standards, and civil legislation is currently in progress. The interoperability of professional qualifications, insurance certificates, and identity documents is also underway.

=== Monetary union ===
In 2014, Bahrain, Kuwait, Qatar, and Saudi Arabia took further steps to create a single, common currency. Plans to introduce a single currency had been drawn up as far back as 2009; however, due to the 2008 financial crisis and political differences, the UAE and Oman withdrew their participation. In 2014, Kuwait's finance minister said the four remaining members would push ahead with monetary union, but said some "technical points" need to be cleared. He added, "A common market and common central bank would also position the GCC as one entity that would have great influence on the international financial system". The implementation of a single currency and the creation of a central bank are areas overseen by the GCC's Monetary Council.

There is currently a degree to which a nominal GCC single currency already exists. Businesses trade using a basket of GCC currencies; this is similar to the way, before the Euro was introduced, that the European Currency Unit (ECU) had been used: as a nominal, common medium of exchange.

=== Infrastructure ===
The GCC launched common economic projects to promote and facilitate integration and to increase resilience. The GCC Interconnection Grid connects the power grids of member states. In 2009, it initiated operations, and by 2013, all six members were connected. A water interconnection project has been discussed, but as of January 2023, there have been no notable developments. Unlike other leading aviation regions like the European Union, members have not agreed to an open skies policy. As such, GCC airlines do not have unlimited market access rights to member states and compete to capture international air traffic flows.

The GCC has also launched major rail projects to connect the peninsula. The railways are expected to fuel intra-regional trade while helping reduce fuel consumption. Over US$200 billion will be invested to develop about 40,000 kilometres (25,000 mi) of rail network across the GCC, according to Oman's Minister of Transport and Communications. According to Ramiz Al Assar, Resident World Bank advisor for the GCC, it will link the six member states as a regional transport corridor, further integrating with the national railway projects, deepening economic, social, and political integration, and it will be developed from a sustainable perspective.

The project, estimated to be worth $15.5 billion, was scheduled to be completed by 2021. As of May 2022, railway construction in the UAE and Saudi Arabia has progressed significantly, but other members' efforts have lagged. Saudi Arabian Railways, Etihad Rail, and their respective national governments have invested 15 billion dollars as of early 2015 into railway infrastructure to create rail networks for transporting freight, connecting cities, and reducing transport times.

== Free trade agreements ==
The Gulf Cooperation Council has free trade agreements with the following countries:

Nation (s)	No of nations represented	Name	Signed	Effective	Coverage	Ref.
European Free Trade Association; Iceland; Liechtenstein; Norway; Switzerland	4	EFTA–Gulf Cooperation Council Free Trade Agreement	22 June 2009	1 July 2014	Goods & Services	
Singapore	1	Gulf Cooperation Council–Singapore Free Trade Agreement	15 December 2008	1 September 2013	Goods & Services	

Signed

- South Korea (Signed 28 December 2023)
- United Kingdom (Signed 20 May 2026) (Gulf Cooperation Council–United Kingdom Free Trade Agreement)

Concluded

- New Zealand (Concluded 31 October 2024)

Negotiations

- Australia (Since July 2007)
- Japan (Since December 2024)
- Malaysia (Since May 2025)
- Turkey (Since March 2024)

== Politics and governance ==
=== Supreme Council ===
The GCC Supreme Council is composed of the heads of state of the member states. It is the highest decision-making entity of the GCC, setting its vision and goals. Decisions on important issues require unanimous approval, while issues on procedural matters require a majority. Each member state has one vote. The presidency rotates based on the Arabic alphabetical order of the names of the member states.

=== Ministerial Council ===
The Ministerial Council is composed of the Foreign Ministers of all the member states. It convenes every three months. It formulates policies and makes recommendations to promote cooperation and achieve coordination among the member states when implementing ongoing projects. Decisions are submitted in the form of recommendations, which the Supreme Council can approve. The Ministerial Council is also responsible for the preparation of meetings of the Supreme Council and its agenda. The voting procedure in the Ministerial Council is the same as in the Supreme Council.

=== Secretariat General ===
The Secretariat is the executive arm of the Gulf Cooperation Council. It takes decisions within its authority, and implements decisions approved by the Supreme or Ministerial Council. The Secretariat also compiles studies relating to cooperation, coordination, and planning for common actions, and occasionally releases reports regarding the work done by the GCC as a whole and the implementation of its own decisions. The current Secretary-General is Nayef Falah Mubarak Al Hajraf, and his deputies include Abdulaziz Al Auwaishig and Khalifa Alfadhel.

=== Monetary Council ===
On 15 December 2009, Bahrain, Kuwait, Qatar, and Saudi Arabia announced the creation of a Monetary Council to introduce a single currency for the union. The board of the council, which set a timetable and action plan for establishing a central bank and chose a currency regime, met for the first time on 30 March 2010. Kuwaiti foreign minister Mohammad Sabah Al-Sabah said on 8 December 2009 that a single currency may take up to ten years to establish. Oman and the UAE later announced their withdrawal from the proposed currency.

In 2014, major moves were taken to ensure the launch of a single currency. Kuwait's finance minister stated that a currency should be implemented without delay. Negotiations with the UAE and Oman to expand the monetary union were renewed.

=== Patent Office ===
The GCC Patent Office was approved in 1992 and established soon after in Riyadh, Saudi Arabia. Applications are filed and prosecuted in the Arabic language before it and grants patents valid in all GCC member states, but it is a separate office from the Saudi Arabian Patent Office. The first GCC patent was granted in 2002. As of 2013, it employed about 30 patent examiners.

=== Unified Military Command ===
Amidst the Bahraini uprising, Saudi Arabia and the UAE sent ground troops to Bahrain to protect vital infrastructure such as the airport and highway system. Kuwait and Oman refrained from sending troops. Instead, Kuwait sent a navy unit.

The Secretary-General of the GCC strongly endorsed the use of international force in Libya. GCC member states joined coalition efforts to enforce the no-fly zone. In September 2014, GCC members Saudi Arabia, Bahrain, UAE and Qatar, and pending member Jordan commenced air operations against the Islamic State of Iraq and the Levant (ISIL) in Syria. Saudi Arabia and the UAE, however, are among the states that oppose the Muslim Brotherhood in Syria, whereas Qatar has historically supported it. They also pledged other support, including operating training facilities for Syrian rebels in Saudi Arabia, and allowing the use of their airbases by other countries fighting ISIL. Some GCC countries also send some troops to fight the opposition government in Yemen. Since the Arab Spring, the GCC has a Security Pact whereby members coordinate efforts to repress their domestic political opposition.

=== GCC Standardization Organization ===
The GCC Standardization Organization is the standardization organization of the GCC. Yemen is also a member of the GCC Standardization Organization.

=== Gulf Organization for Industrial Consulting ===
The Gulf Organization for Industrial Consulting (GOIC) was founded in 1976 by the six GCC member states; Yemen joined the organization in 2009. It is headquartered in Doha, Qatar. The organization chart of GOIC includes the board members and the General Secretariat. The Board is formed by member state representatives appointed by their governments.

== Secretaries-General ==
No.	Image	Name	Country	Tenure
1		Abdullah Bishara	Kuwait	26 May 1981 – April 1993
2		Fahim bin Sultan Al Qasimi	United Arab Emirates	April 1993 – April 1996
3		Jamil Ibrahim Hejailan	Saudi Arabia	April 1996 – 31 March 2002
4		Abdul Rahman bin Hamad Al Attiyah	Qatar	1 April 2002 – 31 March 2011
5		Abdullatif bin Rashid Al Zayani	Bahrain	1 April 2011 – 31 January 2020
6		Nayef Falah Mubarak Al Hajraf	Kuwait	1 February 2020 – 31 January 2023
7		H.E. Jasem Mohamed AlBudaiwi	Kuwait	1 February 2023 – present

== Member states ==
There are six member states of the union:

Country	Population (2023, United Nations)	Area (km^{2})	GDP (nominal)		GDP (PPP)		HDI	Date joined
Country	Population (2023, United Nations)	Area (km^{2})	(USD million)	Per capita ($)	(Int$ million)	Per capita (Int$)	HDI	Date joined
Bahrain	1,485,010	786.5	48,849	29,569	115,915	70,165	0.899 (very high)	25 May 1981
Oman	4,644,384	309,500	117,176	21,645	247,390	45,698	0.858 (very high)	25 May 1981
Qatar	2,716,391	11,581	217,416	68,138	358,364	112,312	0.886 (very high)	25 May 1981
Saudi Arabia	39,947,025	2,149,690	1,388,676	37,811	2,894,592	78,815	0.900 (very high)	25 May 1981
United Arab Emirates	10,516,871	83,600	621,546	54,214	1,006,293	87,774	0.940 (very high)	25 May 1981
Kuwait	4,310,108	17,818	172,920	33,164	283,133	54,303	0.852 (very high)	25 May 1981
Total/Average	59,619,789	2,572,975.5	2,566,583	40,757	4,905,688	82,283		

=== Associated members ===
The associate membership of Iraq in certain GCC-related institutions was cancelled after the invasion of Kuwait.

Yemen was in negotiations for GCC membership in 2007 and hoped to join by 2016. Yemen is already a member of the GCC Standardization Authority, the Gulf Organization for Industrial Consulting (GOIC), the GCC Auditing and Accounting Authority, the Gulf Radio and TV Authority, the GCC Council of Health Ministers, the GCC Education and Training Bureau, the GCC Council of Labour & and Social Affairs Ministers, and The Gulf Cup Football Tournament. The Council issued directives that all the necessary legal measures be taken, so that Yemen would have the same rights and obligations of GCC member states in those institutions.

== Sports ==
The union has served as a grouping for sports co-operation and competition. The GCC states have an annual meeting of the Youth and Sports Ministers of each state to boost youth and sports initiatives in the region. The promotion of the hosting of international sports events has also served an economic purpose for the union's countries, leading to investment and development in the region.

The GCC Games, a quadrennial multi-sport event, was established by the union and first held in 2011. There are numerous long-running GCC Championships for individual sports, including: the Gulf Cooperation Council Athletics Championships (first held in 1986; youth section from 2000) sailing, basketball, swimming, tennis, gymnastics (senior and youth levels), weightlifting, futsal, snooker, and table tennis.

1. GCC Athletics Championships
2. GCC Swimming Championships
3. GCC Gymnastics Championships
4. GCC Shooting Championships
5. GCC Football Championships
6. GCC Futsal Championships
7. GCC Basketball Championships
8. GCC Handball Championships
9. GCC Volleyball Championships
10. GCC Ice Hockey Championships
11. GCC Badminton Championships
12. GCC Table Tennis Championships
13. GCC Tennis Championships
14. GCC Sailing Championships
15. GCC Rowing Championships
16. GCC Chess Championships
17. GCC Billiards and Snooker Championships
18. GCC Bowling Championships
19. GCC Judo Championships Since 1998
20. GCC Karate Championships
21. GCC Taekwondo Championships
22. GCC Weightlifting Championships

=== Football, futsal, and beach soccer competitions ===
Competition	Year	Champions	Title	Runners-up	Next edition	Dates
Men's national teams
GCC Games Football	2015	Saudi Arabia	1st	Bahrain		
GCC Games Futsal	2022	Kuwait	1st	Saudi Arabia		
GCC Games Beach Socer	2015	Oman	1st	United Arab Emirates		
GCC Youth Games	2024	United Arab Emirates	1st	Oman		
Women's national teams
GCC Games Futsal	2022	Bahrain	2nd	Kuwait		

== 2014 Qatar–Saudi diplomatic conflict ==
Qatar's support for the Muslim Brotherhood across the Middle East-North Africa (MENA) region, Hamas and radical Islamists in Libya, has led to increasing tensions with other Arab states of the Persian Gulf. These tensions came to a head during a March 2014 meeting of the GCC, after which the UAE, Saudi Arabia and Bahrain recalled their ambassadors to Qatar.

Some financial economists have interpreted the 2014 Saudi–Qatari rift as a tangible political sign of a growing economic rivalry between oil and natural gas producers, which could "have deep and long-lasting consequences" beyond the region.

== 2017 Qatar diplomatic crisis ==
On 5 June 2017, Bahrain, Saudi Arabia, the UAE, and Egypt had officially cut diplomatic ties with Qatar. Saudi Arabia said it took the decision to cut diplomatic ties due to Qatar's "embrace of various terrorist and sectarian groups aimed at destabilising the region", including the Muslim Brotherhood, al-Qaeda, ISIL and Iran-supported groups in Saudi Arabia's eastern province of Qatif. Political researcher Islam Hassan viewed this rift as a continuation of Qatar's foreign policy rivalry with Saudi Arabia and the UAE.

In June 2017, Saudi Arabia, the United Arab Emirates, and Bahrain banned Qataris and their businesses. Qataris were not allowed to enter or live in Saudi Arabia, the United Arab Emirates, or Bahrain, unless they had a spouse living there, in which case they were required to carry a visa in order to enter these countries. Qatar Airways aircraft were not allowed to fly over these countries.

On 4 January 2021, Kuwait National TV announced that Saudi Arabia would restore all diplomatic ties with Qatar, reopen air space to Qatari aircraft, and reopen the Qatar–Saudi land border. Later that evening, it was announced that Bahrain, the United Arab Emirates, and Egypt had agreed to restore ties with Qatar. On 4 January 2021, it was made official at the Al-Ula summit, where the blockading countries, along with Qatar, signed an official agreement and ended the rift after three years and seven months.

== GCC and US-GCC Summit meetings ==
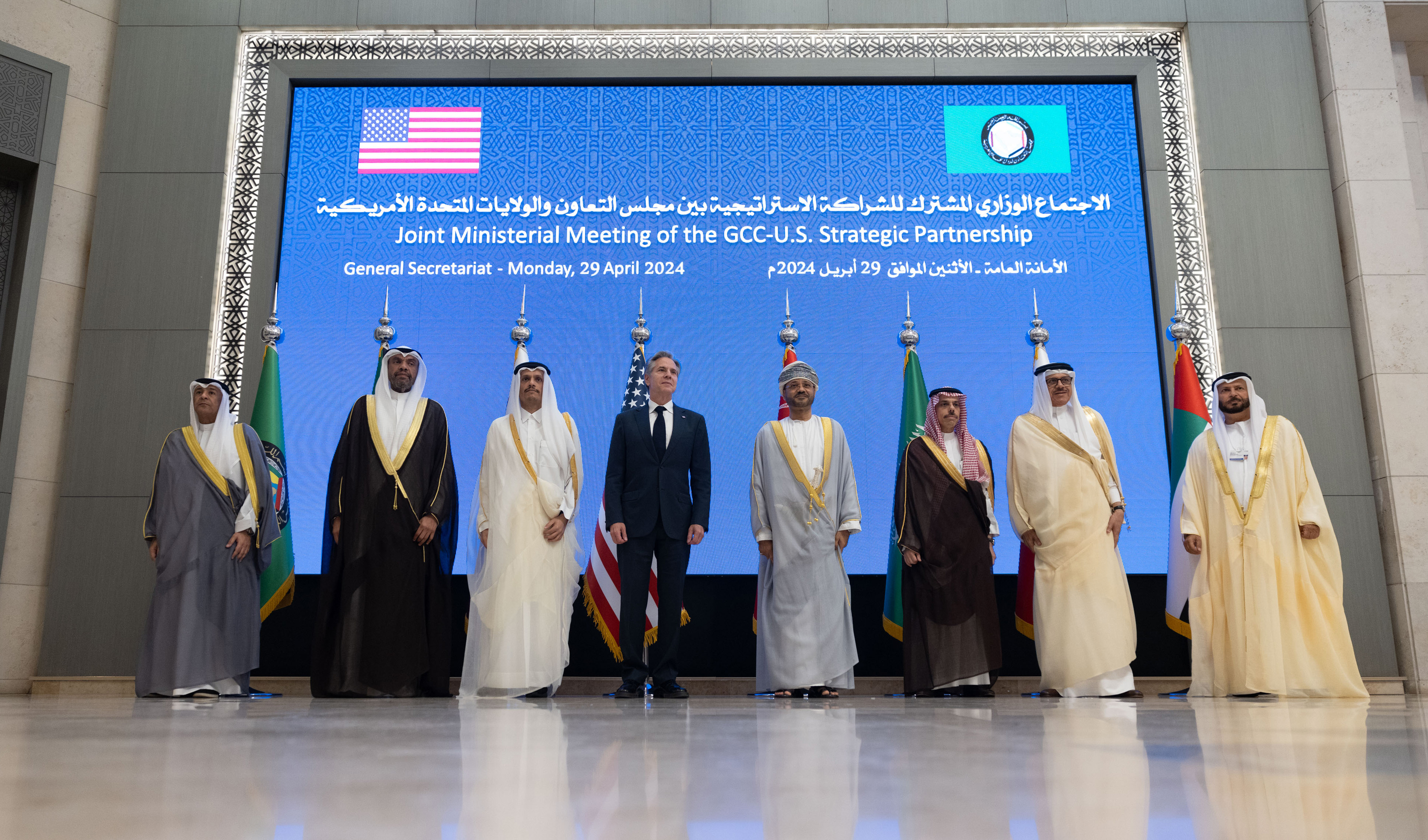
US Secretary of State Antony Blinken and foreign ministers of the GCC member states in Riyadh, Saudi Arabia, 19 April 2024

#	Year	Held in
1	1993	Riyadh, Saudi Arabia

== GCC and Central Asia-GCC Summit meetings ==
#	Year	Held in
1	2023	Jeddah, Saudi Arabia
2	2024	Tashkent or Samarkand, Uzbekistan

== GCC and ASEAN-GCC Summit meetings ==
#	Year	Held in
1	2023	Riyadh, Saudi Arabia

#	Year	Held in
2	2025	Kuala Lumpur, Malaysia

=== GCC—Pakistan relations ===
In January 2022, the GCC and Pakistan finalised the Joint Action Plan for Strategic Dialogue (2022–26). In September 2023, the GCC and Pakistan signed a preliminary deal on a free trade agreement.

=== GCC and EU Summit meetings ===
On 16 October 2024, the first GCC and the European Union summit was held in Brussels, Belgium. It was co-chaired by Charles Michel and the rotating GCC President Sheikh Tamim bin Hamad Al Thani, under the theme "Strategic Partnership for Peace and Prosperity". The Human Rights Watch requested the EU to take advantage of the first summit with Gulf leaders, and challenge the involvement of the UAE and other neighbouring states in the Sudan civil war. The EU director for HRW, Phillippe Dam, said the union leaders should "publicly press" the UAE to stop arms supply to the RSF and push the militia to end the war.

== Related states ==
Euler diagram for the Arab League, which contains members of the Gulf Cooperation Council

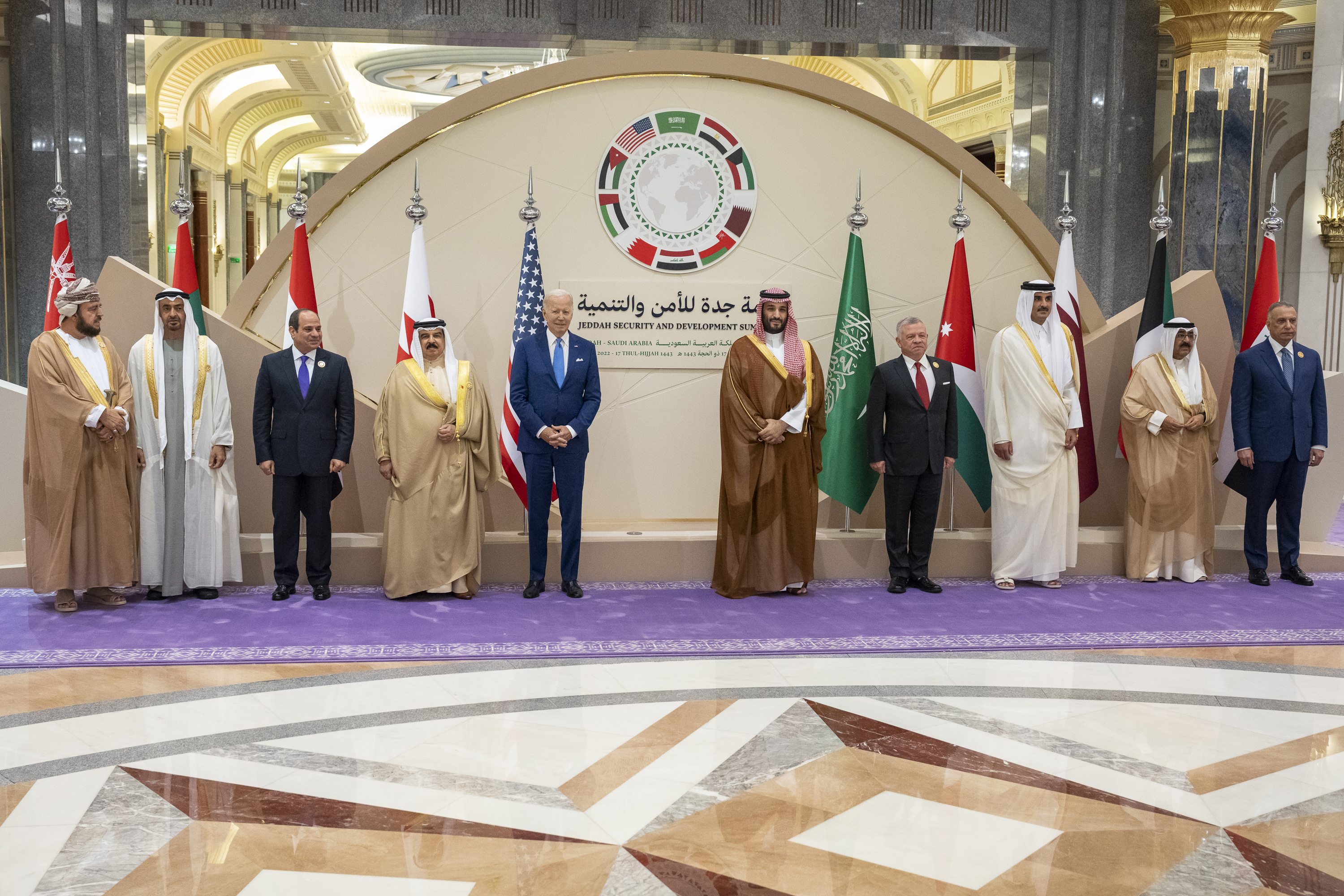
Saudi Crown Prince Mohammed bin Salman with the leaders of Egypt, Iraq, Jordan, the GGC and the United States, at the GCC+3 summit in Jeddah, Saudi Arabia, 16 July 2022

Since the creation of the council in 1981, its membership has not expanded, with all members being Arab monarchies. Some GCC countries have land borders with Iraq, Jordan, or Yemen, and sea borders with Iran, Pakistan, Egypt, Sudan, and Eritrea.

=== Egypt ===
Only the Sinai Peninsula of Egypt lies in the Arabian Peninsula. In 2011, Bahrain's Foreign Minister called for Egypt to be admitted as a member of the GCC.

=== Iraq ===
Iraq, despite having territory in the Arabian Peninsula and bordering the Persian Gulf, is the only Arab country bordering the Gulf that is not a member of the GCC. Despite the societal, political differences between Iraq and its neighboring Gulf states, in 2012, former Iraqi Defence Minister Saadoun al-Dulaimi stated that Iraq wanted to join the GCC. Kuwait supported Iraq joining the GCC, however no progress has been made.

=== Iran ===
At the December 2012 Manama summit, the GCC states called for an end to Iranian interference in their internal affairs.

=== Jordan and Morocco ===
In May 2011, Jordan's request to join the GCC, which had been first submitted 15 years earlier, was accepted, and Morocco was invited to join the union. In September 2011, a five-year economic plan for both countries was put forward after a meeting between the foreign ministers of both countries and those of the GCC states. Although a plan for accession was being looked into, it was noted that there was no timetable for either accession and that discussions would continue.

As Jordan and Morocco are the only two Arabic-speaking monarchies not currently in the council, the current members see them as strong potential allies. Jordan borders Saudi Arabia and is economically connected to the Arab Gulf States. Although Morocco is not near the Persian Gulf, the Moroccan foreign minister Taieb Fassi Fihri notes that "geographical distance is no obstacle to a strong relationship".

=== Yemen ===
Yemen was in negotiations for GCC membership and hoped to join by 2016. Although it has no coastline on the Persian Gulf, Yemen lies in the Arabian Peninsula.

== Related organizations ==
The GCC members and Yemen are also members of the Greater Arab Free Trade Area (GAFTA). However, this is unlikely to affect the agenda of the GCC significantly as it has a more aggressive timetable than GAFTA and is seeking greater integration.

== Gallery ==
=== Heads of State ===
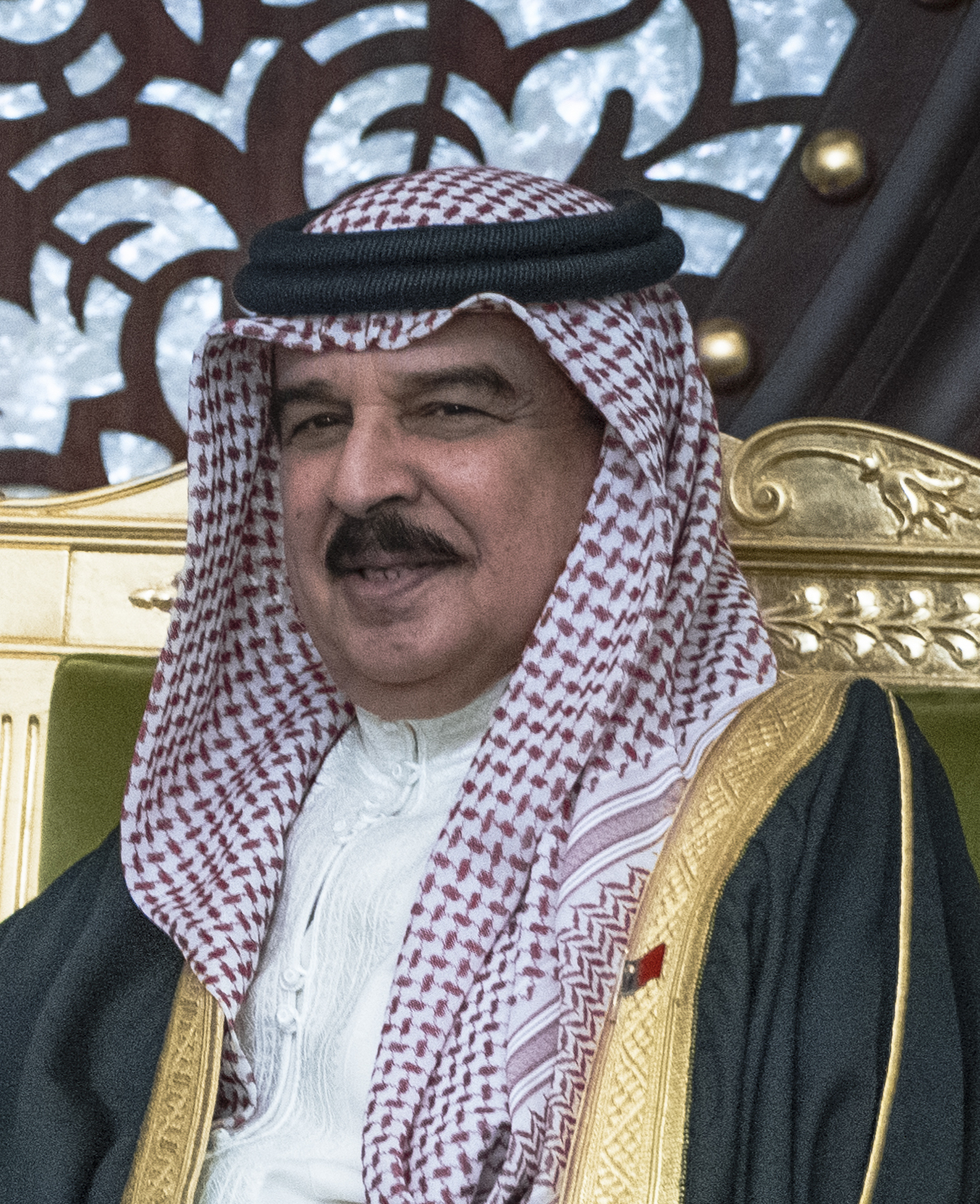
Kingdom of Bahrain
Hamad bin Isa Al Khalifa
King of Bahrain

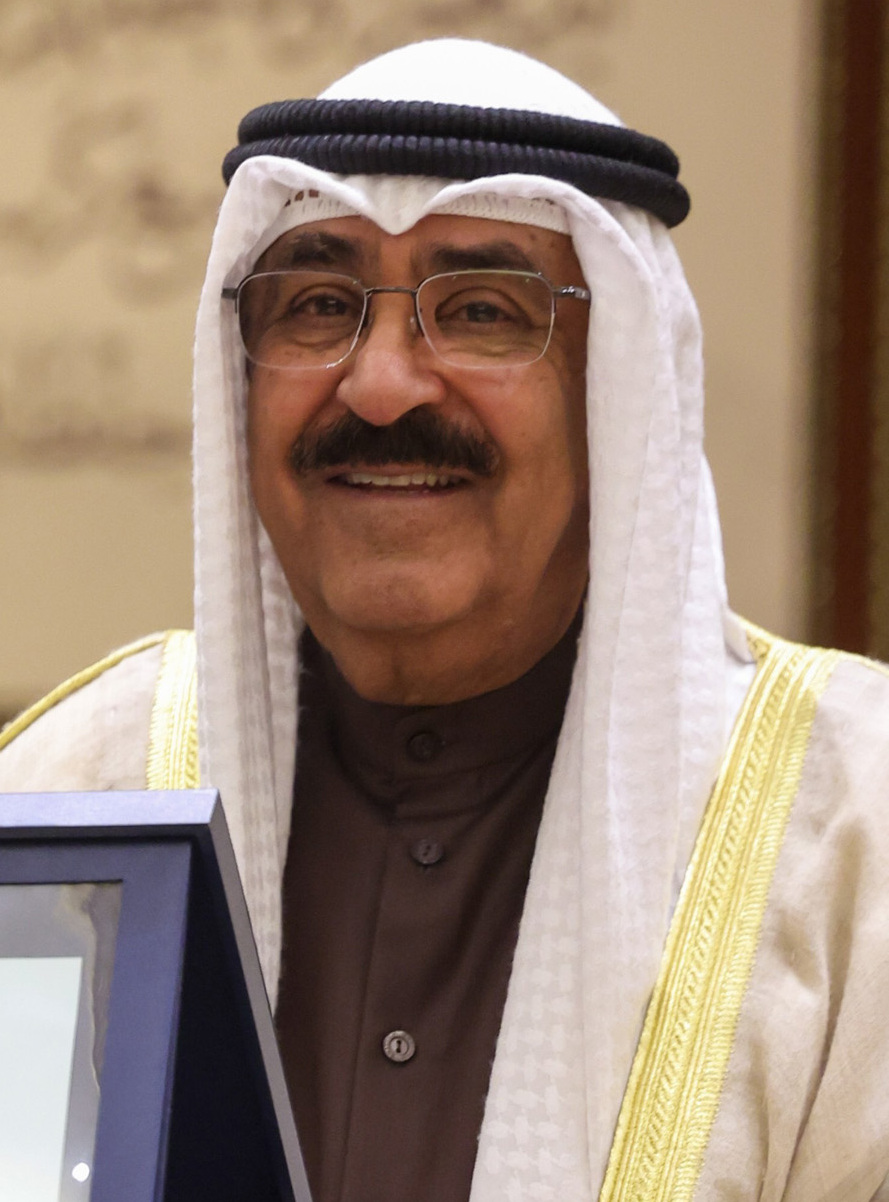
State of Kuwait
Mishal Al-Ahmad Al-Jaber Al-Sabah
Emir of Kuwait

Sultanate of Oman
Haitham bin Tariq Al Said
Sultan of Oman

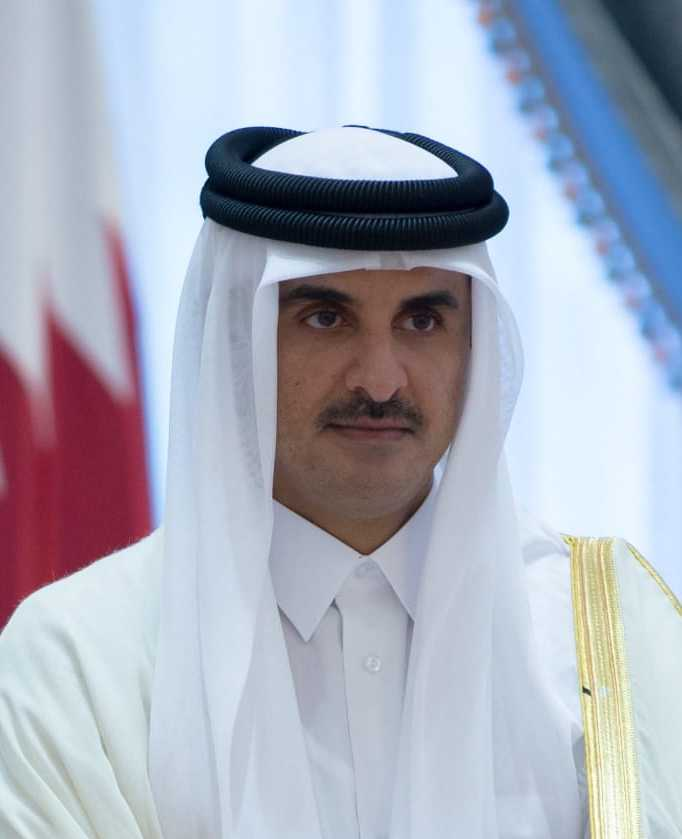
State of Qatar
Tamim bin Hamad Al Thani
Emir of Qatar

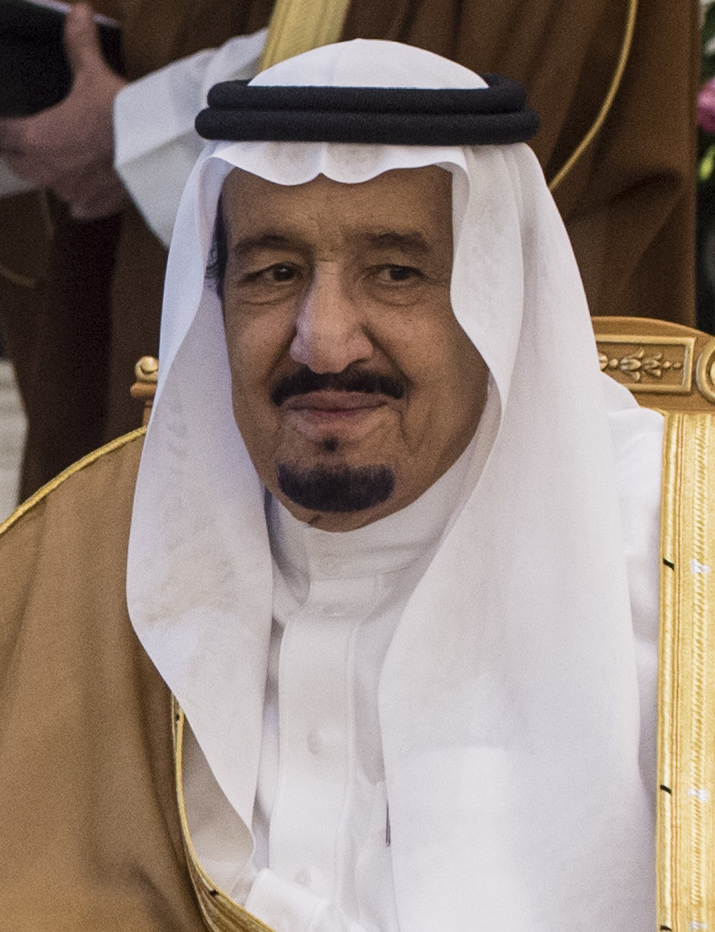
Kingdom of Saudi Arabia
Salman bin Abdulaziz Al Saud
King of Saudi Arabia

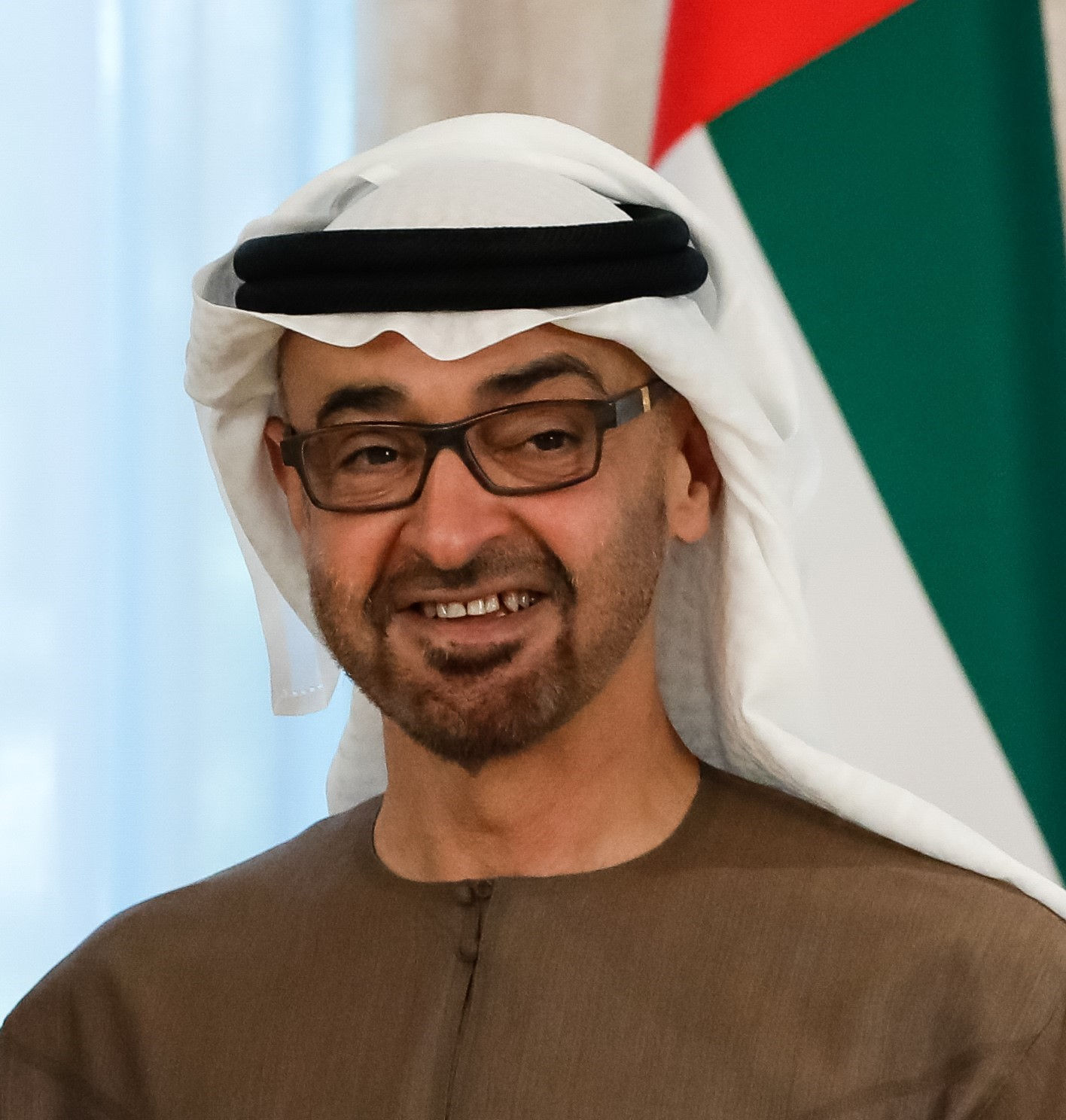
United Arab Emirates
Mohamed bin Zayed Al Nahyan
President of the United Arab Emirates

=== Heads of Government ===
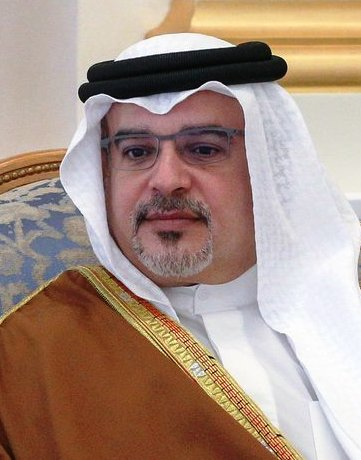
Kingdom of Bahrain
Salman bin Hamad Al Khalifa
Prime Minister of Bahrain

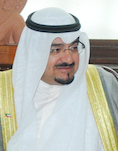
State of Kuwait
Ahmad Al-Abdullah Al-Sabah
Prime Minister of Kuwait

Sultanate of Oman
Haitham bin Tariq Al Said
Prime Minister of Oman

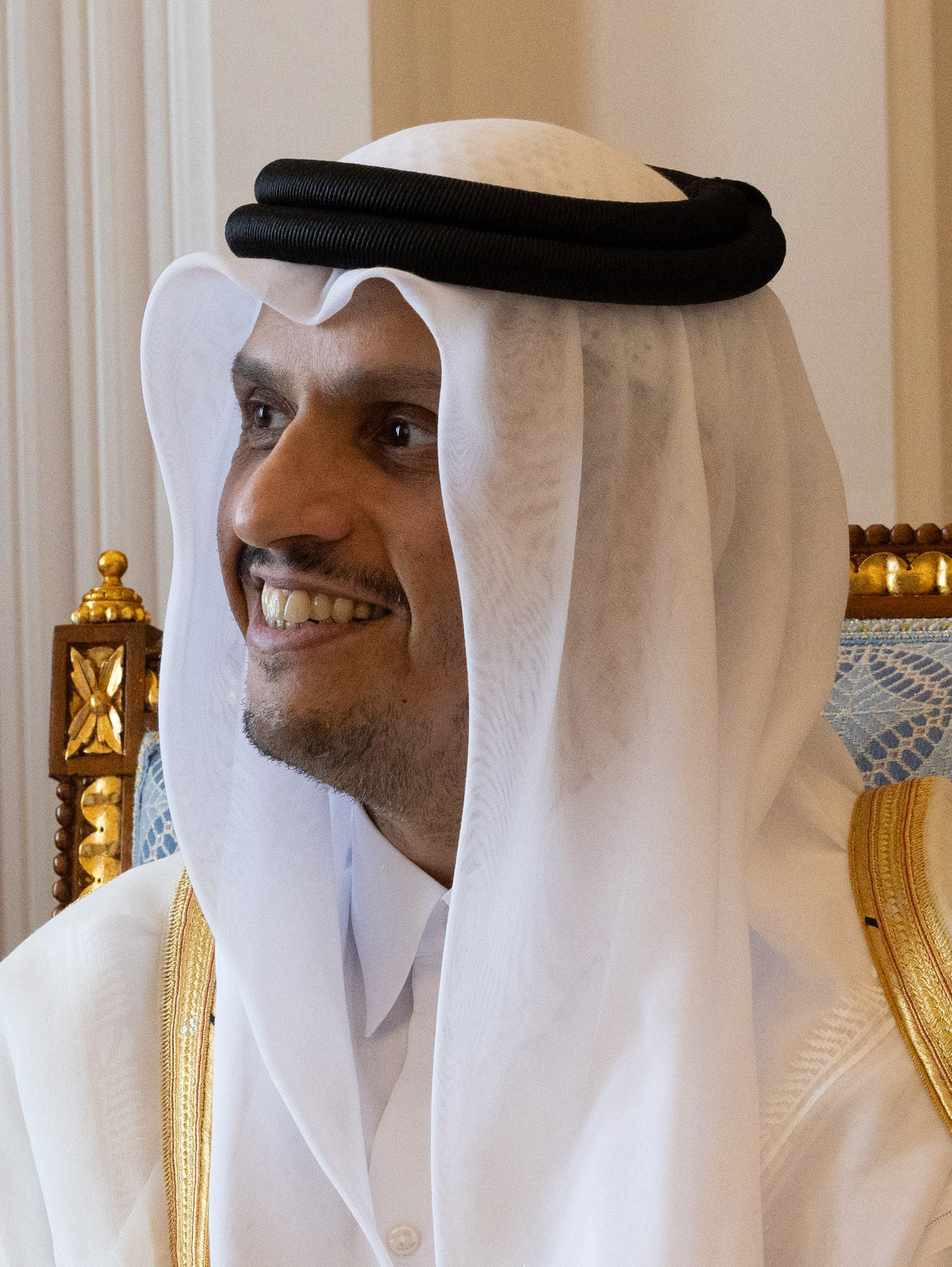
State of Qatar
Mohammed bin Abdulrahman bin Jassim Al Thani
Prime Minister of Qatar

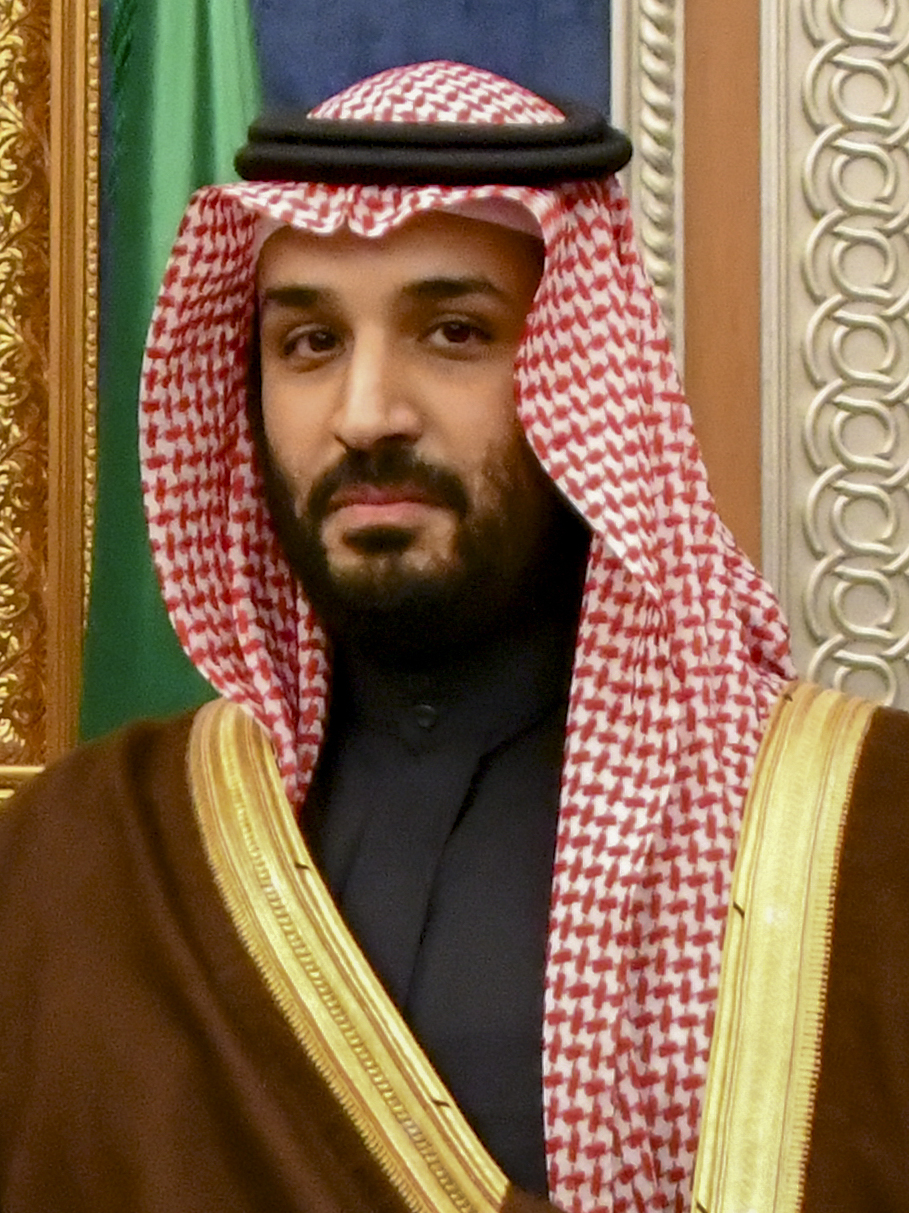
Kingdom of Saudi Arabia
Mohammed bin Salman Al Saud
Prime Minister of Saudi Arabia

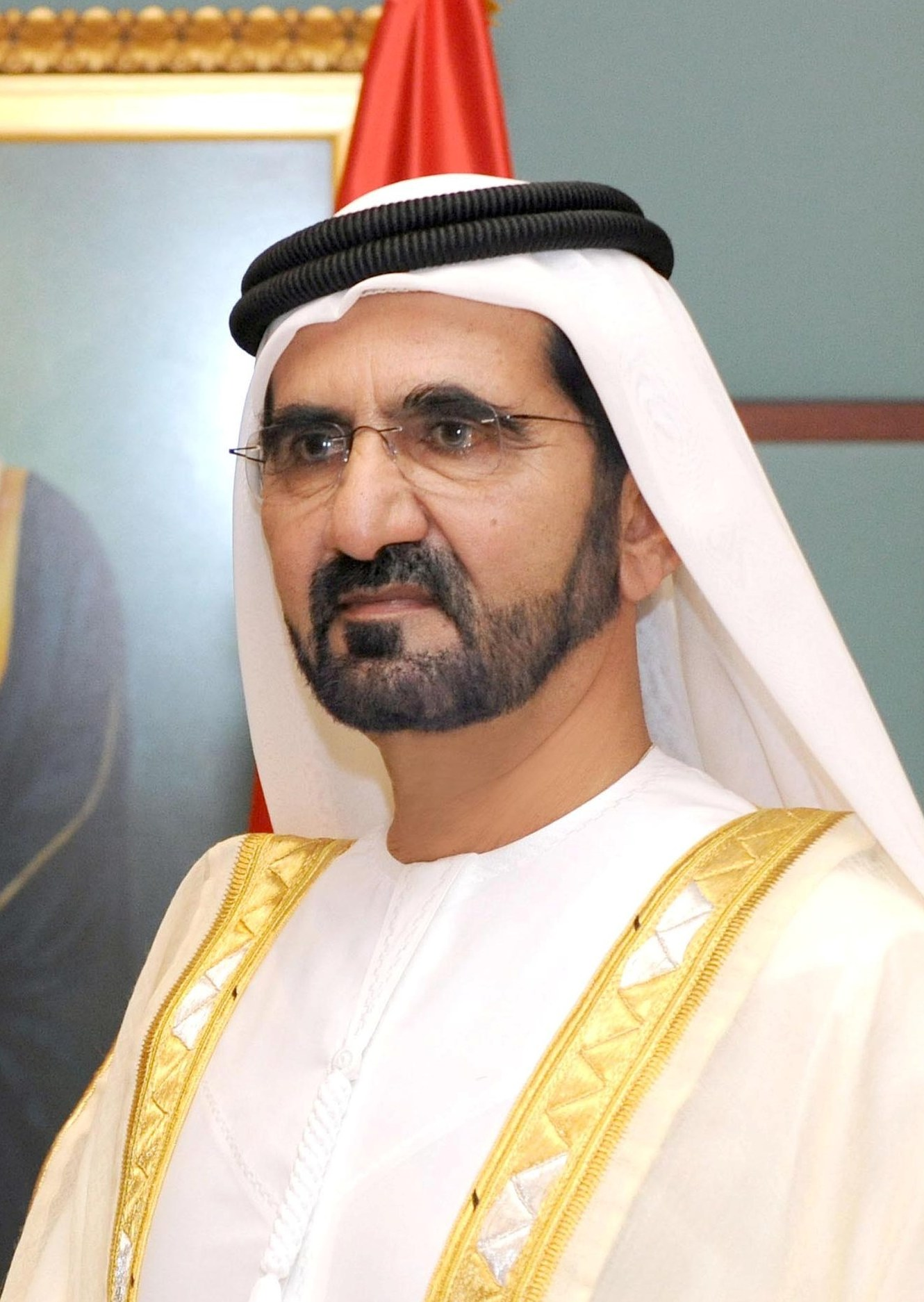
United Arab Emirates
Mohammed bin Rashid Al Maktoum
Prime Minister of the United Arab Emirates

== See also ==
- Arab league, a regional organisation with 22 members.
- Eastern Arabia
- Gulf Cooperation Council–United Kingdom Free Trade Agreement
- Gulf Railway
- Khaleeji (currency)
- Qatar diplomatic crisis
