= Fahim bin Sultan Al Qasimi =

Emirati politician (born 1948)

Minister of Supreme Council and GCC Affairs
- In office November 2004 – February 2006

Minister of Economy and Commerce
- In office March 1997 – November 2004
- Succeeded by: Sheikha Lubna Al Qasimi

Secretary-General of the Gulf Cooperation Council
- In office April 1993 – April 1996
- Preceded by: Abdullah Bishara
- Succeeded by: Jamil Ibrahim Hejailan

Personal details
- Born: 1948 (age 77–78)
- Spouse: Linda Usra Soffan
- Education: Cairo University; Johns Hopkins University
- Occupation: Lawyer
- Profession: Jurist

Fahim bin Sultan Al Qasimi (Arabic: فاهم بن سلطان القاسمي; born 1948) is an Emirati lawyer, diplomat, politician and businessman. He served as the second secretary general of the Gulf Cooperation Council (GCC) from 1993 to 1996.

== Early life and education ==
Qasimi was born in 1948. He is a member of the ruling family of the Emirate of Ras Al Khaimah, Al Qasimi, and the cousin of the ruler. Qasimi has five brothers and five sisters. He holds a law degree from Cairo University in 1974 and a master's degree in international politics from Johns Hopkins University in 1977.

== Career ==
Qasimi began his career in the 1970s as a legal consultant and litigator for companies doing business in the United Arab Emirates. Then he joined the foreign ministry in 1975. He was the ambassador of the UAE to the United Nations and consul-general in Geneva from 1977 to 1980. He served as the UAE's permanent representative at the United Nations in New York City from 1980 to 1984. During the same period he was also non-resident ambassador of the UAE to Canada.

From 1984 to 1992 he was the director of the legal department at the foreign ministry. Then he was appointed secretary of the GCC in April 1993, replacing Abdullah Bishara in the post. During his term, Qasimi supported the idea that the dispute over the islands in the Gulf should be settled through intervention of neutral third parties or of the international agencies like the International Court of Justice in the Hague. Qasimi's tenure lasted until April 1996. He was replaced by Saudi diplomat Jamil Ibrahim Hejailan.

Qasimi was appointed minister of economy and commerce of the UAE in March 1997. He replaced Said Ghobash in the post. Qasimi's tenure ended in November 2004 when he was replaced by his cousin Sheikha Lubna Al Qasimi, the first woman assumed this post in the country, in a reshuffle. In the same reshuffle, he became the minister of supreme council and GCC affairs. He retired from office in February 2006.

In 2006, Qasimi co-founded an Emirati-owned law firm and was the chairman of that firm until 2013. In March 2013, he co-founded another law firm, Qasimi Law Partners (d/b/a QLP MENA), and is the chairman of the firm. He is also the chairman of the Emirates Golf Federation and Arab Golf Federation.

== Personal life ==
Qasimi is married to a Lebanese-American, Linda Usra Soffan. She published a book, entitled The Status of Women in the UAE, in 1983.
