= European Convention (1999–2000) =

The European Convention was the 1999 convention which drafted the Charter of Fundamental Rights of the European Union. The convention was called in 1999 by the Cologne European Council to consolidate rights for EU citizens and enshrine them at EU level.

The meeting was composed of Members of the European Parliament, members of the national parliaments of the European Union, representatives from European Union member state governments and a representative of the European Commission with observers from other EU institutions. The convention was chaired by Roman Herzog.

It met for the first time in December 1999 and on 2 October 2000 it presented its draft document. Later that month the European Council approved it, in November the European Parliament followed suit and it was formally proclaimed by the leaders of the institutions of the European Union on 7 December 2000 in Nice.

The document did not gain legal force until 2009 when the Treaty of Lisbon came into force with provisions to make the Charter, and the European Convention on Human Rights on which it was based, legally binding.

== See also ==
- Conference on the Future of Europe (2019 / 2020–2022)
- Convention on the Future of Europe (2001 / 2002–2003, formally European Convention) which drafted the: Treaty establishing a Constitution for Europe (2004), rewritten into the Treaty of Lisbon (2007 / 2009)
