= European Charter on Human Rights =

European Charter on Human Rights may refer to:

- The European Convention on Human Rights adopted by the Council of Europe which came into force in 1950, protected by the European Court of Human Rights
- The Charter of Fundamental Rights of the European Union created in 2000, it has some limited application within the European Union after the European Court of Justice decided that, in essence, the treaties establishing the European Union does not empower it to accede to the European Convention on Human Rights.
