= Gunnar Beck =

German EU lawyer and legal philosopher

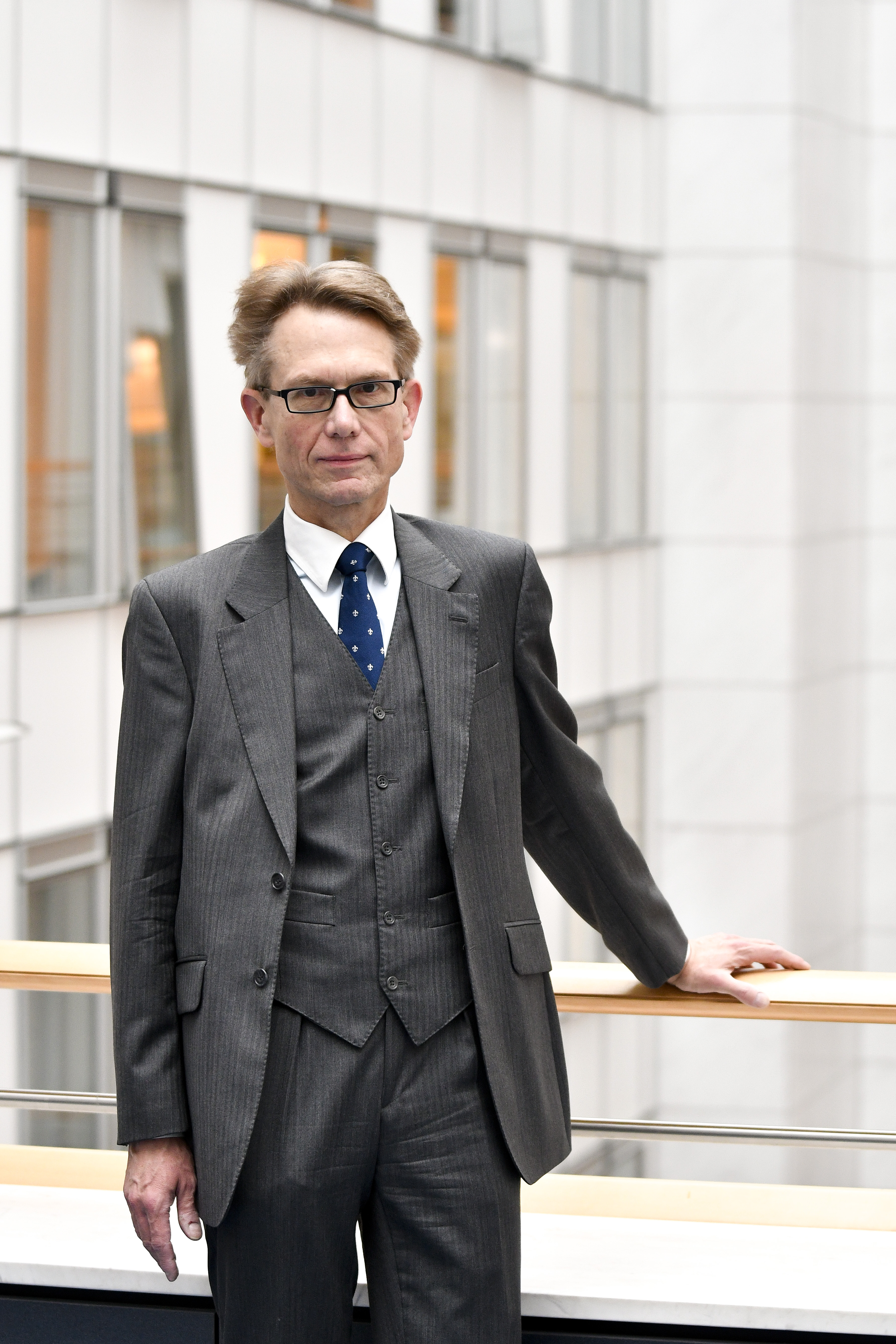

Gunnar Beck is a German academic, lawyer and sometime politician. He served as deputy legal adviser (EU) at the House of Commons in London from 2002 to 2010 and as legal adviser to the UK parliamentary delegation to the Convention on the Future of Europe from 2002 to 2004. From 2014 to 2019 he was a part-time legal and EU affairs adviser to the Alternative for Germany from 2014 to 2019 and then a Member of the European Parliament (MEP) from 2019 and 2024. From 2022 to May 2024 he held the position of vice-president of the Identity & Democracy Group. He has been a reader in EU law at the SOAS, University of London since 2005 and a door tenant and practicing barrister at 1EC Chambers (Chambers of Sir Tony Baldry) from 2013. Beck has both won wider public and academic acclaim, and provoked political criticism in response to, his work on the legal reasoning of the European Court of Justice, the legal and political aspects of the euro and migration crises and on 18th/19th century German moral and legal philosophy, especially the works of Immanuel Kant and Johann Gottlieb Fichte.

== Academic career ==
Gunnar Beck is a specialist in European Union law and legal and political philosophy. He has taught the subject at SOAS, University of London since 2005. He previously taught political philosophy, moral & legal philosophy at Oxford University and EU law and legal philosophy at the LSE.

== Political career ==
Beck was a Member of the European Parliament from 2019 to 2024, where he represented the German party Alternative für Deutschland. In March 2022 Beck who belongs to the moderate wing of the AfD, was elected vice president of the Parliament's Identity and Democracy (ID) Group. From 2020 to 2022 he led the ID delegation to the Conference on the Future of Europe.

During his parliamentary term Beck was also a member of other EU Parliamentary committees: Committee on Economic and Monetary Affairs ECON; Committee on Legal Affairs; and the Committee on Constitutional Affairs as well as Delegation to the EU-Russia Parliamentary Cooperation Committee; from 2021 he also served on the Subcommittee on Tax Matters.

== Political positions ==
Beck first grew to public prominence in Germany as an outspoken early critic of the euro rescue and inflationary policies of the European Central Bank and successive German governments from 2011, which, he argued, would lead to higher public indebtedness, fuel asset price and, eventually, consumer inflation, increase economic inequality and undermine economic competitiveness and expedite Germany's and the EU's economic decline. He publicly called the ECB President Mario Draghi a "vile and vicious money slave [elender Finanzknecht]" for fetishizing the common currency and favouring short-term markets-driven policies over economic reconstruction. In 2024 Beck criticised the German government's climate and energy policies as "part and parcel of the world's most stupid set of economic and social experimental policies ever conceived anywhere at any time". Germany, he stated, was "well on her way to becoming the world's first deliberately de-developing country."

Beck denounced von der Leyen as the most autocratic head of the Commission on the grounds that she showed profound contempt for both democracy and the rule of law. In particular he criticised the pseudo-democratic processes of von der Leyen's Conference on the Future of Europe on the grounds that it lacked democratic legitimacy and an even less democratic rerun of the failed 2002 Convention on the Future of Europe. He revealed that the 800 citizens who ostensibly drew up the Conference's final recommendations had been handpicked by EU officials and pro-EU non-governmental organizations and that throughout the process and before each of the over a dozen Conference plenary sessions in Strasbourg, the citizens had been closely advised and briefed by EU and NGO Spinelli experts. Beck concluded that the Conference recommendations bore a striking resemblance to previous European Commission white papers and blueprints for EU treaty reform. They had not been written by the Conference, but drawn up behind closed doors and pulled out of locked drawers just in time before the final presentation in May 2022. Beck called the Conference's citizens' participation nothing but a charade.

Beck has been an outspoken critic of Ursula von der Leyen, President of the European Commission and as early as April 2021 he called for her to resign over her "disastrous" EU Covid vaccination and lockdown policy. He said "von der Leyen was a disastrous minister in Germany, and has proved the same now as Commission President." In 2023 he summed up von der Leyen's first term in office by congratulating her on achieving almost all her policy objects, but added that "her remarkable successes would ultimately proved more expensive and disastrous to the peoples of Europe than all the failures of her predecessors taken together."

== Academic title dispute ==
Prior to the European Parliament election, it was reported that Beck was listed on the ballot paper as holding a professorship, even though he holds the less senior rank of reader at SOAS. The German Bundeswahlleiter, however, has confirmed that Beck was not responsible for the information on the ballot paper, as he simply entered his first name and his surname without any titles. Accordingly, Beck explained that he had merely translated his British university title and defended his actions as "legally unobjectionable and correct in content." Yet, according to the Ministry of Science and Culture of North Rhine-Westphalia, which is governed by the ruling CDU in coalition with the FDP, the "simple conversion of a British university position into a German title" may not be lawful in Germany even if it is a correct translation of the equivalent professional position of a person.

== Works ==
- Beck, Gunnar (2013). The Legal Reasoning of the Court of Justice of the EU. Oxford: Hart Publishing.
- Beck, Gunnar (2008). Fichte and Kant on Freedom, Rights and Law. Lexington Books.
