= Conference on the Future of Europe =

Proposal of the European Commission and the European Parliament

The Conference on the Future of Europe was a proposal of the European Commission and the European Parliament, announced at the end of 2019, with the aim of looking at the medium- to long-term future of the EU and what reforms should be made to its policies and institutions. It was intended that the Conference should involve citizens, including a significant role for young people, civil society, and European institutions as equal partners and last for two years. It was jointly organised by the European Parliament, the EU Council and the European Commission. On 19 April 2021, the multilingual digital platform of the Conference futureu.europa.eu was launched.

== Genesis ==
The first proposal for such a conference was made by President Macron in March 2019. politico.eu, and at La Libre. Ursula von der Leyen's formal proposal to the EP is also available. This latter document's title makes this clear that it is a statement by her as a candidate for the presidency of the Commission. It is undated, but must have been produced in the autumn of 2019, between her proposal as a candidate by the Council, and confirmation/election by the Parliament.

== Chair of Conference ==
The Conference on the Future of Europe is jointly chaired by the presidents of the 3 EU Institutions: European Parliament President Roberta Metsola, Emmanuel Macron (on behalf of the Presidency of the Council), and the Commission President Ursula von der Leyen.

== Timetable ==
In November 2019, in their "non-paper", French and German governments suggested the following approximate timetable:

- 12/13 December 2019 – First Discussion at the European Council
- January 2020 – Conference concept / Interinstitutional mandate
- February 2020 – Kick-Off of Phase 1 (in particular transnational lists, lead candidate system, issues related to citizens' participation in EU institutions/matters)
- July 2020 – Kick-Off Conference of Phase 2 in Brussels
- second half 2020 – Launch of EU-wide expert meetings and citizens dialogues (by EU institutions and member states)
- 2021 – Thematic and midterm review conferences
- first half 2022 – Closing Conference

The paper also outlined their expectation of the Conference's results: "The Conference should commit itself already in the interinstitutional mandate to produce tangible and concrete results. The final document with recommendations should be presented to the EUCO [European Council] for debate and implementation."

Italy was among the first member states to develop an articulated position on the possible content and outcomes of the Conference. This position was elaborated in a "non-paper" published on 19 February 2020.

== Progress and current status ==
As of November/December 2019:

- The European Parliament's Working Group has worked out a first draft for the methodology of the conference at the end of December 2019. According to the report by one of its members:
  - the European Parliament should play a leading role.
  - Up to six citizens' assemblies are to play a central role – in them, representative citizens from all over Europe should draw up recommendations that will be presented to the EU institutions. There should be around 200 participants per meeting, who will debate on a given political issue. The meetings are to be held in various European cities, with participants from all Member States.
  - The conference is to be headed by a steering committee (organizational and logistical questions, composed by representatives of the Commission, the Council and the seven political groups in the EU Parliament.
  - EU institutions should implement the proposals in concrete legislative proposals or even treaty changes – representatives of the EU Commission, the Council, the European Parliament and the national parliaments, all political bodies that will be involved in (possible) ratification. Representatives of regional parliaments and civil society should also be involved.
  - The by institutions negotiated legislative proposals should be presented to the citizens' assemblies so that they correspond to their ideas.
  - The EU institutions should commit to implementing the recommendations, in laws or treaty changes.
  - The parliamentary groups' leaders adopted the draft of the working group. It is due to be voted on in plenary in January 2020 and to be negotiated with the EU Commission and the Council.
  - The conference should begin on May 9, 2020.
  - On 15 January 2020, the Parliament adopted a resolution setting out its vision for the Conference with 494 votes for, 147 against and 49 abstentions.
- The Committee on Constitutional Affairs (AFCO) endorsed an opinion setting out criteria for the Conference's structure and the topics that AFCO members want to see covered in the Conference's debates on 9 December 2019. A resolution of the EU Parliament is to be voted in the January 2020 plenary session.
- The European Council (EUCO) (should have had) discussed the Conference during its summit on 12–13 December 2019.

== Citizen participation ==
The usual way of involving citizens in the EU is that of opinion surveys, citizens' consultations, talks (dialogues, debates) and, since 2012, accepting petitions with proposals.

Since 1978 the EU considers opinions of citizens through the Eurobarometer surveys, like the 2018 one on the Future of Europe / Future of Europe (including "Climate change").

Under the Barroso Commission (2004–2014) debates with citizens took place, with fifty-one Citizens' Dialogues in EU countries. Followed by a final pan-European one in Brussels, with participants from all the cities that had organised a debate, and with the participation of the President of the Commission, the Commissioners and representatives of the European Parliament and with national and local politicians.

Since 2012 the formal instrument of European Citizens' Initiative (ECI), today rather a petition, allows EU citizens to present a proposal to the Commission.

Under the Juncker Commission (2014–2019) the debates were announced in the White Paper on the Future of Europe of March 2017. An online consultation on the Future of Europe was launched in May 2018, with a questionnaire of twelve questions, designed by a panel of ninety-six citizens, giving "the opportunity to citizens to express their expectations, concerns and hopes".
Citizens' Dialogue conferences took place, involving the President of the Commission, the Commissioners and some staff members of the Commission, "town-hall style debates carried out in line with Juncker's invitation to members of the College of Commissioners to be politically active in communicating the common agenda to citizens and listening to common concerns coming from them".
The 2019 Report on Citizens' Dialogue and Citizen's Consultation was delivered to the "EU-27 leaders as material for reflection" for their EUCO Sibiu meeting of 9 May 2019.

Same as the Joint Report on European Citizens' Consultations, initiated by Emmanuel Macron, which took place from April to October 2018 at national level, as debates or other formats.

It remains to be seen, whether – during the upcoming debates of the Conference on the Future of Europe (from "February 2020 [on] – Kick-Off of Phase... issues related to citizens' participation in EU institutions...", as proposed by the French and German governments in their "non-paper") – more participation of citizens in EU matters arises from the promise of Ursula von der Leyen given at her candidate's speech: "I want citizens to have their say at a Conference on the Future of Europe... bring together citizens, including a significant role for young people, civil society, and European institutions as equal partners..."

On April 19 2021, the conference will launch a so-called "Digital Platform" aiming to bring citizens to the debate.

== Position of the European Commission ==
In her political guidelines, President-Elect Ursula von der Leyen described the Conference as follows:

"I want citizens to have their say at a Conference on the Future of Europe, to start in 2020 and run for two years. The Conference should bring together citizens, including a significant role for young people, civil society, and European institutions as equal partners. The Conference should be well prepared with a clear scope and clear objectives, agreed between the Parliament, the Council and the Commission. I am ready to follow up on what is agreed, including by legislative action if appropriate. I am also open to Treaty change."

In her "mission letters", which von der Leyen assigned the nominated Commissioners, three members of the new College of Commissioners were made responsible for the Conference on the Future of Europe: Věra Jourová, Maroš Šefčovič, and Dubravka Šuica. Whereas Šuica is primarily tasked with the preparation of the Conference in collaboration with the European Parliament, Jourová is designated to represent the Commission at the Conference. Šefčovič's main responsibility lies in the follow-up on the results of the Conference, which shall be undertaken jointly with the European Council, the Council of the European Union, and the European Parliament.

== Position of the European Parliament ==
=== Working Group ===
On 16 October 2019, the Conference of Presidents of the European Parliament decided to set up a Working Group on the Conference on the Future of Europe. The Working Group is composed of one representative per political group in the European Parliament and one representative from the Committee on Constitutional Affairs (AFCO), however, some in the Working Group are also in the AFCO. It is tasked with preparing "a proposal on Parliament's approach to the Conference on the Future of Europe, including, inter alia, the scope, the governance, the duration, the structure, the stakeholders, the objectives and the expected actions and outcome."

Members of the Working Group		EP group	AFCO
President of Parliament
David Sassoli	ITA	S&D	
Representatives of political groups
Paulo Rangel	POR	EPP	Member
Gabriele Bischoff	GER	S&D	Vice-Chair
Guy Verhofstadt	BEL	RE	Member
Daniel Freund	GER	G/EFA	Coordinator
Gunnar Beck	GER	ID	
Zdzisław Krasnodębski	POL	ECR	
Helmut Scholz	GER	GUE/NGL	Substitute
Representative of AFCO
Antonio Tajani (pro tempore)	ITA	EPP	Chair

=== Committee on Constitutional Affairs (AFCO) ===
In parallel to the sessions of the Working Group on the Future of Europe, the Committee on Constitutional Affairs (AFCO) is in a process of deliberation.

In November 2019, the Committee on Constitutional Affairs (AFCO) began their debate on how to shape the structure and scope of the Conference. How to involve citizens, representatives of civil society and national parliaments. How to foster a bottom-up approach, rather than a top-down one. On the involvement of citizens, some have underlined that the criteria for selection would be important in ensuring inclusive participation in respect of diversity and gender balance. On the possible topics of the Conference, the AFCO committee discussed the issue of the legislative initiative of Parliament, Council as a second chamber, the rule of law, qualified majority voting in Council, Spitzenkandidaten, transnational lists, economic governance, social policies, the transparency register, and an independent ethics body. On 9 December 2019, the AFCO committee submitted an opinion on the structure, working methods, and topics of the Conference.

== Positions of the European Council ==
=== Conference announced ===
On 26 November 2019, it became public that the French and German government have drawn up a "non-paper" on the Conference. After initial delay due to the 2020 corona virus pandemic, the European Council agreed on their initial position in June 2020 stating that "the conference should be launched as soon as the epidemiological conditions allow for it" and that the focus should be on how to develop EU policies over the medium and long term in order to tackle more effectively the challenges facing Europe. The Council explicitly specified that the Conference does not fall within the scope of Article 48 of the Treaty on European Union (TEU), ensuring that any potential treaty changes are either entirely outside the scope of the Conference or would have to go through a separate Article 48 procedure after the conclusion of the Conference in 2022.

==== Media echo ====
The Franco-German announcement of the Conference, on 26 November 2019, was widely covered by the media.

Politico observed that the Conference "would likely require the European Parliament to adopt a resolution on the process at its January plenary in Strasbourg. Given the huge scope of the effort, which could potentially lead to proposed changes to the EU treaties, Parliament is expected to wrestle a bit with the Commission and Council for control of how the process plays out."

Financial Times called the Conference "one of the big projects for Ursula von der Leyen ... Its goal is to make recommendations for new policies and institutional changes."

The Swiss NZZ concluded: "After all, a few days ago Berlin and Paris took up the idea of a Citizens' Conference on the Future of Europe which they advocated in a joint proposal. From 2020 to 2022, debates will begin first on the democratic functioning of the EU and then on all other controversial topics. An adaptation of the treaties as a consequence of this is explicitly not excluded. Many member states do not like to hear that. Treaty changes are complicated. Because, for example, all national parliaments have to agree. But perhaps the EU needs such a major overhaul."

The Washington Post called the Conference proposal "a trial balloon", noting the "ambitious reforms" desired by France and Germany, and observing that "it's possible that the EU may have learned in the meantime from national citizen assemblies like those ... in Ireland." The paper expressed scepticism that any proposals emerging from the Conference would win the support of all EU members as "a major revision to the EU treaties would need the approval of 42 parliamentary chambers and up to 17 national courts. A referendum is effectively inevitable in Ireland and possible in 20 more EU members." The paper concluded that "Given the difficulties of securing approval, it is possible that Europe's future does not lie in a general treaty change but, instead, in ... treaties between subsets of EU members designed to deepen integration in specific policy areas."

== See also ==
- Convention on the Future of Europe (2001 / 2002–2003), which drafted the Treaty establishing a Constitution for Europe.
- European Convention (1999–2000), which drafted the Charter of Fundamental Rights of the European Union.
