= Washington A16, 2000 =

- Part of the anti-globalization movement
- Date: April 15–16, 2000
- Location: Washington D.C.

Casualties
- Arrested: More than 678

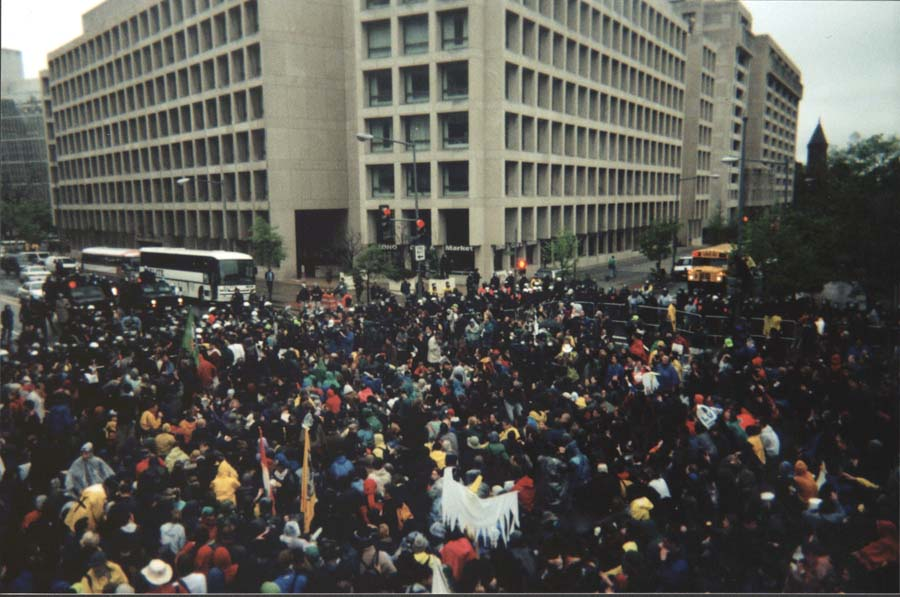
Photo of the Sunday demonstration at 17th and I Sts

Washington A16, 2000 was a series of protests in Washington, D.C. against the International Monetary Fund and the World Bank, that occurred in April 2000. The annual IMF and World Bank meetings were the scene for follow-on protests of the 1999 WTO protests. In April 2000, between 10,000 and 15,000 protesters demonstrated at the IMF, and World Bank meeting (official numbers are not tallied).

== Planning ==
The International Forum on Globalization held non-violent civil disobedience training at Foundry United Methodist Church. The Convergence Center at 1328 Florida Avenue was an activists’ meeting hall where the nonviolence training and prop making occurred (such as signs and puppets). The protests were planned for April 16 and 17, concurrent dates as the planned meetings between the World Bank and International Monetary Fund. Many of the protesters wanted to see accountability put in place for the globalization process.

The United Steelworkers of America president George Becker was a participant at the protest, alongside environmental activists Julia Butterfly Hill and Mike Roselle.

== April 15, 2000 ==
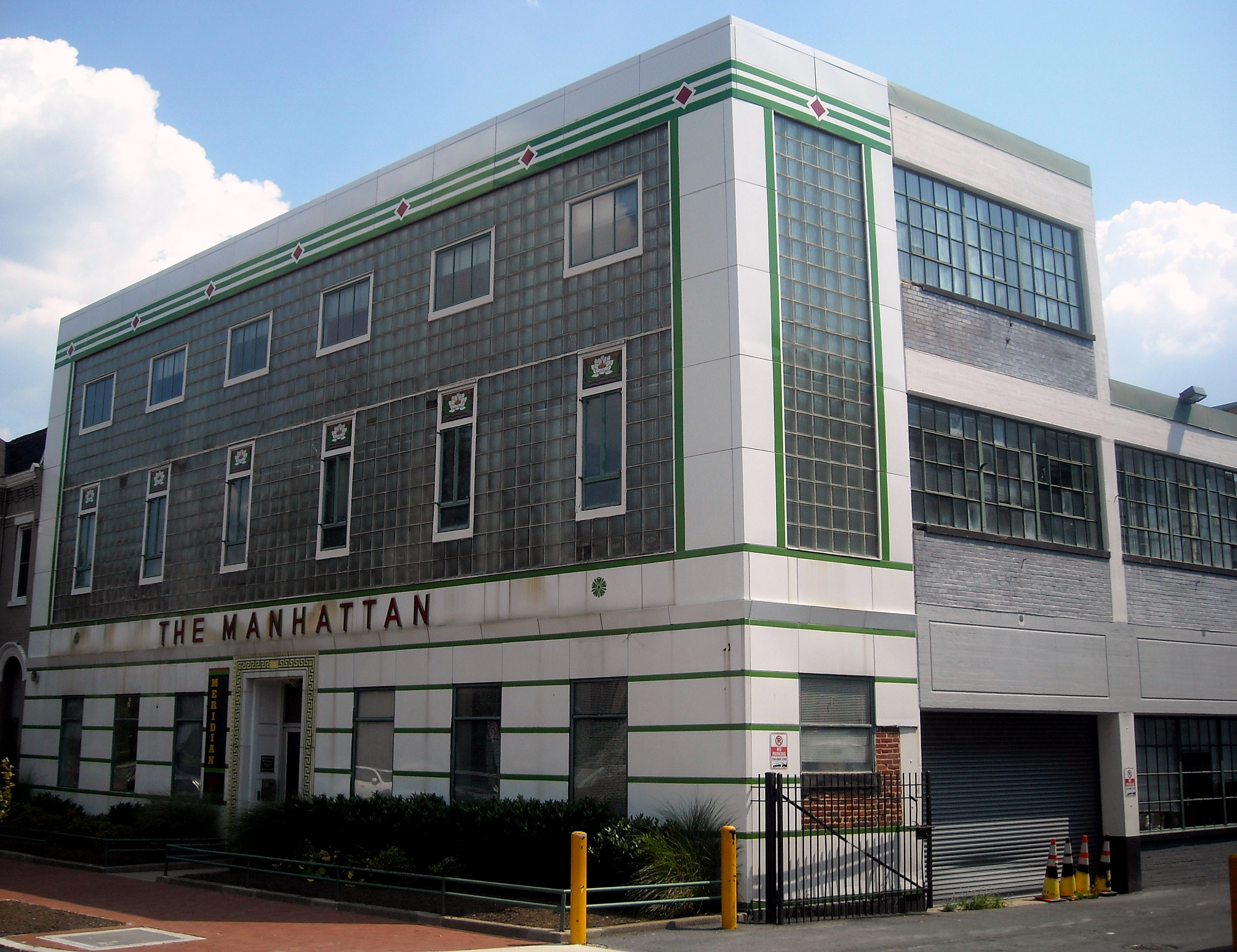
There was a raid at the Convergence Center at the Manhattan Laundry on Florida Avenue

On April 15 the Washington D.C. Police preemptively raided (without a search warrant) the Convergence Center, citing fire safety. This police action was cited as an 'unconstitutional raid' during the subsequent class action lawsuit.

The day before the larger protest scheduled on April 16, a smaller group of protesters demonstrated against the Prison-Industrial Complex in the District of Columbia. Mass arrests were conducted; 678 people were arrested, including bystanders, journalists and tourists when the police did a sweep of the block. Majority of the arrests on April 15 occurred at 20th Street NW between I and K streets. Three-time Pulitzer Prize winning, Washington Post photographer Carol Guzy was detained by police and arrested on April 15, and two journalists for the Associated Press also reported being struck by police with batons.

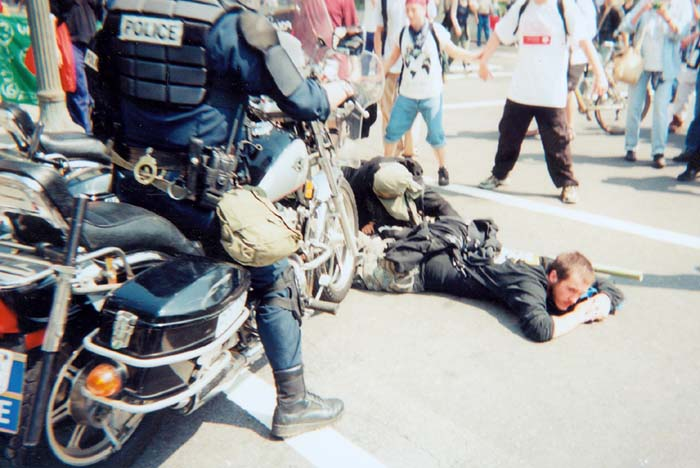
Protestors attempting to block police on motorcycles April 16th, 2000, Washington DC, 17th & E Sts.

These arrests on April 15 were accused of being false and later spurred a class action lawsuit called 'Becker, et al. v. District of Columbia, et al..'.

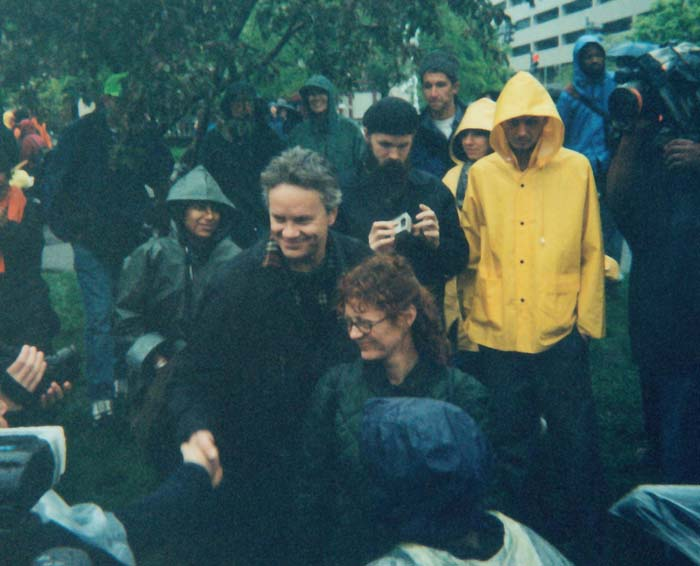
Tim Robbins and Susan Sarandon at 17th and I Sts.

== April 16, 2000 ==
On April 16 and 17 the demonstrations and street actions around the IMF that followed, the number of those arrested grew to 1,300 people. Between April 15 and April 16th, more than 600 people had been arrested.

== Lawsuits ==
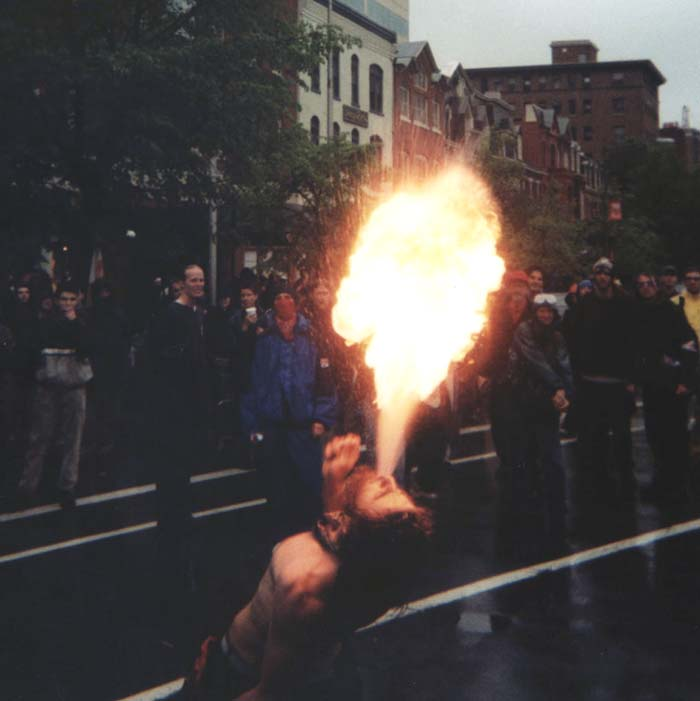
fire-breather

In June 2010, the class-action lawsuit for the April 15th events called Becker, et al. v. District of Columbia, et al were settled, with $13.7 million damages awarded.

Other, similar lawsuits have stemmed from mass arrests in the District of Columbia in recent years. In 2009, the city agreed to pay $8.25 million to almost 400 protesters and bystanders to end a class-action lawsuit over mass arrests in Pershing Park during 2002 World Bank protests, according to the Partnership for Civil Justice Fund, which also represented those plaintiffs.

== See also ==
- List of demonstrations against corporate globalization
