= Convention on the Future of Europe =

Body established to draft a constitution for the EU

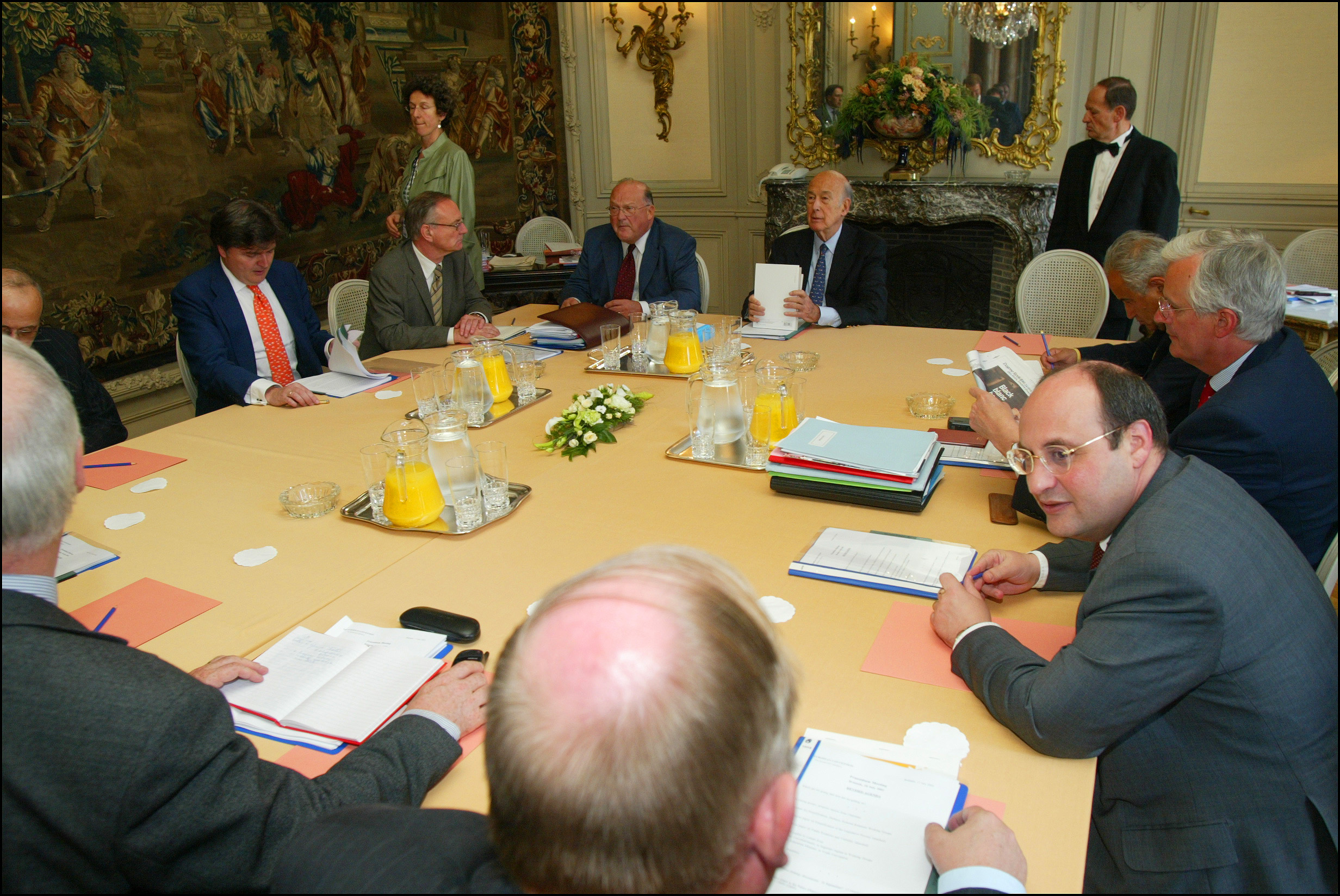
- The presidium of the convention, 18 July 2002. Clockwise from centre: Valéry Giscard d'Estaing, Giorgos Katiforis, Michel Barnier, António Vitorino, two unknown individuals, John Kerr, Íñigo Méndez de Vigo, Klaus Hänsch, Jean-Luc Dehaene
- Date: February 28, 2002 – July 18, 2003
- Duration: 1 year, 4 months and 20 days
- Location: Belgium
- Also known as: European Convention, Constitutional Convention
- Type: Constituent assembly
- Cause: Laeken Declaration
- Motive: Provide starting point for the Intergovernmental Conference of Nice
- Participants: Chairman: Valéry Giscard d'Estaing Vice-Chairmen: Giuliano Amato, Jean-Luc Dehaene; 15 - Head of State Representatives; 13 - Candidates States Representatives; 56 - National Parliaments Representatives of Member and Candidate; 2 - European Commission Representatives 2 - European Parliament Representatives
- Outcome: Draft Treaty establishing a Constitution for Europe

The Convention on the Future of the European Union, also known as the European Convention, was a body established by the European Council in December 2001 as a result of the Laeken Declaration. Inspired by the Philadelphia Convention that led to the adoption of the United States federal Constitution, its purpose was to produce a draft constitution for the European Union for the Council to finalise and adopt. The Convention finished its work in July 2003 with their Draft Treaty establishing a Constitution for Europe. See History of the European Constitution for developments after this point.

== Origins at Nice ==
The Convention has its origins in the Nice European Council held in December 2000. This summit sought agreement on a process of revising the existing treaties on which the European Union was founded, as a prelude to enlargement. A consensus emerged about the need to begin a "broader and deeper debate" on the future of the EU, and consequently the Council adopted a declaration on the future of the union annexed to the Treaty of Nice. The process was intended to commence with a phase of open debate before the European Council met in Laeken the following year, when a better idea of what was required would have emerged.

The declaration adopted at Nice set out four main themes to be addressed:

- How to achieve a more precise delimitation of powers between the European Union and its member states, in accordance with the principle of subsidiarity.
- The status of the Charter of Fundamental Rights proclaimed at Nice.
- How to simplify the existing treaties in order to clarify their meaning.
- The role of national parliaments in the European Union.

== Laeken Declaration ==
In December 2001, when the European Council met in Laeken, a fresh declaration was adopted committing the EU to greater democracy, transparency and efficiency, and setting out the process by which a constitution could be arrived at. This was to be achieved by a convention, which was intended to comprise the main 'stakeholders', in order to examine questions about the future direction of the EU. It was to produce a "final document", which soon became the draft constitution, to be handed over to the Intergovernmental Conference, scheduled for 2004, which would finalise a new treaty.

== Work ==
The European Convention was established with 102 members. Former French President Valéry Giscard d'Estaing was appointed Chairman, former Italian Prime Minister Giuliano Amato and former Belgian Prime Minister Jean-Luc Dehaene were appointed Vice-Chairmen. Its members were drawn from the national parliaments of member states and candidate countries, the European Parliament, the European Commission, and representatives of heads of state and government. The Convention met for the first time in February 2002, and met thereafter in plenary session once or twice per month. It deliberated in public in the European Parliament building in Brussels.

The 13 member præsidium of the convention consisted of the chairman and vice-chairmen along with:

- Government Representatives: Ana de Palacio y del Valle-Lersundi (Spain - PP); Henning Christophersen (Denmark - Venstre); Giorgos Katiforis (Greece - PASOK).
- European Commission Representatives: Michel Barnier - UMP; António Vitorino - PS
- European Parliament Representatives: Klaus Hänsch - SPD; Íñigo Méndez de Vigo y Montojo - PP
- National Parliament Representatives: Gisela Stuart, Labour Party UK; John Bruton, FG Ireland
- Invitee: Alojz Lojze Peterle - NSi (Slovenia)

== See also ==
- Conference on the Future of Europe (2019 / 2020–2022)
- European Convention (1999–2000) which drafted the: Charter of Fundamental Rights of the European Union (2000 / 2009)
