= Euro summit =

Meeting of European member states

Coordinates: 50.8414°N 4.3814°E

The Euro summit (also referred to as the eurozone summit or euro area summit) is the meeting of the heads of state or government of the member states of the eurozone (those EU states which have adopted the euro). It is distinct from the EU summit held regularly by the European Council, the meeting of all EU leaders.

== History ==
The Euro summit began as an offshoot of the Euro Group, which is the meeting of the eurozone member's finance ministers. French President Nicolas Sarkozy called for the Euro summit to replace the Euro Group as a "clearly identified economic government" for the eurozone, stating it was not possible for the eurozone to continue without it. The eurozone economic government would discuss issues with the European Central Bank, which would remain independent. Sarkozy stated that "only heads of state and government have the necessary democratic legitimacy" for the role. This idea was based on the meeting of eurozone leaders in 2008 who met to agree a co-ordinated eurozone response to the banking crisis.

They first met in the summit format in October 2008, in response to the debt crisis. Subsequent meetings took place in March 2010, May 2010, March 2011, July 2011 and October 2011. In the October 2011 meeting, it was agreed to formalise the Euro summit, as at least twice yearly meeting. This change was formalised in the 2012 Treaty on stability, coordination and governance in the Economic and Monetary Union. Since this formalisation, Heads of State or Government have failed to meet this target of twice yearly meetings in 2013, 2014, 2016 and 2017. A Euro summit President, separate from the Euro Group President, would be elected at the same time as the President of the European Council and under the same rules. Until such an election takes place, the European Council President fulfils that role.

== Meetings ==
In October 2011, the Eurozone head of states agreed to meet at least twice per year, as part of measures to improve governance of the Eurozone. Meetings were chaired by president Herman Van Rompuy from March 2010 to November 2014. Donald Tusk has been the Euro Summit president since 1 December 2014, and ends his term on 31 May 2017. The table below lists the date and summary reports of all previous Euro Summits.

#	Euro summit dates	Conclusions	Press conference
1	12 October 2008	Launch of a bank crisis solution	
2	25 March 2010	Statement	
3	7 May 2010	Statement	Video
4	11 March 2011	Conclusions	Video
5	21 July 2011	Statement	Video
6	23–26 October 2011	Remarks by President, Statement	Video: 1 and 2
7	9 December 2011	Statement	
8	30 January 2012	Agreed lines of communication	
9	2 March 2012	Statement	
10	29 June 2012	Statement	Video
11	14 March 2013	New procedure rules for Euro summits, Presidential Remarks	Video
12	24 October 2014	Statement	Video
13	22 June 2015	Website, Presidential remarks on Greece: 1 and 2	Video
14	7 July 2015	Website, Eurogroup meeting, Presidential Remarks	Video
15	12 July 2015	Website, Eurogroup meeting, Presidential Remarks, Statement	Video
16	15 December 2017	Website, Presidential Remarks	
17	23 March 2018	Website	
18	29 June 2018	Website, Statement	
19	18 October 2018	Website	
20	14 December 2018	Website, Statement	
21	21 June 2019	Website, Statement	
22	13 December 2019	Website, Statement	
23	11 December 2020	Website, Statement	
24	25 March 2021 (informal video conference)	Website, Statement	
25	25 June 2021	Website, Statement	
26	16 December 2021	Website, Statement	
27	24 June 2022	Website, Statement	
28	24 March 2023	Website, Statement	
29	27 October 2023	Website, Statement	
30	22 March 2024	Website, Statement	

New procedure rules for Euro summits were adopted on 14 March 2013, regulating the Euro Summit shall meet at least twice a year, convened by its president on preferably one of the same dates as the EU summits. However, for unknown reasons, only one Euro Summit meeting per year took place in 2013 and 2014, and none took place in 2016 and 2025.

== President ==
In its informal capacity, the de facto summit President has been the European Council President, meaning that Herman Van Rompuy chaired all meetings since March 2010 to December 2014. The proposals for formalisation of the summit include electing a President along the same lines (and term) as the European Council President, and until then Van Rompuy continues to chair the summit. On 1 March 2012, according to the Treaty on Stability, Coordination and Governance in the Economic and Monetary Union (TSCG), he was formally elected as President of the Euro Summit for the term 1 June 2012 to 30 November 2014. New president for the term 1 December 2014 until 31 May 2017, is the former Polish Prime Minister Donald Tusk. Belgian Prime Minister Charles Michel was elected new president on 2 July 2019, taking office on 1 December 2019.

== Members ==
The eurozone

Member State	Picture	Representative	Affiliation	In office since
European Union		António Costa; Non-voting chair	S&D	1 December 2024
Austria		Christian Stocker	EPP	3 March 2025
Belgium		Bart De Wever	ECR	3 February 2025
Bulgaria		Rumen Radev	Una.	8 May 2026
Croatia		Andrej Plenković	EPP	16 October 2016
Cyprus		Nikos Christodoulides	EPP	28 February 2023
Estonia		Kristen Michal	Renew	23 July 2024
Finland		Petteri Orpo	EPP	20 June 2023
France		Emmanuel Macron	Renew	14 May 2017
Germany		Friedrich Merz	EPP	6 May 2025
Greece		Kyriakos Mitsotakis	EPP	26 June 2023
Ireland		Micheál Martin	Renew	23 January 2025
Italy		Giorgia Meloni	ECR	22 October 2022
Latvia		Andris Kulbergs	ECR	28 May 2026
Lithuania		Gitanas Nausėda	Una.	12 July 2019
Luxembourg		Luc Frieden	EPP	17 November 2023
Malta		Robert Abela	S&D	13 January 2020
Netherlands		Rob Jetten	Renew	23 February 2026
Portugal		Luís Montenegro	EPP	2 April 2024
Slovakia		Robert Fico	Una.	25 October 2023
Slovenia		Janez Janša	EPP	22 May 2026
Spain		Pedro Sánchez	S&D	2 June 2018

Presidents of other EU institutions, such as the President of the European Commission and the European Central Bank President also attend. Presidents of the Euro Group and of the European Parliament may be invited and the President of the Euro Summit shall present a report to the European Parliament after each of the meetings of the Euro Summit. Heads of state or government of non-eurozone signatories to the European Fiscal Compact treaty participate, at least once a year, for those policies of the treaty that apply to them. In some summits, other leaders might attend discussions, for example the British Prime Minister attending the 2008 summit.

== See also ==
- European Fiscal Compact
- European sovereign debt crisis
- Euro Group
- List of European Council meetings
