= List of European Council meetings =

This is a list of meetings of the European Council (informally referred to as EU summits); the meetings of the European Council, an institution of the European Union (EU) comprising heads of state or government of EU member states. They started in 1975 as tri-annual meetings. The number of meetings grew to minimum four per year between 1996 and 2007, and minimum six per year since 2008. From 2008 to 2019, an average of seven council meetings per year took place. A record number of meetings (13) were held during 2020 - although mostly as informal video conferences; as the meeting frequency and format was changed this specific year by the COVID-19 pandemic. Since 2021, an average of eight council meetings per year took place (see list below).

Since 2008, an annual average of two special Euro summits were also organized in addition – and often in parallel – to the EU summits. As the agenda of Euro summits is restricted solely to discuss issues for the eurozone and only invite political leaders of the eurozone member states, such meetings are not counted as European Councils. Neither are any of the Tripartite Social Summits, that were held bi-annually since May 2021 between the EU Council presidency, Council President, Commission President and the European social partners at top management level (BusinessEurope, European Trade Union Confederation, SGI Europe, SMEunited and CEC European Managers).

The current practice is that meetings are always called and organized to the extent found needed by the European Council president. The upcoming ordinary meetings are scheduled by the end of each semester, by the issuance of a call letter. In 2011-2020 meetings were scheduled and called for the third following semester (minimum one year in advance), but this changed to minimum 6 months in advance for 2021-2023, while meetings in 2024 were only called shortly before the first meeting of the specific semester in concern; although they have again been called minimum one year in advance since 2025.

The ordinary meetings can take form either as "scheduled ordinary meetings" (always resulting in a published document entitled "conclusions") or "informal ordinary meetings" (never resulting in a published document entitled "conclusions" - but instead often with a published document entitled "statement" or "declaration"). A called scheduled/informal ordinary upcoming meeting might occasionally be moved or cancelled within a short notice, with such change then being notified by the Council president through the issue of a revised calendar plan for the ordinary meetings within the semester in concern. If extra meetings are called outside the procedure of notification by an issued call letter for the upcoming semester in concern, meaning when they are called at short notice to be held within an ongoing semester, then they are referred to as "extraordinary meetings". The phrase "special meeting" is synonymously used for an "extraordinary meeting".

Extraordinary meetings can - just like the ordinary meetings - be held either in a formal or informal format. The list does not specify whether or not an extraordinary meeting was formal or informal, but this can be indirectly observed when checking the title of the published document summarizing the outcome of the meeting, as "conclusions" can only be published if the extraordinary meeting had a formal format.

== List ==
The first seven summit meetings were held between 1961 and 1974, but this was before the formal establishment of the European Council. Some sources however consider them to be the informal seven first meetings of the European Council.

=== 1970s ===
#	Year	Date	Type	EU Council presidency	President-in-Office	Commission President	Host city	Notes
1	1975	10–11 March	―	Ireland	Liam Cosgrave	François-Xavier Ortoli	Dublin	Inaugural formal Council
2	1975	16–17 July	―	Italy	Aldo Moro	François-Xavier Ortoli	Brussels	web archive
3	1975	1–2 December	―	Italy	Aldo Moro	François-Xavier Ortoli	Rome	Established TREVI
4	1976	1–2 April	―	Luxembourg	Gaston Thorn	François-Xavier Ortoli	Luxembourg	web archive
5	1976	12–13 July	―	Netherlands	Joop den Uyl	François-Xavier Ortoli	Brussels	web archive
6	1976	29–30 November	―	Netherlands	Joop den Uyl	François-Xavier Ortoli	The Hague	web archive
7	1977	25–27 March	―	United Kingdom	James Callaghan	Roy Jenkins	Rome	web archive
8	1977	29–30 June	―	United Kingdom	James Callaghan	Roy Jenkins	London	web archive
9	1977	5–6 December	―	Belgium	Leo Tindemans	Roy Jenkins	Brussels	web archive
10	1978	7–8 April	―	Denmark	Anker Jørgensen	Roy Jenkins	Copenhagen	web archive
11	1978	6–7 July	―	West Germany	Helmut Schmidt	Roy Jenkins	Bremen	web archive
12	1978	4–5 December	―	West Germany	Helmut Schmidt	Roy Jenkins	Brussels	web archive
13	1979	12–13 March	―	France	Valéry Giscard d'Estaing	Roy Jenkins	Paris	web archive
14	1979	21–22 June	―	France	Valéry Giscard d'Estaing	Roy Jenkins	Strasbourg	web archive
15	1979	29–30 November	―	Ireland	Jack Lynch	Roy Jenkins	Dublin	web archive

=== 1980s ===
#	Year	Date	Type	EU Council presidency	President-in-Office	Commission President	Host city	Notes
16	1980	17–18 April	―	Italy	Francesco Cossiga	Roy Jenkins	Luxembourg	web archive
17	1980	12–13 June	―	Italy	Francesco Cossiga	Roy Jenkins	Venice	web archive
18	1980	1–2 December	―	Luxembourg	Pierre Werner	Roy Jenkins	Luxembourg	web archive
19	1981	23–24 March	―	Netherlands	Dries van Agt	Gaston Thorn	Maastricht	web archive
20	1981	29–30 June	―	Netherlands	Dries van Agt	Gaston Thorn	Luxembourg	web archive
21	1981	26–27 November	―	United Kingdom	Margaret Thatcher	Gaston Thorn	London	web archive
22	1982	29–30 March	―	Belgium	Wilfried Martens	Gaston Thorn	Brussels	web archive
23	1982	28–29 June	―	Belgium	Wilfried Martens	Gaston Thorn	Brussels	web archive
24	1982	3–4 December	―	Denmark	Poul Schlüter	Gaston Thorn	Copenhagen	web archive
25	1983	21–22 March	―	West Germany	Helmut Kohl	Gaston Thorn	Brussels	web archive
26	1983	17–19 June	―	West Germany	Helmut Kohl	Gaston Thorn	Stuttgart	web archive
27	1983	4–6 December	―	Greece	Andreas Papandreou	Gaston Thorn	Athens	web archive
28	1984	19–20 March	―	France	François Mitterrand	Gaston Thorn	Brussels	web archiveweb archive
29	1984	25–26 June	―	France	François Mitterrand	Gaston Thorn	Fontainebleau	British rebate agreed
30	1984	3–4 December	―	Ireland	Garret FitzGerald	Gaston Thorn	Dublin	web archive
31	1985	29–30 March	―	Italy	Bettino Craxi	Jacques Delors	Brussels	Initiated the IGC leading to the Single European Act
32	1985	28–29 June	―	Italy	Bettino Craxi	Jacques Delors	Milan	web archive
33	1985	2–3 December	―	Luxembourg	Jacques Santer	Jacques Delors	Luxembourg	web archive
34	1986	26–27 June	―	Netherlands	Ruud Lubbers	Jacques Delors	The Hague	web archive
35	1986	5–6 December	―	United Kingdom	Margaret Thatcher	Jacques Delors	London	web archive
36	1987	29–30 June	―	Belgium	Wilfried Martens	Jacques Delors	Brussels	web archive
37	1987	4–5 December	―	Denmark	Poul Schlüter	Jacques Delors	Copenhagen	web archive
38	1988	11–13 February	―	West Germany	Helmut Kohl	Jacques Delors	Brussels	web archive
39	1988	27–28 June	―	West Germany	Helmut Kohl	Jacques Delors	Hanover	web archive
40	1988	2–3 December	―	Greece	Andreas Papandreou	Jacques Delors	Rhodes	web archive
41	1989	26–27 June	―	Spain	Felipe González	Jacques Delors	Madrid	web archive
42	1989	18 November	Informal	France	François Mitterrand	Jacques Delors	Paris	web archive
43	1989	8–9 December	―	France	François Mitterrand	Jacques Delors	Strasbourg	webEuropean Council endorses German reunification despite some Anglo-French opposition.

=== 1990s ===
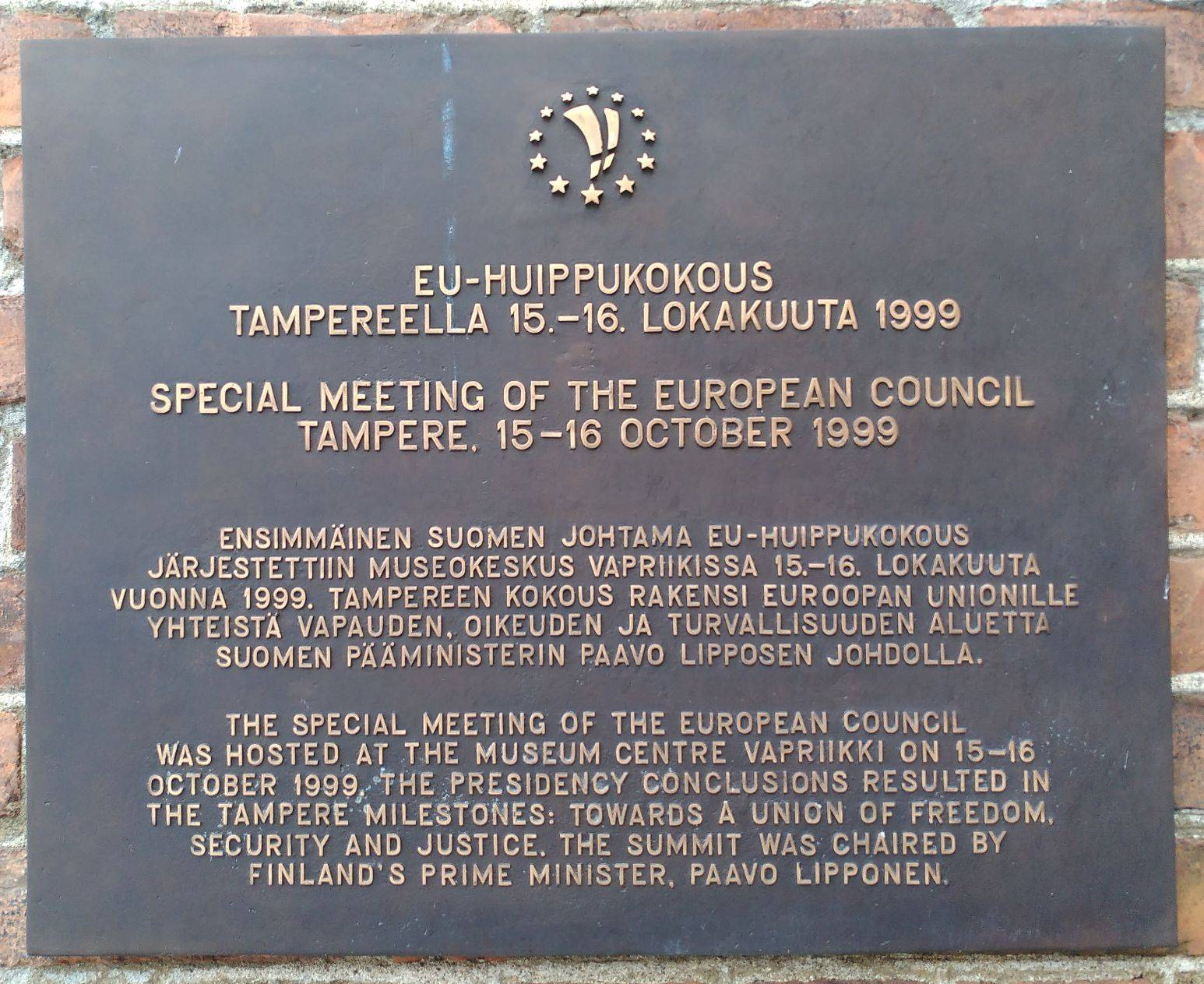
Plaque commemorating the 1999 European Council meeting in Tampere

#	Year	Date	Type	EU Council presidency	President-in-Office	Commission President	Host city	Notes
44	1990	28 April	Extraordinary	Ireland	Charles Haughey	Jacques Delors	Dublin	web archive
45	1990	25–26 June	―	Ireland	Charles Haughey	Jacques Delors	Dublin	web archive
46	1990	27–28 October	―	Italy	Giulio Andreotti	Jacques Delors	Rome	web archive
47	1990	14–15 December	―	Italy	Giulio Andreotti	Jacques Delors	Rome	web archive
48	1991	8 April	Informal	Luxembourg	Jacques Santer	Jacques Delors	Luxembourg	web archive
49	1991	28–29 June	―	Luxembourg	Jacques Santer	Jacques Delors	Luxembourg	web archive
50	1991	9–10 December	―	Netherlands	Ruud Lubbers	Jacques Delors	Maastricht	Signing of the Treaty of Maastricht
51	1992	27 June	―	Portugal	Aníbal Cavaco Silva	Jacques Delors	Lisbon	web archive
52	1992	16 October	―	United Kingdom	John Major	Jacques Delors	Birmingham	web archive
53	1992	11–12 December	―	United Kingdom	John Major	Jacques Delors	Edinburgh	web archive
54	1993	21–22 June	―	Denmark	Poul Nyrup Rasmussen	Jacques Delors	Copenhagen	web archive Copenhagen criteria agreed
55	1993	29 October	―	Belgium	Jean-Luc Dehaene	Jacques Delors	Brussels	web archive
56	1993	10–11 December	―	Belgium	Jean-Luc Dehaene	Jacques Delors	Brussels	web archive
57	1994	24–25 June	―	Greece	Andreas Papandreou	Jacques Delors	Corfu	Signing of the Accession Treaty of Austria, Finland, Sweden and Norway (Norway did not ratify)
58	1994	15 July	Extraordinary	Germany	Helmut Kohl	Jacques Delors	Brussels	web archive
59	1994	9–10 December	―	Germany	Helmut Kohl	Jacques Delors	Essen	web archive
60	1995	26–27 June	―	France	Jacques Chirac	Jacques Santer	Cannes	web archive
61	1995	22–23 October	Extraordinary	Spain	Felipe González	Jacques Santer	Mallorca	
62	1995	15–16 December	―	Spain	Felipe González	Jacques Santer	Madrid	web archive
63	1996	29 March	―	Italy	Lamberto Dini	Jacques Santer	Turin	web archive
64	1996	21–22 June	―	Italy	Romano Prodi	Jacques Santer	Florence	web archive
65	1996	5 October	Extraordinary	Ireland	John Bruton	Jacques Santer	Dublin	
66	1996	13–14 December	―	Ireland	John Bruton	Jacques Santer	Dublin	web archive
67	1997	23 May	Informal	Netherlands	Wim Kok	Jacques Santer	Noordwijk	
68	1997	16–17 June	―	Netherlands	Wim Kok	Jacques Santer	Amsterdam	Signed Treaty of Amsterdam
69	1997	20–21 November	Extraordinary	Luxembourg	Jean-Claude Juncker	Jacques Santer	Luxembourg	Extraordinary European Council on Employment
70	1997	12–13 December	―	Luxembourg	Jean-Claude Juncker	Jacques Santer	Luxembourg	
71	1998	3 May	Extraordinary	United Kingdom	Tony Blair	Jacques Santer	Brussels	Special Council on the Euro decides the 11 states which would enter the third stage of EMU
72	1998	15–16 June	―	United Kingdom	Tony Blair	Jacques Santer	Cardiff	web archive
73	1998	24–25 October	Informal	Austria	Viktor Klima	Jacques Santer	Pörtschach	
74	1998	11–12 December	―	Austria	Viktor Klima	Jacques Santer	Vienna	web archive
75	1999	26 February	Informal	Germany	Gerhard Schröder	Jacques Santer	Königswinter	
76	1999	24–25 March	―	Germany	Gerhard Schröder	Manuel Marin (Interim)	Berlin	web archive
77	1999	14 April	Informal	Germany	Gerhard Schröder	Manuel Marin (Interim)	Brussels	
78	1999	3–4 June	―	Germany	Gerhard Schröder	Manuel Marin (Interim)	Cologne	web archive Details below table
79	1999	15–16 October	Extraordinary	Finland	Paavo Lipponen	Romano Prodi	Tampere	Special meeting on justice and home affairs
80	1999	10–11 December	―	Finland	Paavo Lipponen	Romano Prodi	Helsinki	web archive

=== 2000s ===
#	Year	Date	Type	EU Council presidency	President-in-Office	Commission President	Host city	Notes
81	2000	23–24 March	―	Portugal	António Guterres	Romano Prodi	Lisbon	Agreed Lisbon Strategy
82	2000	19–20 June	―	Portugal	António Guterres	Romano Prodi	Santa Maria da Feira	Agreement to allow entry of Greece to the Eurozone
83	2000	13–14 October	Informal	France	Jacques Chirac	Romano Prodi	Biarritz	
84	2000	7–10 December	―	France	Jacques Chirac	Romano Prodi	Nice	Signed Treaty of Nice
85	2001	23–24 March	―	Sweden	Göran Persson	Romano Prodi	Stockholm	web archive
86	2001	15–16 June	―	Sweden	Göran Persson	Romano Prodi	Gothenburg	Enlargement, sustainable development, economic growth and structural reform, in addition to an EU-US summit
87	2001	21 September	Extraordinary	Belgium	Guy Verhofstadt	Romano Prodi	Brussels	Emergency council – Terrorism
88	2001	19 October	Informal	Belgium	Guy Verhofstadt	Romano Prodi	Ghent	web archive
89	2001	14–15 December	―	Belgium	Guy Verhofstadt	Romano Prodi	Laeken	web archive Details below table
90	2002	15–16 March	―	Spain	José María Aznar López	Romano Prodi	Barcelona	web archive
91	2002	21–22 June	―	Spain	José María Aznar López	Romano Prodi	Seville	Decided to reorganise the Council formations to achieve greater focus and efficiency
92	2002	24–25 October	―	Denmark	Anders Fogh Rasmussen	Romano Prodi	Brussels	web archive
93	2002	12–13 December	―	Denmark	Anders Fogh Rasmussen	Romano Prodi	Copenhagen	web archive
94	2003	17 February	Extraordinary	Greece	Costas Simitis	Romano Prodi	Brussels	Iraq crisis – Presidency conclusions
95	2003	20–21 March	―	Greece	Costas Simitis	Romano Prodi	Brussels	Presidency conclusions
96	2003	16 April	Informal	Greece	Costas Simitis	Romano Prodi	Athens	Signing of the Treaty of Accession 2003, Declaration on Iraq European Convention
97	2003	19–20 June	―	Greece	Costas Simitis	Romano Prodi	Thessaloniki	Presidency conclusions of the June 2003 meeting
98	2003	4 October	Extraordinary	Italy	Silvio Berlusconi	Romano Prodi	Rome	Beginning of IGC on EU Constitution
99	2003	16–17 October	―	Italy	Silvio Berlusconi	Romano Prodi	Brussels	Presidency conclusions of the October 2003 meeting
100	2003	12–13 December	―	Italy	Silvio Berlusconi	Romano Prodi	Brussels	Presidency conclusions of the December 2003 meeting
101	2004	25–26 March	―	Ireland	Bertie Ahern	Romano Prodi	Brussels	Declaration on combating terrorism Presidency conclusions of the March 2004 meeting
102	2004	17–18 June	―	Ireland	Bertie Ahern	Romano Prodi	Brussels	Presidency conclusions of the June 2004 meeting
103	2004	4–5 November	―	Netherlands	Jan Peter Balkenende	Romano Prodi	Brussels	Presidency conclusions of the November 2004 meeting
104	2004	16–17 December	―	Netherlands	Jan Peter Balkenende	José Manuel Barroso	Brussels	Presidency conclusions of the December 2004 meeting
105	2005	22–23 March	―	Luxembourg	Jean-Claude Juncker	José Manuel Barroso	Brussels	Presidency conclusions of the March 2005 meeting
106	2005	16–17 June	―	Luxembourg	Jean-Claude Juncker	José Manuel Barroso	Brussels	Declaration on the ratification of the Treaty establishing a Constitution for Europe; Presidency conclusions of the June 2005 meeting
107	2005	27 October	Informal	United Kingdom	Tony Blair	José Manuel Barroso	London	Globalisation
108	2005	15–16 December	―	United Kingdom	Tony Blair	José Manuel Barroso	Brussels	Presidency conclusions of the December 2005 meeting
109	2006	23–24 March	―	Austria	Wolfgang Schüssel	José Manuel Barroso	Brussels	Presidency conclusions of the March 2006 meeting
110	2006	15–16 June	―	Austria	Wolfgang Schüssel	José Manuel Barroso	Brussels	Agreement to allow entry of Slovenia to the Eurozone; Presidency conclusions of the June 2006 meeting
111	2006	20 October	Informal	Finland	Matti Vanhanen	José Manuel Barroso	Lahti	Meeting with Vladimir Putin held in Sibelius Hall
112	2006	14–15 December	―	Finland	Matti Vanhanen	José Manuel Barroso	Brussels	Presidency conclusions of the December 2006 meeting
113	2007	8–9 March	―	Germany	Angela Merkel	José Manuel Barroso	Brussels	Presidency conclusions of the March 2007 meeting
114	2007	21–22 June	―	Germany	Angela Merkel	José Manuel Barroso	Brussels	Agreement on basis for the Treaty of Lisbon; Agreement to allow entry of Malta and Cyprus to the Eurozone; Presidency conclusions of the June 2007 meeting
115	2007	18–19 October	Informal	Portugal	José Sócrates	José Manuel Barroso	Lisbon	Agreement reached on the Reform Treaty; Discussed climate change and the subprime mortgage financial crisis.
116	2007	14 December	―	Portugal	José Sócrates	José Manuel Barroso	Brussels	Signature of Reform Treaty in Lisbon on 13/12; European Council in Brussels the next day Presidency conclusions of the December 2007 meeting
117	2008	13–14 March	―	Slovenia	Janez Janša	José Manuel Barroso	Brussels	Agreed timeframe and principles of energy/climate change policy Presidency conclusions of the March 2008 meeting
118	2008	19–20 June	―	Slovenia	Janez Janša	José Manuel Barroso	Brussels	Presidency conclusions of the June 2008 meeting
119	2008	13–14 July	Extraordinary	France	Nicolas Sarkozy	José Manuel Barroso	Paris	Barcelona process for the Mediterranean
120	2008	1 September	Extraordinary	France	Nicolas Sarkozy	José Manuel Barroso	Brussels	Extraordinary summit on EU-Russia relations (Georgia crisis); Presidency conclusions of the September 2008 meeting
―	2008	12 October	Euro summit	France	Nicolas Sarkozy	José Manuel Barroso	Paris	Eurozone summit conclusions of October 2008 meeting
121	2008	15–16 October	―	France	Nicolas Sarkozy	José Manuel Barroso	Brussels	Presidency conclusions of the October 2008 meeting
122	2008	7 November	Informal	France	Nicolas Sarkozy	José Manuel Barroso	Brussels	Informal summit on the 2008 financial crisis Conclusions from meeting on the Global Financial Crisis
123	2008	11–12 December	―	France	Nicolas Sarkozy	José Manuel Barroso	Brussels	Presidency conclusions of the December 2008 meeting
124	2009	1 March	Informal	Czech Republic	Mirek Topolánek	José Manuel Barroso	Brussels	Informal summit on the 2008 financial crisis Conclusions of the Global Financial Crisis meeting on 1 March 2009
125	2009	19–20 March	―	Czech Republic	Mirek Topolánek	José Manuel Barroso	Brussels	Presidency conclusions of the March 2009 meeting
126	2009	5 April	Informal (EU-USA summit)	Czech Republic	Jan Fischer	José Manuel Barroso	Prague	US President Barack Obama in Prague; Conclusions of the EU-USA relations meeting in April 2009
127	2009	18–19 June	―	Czech Republic	Jan Fischer	José Manuel Barroso	Brussels	Icelandic application accepted Presidency conclusions of the June 2009 meeting Press conference video: 1 and 2
128	2009	17 September	Informal	Sweden	Fredrik Reinfeldt	José Manuel Barroso	Brussels	Preparation for the 2009 G-20 Pittsburgh summit Presidency conclusions of the September 2009 meeting Press conference video
129	2009	29–30 October	―	Sweden	Fredrik Reinfeldt	José Manuel Barroso	Brussels	Presidency conclusions of the October 2009 meeting Press conference video
130	2009	19 November	Informal	Sweden	Fredrik Reinfeldt	José Manuel Barroso	Brussels	Chose the first President of the European Council (Herman Van Rompuy) and the first High Representative of the Union for Foreign Affairs and Security Policy (Catherine Ashton); Presidency conclusions of the November 2009 meeting Press conference video
131	2009	10–11 December	—	Sweden	Fredrik Reinfeldt	José Manuel Barroso	Brussels	Presidency conclusions of the December 2009 meeting, Minutes; Press conference video: 1 and 2

=== 2010s ===
Since 2010, all formal (scheduled or extraordinary) European Council meetings have taken place in Brussels and been chaired by a permanent President, as introduced by the Treaty of Lisbon. In February 2010 the exact location was the Solvay Library, subsequent meetings took place at the Justus Lipsius building and since March 2017 at the Europa Building.

#	Year	Date	Type	EU Council presidency	Council President	Commission President	Agenda, Conclusions and Minutes	Press conference
132	2010	11 February	Informal	Spain	Herman Van Rompuy (1st term)	José Manuel Barroso (2nd term)	Statement.	Video
―	2010	25 March	Euro summit	Spain	Herman Van Rompuy (1st term)	José Manuel Barroso (2nd term)	Statement.	
133	2010	25–26 March	Scheduled	Spain	Herman Van Rompuy (1st term)	José Manuel Barroso (2nd term)	Conclusions, Minutes	Video: 1 and 2
―	2010	7 May	Euro summit	Spain	Herman Van Rompuy (1st term)	José Manuel Barroso (2nd term)	Statement.	Video
134	2010	17 June	Scheduled	Spain	Herman Van Rompuy (1st term)	José Manuel Barroso (2nd term)	Conclusions, Minutes	Video
135	2010	16 September	Extraordinary (special)	Belgium	Herman Van Rompuy (1st term)	José Manuel Barroso (2nd term)	Conclusions, Minutes, (note: the Ministers of Foreign Affairs were also present in this special European Council)	Video
136	2010	28–29 October	Scheduled	Belgium	Herman Van Rompuy (1st term)	José Manuel Barroso (2nd term)	Conclusions, Minutes	Video: 1 and 2
137	2010	16–17 December	Scheduled	Belgium	Herman Van Rompuy (1st term)	José Manuel Barroso (2nd term)	Conclusions, Minutes	Video
138	2011	4 February	Scheduled	Hungary	Herman Van Rompuy (1st term)	José Manuel Barroso (2nd term)	Conclusions, Minutes	Video
―	2011	11 March	Euro summit	Hungary	Herman Van Rompuy (1st term)	José Manuel Barroso (2nd term)	Statement.	Video
139	2011	11 March	Extraordinary	Hungary	Herman Van Rompuy (1st term)	José Manuel Barroso (2nd term)	Declaration on EU policy for actions in Libya and the Southern Neighbourhood region, Minutes	Video
140	2011	24–25 March	Scheduled	Hungary	Herman Van Rompuy (1st term)	José Manuel Barroso (2nd term)	Conclusions, Minutes	Video: 1 and 2
141	2011	23–24 June	Scheduled	Hungary	Herman Van Rompuy (1st term)	José Manuel Barroso (2nd term)	Website, Conclusions, Minutes and corrigendum	Video: 1 and 2
―	2011	21 July	Euro summit	Poland	Herman Van Rompuy (1st term)	José Manuel Barroso (2nd term)	Statement.	Video
142	2011	23 October	Scheduled	Poland	Herman Van Rompuy (1st term)	José Manuel Barroso (2nd term)	Conclusions, Minutes	Video
―	2011	23–26 October	Euro summit	Poland	Herman Van Rompuy (1st term)	José Manuel Barroso (2nd term)	Statement.	Video: 1 and 2
143	2011	26 October	Informal	Poland	Herman Van Rompuy (1st term)	José Manuel Barroso (2nd term)	Website, Statement.	
144	2011	9 December	Scheduled	Poland	Herman Van Rompuy (1st term)	José Manuel Barroso (2nd term)	Website, Conclusions, Minutes	Video: 1 and 2
―	2011	9 December	Euro summit	Poland	Herman Van Rompuy (1st term)	José Manuel Barroso (2nd term)	Statement	
―	2012	30 January	Euro summit	Denmark	Herman Van Rompuy (1st term)	José Manuel Barroso (2nd term)	Agreed lines of communication.	
145	2012	30 January	Informal	Denmark	Herman Van Rompuy (1st term)	José Manuel Barroso (2nd term)	Website, Statement on growth and jobs, Growth and competitiveness, Foreign policy issues, Fiscal discipline and convergence, Treaty on Stability, Coordination and Governance.	Video
146	2012	1–2 March	Scheduled	Denmark	Herman Van Rompuy (1st term)	José Manuel Barroso (2nd term)	Website, Conclusions, Implementation of the European Semester, Fiscal Compact signed, Van Rompuy re-elected president, Minutes and corrigendum	Video: 1 and 2
―	2012	2 March	Euro summit	Denmark	Herman Van Rompuy (1st term)	José Manuel Barroso (2nd term)	Statement.	
147	2012	23 May	Informal	Denmark	Herman Van Rompuy (1st term)	José Manuel Barroso (2nd term)	Website 1 and 2, Greece: euro area press lines, Tackling youth unemployment.	Video
148	2012	28–29 June	Scheduled	Denmark	Herman Van Rompuy (2nd term)	José Manuel Barroso (2nd term)	Website, Conclusions, Towards a genuine EMU (Council edition), European Council programme July 2012 to Dec.2014, Minutes	Video: 1 and 2
―	2012	28–29 June	Euro summit	Denmark	Herman Van Rompuy (2nd term)	José Manuel Barroso (2nd term)	Statement	Video
149	2012	18–19 October	Scheduled	Cyprus	Herman Van Rompuy (2nd term)	José Manuel Barroso (2nd term)	Website, Conclusions, Conclusions on completing EMU, Towards a genuine EMU (interim report), Statement on Greece, Minutes	Video: 1 and 2
150	2012	22‑23 November	Extraordinary	Cyprus	Herman Van Rompuy (2nd term)	José Manuel Barroso (2nd term)	Website, Statement on EU's Multiannual Financial Framework 2014–20, Minutes	Video
151	2012	13–14 December	Scheduled	Cyprus	Herman Van Rompuy (2nd term)	José Manuel Barroso (2nd term)	Website, Conclusions, Conclusions on completing EMU, Towards a genuine EMU (final report), Agreed position on bank supervision (SSM), Minutes	Video 1 and 2
152	2013	7–8 February	Scheduled	Ireland	Herman Van Rompuy (2nd term)	José Manuel Barroso (2nd term)	Website, Conclusions, Multiannual Financial Framework.	Video
―	2013	14 March	Euro summit	Ireland	Herman Van Rompuy (2nd term)	José Manuel Barroso (2nd term)	New procedure rules for Euro summits, Presidential Remarks	
153	2013	14–15 March	Scheduled	Ireland	Herman Van Rompuy (2nd term)	José Manuel Barroso (2nd term)	Website, Conclusions.	Video: 1 and 2
154	2013	22 May	Scheduled	Ireland	Herman Van Rompuy (2nd term)	José Manuel Barroso (2nd term)	Website, Conclusions (Taxation and Energy), EC member numbers.	Video
155	2013	27–28 June	Scheduled	Ireland	Herman Van Rompuy (2nd term)	José Manuel Barroso (2nd term)	Website, Conclusions, EP in 2014–19, Genuine EMU.	Video: 1 and 2
156	2013	24–25 October	Scheduled	Lithuania	Herman Van Rompuy (2nd term)	José Manuel Barroso (2nd term)	Website, Conclusions.	Video: 1 and 2
157	2013	19–20 December	Scheduled	Lithuania	Herman Van Rompuy (2nd term)	José Manuel Barroso (2nd term)	Website, Conclusions, Security & Defense conclusions.	Video: 1 and 2
158	2014	6 March	Extraordinary	Greece	Herman Van Rompuy (2nd term)	José Manuel Barroso (2nd term)	Website (EU stands by Ukraine), Statement on Ukraine.	Video and photo gallery
159	2014	20–21 March	Scheduled	Greece	Herman Van Rompuy (2nd term)	José Manuel Barroso (2nd term)	Website, Conclusions, Conclusions on Ukraine, EU sanctions against Russia, Signing of EU-Ukraine Association Agreement.	Video: 1 and 2
160	2014	27 May	Informal	Greece	Herman Van Rompuy (2nd term)	José Manuel Barroso (2nd term)	Website, Statement on Ukraine.	Video
161	2014	26–27 June	Scheduled	Greece	Herman Van Rompuy (2nd term)	José Manuel Barroso (2nd term)	Website, Conclusions, Conclusions on Ukraine, Strategic agenda for the Union, World War I commemoration, Signing of Association Agreements with Georgia, Moldova and Ukraine.	Video
162	2014	16 July	Extraordinary	Italy	Herman Van Rompuy (2nd term)	José Manuel Barroso (2nd term)	Website, Conclusions, Conclusions on Ukraine and Gaza.	Video
163	2014	30 August	Extraordinary	Italy	Herman Van Rompuy (2nd term)	José Manuel Barroso (2nd term)	Website, Conclusions, Nomination of next European Council president and Foreign Affairs High Representative, Sanctions against Russia over Ukraine crisis.	Video: 1 and 2, Ukrainian President 1a and 1b
164	2014	23–24 October	Scheduled	Italy	Herman Van Rompuy (2nd term)	José Manuel Barroso (2nd term)	Website, Conclusions, New Commission appointed, 2030 climate and energy policy framework, EU response on Ebola.	Video: 1 and 2
―	2014	24 October	Euro summit	Italy	Herman Van Rompuy (2nd term)	José Manuel Barroso (2nd term)	Statement	
165	2014	18 December	Scheduled	Italy	Donald Tusk (1st term)	Jean-Claude Juncker	Website, Conclusions, Crimea and Sevastopol: further EU sanctions.	Video
166	2015	12 February	Informal	Latvia	Donald Tusk (1st term)	Jean-Claude Juncker	Website, Results of the informal meeting, Statement on the fight against terrorism, Next Steps on Better Economic Governance in the Euro Area (analytical note), Remarks about Ukrainian ceasefire.	Video, Ukrainian ceasefire agreement
167	2015	19–20 March	Scheduled	Latvia	Donald Tusk (1st term)	Jean-Claude Juncker	Website, Conclusions, Energy Union, Relations with Russia, European Semester 2015, Statement on Tunisia, Statement on Greece.	Video: 1 and 2
168	2015	23 April	Extraordinary	Latvia	Donald Tusk (1st term)	Jean-Claude Juncker	Website, Statement, 10 point action plan to combat Mediterranean migratory pressures, Minutes	Video
—	2015	22 June	Euro summit	Latvia	Donald Tusk (1st term)	Jean-Claude Juncker	Website, Presidential remarks 1 and 2	Video
169	2015	25–26 June	Scheduled	Latvia	Donald Tusk (1st term)	Jean-Claude Juncker	Website, Conclusions, European Fund for Strategic Investments, Completing Europe's Economic and Monetary Union.	Video: 1 and 2
—	2015	7 July	Euro summit	Luxembourg	Donald Tusk (1st term)	Jean-Claude Juncker	Website, Preparing Eurogroup meeting, Presidential Remarks	Video
—	2015	12 July	Euro summit	Luxembourg	Donald Tusk (1st term)	Jean-Claude Juncker	Website, Eurogroup meeting, Presidential Remarks, Statement	Video
170	2015	23 September	Informal	Luxembourg	Donald Tusk (1st term)	Jean-Claude Juncker	Website, Presidential Remarks, Statement	Video
171	2015	15 October	Scheduled	Luxembourg	Donald Tusk (1st term)	Jean-Claude Juncker	Website, Conclusions	
172	2015	12 November	Informal	Luxembourg	Donald Tusk (1st term)	Jean-Claude Juncker	Website, Presidential Remarks	
173	2015	17‑18 December	Scheduled	Luxembourg	Donald Tusk (1st term)	Jean-Claude Juncker	Website, Conclusions	
174	2016	18‑19 February	Scheduled	Netherlands	Donald Tusk (1st term)	Jean-Claude Juncker	Website, Conclusions	
175	2016	17–18 March	Scheduled	Netherlands	Donald Tusk (1st term)	Jean-Claude Juncker	Website, Conclusions, Minutes and corrigendum	
176	2016	28 June	Scheduled (postponed due to Brexit Referendum)	Netherlands	Donald Tusk (1st term)	Jean-Claude Juncker	Website, Conclusions, Minutes	
176	2016	29 June	Informal^{without UK}	Netherlands	Donald Tusk (1st term)	Jean-Claude Juncker	Website, Statement	
177	2016	16 September	Informal^{without UK}	Slovakia	Donald Tusk (1st term)	Jean-Claude Juncker	Website, Declaration and Roadmap	
178	2016	20–21 October	Scheduled	Slovakia	Donald Tusk (1st term)	Jean-Claude Juncker	Website, Conclusions	
179	2016	15 December	Scheduled	Slovakia	Donald Tusk (1st term)	Jean-Claude Juncker	Website, Conclusions	
180	2017	3 February, a.m.	Informal	Malta	Donald Tusk (1st term)	Jean-Claude Juncker	Website, Statement and remarks	
180	2017	3 February, p.m.	Informal^{without UK}	Malta	Donald Tusk (1st term)	Jean-Claude Juncker	Website: "Main results: Preparations for the 60th anniversary of the Rome Treaties"	
181	2017	9 March	Scheduled	Malta	Donald Tusk (1st term)	Jean-Claude Juncker	Website, Conclusions by the President, Minutes	
181	2017	10 March	Informal^{without UK}	Malta	Donald Tusk (1st term)	Jean-Claude Juncker	Website: "Informal meeting"	
182	2017	29 April	Extraordinary^{without UK}	Malta	Donald Tusk (1st term)	Jean-Claude Juncker	Website, European Council (Art. 50) guidelines for Brexit negotiations, Minutes	
183	2017	22–23 June	Scheduled	Malta	Donald Tusk (2nd term)	Jean-Claude Juncker	Website, Annotated agenda, Conclusions	
183	2017	22 June, evening	Extraordinary^{without UK}	Malta	Donald Tusk (2nd term)	Jean-Claude Juncker	Website, Annotated agenda, Decision by Heads of State and Government: Procedure leading up to a decision on the relocation of the EMA and the EBA in the context of the UK's withdrawal from the Union	
184	2017	19–20 October	Scheduled	Estonia	Donald Tusk (2nd term)	Jean-Claude Juncker	Website, Conclusions	
184	2017	20 October	Extraordinary^{without UK}	Estonia	Donald Tusk (2nd term)	Jean-Claude Juncker	Website	
185	2017	17 November	Informal	Estonia	Donald Tusk (2nd term)	Jean-Claude Juncker	Website	
186	2017	14–15 December	Scheduled	Estonia	Donald Tusk (2nd term)	Jean-Claude Juncker	Website, Conclusions	
186	2017	15 December	Euro Summit	Estonia	Donald Tusk (2nd term)	Jean-Claude Juncker	Website, Presidential Remarks	
186	2017	15 December	Extraordinary^{without UK}	Estonia	Donald Tusk (2nd term)	Jean-Claude Juncker	Outcome: guidelines for Brexit negotiations	
187	2018	22–23 March	Scheduled	Bulgaria	Donald Tusk (2nd term)	Jean-Claude Juncker	Website, Conclusions	
187	2018	23 March	Scheduled^{without UK}	Bulgaria	Donald Tusk (2nd term)	Jean-Claude Juncker	Website	
187	2018	23 March	Euro Summit	Bulgaria	Donald Tusk (2nd term)	Jean-Claude Juncker	Website	
188	2018	28–29 June	Scheduled	Bulgaria	Donald Tusk (2nd term)	Jean-Claude Juncker	Website, Conclusions	
188	2018	29 June	Extraordinary^{without UK}	Bulgaria	Donald Tusk (2nd term)	Jean-Claude Juncker	Conclusions	
188	2018	29 June	Euro Summit	Bulgaria	Donald Tusk (2nd term)	Jean-Claude Juncker	Website, Statement	
189	2018	19–20 September	Informal	Austria	Donald Tusk (2nd term)	Jean-Claude Juncker	Website	
189	2018	20 September	Informal^{without UK}	Austria	Donald Tusk (2nd term)	Jean-Claude Juncker	Website	
190	2018	17 October	Extraordinary^{without UK}	Austria	Donald Tusk (2nd term)	Jean-Claude Juncker	Website	
190	2018	18 October, a.m.	Scheduled	Austria	Donald Tusk (2nd term)	Jean-Claude Juncker	Website	
190	2018	18 October, p.m.	Euro Summit	Austria	Donald Tusk (2nd term)	Jean-Claude Juncker	Website	
191	2018	13–14 December	Scheduled	Austria	Donald Tusk (2nd term)	Jean-Claude Juncker	Website	
191	2018	13 December	Extraordinary^{without UK}	Austria	Donald Tusk (2nd term)	Jean-Claude Juncker	Website	
191	2018	14 December	Euro Summit	Austria	Donald Tusk (2nd term)	Jean-Claude Juncker	Website, Statement	
192	2019	21 March	Extraordinary^{without UK}	Romania	Donald Tusk (2nd term)	Jean-Claude Juncker	Website, European Council Decision (EU) 2019/476 taken in agreement with the United Kingdom of 22 March 2019 extending the period under Article 50(3) TEU, Conclusions	
192	2019	22 March	Scheduled	Romania	Donald Tusk (2nd term)	Jean-Claude Juncker	Website, Conclusions	
193	2019	10 April	Extraordinary^{without UK}	Romania	Donald Tusk (2nd term)	Jean-Claude Juncker	Website, European Council Decision (EU) 2019/584 taken in agreement with the United Kingdom of 11 April 2019 extending the period under Article 50(3) TEU, Conclusions	
194	2019	9 May	Informal	Romania	Donald Tusk (2nd term)	Jean-Claude Juncker	Website	
195	2019	28 May	Informal	Romania	Donald Tusk (2nd term)	Jean-Claude Juncker	Website	
196	2019	20 June	Scheduled	Romania	Donald Tusk (2nd term)	Jean-Claude Juncker	Website, Conclusions	
196	2019	21 June	Euro Summit	Romania	Donald Tusk (2nd term)	Jean-Claude Juncker	Website, Statement	
196	2019	21 June	Extraordinary^{without UK}	Romania	Donald Tusk (2nd term)	Jean-Claude Juncker	Website (see heading "Brexit")	
197	2019	30 June–2 July	Extraordinary	Romania & Finland	Donald Tusk (2nd term)	Jean-Claude Juncker	Website, Conclusions (nominations for President of the European Council, President of the Commission, High Representative of the Union for Foreign Affairs and Security Policy and President of the European Central Bank)	
198	2019	17 October	Extraordinary^{without UK}	Finland	Donald Tusk (2nd term)	Jean-Claude Juncker	Website, Conclusions	
198	2019	17–18 October	Scheduled	Finland	Donald Tusk (2nd term)	Jean-Claude Juncker	Website, Conclusions	
199	2019	12–13 December	Scheduled	Finland	Charles Michel	Ursula von der Leyen (1st term)	Website, Conclusions	
199	2019	13 December	Euro Summit	Finland	Charles Michel	Ursula von der Leyen (1st term)	Website, Statement	
199	2019	13 December	Extraordinary^{without UK}	Finland	Charles Michel	Ursula von der Leyen (1st term)	Website, Conclusions	

=== 2020s ===
#	Year	Date	Type	EU Council presidency	Council President	Commission President	Agenda, Conclusions, Declarations, Statements
200	2020	20–21 February	Extraordinary	Croatia	Charles Michel	Ursula von der Leyen (1st term)	Website
201	2020	10 March	Extraordinary (Informal video conference)	Croatia	Charles Michel	Ursula von der Leyen (1st term)	Website
202	2020	17 March	Extraordinary (Informal video conference)	Croatia	Charles Michel	Ursula von der Leyen (1st term)	Website
203	2020	26 March	Informal (informal video conference - replacing scheduled meeting)	Croatia	Charles Michel	Ursula von der Leyen (1st term)	Website, Statement
204	2020	23 April	Extraordinary (Informal video conference)	Croatia	Charles Michel	Ursula von der Leyen (1st term)	Website
205	2020	19 June	Informal (informal video conference - replacing scheduled meeting)	Croatia	Charles Michel	Ursula von der Leyen (1st term)	Website
206	2020	17–21 July	Extraordinary	Germany	Charles Michel	Ursula von der Leyen (1st term)	Website, Conclusions
207	2020	19 August	Extraordinary (Informal video conference)	Germany	Charles Michel	Ursula von der Leyen (1st term)	Website
208	2020	1–2 October	Extraordinary	Germany	Charles Michel	Ursula von der Leyen (1st term)	Website, Conclusions
209	2020	15–16 October	Scheduled	Germany	Charles Michel	Ursula von der Leyen (1st term)	Website, Conclusions
210	2020	29 October	Extraordinary (Informal video conference)	Germany	Charles Michel	Ursula von der Leyen (1st term)	Website
211	2020	19 November	Extraordinary (Informal video conference)	Germany	Charles Michel	Ursula von der Leyen (1st term)	Website
212	2020	10–11 December	Scheduled	Germany	Charles Michel	Ursula von der Leyen (1st term)	Website, Conclusions
―	2020	11 December	Euro summit	Germany	Charles Michel	Ursula von der Leyen (1st term)	Website, Statement
213	2021	21 January	Extraordinary (Informal video conference)	Portugal	Charles Michel	Ursula von der Leyen (1st term)	Website
214	2021	25–26 February	Extraordinary (Informal video conference)	Portugal	Charles Michel	Ursula von der Leyen (1st term)	Website, Statement
―	2021	25 March	Euro summit (Informal video conference)	Portugal	Charles Michel	Ursula von der Leyen (1st term)	Website, Statement
215	2021	25–26 March	Informal (Informal video conference - replacing scheduled meeting)	Portugal	Charles Michel	Ursula von der Leyen (1st term)	Website, Statement
―	2021	7 May	Tripartite Social Summit	Portugal	Charles Michel	Ursula von der Leyen (1st term)	Website, Statement
216	2021	7–8 May	Informal	Portugal	Charles Michel	Ursula von der Leyen (1st term)	Website, Declaration
217	2021	24–25 May	Extraordinary	Portugal	Charles Michel	Ursula von der Leyen (1st term)	Website, Conclusions
218	2021	24–25 June	Scheduled	Portugal	Charles Michel	Ursula von der Leyen (1st term)	Website, Conclusions
―	2021	25 June	Euro summit	Portugal	Charles Michel	Ursula von der Leyen (1st term)	Website, Statement
219	2021	5 October	Informal	Slovenia	Charles Michel	Ursula von der Leyen (1st term)	Website
―	2021	20 October	Tripartite Social Summit	Slovenia	Charles Michel	Ursula von der Leyen (1st term)	Website, Main Messages
220	2021	21–22 October	Scheduled	Slovenia	Charles Michel	Ursula von der Leyen (1st term)	Website, Conclusions
221	2021	16 December	Scheduled	Slovenia	Charles Michel	Ursula von der Leyen (1st term)	Website, Conclusions
―	2021	16 December	Euro summit	Slovenia	Charles Michel	Ursula von der Leyen (1st term)	Website, Statement
222	2022	17 February	Informal	France	Charles Michel	Ursula von der Leyen (1st term)	Website
223	2022	24 February	Extraordinary	France	Charles Michel	Ursula von der Leyen (1st term)	Website, Conclusions
224	2022	10–11 March	Informal	France	Charles Michel	Ursula von der Leyen (1st term)	Website, Declaration
―	2022	23 March	Tripartite Social Summit	France	Charles Michel	Ursula von der Leyen (1st term)	Website, Main messages
225	2022	24–25 March	Scheduled	France	Charles Michel	Ursula von der Leyen (1st term)	Website, Conclusions
226	2022	30–31 May	Extraordinary	France	Charles Michel	Ursula von der Leyen (1st term)	Website, Conclusions
227	2022	23–24 June	Scheduled	France	Charles Michel	Ursula von der Leyen (1st term)	Website, Conclusions
―	2022	24 June	Euro summit	France	Charles Michel	Ursula von der Leyen (1st term)	Website, Statement
228	2022	7 October	Informal	Czech Republic	Charles Michel	Ursula von der Leyen (1st term)	Website, Remarks
―	2022	19 October	Tripartite Social Summit	Czech Republic	Charles Michel	Ursula von der Leyen (1st term)	Website, Main messages
229	2022	20–21 October	Scheduled	Czech Republic	Charles Michel	Ursula von der Leyen (1st term)	Website, Conclusions
230	2022	15 December	Scheduled	Czech Republic	Charles Michel	Ursula von der Leyen (1st term)	Website, Conclusions
231	2023	9 February	Extraordinary	Sweden	Charles Michel	Ursula von der Leyen (1st term)	Website, Conclusions
―	2023	22 March	Tripartite Social Summit	Sweden	Charles Michel	Ursula von der Leyen (1st term)	Website, Main Messages
232	2023	23 March	Scheduled	Sweden	Charles Michel	Ursula von der Leyen (1st term)	Website, Conclusions
―	2023	24 March	Euro summit	Sweden	Charles Michel	Ursula von der Leyen (1st term)	Website, Statement
233	2023	29–30 June	Scheduled	Sweden	Charles Michel	Ursula von der Leyen (1st term)	Website, Conclusions
234	2023	6 October	Informal	Spain	Charles Michel	Ursula von der Leyen (1st term)	Website, Declaration
235	2023	17 October	Extraordinary (video conference)	Spain	Charles Michel	Ursula von der Leyen (1st term)	Website, Statement
―	2023	25 October	Tripartite Social Summit	Spain	Charles Michel	Ursula von der Leyen (1st term)	Website, Main Messages
236	2023	26–27 October	Scheduled	Spain	Charles Michel	Ursula von der Leyen (1st term)	Website, Conclusions
―	2023	27 October	Euro summit	Spain	Charles Michel	Ursula von der Leyen (1st term)	Website, Statement
237	2023	14–15 December	Scheduled	Spain	Charles Michel	Ursula von der Leyen (1st term)	Website, Conclusions
238	2024	1 February	Extraordinary	Belgium	Charles Michel	Ursula von der Leyen (1st term)	Website, Conclusions
―	2024	20 March	Tripartite Social Summit	Belgium	Charles Michel	Ursula von der Leyen (1st term)	Website, Main Messages
239	2024	21–22 March	Scheduled	Belgium	Charles Michel	Ursula von der Leyen (1st term)	Website, Conclusions
―	2024	22 March	Euro summit	Belgium	Charles Michel	Ursula von der Leyen (1st term)	Website, Statement
240	2024	17–18 April	Extraordinary	Belgium	Charles Michel	Ursula von der Leyen (1st term)	Website, Conclusions
241	2024	17 June	Informal	Belgium	Charles Michel	Ursula von der Leyen (1st term)	Website
242	2024	27 June	Scheduled	Belgium	Charles Michel	Ursula von der Leyen (1st term)	Website, Conclusions
243	2024	17 October	Scheduled	Hungary	Charles Michel	Ursula von der Leyen (1st term)	Website, Conclusions
244	2024	7–8 November	Informal	Hungary	Charles Michel	Ursula von der Leyen (1st term)	Website, Declaration
245	2024	19 December	Scheduled	Hungary	António Costa	Ursula von der Leyen (2nd term)	Website, Conclusions
246	2025	3 February	Informal (EU-UK defence meeting)	Poland	António Costa	Ursula von der Leyen (2nd term)	Website
247	2025	6 March	Extraordinary (EU defence & Ukraine)	Poland	António Costa	Ursula von der Leyen (2nd term)	Website, Conclusions, Ukraine support
―	2025	19 March	Tripartite Social Summit	Poland	António Costa	Ursula von der Leyen (2nd term)	Website, Main Messages
―	2025	20 March	Euro summit	Poland	António Costa	Ursula von der Leyen (2nd term)	Website, Statement
248	2025	20 March	Scheduled	Poland	António Costa	Ursula von der Leyen (2nd term)	Website, Conclusions, Ukraine support
249	2025	26 June	Scheduled	Poland	António Costa	Ursula von der Leyen (2nd term)	Website
250	2025	19 August	Extraordinary (Ukraine)	Denmark	António Costa	Ursula von der Leyen (2nd term)	Website
251	2025	1 October	Informal	Denmark	António Costa	Ursula von der Leyen (2nd term)	Website
252	2025	23 October	Scheduled	Denmark	António Costa	Ursula von der Leyen (2nd term)	Website
253	2025	24 November	Extraordinary (Ukraine)	Denmark	António Costa	Ursula von der Leyen (2nd term)	Website
254	2025	18–19 December	Scheduled	Denmark	António Costa	Ursula von der Leyen (2nd term)	Website
255	2026	22 January	Informal	Cyprus	António Costa	Ursula von der Leyen (2nd term)	Website
256	2026	12 February	Informal	Cyprus	António Costa	Ursula von der Leyen (2nd term)	Website
257	2026	19 March	Scheduled	Cyprus	António Costa	Ursula von der Leyen (2nd term)	Website
258	2026	23–24 April	Informal	Cyprus	António Costa	Ursula von der Leyen (2nd term)	Website
259	2026	18–19 June	Scheduled	Cyprus	António Costa	Ursula von der Leyen (2nd term)	Website
260	2026	15-16 October	Scheduled	Ireland	António Costa	Ursula von der Leyen (2nd term)	Website
261	2026	13 November	Informal	Ireland	António Costa	Ursula von der Leyen (2nd term)	Website
262	2026	26-27 November	Extraordinary (MFF)	Ireland	António Costa	Ursula von der Leyen (2nd term)	Website
263	2026	17 December	Scheduled	Ireland	António Costa	Ursula von der Leyen (2nd term)	Website
264	2027	5 February	Informal	Lithuania	António Costa	Ursula von der Leyen (2nd term)	Website
265	2027	18-19 March	Scheduled	Lithuania	António Costa	Ursula von der Leyen (2nd term)	Website
266	2027	13-14 May	Informal	Lithuania	António Costa	Ursula von der Leyen (2nd term)	Website
267	2027	17-18 June	Scheduled	Lithuania	António Costa	Ursula von der Leyen (2nd term)	Website

Upcoming meetings
- External link for upcoming meetings

== Notable details ==
=== Cologne 1999 ===
The European Council met in Cologne, Germany, on 3–4 June 1999 to consider issues after the Treaty of Amsterdam came into force. Romano Prodi presented his plan for the future Commission's work and reform program. The Council called for an EU Charter of Fundamental Rights.

The Council designated Javier Solana for the post of Secretary-General of the Council of the European Union (with Pierre de Boissieu as his deputy) and High Representative for the Common Foreign and Security Policy (CFSP). It decided on a common policy on Russia (first use of the CFSP). Adopted the declaration on Kosovo. In relation to the European Security and Defence Policy, a major element of the CFSP, the council declared that the EU "must have the capacity for autonomous action, backed up by credible military forces, the means to decide to use them, and a readiness to do so, in order to respond to international crises without prejudice to actions by NATO".

=== Gothenburg 2001 ===
The 2001 meeting of the European Council was held in the Swedish city of Gothenburg, from 14 to 16 June.

The EU Summit focused upon EU enlargement, sustainable development, economic growth and structural reform issues. The EU–US summit included a visit by U.S. president George W. Bush on 14 June. It was the first U.S. presidential visit to Sweden, and was intended as an opportunity to discuss differences on climate negotiations, WTO and Middle East issues with the EU leaders. It was marred by extensive demonstrations.

The main protests were organised by three broad coalitions, a local coalition Bush Go home that opposed U.S. foreign policy, a Sweden-based coalition Network Gothenburg 2001 which opposed Swedish membership in the EU and EMU and an international coalition Gothenburg Action 2001, a proponent of "another Europe", opponent of EU militarisation, the Schengen Agreement, and defending the public sector and the environment from becoming trade commodities and EMU. There was also a broad Iranian and a smaller anti-capitalist coalition as well as non-violent networks and Reclaim the Streets organising demonstrations and a street party.

According to the police, more than 50,000 demonstrators gathered in Gothenburg during the three days of the summit, among them a smaller number with foreign nationality. The demonstrating organisations arranged many conferences, the biggest conference (besides, of course, the EU summit itself) being Fritt forum (Free Forum) which hosted 50 lectures and seminars and was funded by the city of Gothenburg, the Swedish justice department and Sweden's foreign ministry department among others. The summit was guarded by approximately 2500 police officers.

Besides a number of encounters and skirmishes there were a number of riots. The first one occurred on 14 June after the police had surrounded and enclosed the Hvitfeldtska gymnasiet where demonstrators had been invited by the city to stay during the summit. The second occurred in the morning of 15 June in conjunction with a demonstration of 2000 participants organised by the anti-capitalist organisation, and it resulted in violent clashes with the police and damage of Gothenburg's main street Kungsportsavenyn. Later in the evening during the Reclaim the City demonstration, a police unit came under attack by demonstrators throwing projectiles. The police subsequently fired shots at the demonstrators. Three persons were injured by gunshots, one of whom was seriously injured. This was the first use of firearms against Swedish demonstrators since the Ådalen shootings in 1931.

The riots were followed by prison sentences for 64 persons convicted of criminal behaviour. In total demonstrators were sent to prison for almost 50 years. As of 2006, no police officer has been convicted of wrongdoing during the summit. One officer was tried and convicted for committing perjury during a trial against a Gothenburg demonstrator.

The riots left large areas of central Gothenburg demolished due to the violent protests of the demonstrators, as well as leaving many stores looted.

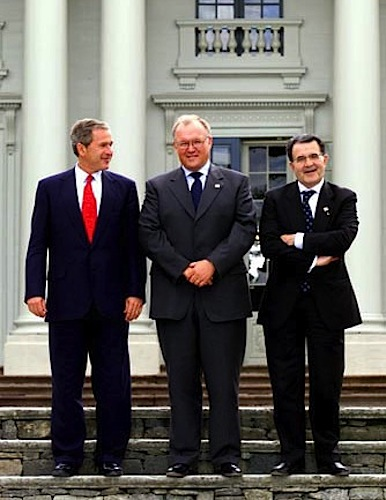
Göran Persson (in the middle) with George W. Bush and Romano Prodi in Gothenburg, 14 June 2001.

The summit meeting of the European Union was notable because heads of states from the EU gathered in Gothenburg, and also because the American President George W. Bush visited Sweden for the first time on the day before the summit meeting. As a reaction to this, protesters from all over the world planned to gather in Gothenburg to demonstrate under different banners. The City of Gothenburg assisted the out-of-town protesters by providing living quarters in different schools around Gothenburg and a convergence center, first at Hvitfeldtska gymnasiet and later moved to Schillerska Gymnasiet.

The political background to the protests was a conjuncture of three forces. EU-criticism and opposition to membership in the EU was stronger in Sweden than anywhere else in the union. Secondly a wave of globalisation protests against neoliberalism had gained momentum after the protests during the EU Summit in Amsterdam 1997 and the WTO meeting in Seattle 1999. Anti-war and environmental concerns against the U.S. was a third factor.

The police planned and gathered their forces in anticipation of the meeting. Never before had this many heads of state met in Sweden, and thousands of police were to stand guard in Gothenburg to keep order during these three days of June 2001. The police had long prepared for disturbances and also had many different intelligence services directed at the groups participating in the planning of demonstrations. There were differing opinions amongst the police forces involved. The security police did not want the Hvitfeldtska gymnasiet to be used as they felt it was too close to the EU Summit while the Gothenburg police insisted on having the demonstrators there. American police tactics against protesters were in use such as a psycho-tactic unit that was supposed to have a dialogue with demonstrating organisations.

The police, the local authority and the different demonstration coalitions had arranged a dialogue group where they planned and discussed the demonstrations to ensure they would be as peaceful as possible.

The officers in command of the action stated that they were very pleased with how the police had served during the summit (an opinion which at the time was shared by the government). It was claimed that the police successfully had used advance information about demonstrators and undercover police officers among the demonstrators to among other things find out about the "secret" information central.

According to the police, they acted completely in accordance with the Police Law.

The Swedish Police Union strongly criticised the way the police actions had been led and managed. In its report "Chaos" – regarding the Command in Gothenburg in June 2001 it is stated that a majority of the police who were on duty during the time felt they did not have enough resources to carry out their duties in a proper manner and that orders were confusing.

Statistics:

- Crimes reported: 3,143 (as of February 2002)
- Detained (gripna) for criminal actions: 554
- Detained (omhändertagna) by the police (including following two listings): 575
  - Detained (omhändertagna) by the police in the power of §13 of the police law (aka PL13): 387
  - Detained (omhändertagna) by the police in the power of §11 of the police law (aka PL11): 188
- Arrested (anhållna): 107
- Detained while pending trial (häktade): 59
- Number of verdicts: 38
- Number of "EU-related" (i.e. related to events during the EU-summit) persons injured (treated by hospitals in the region of Västra Götaland): 143
  - Police: 53
  - Demonstrators: 90

The total sum of the sentences following the riots during the EU summit was roughly 50 years in prison, which according to the journalist Erik Wijk is 12 times more than earlier riots. No police were convicted despite a large number of complaints.

One of the most noticed cases is the so-called information central, which was stormed by Nationella insatsstyrkan during the first day of the summit. A total of eight persons (five men, three women) were sentenced to long prison sentences after having sent out text messages urging people to go to Hvitfeldtska gymnasiet in connection with the police shutdown of the school.

The police officer in charge for the EU summit, Håkan Jaldung, was accused in a trial of preventing about 100 people at the Schillerska from leaving the place for several hours, but was found not guilty.

Göteborgsaktionen ("The Gothenburg Action") involved 87 organisations out of whom 33 were Swedish, 22 Danish, 9 Finnish, 5 Norwegian, 4 European and some other mainly from different Eastern European countries. Nätverket Göteborg ("The Gothenburg Network") involved over 20 organisations.

=== Laeken 2001 ===
The Laeken European Council was held at the royal palace at Laeken, Belgium, on 14–15 December 2001.

The Laeken European Council dealt with:

- New measures in the area of Justice and Home Affairs: the European arrest warrant, a common definition of "terrorism", and EUROJUST
- The seats of ten new EU agencies (after hours of disagreement, the European Council failed to reach an agreement and decided to leave the decision until next year)
- Impending introduction of Euro cash (the European Council met with the Finance ministers to consider this)
- Progress of EU enlargement
- The adoption of the Laeken Declaration on the Future of Europe

The Laeken Declaration on the Future of Europe established the European Convention, presided over with former President of France, Valéry Giscard d'Estaing, as President of the convention, and former Italian Prime Minister Giuliano Amato and former Belgian Prime Minister Jean-Luc Dehaene as Vice-Presidents. The convention was tasked with drafting the Treaty establishing a Constitution for Europe, and would have about 60 members, drawn from national governments, national parliamentarians, the European Parliament, and the European Commission, and include representatives from the candidate countries. The declaration reviews the progress of European integration over the last fifty years, tracing it back to its origins in the horrors of World War II, and poses a number of questions to be answered by the convention.

== See also ==
- Euro summit
- European Political Community summits
- List of G7 summits
- List of G20 summits
- List of NATO summits
- President of the European Council
- 1955 Messina Conference
- 1983 Solemn Declaration on European Union
- 1992 Edinburgh Agreement
