= Erik Wijk =

Swedish journalist and leftist writer (born 1963)

- Born: 1963 (age 62–63); Gothenburg
- Writing career
- Genre: journalism
- Subjects: Gothenburg Riots

Erik Wijk (born 1963 in Gothenburg) is a Swedish journalist and leftist writer. He has written books about the 2001 Gothenburg Riots criticizing the Swedish Police. He has also campaigned and written books against NATO's 1999 military actions against the Federal Republic of Yugoslavia.
