= Helmut Scholz =

German politician

Helmut Scholz MEP
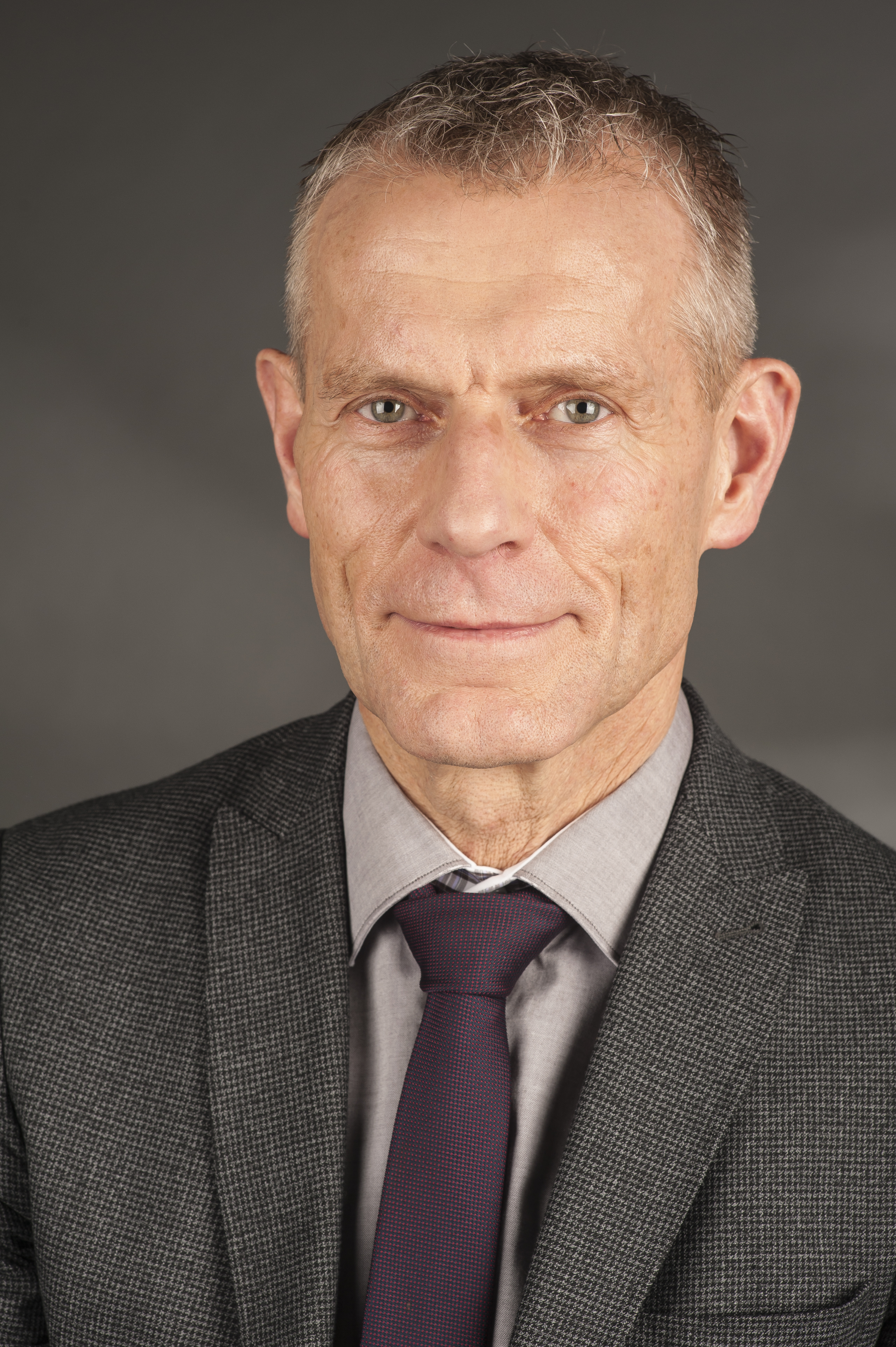

Member of the European Parliament for Germany

Personal details
- Party: The Left (Germany)

Helmut Scholz is a German politician from The Left Party who is serving as a Member of the European Parliament.

He is a member of the Working Group on the Conference on the Future of Europe.

He studied at Moscow State Institute of International Relations.
