= Johnston v Chief Constable of the Royal Ulster Constabulary =

- Court: European Court of Justice
- Decided: 15 May 1986
- Citation: (1986) C-222/84, [1986] 5 ECR 1651

Keywords
- Genuine occupational requirement

Johnston v Chief Constable of the Royal Ulster Constabulary (1986) Case 222/84 is a UK labour law and EU labour law case concerning sex discrimination and genuine occupational requirements.

== Facts ==
Ms Johnston was made redundant when her fixed term contract was not renewed. Women were prohibited from carrying firearms. But many police duties involved carrying firearms. The Royal Ulster Constabulary argued the ban was justified because (1) they may be more frequent assassination targets (2) their guns could end in enemy hands (3) the public would object to it (4) it would hinder their jobs in social, family and children related work.

== Judgment ==
The European Court of Justice held it was up to the Industrial Tribunal to determine whether art 2(2) (now art 14) applied ‘having regard to the specific duties which [Ms Johnston] is required to carry out’ Referring to 'article 2(2) of the Directive, it should be observed that that provision, being a derogation from an individual right laid down in the directive must be interpreted strictly.’ However, looking at the context it cannot be excluded that there would be more risks if policewomen carried firearms. So that may be a determining factor, and if so the member state can place a restriction, which need periodic review under art 9(2). There must also be proportionality so ‘derogations remain within the limits of what is appropriate and necessary for achieving the aim in view and requires the principle of equal treatment’.

== See also ==
- UK labour law
- Unfair dismissal
