= Giorgos Katiforis =

Greek politician (1934/1935 – 2022)

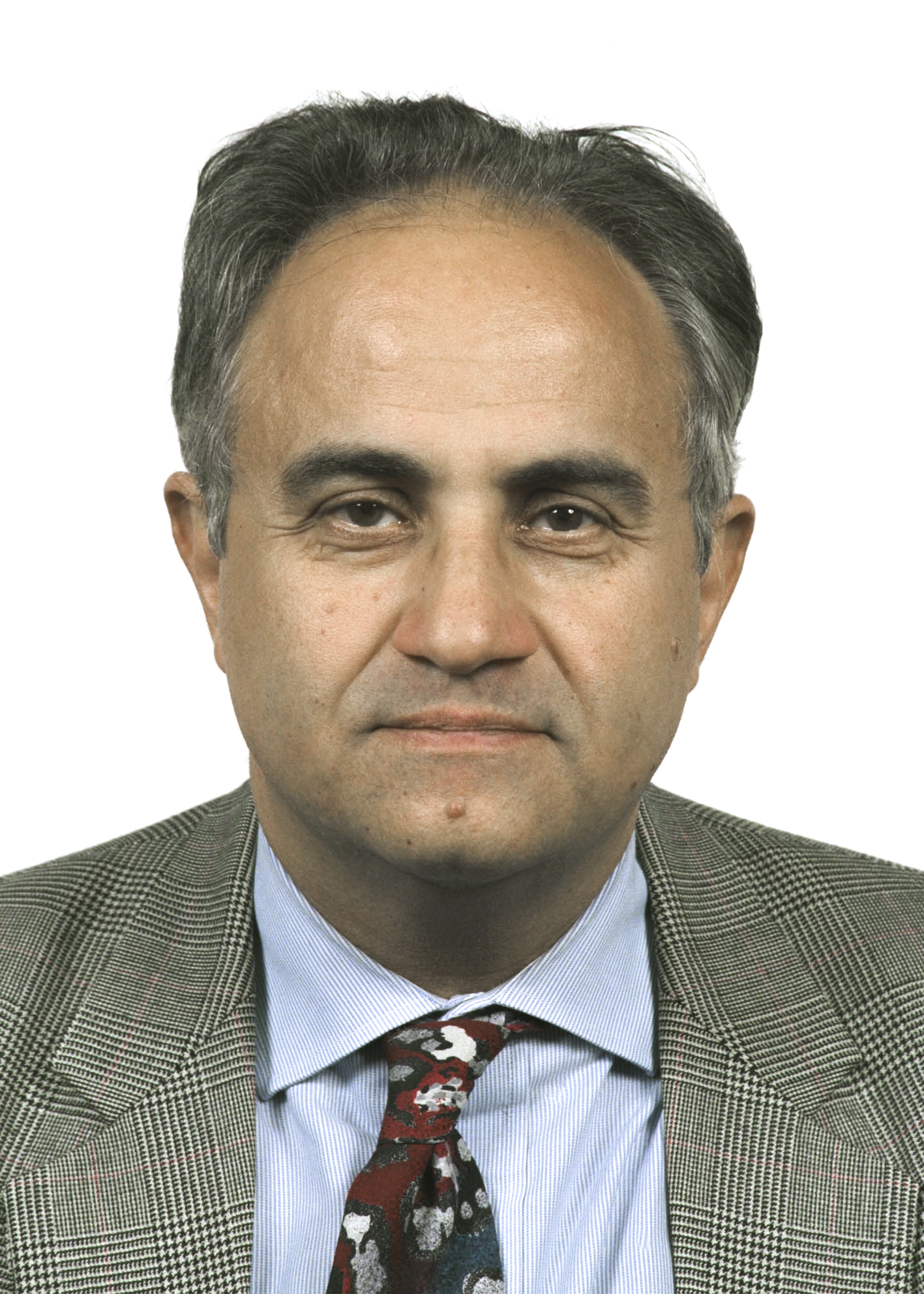
Katiforis in 1994

Giorgos Katiforis (Greek: Γιώργος Κατηφόρης; 24 December 1935 – 12 April 2022) was a Greek politician from the Panhellenic Socialist Movement who served as a Member of the European Parliament.
