= Convergence center =

A convergence center is a central place for information and meeting to serve participants during large and manifold protest or other alternative activities at summits.

They started to be used in the 1990s as a logistic tool to solve communication problems among the large number of people present at varying activities at European Union summits, sometimes also including living quarters.

== See also ==
- Protests during the EU summit in Gothenburg 2001
- 27th G8 summit
