= Charter of Fundamental Rights of the European Union =

Group of rights of the European Union

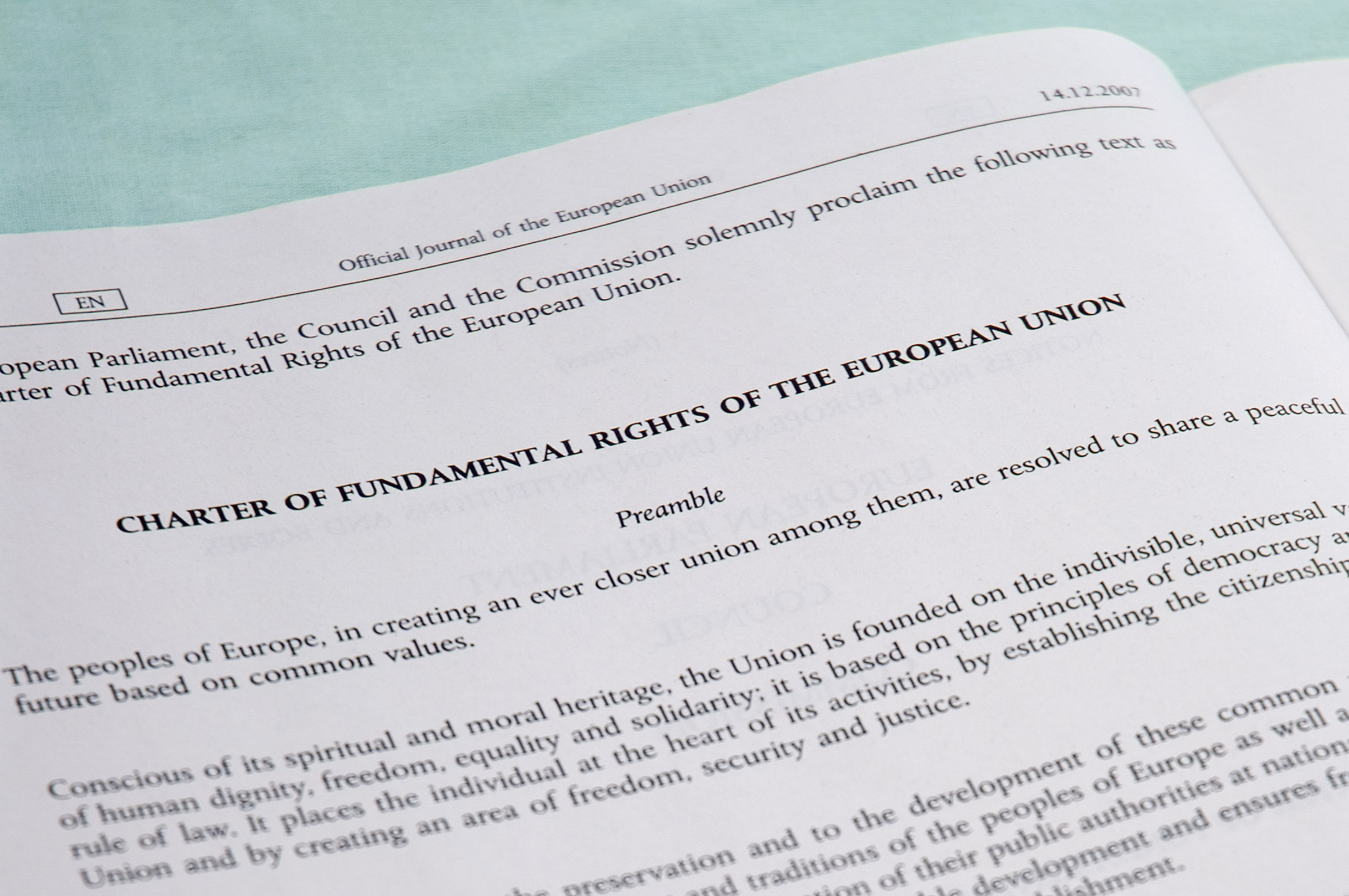
- The preamble of the Charter
- Created: 2 October 2000
- Ratified: 7 December 2000
- Author: European Convention
- Signatories: Institutions and member states of the European Union
- Purpose: Consolidate and enshrine the broad array of rights afforded to citizens of the European Union

Official website
- eur-lex.europa.eu/legal-content/EN/TXT/HTML/?uri=CELEX%3A12012P%2FTXT

Full text
- Charter of Fundamental Rights of the European Union at Wikisource

The Charter of Fundamental Rights of the European Union (CFR) enshrines certain political, social, and economic rights for European Union (EU) citizens and residents into EU law. It was drafted by the European Convention and solemnly proclaimed on 7 December 2000 by the European Parliament, the Council of Ministers and the European Commission. However, its then legal status was uncertain and it did not have full legal effect until the entry into force of the Treaty of Lisbon on 1 December 2009.

The Charter forms part of the area of freedom, security and justice (AFSJ) policy domain of the EU. It applies to all the bodies of the European Union and Euratom which must act and legislate in accordance with its provisions, as the EU's courts will invalidate any EU legislation or ruling assessed as non-compliant with the Charter.

The EU member states are also bound by the Charter when engaged in implementation of the European Union law. However, Poland has been granted a partial opt-out from enforcement of the CFR in spite of participating in the AFSJ; in contrast, Denmark and Ireland have fully adopted the Charter, in spite of having been granted opt-outs from the AFSJ (a general and a partial one, respectively).

== Background ==
The Treaty establishing the European Economic Community (Treaty of Rome) did not include any reference to fundamental or human rights. The EEC Treaty was written a few years after the failure of the European Defence Community Treaty and the European Political Community Treaty. The latter treaty had included rights provisions and Craig and de Búrca argue that, in light of that failure, the drafters of the EEC Treaty wished to eschew any implicitly political elements. However, the idea that the purely economic end of the new EEC Treaty would be unlikely to have any implications for fundamental rights was soon to be tested.

=== Court cases ===
Soon after the entry into force of the EEC Treaty, the Community established itself as a major political entity with policy ramifications beyond its economic aims. In 1964, the European Court of Justice handed down its decision in Costa v ENEL, in which the Court decided that Union law should take precedence over conflicting national law. This meant that national governments could not escape what they had agreed to at a European level by enacting conflicting domestic measures, but it also potentially meant that the EEC legislator could legislate unhindered by the restrictions imposed by fundamental rights provisions enshrined in the constitutions of member states. This issue came to a head in 1970 in the Internationale Handelsgesellschaft case when a German court ruled that a piece of EEC legislation infringed the German Basic Law. On a reference from the German court, the ECJ ruled that whilst the application of Union law could not depend on its consistency with national constitutions, fundamental rights did form an "integral part of the general principles of [European Community] law" and that inconsistency with fundamental rights could form the basis of a successful challenge to a European law.

In ruling as it did in Internationale Handelsgesellschaft the ECJ had in effect created a doctrine of unwritten rights which bound the Community institutions. While the court's fundamental rights jurisprudence was approved by the institutions in 1977 and a statement to that effect was inserted into the Maastricht Treaty. It was only in 1999 that the European Council formally went about the initiating the process of drafting a codified catalogue of fundamental rights for the EU.

=== Proclamation ===
In 1999 the European Council proposed that a "body composed of representatives of the Heads of State and Government and of the president of the Commission as well as of members of the European Parliament and national parliaments" should be formed to draft a fundamental rights charter. On being constituted in December of that year the "body" entitled itself the European Convention.

The Convention adopted the draft on 2 October 2000 and it was solemnly proclaimed by the European Parliament, the Council of Ministers and the European Commission on 7 December 2000. It was at the same time, however, decided to defer making a decision on the Charter's legal status. However, it did come with the political weight of having been approved by three powerful institutions and as such was regularly cited by the ECJ as a source of fundamental rights.

=== Legal force ===
A modified Charter formed part of the defunct European Constitution (2004). After that treaty's failure, its replacement, the Lisbon Treaty (2007), also gave force to the Charter albeit by referencing it as an independent document rather than by incorporating it into the treaty itself. However, both the version included in the Constitution and the one referenced in the Lisbon Treaty were amended versions of the Charter.

On the coming into force of the Lisbon Treaty on 1 December 2009, Justice Commissioner Viviane Reding proposed that Commissioners should swear to uphold all EU treaties and the Charter. On 3 May 2010, the European Commission swore a solemn declaration at the European Court of Justice in Luxembourg, pledging to respect the EU Treaties and to be completely independent in carrying out their duties during their mandate. For the first time, the Commissioners also explicitly pledged to respect the new Charter of Fundamental Rights.

Several states insisted upon an opt-out from national application of the charter (see below for details).

== Legal status ==
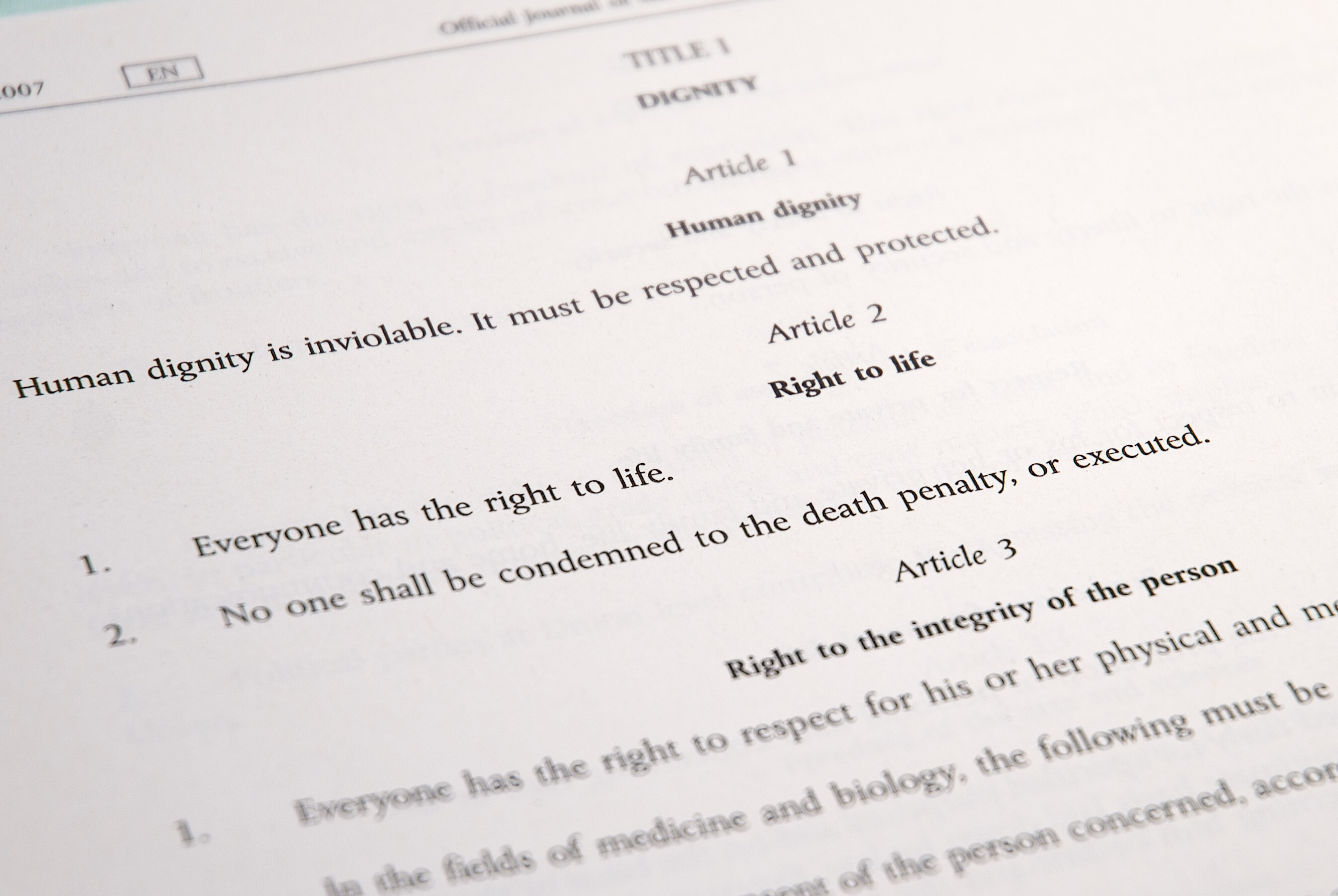
Article 2 of the Charter affirms the prohibition on capital punishment in the EU.

Following the entry into force of the Lisbon Treaty in 2009 the fundamental rights charter has the same legal value as the European Union treaties. The Charter referred to in the Treaty is an amended version of the 2000 document which was solemnly declared by the same three institutions a day before the signing of the Lisbon Treaty itself.

Article 51(1) of the Charter addresses the Charter to the EU's institutions, bodies established under EU law and, when implementing EU laws, the EU's member states. In addition both Article 6 of the amended Treaty of European Union and Article 51(2) of the Charter itself restrict the Charter from extending the competences of the EU. A consequence of this is that the EU will not be able to legislate to vindicate a right set out in the Charter unless the power to do such is set out in the Treaties proper. Furthermore, individuals will not be able to take a member state to court for failing to uphold the rights in the Charter unless the member state in question was implementing EU law. It is this last point that has been subject to the most debate.

The Charter is not the first attempt to place human rights principles at the core of European Union law. All EU member states are, and candidate states are required to be, signatories to the Council of Europe's European Convention on Human Rights, so that many principles from the convention, such as the right to a fair trial, were taken as the baseline for European Court of Justice jurisprudence even before their formal reiteration in Charter. In interpreting the human rights protections provided by the general principles of EU law (described in the Court cases section above), the ECJ had already dealt with the issue of whether the rights protected by those general principles applied to member states. Having ruled in Johnston v Royal Ulster Constabulary that a right to fair procedures was one of the general principles of EU law, in Kremzow v Austria the ECJ had to decide whether or not a member state was obliged to apply that principle in relation to a wrongful conviction for murder. Kremzow's lawyers argued that his case came within the scope of EU law on the grounds that his wrongful conviction and sentence had breached his right to free movement within the EU. The ECJ responded by saying that since the laws under which Kremzow had been convicted were not enacted to secure compliance with EU law, his predicament fell outside the scope of EU law.

The wording in Kremzow v Austria, referring to the "field of application of EU law", differs from the wording in the Charter which refers to the implementation of EU law. However, the amended explanatory memorandum issued alongside the Charter in 2007 describes the wording used in the Charter as reflecting ECJ precedent.

In 2019, the German Federal Constitutional Court established in Recht auf Vergessen II that it applies the Charter as the standard of review for matters regarding EU law and its national implementation, under the premise that the Charter offers sufficiently effective protection of relevant fundamental rights when compared to the Basic Law for the Federal Republic of Germany.

=== The British and Polish protocol ===
States parties States with an opt-out

In the negotiations leading up to the signing to the Lisbon Treaty, Poland and the United Kingdom secured a protocol to the treaty relating to the application of the Charter of the Fundamental Rights in their respective countries.

The protocol, in article 1(1) states that the "Charter does not extend the ability of the Court of Justice of the European Union, or any court or tribunal of Poland or of the United Kingdom, to find that the laws, regulations or administrative provisions, practices or actions of Poland or of the United Kingdom are inconsistent with the fundamental rights, freedoms and principles that it reaffirms." Article 1(2) then says that the Title IV of the Charter, which contains economic and social rights, does not create justiciable rights, unless Poland and the UK have provided for such rights in their national laws.

Poland and the United Kingdom wanted the protocol for different reasons. The United Kingdom originally opposed a legally binding charter over concerns that it would result in a stream of British citizens going to the European Court of Justice in attempts to enforce their Charter rights in the United Kingdom, and in increased costs for business. While the British accepted a legally binding rights charter during the negotiations of the failed European Constitution, they negotiated a protocol during the Lisbon negotiations which, according to the then British Minister for Europe, would ensure that the Charter would not extend the powers of the European Court of Justice over United Kingdom law. Poland, on the other hand, disliked what it perceived as the Charter's liberal stance on social issues, and so in September 2007 the Polish government indicated that they wished to be included in the British protocol.

There is considerable debate concerning the legal effect of the protocol. One view, shared by Jan Jirásek, is that the protocol is an opt-out that excludes the application of the Charter to Poland and the United Kingdom. Another, shared by Ingolf Pernice, is that the protocol is only an interpretive one which will either have limited or no legal consequence. Craig and de Burcá argue that the protocol is merely declaratory. It says that the "Charter does not extend the ability" of the ECJ or other court to overturn British or Polish law, but the ECJ already had the power to do this in any case. Accordingly, the Protocol is "unlikely that it will have any significant effect in practice."

In NS v Home Secretary, the ECJ ruled that Article 1(1) of the protocol "explains Article 51 of the Charter with regard to the scope thereof and does not intend to exempt the Republic of Poland or the United Kingdom from the obligation to comply with the provisions of the Charter or to prevent a court of one of those Member States from ensuring compliance with those provisions."

Under section 5(4) of the European Union (Withdrawal) Act 2018, the Charter of Fundamental Rights was not retained in British law after its exit from the EU.

=== Proposed Czech protocol ===
During the ratification of the Treaty of Lisbon, Czech President Václav Klaus expressed concern that the Charter would allow families of Germans who were expelled from territory in modern-day Czech Republic after the Second World War to challenge the expulsion before the EU's courts, though legal experts have suggested that the laws under which the Germans were expelled, the Beneš decrees, did not fall under the jurisdiction of EU law. After Klaus refused to finalize the Czech Republic's ratification of the Treaty of Lisbon unless the country was excluded from the Charter, as Poland and the United Kingdom had been, EU leaders agreed in October 2009 to amend the protocol to include the Czech Republic at the time of the next accession treaty in a measure designed to persuade Klaus to sign the treaty which he subsequently signed.

In September 2011, the Czech government formally submitted a request to the Council that the promised treaty revisions be made to extend the protocol to the Czech Republic, and a draft amendment to this effect was proposed by the European Council. However, the Czech Senate passed a resolution in October 2011 opposing their accession to the protocol. When Croatia's Treaty of Accession 2011 was signed in late 2011, the Czech protocol amendment was not included. During the Czech Republic's parliamentary ratification of the accession treaty in the spring of 2012, the government attempted to combine the approval of the Charter opt-out with the ratification bill. However, with the Senate controlled by the opposition parties, their objections to the opt-out could have led to the accession treaty being rejected. As a result, the government decided to separate the proposed opt-out from the accession treaty bill.

A vote on a draft report by the European Parliament Constitutional Affairs Committee in January 2012 recommending against granting the Czech Republic's request to be added to Protocol 30 resulted in a tie. The report argued that Protocol 30 was not functioning as a general opt-out from the Charter, but only allowed the countries to limit the application of subsequent EU laws based solely on the charter. Thus, the Czech Republic would still be bound by the Charter even if they were added to the Protocol. In October 2012, the committee approved the report, and a third draft of the report was published on 11 December 2012. The report was tabled in Parliament during its session on 22 May 2013, and the Parliament voted in favour of calling on the European Council "not to examine the proposed amendment of the Treaties". The Parliament did, however, give its consent in advance that a treaty revision to add the Czech Republic to Protocol 30 would not require a new convention.

In January 2014, after presidential and parliamentary elections the previous year had resulted in new leadership in the country, new Czech Human Rights Minister Jiří Dienstbier said that he would attempt to have his country's request for an opt-out withdrawn. This was confirmed on 20 February 2014 by the new Prime Minister Bohuslav Sobotka, who withdrew the request for an opt-out during a meeting with President of the European Commission José Manuel Barroso shortly after his newly elected government won the confidence of Parliament. In May 2014, the Council of the European Union formally withdrew their recommendation to hold an Intergovernmental Conference of member states to consider the proposed amendments to the treaties.

== Content ==
The Charter contains some 54 articles divided into seven titles. The first six titles deal with substantive rights under the headings: dignity, freedoms, equality, solidarity, citizens' rights and justice, while the last title deals with the interpretation and application of the Charter. Much of Charter is based on the European Convention on Human Rights (ECHR), European Social Charter, the case-law of the European Court of Justice and pre-existing provisions of European Union law.

- The first title (Dignity) guarantees the right to life and personal integrity and prohibits torture, slavery, the death penalty, eugenic practices and reproductive human cloning. Its provisions are mostly based on the ECHR, although Article 1 closely reflects Article 1 of the German Basic Law.
- The second title (Freedoms) covers liberty, privacy, protection of personal data, marriage, thought, religion, expression, assembly, education, work, property and asylum.
- The third title (Equality) covers equality before the law, prohibition of all discrimination including on basis of disability, age and sexual orientation, cultural, religious and linguistic diversity, the rights of children and the elderly.
- The fourth title (Solidarity) covers social and workers' rights including the right to fair working conditions, protection against unjustified dismissal, and access to health care, social and housing assistance, environmental protection and consumer protection.
- The fifth title (Citizen's Rights) covers the rights of the EU citizens such as the right to vote and right to candidacy in elections to the European Parliament and municipal elections and the right to move freely within the EU. It also includes several administrative rights such as a right to good administration, to access documents and to petition the European Parliament.
- The sixth title (Justice) covers justice issues such as the right to an effective remedy, a fair trial, to the presumption of innocence, the principle of legality, non-retrospectivity and double jeopardy.
- The seventh title (General Provisions) concerns the interpretation and application of the Charter. These issues are dealt with above.

== Raising the Charter's profile ==
The EU has attempted to raise the profile of the Charter so that citizens are more aware of their rights. For example, the EU Fundamental Rights Agency (FRA) has produced apps for iOS and Android with the text of the Charter in all EU languages and related information. It has also published mini-versions of the Charter in all EU languages.

In 2010, the FRA put out a tender for poets to turn the Charter into an 80-minute-long epic poem, with music, dance and multimedia elements. This was also to raise awareness and to simplify the legal text into more understandable language. However, Viviane Reding, the European Commissioner for Justice, Freedom & Security, wrote to the director of the FRA slamming the idea on cost and dignity grounds and instructing him to cancel the project.

== See also ==
- Capital punishment in Europe
- Citizenship of the European Union
- Fundamental Rights Agency
- European Single Market
- European Social Charter
- Fundamental rights
- Three generations of human rights
- LGBT rights in the European Union
