= Deaths in October 2011 =

The following is a list of notable deaths in October 2011.

Entries for each day are listed alphabetically by surname. A typical entry lists information in the following sequence:

- Name, age, country of citizenship at birth, subsequent country of citizenship (if applicable), reason for notability, cause of death (if known), and reference.

== October 2011 ==
=== 1 ===
- Hans Christian Alsvik, 75, Norwegian television presenter.
- Butch Ballard, 92, American jazz drummer.
- David Bedford, 74, British composer and musician.
- Georgina Cookson, 92, British actress.
- Philo Dibble, 60, American diplomat.
- Robert Finigan, 68, American wine critic.
- Ruby Langford Ginibi, 77, Australian author and Aboriginal historian.
- J. Willis Hurst, 90, American cardiologist.
- José Ángel Ibáñez, 61, Mexican educator and politician, MP (2003–2006).
- Paulos Mantovanis, 65, Cypriot Orthodox hierarch, metropolitan bishop of Kyrenia (since 1994).
- Sholom Rivkin, 85, American rabbi, last chief rabbi of St. Louis.
- Johnny Schmitz, 90, American baseball player (Chicago Cubs, Brooklyn Dodgers).
- George Smith, 84, American baseball and basketball player.
- Sven Tumba, 80, Swedish ice hockey player (world champion 1953, 1957, 1962), footballer and golfer, prostate cancer.

=== 2 ===
- Anna Adams, 85, English poet and artist.
- Vasily Aleksanyan, 39, Russian lawyer and businessman, Executive Vice President of Yukos, complications from AIDS.
- Andrija Fuderer, 80, Croatian-born Belgian chess player.
- Taha Muhammad Ali, 80, Palestinian poet.
- Peter Przygodda, 69, German film editor, cancer.
- Efraín Recinos, 83, Guatemalan architect, muralist and artist, designer of the Centro Cultural Miguel Ángel Asturias.
- John Romonosky, 82, American baseball player (St. Louis Cardinals, Washington Senators).
- Cindy Shatto, 54, Canadian Olympic diver (1976), lung cancer.
- Pavlos Tassios, 69, Greek film director.
- Piero Weiss, 83, Italian pianist and author, pneumonia.
- Moshe Wertman, 87, Israeli politician.

=== 3 ===
- Kay Armen, 95, American Armenian singer.
- Anésio Argenton, 80, Brazilian Olympic cyclist.
- Aryeh Leib Baron, 99, Canadian rabbi.
- Jim Conroy, 73, Canadian football player (Ottawa Rough Riders).
- George Harrison, 72, American Olympic gold medal-winning (1960) swimmer, cancer.
- Ovidio de Jesús, 78, Puerto Rican Olympic sprinter (1956, 1960).
- Héctor Martínez Arteche, 77, Mexican painter.
- Aden Meinel, 88, American astronomer and optical scientist.
- Jim Neal, 81, American basketball player (Syracuse Nationals, Baltimore Bullets).
- Zakaria Zerouali, 33, Moroccan footballer.

=== 4 ===
- Bhagwat Jha Azad, 88, Indian politician.
- Doris Belack, 85, American actress (Law & Order, One Life to Live, Tootsie).
- Yelena Chernykh, 32, Russian actress, traffic collision.
- Ruth Currier, 85, American dancer, choreographer and dance teacher.
- Vittorio Curtoni, 61, Italian science fiction writer and translator.
- Kenneth H. Dahlberg, 94, American businessman and World War II fighter ace, natural causes.
- Di Gribble, 69, Australian publisher, pancreatic cancer.
- Martha Haines, 87, American baseball player (All-American Girls Professional Baseball League).
- Ralph Hodgin, 96, American baseball player (Boston Bees, Chicago White Sox).
- Hanan Porat, 67, Israeli rabbi, educator and politician, cancer.
- Shmuel Shilo, 81, Israeli actor and director, cancer.
- Muzaffer Tema, 92, Turkish actor.
- Géza Tóth, 79, Hungarian Olympic silver medal-winning (1964) weightlifter.

=== 5 ===
- Edward Acquah, 76, Ghanaian Olympic footballer (1964).
- Níver Arboleda, 43, Colombian footballer, heart attack.
- Derrick Bell, 80, American law professor (Harvard University), originated critical race theory, carcinoid cancer.
- Anita Caspary, 95, American Catholic nun, founder of the Immaculate Heart Community.
- Graham Dilley, 52, British cricketer, cancer.
- Enver Faja, 77, Albanian architect and diplomat, Ambassador to Poland (1992–1996), after long illness.
- Richard Holmlund, 47, Swedish football manager, car accident.
- Peter Jaks, 45, Swiss Olympic ice hockey player (1988 Winter Olympics, 1992 Winter Olympics), suicide by train.
- Bert Jansch, 67, Scottish folk guitarist, singer and songwriter (Pentangle), cancer.
- Steve Jobs, 56, American computer entrepreneur and inventor, co-founder of Apple Inc., pancreatic cancer.
- Pietro Lombardi, 89, Italian Olympic gold medal-winning (1948) wrestler.
- Charles Napier, 75, American actor (Philadelphia, The Blues Brothers, Austin Powers).
- Fred Shuttlesworth, 89, American civil rights leader.
- Sarkis Soghanalian, 82, Syrian-born Armenian arms dealer.
- Leon Walter Tillage, 74, American writer.

=== 6 ===
- Luis Proto Barbosa, 84, Indian politician.
- Zdravko Ceraj, 91, Serbian Olympic athlete.
- Diane Cilento, 78, Australian actress (Tom Jones, The Wicker Man, Hombre), cancer.
- William S. Dietrich II, 73, American industrialist and philanthropist.
- Mathur Krishnamurthy, 82, Indian arts patron.
- Daniel Lind Lagerlöf, 42, Swedish director, presumed drowned.
- Marilyn Nash, 84, American actress (Monsieur Verdoux, Unknown World).
- Birgit Rosengren, 98, Swedish actress.
- Igor Shmakov, 26, Russian actor, leukemia.
- Neil Street, 80, Australian speedway rider.
- Alasdair Turner, 41, British scientist, stomach cancer.
- Phil Walker, 67, British newspaper editor.

=== 7 ===
- Zaheer Ahmad, 63, Pakistani-born American doctor, brain hemorrhage.
- John Alderson, 89, British police officer and media commentator, Chief Constable of Devon and Cornwall Constabulary (1973–1982).
- George Alexander, 93, Canadian football player.
- Ramiz Alia, 85, Albanian politician, First Secretary of the Party of Labour (1985–1991), President (1991–1992), lung disease.
- Julien Bailleul, 23, French footballer.
- George Baker, 80, British actor (I, Claudius, The Ruth Rendell Mysteries), pneumonia following a stroke.
- Frederick Cardozo, 94, British soldier and SOE veteran.
- Fernando Charrier, 80, Italian Roman Catholic prelate, Bishop of Alessandria della Paglia (1989–2007).
- Charles Cuprill Oppenheimer, 95, Puerto Rican major general.
- David Hess, 75, American actor (The Last House on the Left), singer and songwriter, heart attack.
- Haji Amir Bux Junejo, 95, Pakistani politician.
- Paul Kent, 80, American actor (Star Trek II: The Wrath of Khan, A Nightmare on Elm Street 3: Dream Warriors, T. J. Hooker), multiple myeloma.
- Fred Kingsbury, 84, American Olympic bronze medal-winning (1948) rower.
- Andrew Laszlo, 85, Hungarian-born American cinematographer (First Blood, The Warriors, Newsies).
- David Macey, 62, British historian, complications of lung cancer.
- Lulama Masikazana, 38, South African cricketer.
- Enrique Monsonís, 80, Spanish politician, President of the Generalitat Valenciana (1979–1982).
- Gianni Musy, 80, Italian actor and voice actor.
- Michel Peissel, 74, French explorer and author, heart attack.
- Milan Puskar, 77, American pharmacist, co-founder of Mylan, cancer.
- Julio Mario Santo Domingo, 88, Colombian businessman (SABMiller).
- Mildred Savage, 92, American author (Parrish).
- Bill Smith, 75, British fell runner and author. (body discovered on this date)
- Avner Treinin, 83, Israeli poet and chemist.

=== 8 ===
- Dragutin Aleksić, 64, Serbian sculptor.
- Terry Cashion, 90, Australian rules football player.
- Al Davis, 82, American football coach and team owner (Oakland Raiders), heart failure.
- José de las Fuentes Rodríguez, 91, Mexican politician and lawyer, Governor of Coahuila (1981–1987).
- Dorothy Heathcote, 85, British drama teacher and academic.
- Arthur F. Holmes, 87, American professor of philosophy.
- Gregory Possehl, 70, American archaeologist.
- Shirley Prestia, 64, American actress (Home Improvement, Dharma & Greg, What Women Want).
- Bharatha Lakshman Premachandra, 55, Sri Lankan politician, Member of Parliament (1994–2000), shot.
- Harold W. Rood, 89, American political scientist and author.
- Nina Sorokina, 69, Russian principal dancer.
- Mikey Welsh, 40, American artist and musician (Weezer).
- Roger Williams, 87, American pianist (Autumn Leaves), pancreatic cancer.
- Ingvar Wixell, 80, Swedish opera singer.

=== 9 ===
- Kei Aoyama, 32, Japanese manga artist, suicide by hanging.
- Ray Aranha, 72, American actor (Dead Man Walking, Die Hard with a Vengeance, Married People).
- Robert Boochever, 94, American federal judge.
- Rob Buckman, 63, British-born Canadian oncologist and comedian.
- Antonis Christeas, 74, Greek basketball player (AEK Athens) and coach.
- Chauncey Hardy, 23, American basketball player, heart attack following beating.
- Pavel Karelin, 21, Russian ski jumper, traffic accident.
- Mark Kingston, 77, British actor.
- Jakkampudi Rammohan Rao, 58, Indian politician, member of the Legislative Assembly of Andhra Pradesh.
- Manuel Prado Perez-Rosas, 88, Peruvian Roman Catholic prelate, Archbishop of Trujillo (1976–1999).
- James Worrall, 97, Canadian Olympic athlete (1936) and administrator.

=== 10 ===
- Ray Aghayan, 83, Iranian-born American costume designer (Funny Lady, Doctor Dolittle).
- Milton Castellanos Everardo, 91, Mexican politician, President of Chamber of Deputies (1951), Governor of Baja California (1971–1977).
- Alan Fudge, 67, American actor (7th Heaven, Matlock, Hawaii Five-O), lung and liver cancer.
- Rod McGaughy, 87, American actor.
- Nakamura Shikan VII, 83, Japanese kabuki performer, Living National Treasure.
- Uno Röndahl, 87, Swedish author.
- Albert Rosellini, 101, American politician, Governor of Washington (1957–1965), complications from pneumonia.
- Jagjit Singh, 70, Indian musician, brain haemorrhage.
- Otto Tausig, 89, Austrian writer, director and actor.

=== 11 ===
- Amin al-Shami, Yemeni air force colonel, car bomb.
- Yerahmiel Assa, 92, Israeli politician.
- Kim Brown, 66, British-born Finnish musician, cancer.
- George "Mojo" Buford, 81, American blues harmonica player.
- Cy Buker, 92, American baseball player (Brooklyn Dodgers).
- Justin Canale, 68, American football player.
- Adrian Cowell, 77, British documentary film maker.
- Ion Diaconescu, 94, Romanian politician, President of Chamber of Deputies (1996–2000), heart failure.
- Doctor X, 43, Mexican professional wrestler, shot.
- Bob Galvin, 89, American businessman, CEO of Motorola (1959–1986).
- Freddie Gruber, 84, American jazz drummer.
- Nauman Habib, 32, Pakistani cricketer, murdered.
- Henk Hofs, 60, Dutch footballer (Vitesse Arnhem).
- Keith Holman, 84, Australian rugby league player and referee.
- Dieudonné Kabongo, 61, Congolese-born Belgian comedian, musician and actor (Lumumba).
- Frank Kameny, 86, American gay rights activist.
- Paul Martin, 79, American baseball player.
- Ewald Osers, 94, Czech translator and poet.
- František Sokol, 72, Czech Olympic bronze medal-winning (1968) volleyball player.
- Derrick Ward, 76, English footballer.
- Dino Zucchi, 83, Italian Olympic basketball player.

=== 12 ===
- Franz Jozef van Beeck, 81, Dutch author and Christian theologian.
- Heinz Bennent, 90, German actor.
- Patricia Breslin, 85, American actress (The People's Choice, Peyton Place, The Twilight Zone), wife of Art Modell, pancreatitis.
- Joel DiGregorio, 67, American keyboardist (The Charlie Daniels Band), car crash.
- Peter Hammond, 87, British actor and television director.
- Lowell H. Harrison, 88, American historian.
- János Herskó, 85, Hungarian film director and actor.
- Vitali Kuznetsov, 70, Russian Olympic silver medal-winning (1972) judoka.
- Paul Leka, 68, American pianist, arranger and songwriter ("Na Na Hey Hey Kiss Him Goodbye", "Green Tambourine").
- Lewis Mills, 74, American college basketball coach (University of Richmond) and athletic director.
- Dennis Ritchie, 70, American computer scientist, developer of the C programming language and the Unix operating system. (body discovered on this date)
- Dick Thornett, 71, Australian triple international sportsman (water polo, rugby union and rugby league), heart disease.
- Martin White, 102, Irish hurler.
- Winstone Zulu, 47, Zambian AIDS and tuberculosis activist.

=== 13 ===
- Sheila Allen, 78, British actress (Bouquet of Barbed Wire, Love Actually, Harry Potter and the Goblet of Fire).
- Irén Daruházi-Karcsics, 84, Hungarian Olympic silver (1948, 1952) and bronze (1952) medal-winning gymnast.
- Chris Doig, 63, New Zealand opera singer and sports administrator, bowel cancer.
- Hasan Güngör, 77, Turkish Olympic gold (1960) and silver (1964) medal-winning weightlifter.
- Barbara Kent, 103, Canadian-born American silent film actress.
- Tufele Liamatua, 71, American Samoan politician and paramount chief, first elected Lieutenant Governor of American Samoa (1978–1985).
- Abdoulaye Seye, 77, Senegalese Olympic bronze medal-winning (1960) athlete.

=== 14 ===
- Reg Alcock, 63, Canadian politician, MP for Winnipeg South (1993–2006); President of the Treasury Board (2003–2006), heart attack.
- Abdulrahman al-Awlaki, 16, American-Yemeni teenager, drone airstrike.
- Margaret Draper, 94, American radio actress and disc jockey, natural causes.
- Michael Fitzpatrick, 69, Irish politician, TD for Kildare North (2007–2011), motor neurone disease.
- Pierangelo Garegnani, 81, Italian economist and professor.
- Ashawna Hailey, 62, American computer scientist.
- Adam Hunter, 48, Scottish golfer, leukemia.
- Arnaud Jacomet, 64, French historian, Secretary-General of the Western European Union (2009–2011), cancer.
- Laura Pollán, 63, Cuban opposition leader, founder of the Ladies in White, cardiorespiratory arrest.
- Gunilla von Post, 79, Swedish socialite.
- Jaladi Raja Rao, 79, Indian film lyricist and playwright.
- Chuck Ruff, 60, American drummer (Edgar Winter, Sammy Hagar), after long illness.

=== 15 ===
- Mario Agliati, 89, Swiss-Italian journalist, writer and historian.
- Martha Aliaga, 73, Argentine statistics educator.
- Ted Bastin, 85, English physicist and mathematician.
- David P. Demarest, 79, American academic and writer.
- Betty Driver, 91, British singer and actress (Coronation Street), pneumonia.
- Sir Donald Dunstan, 88, Australian military officer, Governor of South Australia (1982–1991).
- Joan Jaykoski, 78, American AAGPBL baseball player, cancer.
- Pierre Mamboundou, 65, Gabonese politician, leader of the Union of the Gabonese People (since 1989), heart attack.
- Matthew G. Martínez, 82, American politician, U.S. Representative from California (1982–2001).
- Earl McRae, 69, Canadian journalist (Ottawa Sun), apparent heart attack.
- Sue Mengers, 79, American talent agent, pneumonia.
- Tongai Moyo, 43, Zimbabwean musician, non Hodgkin's lymphoma.
- Gerald Shapiro, 61, American fiction writer and academic.
- Titus Thotawatte, 82, Sri Lankan director.

=== 16 ===
- Hiroshi Arikawa, 70, Japanese voice actor.
- Henry Bathurst, 8th Earl Bathurst, 84, British aristocrat and politician.
- Eusebio Bertrand, 81, Spanish Olympic sailor.
- Ursula Cain, 84, German dancer and dance teacher.
- Elouise P. Cobell, 65, American Native rights activist.
- Donald Davies, 91, American Episcopal bishop of Dallas and Fort Worth.
- Antony Gardner, 84, British politician, MP for Rushcliffe (1966–1970).
- Miguel Ángel Granados Chapa, 70, Mexican journalist.
- Charles Hamm, 86, American musicologist.
- Rick Huseman, 38, American off-road race truck driver, airplane crash.
- Virginia Knauer, 96, American consumer advocate and government official.
- Tony Marchington, 55, English biotechnology entrepreneur and preservationist (Flying Scotsman).
- Stanley Mitchell, 79, British translator, academic and author.
- Caerwyn Roderick, 84, British politician, MP for Brecon & Radnor (1970–1979).
- Pete Rugolo, 95, Italian-born American film and television composer (Kiss Me Kate, The Fugitive).
- Henning Sjöström, 89, Swedish defense attorney, long illness.
- Elisabeth Tankeu, 67, Cameroonian politician, Minister for Planning and Regional Development (1988–1992).
- Dan Wheldon, 33, British IndyCar driver, racing accident.
- Don Williams, 80, American baseball player (Pittsburgh Pirates, Kansas City Athletics).

=== 17 ===
- Hameed Akhtar, 87, Pakistani journalist and writer.
- John Morton Blum, 90, American political historian.
- Ramaz Chkhikvadze, 83, Georgian-born English stage actor.
- Barney Danson, 90, Canadian politician, MP for York North (1968–1979), Minister of National Defence (1976–1979).
- Manfred Gerlach, 83, German politician, last Chairman of the State Council of East Germany (1989–1990).
- Poul Glargaard, 69, Danish actor.
- Osvaldo Guidi, 47, Argentine actor, suicide by hanging.
- Carl Lindner Jr., 92, American businessman (United Dairy Farmers, Cincinnati Reds), cardiac arrest.
- Elaine Nile, 75, Australian politician, member of the New South Wales Legislative Council (1988–2002), cancer.
- Muiris Ó Rócháin, 67, Irish teacher and director of the Willie Clancy Summer School.
- Ken Rush, 80, American NASCAR driver.
- Piri Thomas, 83, American writer (Down These Mean Streets) and poet, pneumonia.
- Edgar Villchur, 94, American inventor of the acoustic suspension loudspeaker.
- Xin Huguang, 78, Chinese composer.

=== 18 ===
- Uri Amit, 77, Israeli politician.
- Bob Brunning, 68, British blues musician (Fleetwood Mac), heart attack.
- George Chaloupka, 79, Czech-born Australian historian of indigenous art.
- Ruby Cohn, 89, American theater scholar, Parkinson's disease.
- Norman Corwin, 101, American radio writer, director and producer.
- Paul Everac, 87, Romanian writer, cancer.
- Tommy Grant, 76, Canadian football player (Hamilton Tiger-Cats).
- Kent Hull, 50, American football player (Buffalo Bills), liver disease.
- Jan Marian Kaczmarek, 90, Polish engineer and academic.
- Friedrich Kittler, 68, German literary scholar and media theorist.
- Lee Soo-chul, 45, South Korean football manager, suicide.
- Sir Donald McCallum, 89, British engineer and industrialist.
- Merritt Ranew, 73, American baseball player (Chicago Cubs)
- Anita Sleeman, 80, Canadian composer.
- Michael Staikos, 65, Greek-born Austrian Orthodox hierarch, metropolitan bishop of Austria (since 1991).
- Jacques Thuillier, 83, French art historian.
- Andrea Zanzotto, 90, Italian poet.

=== 19 ===
- Munshi Siddique Ahmad, 87, Bangladeshi rice scientist.
- Édison Chará, 31, Colombian footballer, shot.
- Kakkanadan, 76, Indian Malayalam writer.
- Ken Meyerson, 47, American tennis agent.
- Bohdan Osadchuk, 91, Ukrainian historian and journalist.
- Hollis E. Roberts, 68, American politician, Chief of the Choctaw Nation of Oklahoma (1978–1997), convicted sex offender.
- Jeff Rudom, 51, American basketball player and actor.
- Tadeusz Sawicz, 97, Polish World War II fighter pilot.
- Lars Sjösten, 70, Swedish jazz pianist and composer.
- Ronald Smith, 67, British Olympic boxer (1964).
- Jon Weaving, 80, Australian operatic tenor, pancreatic cancer.
- Keith Williams, 82, Australian tourism entrepreneur (Sea World), stroke.
- James Yannatos, 82, American composer and conductor.

=== 20 ===
- Ronald Amess, 84, Australian Olympic ice hockey player.
- Jerzy Bielecki, 90, Polish social worker, survivor of Auschwitz concentration camp, Polish Righteous among the Nations recipient.
- John Bosco Manat Chuabsamai, 75, Thai Roman Catholic prelate, Bishop of Ratchaburi (1985–2003).
- Barry Feinstein, 80, American photographer and photojournalist.
- Yann Fouéré, 101, French Breton nationalist.
- Mutassim Gaddafi, 36, Libyan Army officer, fifth son of Muammar Gaddafi, shooting.
- Muammar Gaddafi, 69, Libyan leader (1969–2011), shooting.
- Gale Gillingham, 67, American football player (Green Bay Packers).
- Abu-Bakr Yunis Jabr, 59, Libyan military officer and politician, Minister of Defence (1970–2011), shooting.
- Hunter, 36, Australian rapper, cancer.
- Sue Lloyd, 72, British actress (The Ipcress File, Crossroads).
- Antoine Pazur, 80, French footballer.
- Iztok Puc, 45, Slovenian handball player, only Olympian handball player to represent three countries, lung cancer.
- Morris Tabaksblat, 74, Dutch industrialist.
- Roger Tallon, 82, French industrial designer.
- Peter Taylor, 84-85, British botanist.

=== 21 ===
- Maikano Abdoulaye, 79, Cameroonian politician.
- Hikmet Bilâ, 57, Turkish journalist and author, lung cancer.
- Antonio Cassese, 74, Italian international law expert, Yugoslavian war crimes judge, cancer.
- George Daniels, 85, British horologist.
- Thomas Dillon, 61, American serial killer.
- Chris Dixon, 67–68, Rhodesian Air Force pilot known as "Green Leader".
- Bertram Herlong, 77, American bishop of the Episcopal Diocese of Tennessee.
- Digby Jacks, 66, British president of the National Union of Students (1971–1973).
- Anis Mansour, 86, Egyptian writer and columnist, pneumonia.
- Ettore Milano, 86, Italian cyclist.
- Tone Pavček, 83, Slovenian author and translator.
- Edmundo Ros, 100, Trinidadian-born British bandleader.
- Scott White, 41, American politician, member of the Washington House of Representatives (2009–2011) and State Senator (2011), cardiomegaly complications.

=== 22 ===
- Jan Boye, 49, Danish politician, complications from brain hemorrhage.
- Kristoffer Domeij, 29, United States Army soldier, killed in action.
- Jean Dubuisson, 97, French architect.
- Peter Goldie, 64, British philosopher.
- Trevor Gordon, 96, Australian cricketer.
- Kutty, 90, Indian political cartoonist.
- Roger Moore, 73, American professional poker player.
- Mullanezhi, 63, Indian poet and actor, heart attack.
- Cathal O'Shannon, 83, Irish journalist and television presenter.
- Robert Pierpoint, 86, American broadcast journalist, complications from surgery.
- Roy Smalley Jr., 85, American baseball player (Chicago Cubs, Milwaukee Braves, Philadelphia Phillies).
- Sultan bin Abdulaziz, 83, Saudi royal, Minister of Defense and Aviation (since 1962) and Crown Prince (since 2005), colorectal cancer.
- Ed Thompson, 66, American politician, Mayor of Tomah, Wisconsin (2008–2010), and gubernatorial candidate, pancreatic cancer.

=== 23 ===
- Nusrat Bhutto, 82, Iranian-born Pakistani First Lady, widow of Zulfikar Ali Bhutto and mother of Benazir Bhutto.
- John Brown, 81, British Anglican bishop, Bishop in Cyprus and the Gulf (1987–1996)
- Joseph Dao, 75, Burkinabé-born Malian Roman Catholic prelate, Bishop of Kayes (1978–2011).
- Oscar Stanley Dawson, 87, Indian admiral, Chief of the Naval Staff (1982–1984), brain haemorrhage.
- Winston Griffiths, 33, Jamaican footballer.
- Herbert A. Hauptman, 94, American Nobel Prize-winning chemist (1985).
- Florence Parry Heide, 92, American children's author.
- Sir Frank Holmes, 87, New Zealand economist and government advisor.
- William Franklin Lee III, 82, American music educator, dean of University of Miami School of Music (1964–1982).
- Bronislovas Lubys, 73, Lithuanian entrepreneur and politician, Prime Minister of Lithuania (1992–1993), heart attack.
- John Makin, 61, British folk and blues singer (Potverdekke! (It's great to be a Belgian)).
- Miroslav Proft, 87, Czech Olympic shooter.
- Amnon Salomon, 71, Israeli cinematographer, cancer.
- Marco Simoncelli, 24, Italian motorcycle racer, race crash.
- Tillie Taylor, 88, Canadian judge.
- Bogdan Zakrzewski, 95, Polish historian and researcher of Polish literature.

=== 24 ===
- Bob Beaumont, 79, American electric automobile manufacturer (Citicar), emphysema.
- Margit Brandt, 66, Danish fashion designer, chronic obstructive pulmonary disease.
- Robert Bropho, 81, Australian indigenous rights activist and convicted criminal, natural causes.
- Liviu Ciulei, 88, Romanian actor, writer and director, after long illness.
- Max Gillett, 84, Australian politician, member of the Victorian Legislative Assembly for Geelong West (1958–1964).
- Harold Huskilson, 91, Canadian politician, member of the Nova Scotia House of Assembly (1970–1993).
- Kjell Johansson, 65, Swedish table tennis player.
- Morio Kita, 84, Japanese novelist, essayist and psychiatrist.
- Héctor López, 44, Mexican boxer, Olympic silver medal-winner (1984), drug overdose.
- John McCarthy, 84, American computer scientist, creator of LISP and the term AI, heart disease.
- Pat McNamara, 85, American Olympic speed skater.
- Alan Morgan, 71, British Anglican prelate, Bishop of Sherwood (1989–2004).
- Crescênzio Rinaldini, 85, Italian-born Brazilian Roman Catholic prelate, Bishop of Araçuaí (1982–2001).
- Sir Peter Siddell, 76, New Zealand artist, brain tumour.
- Kirtanananda Swami, 74, American excommunicated Hare Krishna leader and convicted felon, kidney failure.
- Bruno Weber, 80, Swiss artist and architect.
- Ken Yamaguchi, 55, Japanese voice actor, illness.

=== 25 ===
- Leonidas Andrianopoulos, 100, Greek footballer (Olympiacos).
- Perkins Bass, 99, American politician, U.S. Representative from New Hampshire (1955–1963).
- Shirley Becke, 94, British police officer, first female to reach chief officer rank.
- Bert Cueto, 74, Cuban baseball player (Minnesota Twins).
- Arved Deringer, 98, German lawyer (Freshfields Bruckhaus Deringer) and politician.
- Donald Foley, 47-48, American actor.
- Sinikka Keskitalo, 60, Finnish Olympic long-distance runner.
- Wyatt Knight, 56, American actor (Porky's), suicide by gunshot.
- Manuel López Ochoa, 77, Mexican actor (Chucho el roto).
- Tom McNeeley, 74, American boxer, complications from a seizure.
- Mohan Raghavan, 47, Indian Malayalam film director.
- Fyodor Reut, 64, Soviet and later Russian military officer.
- Bernard Verdcourt, 86, British botanist.
- Howard Wolpe, 71, American politician, U.S. Representative from Michigan (1979–1993).
- Norrie Woodhall, 105, British stage actress.

=== 26 ===
- Salvador Bernal, 66, Filipino designer, National Artist of the Philippines.
- Daniel Burke, 82, American television executive, President of ABC (1986–1994), complications of diabetes.
- Dave Cole, 81, American baseball player (Boston Braves, Milwaukee Braves, Chicago Cubs).
- Mickey Kelly, 82, Irish hurler (Kilkenny GAA).
- Aristide Laurent, 70, American publisher and LGBT civil rights advocate.
- John Morris, 71, South African cricketer.
- William A. Niskanen, 78, American economist, member of the Council of Economic Advisors (1981–1985), chairman of the Cato Institute (1985–2008), stroke.
- Jona Senilagakali, 81, Fijian physician and diplomat, Prime Minister (2006–2007).
- Jorge Soto, 66, Argentine golfer.
- Francisco Villar García-Moreno, 63, Spanish politician, President of National Sports Council (1999-2000).

=== 27 ===
- Tom Brown, 89, American tennis player.
- T. Max Graham, 70, American actor (Article 99, Eraserhead), cancer.
- Ronald Greeley, 72, American planetary scientist.
- James Hillman, 85, American psychologist, proponent of archetypal psychology.
- Ron Holmes, 48, American football player (Tampa Bay Buccaneers, Denver Broncos).
- Eduard Kojnok, 78, Slovak Roman Catholic prelate, Bishop of Rožňava (1990–2008).
- Allen Mandelbaum, 85, American professor of Italian literature, poet and translator.
- Robert Pritzker, 85, American billionaire industrialist, Parkinson's disease and member of the Pritzker family.

=== 28 ===
- Ricky Adams, 52, American baseball player (California Angels), cancer.
- Tom Addington, 92, British soldier.
- Campbell Christie, 74, Scottish trade unionist.
- Willy De Clercq, 84, Belgian politician.
- Beryl Davis, 87, British big band singer and actress.
- R. Sheldon Duecker, 85, American prelate, bishop of the United Methodist Church.
- Jiří Gruša, 72, Czech dissident, diplomat and writer.
- Roger Kerr, 66, New Zealand public policy and business leader, executive director of the New Zealand Business Roundtable, metastatic melanoma.
- Alvin Schwartz, 94, American comic book writer (Batman, Green Lantern, Superman), heart-related complications.
- Kan Singh Parihar, 98, Indian jurist.
- Arnold Ruiner, 74, Austrian Olympic cyclist.
- Sri Lal Sukla, 85, Indian writer, long illness.
- Wilmer W. Tanner, 101, American zoologist.
- Ed Walker, 94, American World War II veteran and writer, last surviving member of Castner's Cutthroats.

=== 29 ===
- Christine Atallah, 45, Canadian singer-songwriter and writer, complications from a fall.
- Axel Axgil, 96, Danish gay rights activist.
- Dolores Dwyer, 76, American Olympic athlete and actress.
- Lloyd G. Jackson, 93, American politician, President of West Virginia Senate (1969–1971).
- Robert Lamoureux, 91, French comedian and film director.
- Yoland Levèque, 74, French Olympic boxer.
- Elfriede von Nitzsch, 91, German Olympic athlete.
- Walter Norris, 79, American jazz pianist.
- R. C. Pitts, 92, American Olympic gold medal-winning (1948) basketball player.
- Ram Revilla, 22, Filipino actor, shot and stabbed.
- Jimmy Savile, 84, British disc jockey, television presenter (Top of the Pops, Jim'll Fix It) and sex offender.
- K. Suppu, 70, Indian politician.
- Samdup Taso, 83, Indian hereditary priest.
- Walter Vidarte, 80, Uruguayan actor.
- Tom Watkins, 74, American football player (Cleveland Browns, Detroit Lions), after long illness.
- Mano Wijeyeratne, 54, Sri Lankan politician.

=== 30 ===
- John Anderson, 93, British pathologist.
- Serge Aubry, 69, Canadian ice hockey player (Quebec Nordiques), diabetes.
- Bob Barry Sr., 80, American sports commentator.
- Basile Decortès, 89, French cyclist.
- T. M. Jacob, 61, Indian politician, member of the Kerala Legislative Assembly.
- Tom Keith, 64, American radio personality (A Prairie Home Companion).
- Jonas Kubilius, 90, Lithuanian mathematician.
- Phyllis Love, 85, American actress (Friendly Persuasion, The Young Doctors), Alzheimer's disease.
- Christopher J. Mega, 80, American politician and judge.
- Cyril Parfitt, 97, British artist.
- Virgilio Salimbeni, 91, Italian cyclist.
- Mickey Scott, 64, German-born American baseball player (Baltimore Orioles, Montreal Expos).
- David Utz, 87, American surgeon, removed Ronald Reagan's prostate, heart failure.
- Richard Walls, 74, New Zealand politician and businessman, MP for Dunedin North (1975–1978) and Mayor of Dunedin (1989–1995).
- Abbas-Ali Amid Zanjani, 74, Iranian cleric and politician, President of Tehran University (2005–2008), heart failure.

=== 31 ===
- Flórián Albert, 70, Hungarian footballer, European Footballer of the Year (1967).
- Alberto Anchart, 80, Argentine actor (Venga a bailar el rock), cancer.
- Liz Anderson, 84, American country music singer-songwriter, complications from heart and lung disease.
- Mick Anglo, 95, British comic book writer and artist, creator of Marvelman.
- Caridad Asensio, 80, Cuban-American migrant worker advocate, seizure.
- Gilbert Cates, 77, American film director and producer (Telecast of the Academy Awards, Oh, God! Book II), founder of Geffen Playhouse.
- James Forrester, 74, American physician and politician, North Carolina State Senator (since 1990).
- Boris de Greiff, 81, Colombian chess master.
- Alfred Hilbe, 83, Liechtensteiner politician, Prime Minister (1970–1974).
- Len Killeen, 72, South African rugby league player.
- Marios Leousis, 75, Greek magician.
- Ali Saibou, 71, Nigerien politician, President (1987–1993).
