= George Alexander =

George Alexander may refer to:

== In arts and entertainment ==
- George Alexander (actor) (1858–1918), British actor
- George Alexander (American musician) (1867–1913), American recording pioneer
- George Alexander (Scottish musician), stage name of Alexander Young (1938–1997), singer and guitarist of the band Grapefruit

== In government, military, and politics ==
- George Alexander (American politician) (1839–1923), mayor of Los Angeles
- George Alexander (Canadian politician) (1814–1903), former member of the Canadian Senate
- George A. Alexander (1884–1969), 35th Naval Governor of Guam
- George F. Alexander (1882–1948), US District Court judge in Alaska
- George T. Alexander (1971–2005), US Army soldier
- George W. Alexander (1904–1992), Pennsylvania politician
- George Warren Alexander (1829–1903), military officer in Pennsylvania

== In sports ==
- George Alexander (Australian cricketer) (1851–1930), Australian Test cricketer
- George Alexander (English cricketer) (1842–1913), English cricketer
- George Alexander (Canadian football) (1918–2011), Canadian football running back
- George Alexander (footballer) (born 2001), English footballer
- George Alexander (lacrosse) (1886–1929), British lacrosse player

== In other fields ==
- George Moyer Alexander (1914–1983), bishop of the Episcopal Diocese of Upper South Carolina
- George William Alexander (1802–1890), English banker, abolitionist and philanthropist

== See also ==
- Georg Alexander, Duke of Mecklenburg (1921–1996), head of the House of Mecklenburg-Strelitz
- Georg Alexander (1888–1945), German actor
- George Alexander Trebek (1940–2020), host of longtime television game show Jeopardy!
- Alexander George (disambiguation)
