= Jan Kaczmarek =

Jan Kaczmarek may refer to the following:

- Jan A. P. Kaczmarek (1953–2024), Polish composer
- Jan Marian Kaczmarek (1920–2011), Polish politician
- Jane Kaczmarek (born 1955), American actress
