= José Ibáñez =

José Ibáñez may refer to:

== Sports ==
- José María Ibáñez, Argentinian racing driver in 1955 World Sportscar Championship season#Race results
- José Ibáñez Gómez (1951–2024), Cuban Olympic medalist in judo
- José Ibáñez (cyclist) (born 1968), Colombian racing cyclist
- José Ibañez, French racing driver in 2009 Formula Le Mans Cup season#Drivers' standings position 36
- Jose Ibañez, Chilean Equestrian at the 2011 Pan American Games – Team eventing#Dressage

== Others ==
- José Ibáñez Noriega, 1875–1981), Cuban musician known as Chicho Ibáñez
- José Ibáñez Martín (1896–1969), Spanish government official
- José Ángel Ibáñez (1950–2011), Mexican educator and politician
- José Ibáñez, Argentinian film producer of 2008 documentary Maradona by Kusturica
- José María Ibáñez Zafón, Spanish local official, alcalde of Zucaina since 2011

== See also ==
- Joseph Ibáñez (1927–2009), French footballer and coach (2009 in association football#Deaths on 20 June)
- San José, Andrés Ibáñez, town in Bolivia
