= Von Post =

von Post is a surname of Swedish origin. It may refer to:

- Lennart von Post (1884–1951), Swedish naturalist and geologist
- Gunilla von Post (1932–2011), Swedish aristocrat who allegedly had an intimate relationship with John F. Kennedy
