= Taso =

Taso is both a masculine given name and a surname. Notable people with the name include:

== Given name ==
- Taso Mathieson (1908–1991), British racing driver
- Taso N. Stavrakis (born 1957), American actor
- Taso Vasiliadis (born 1974), Greek tennis player

== Surname ==
- László Tasó (born 1963), Hungarian politician
- Samdup Taso (1928–2011), Sikkimese shaman
