= Alexander George =

Alexander or Alex George may refer to:

- Alex George (botanist) (born 1939), Australian botanist
- Alexander L. George (1920–2006), American political scientist
- Alexander George (philosopher), American philosopher
- Alex George (motorcyclist), Scottish Grand Prix motorcycle racer
- Alex George (baseball) (born 1938), Major League Baseball player
- Alex George (television personality) (born 1991), British doctor and reality television contestant

== See also ==
- George Alexander (disambiguation)
