= Mighty Lak' a Rose =

1901 American "dialect song"

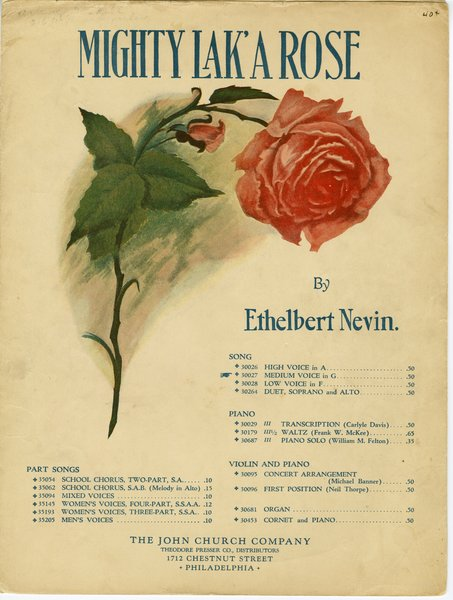
Sheet music cover

"Mighty Lak' a Rose" is a 1901 song with lyrics by Frank Lebby Stanton and music by Ethelbert Nevin. The lyrics are written in an approximation of an African American accent as a "dialect song", and the title thus means "mighty like a rose". It is sung by a black woman called "Mammy" to a newborn blue-eyed white boy in her care. It was common at the time for white families to hire trusted black women to care for their children.

The dialect has been modified by some singers, such as Frank Sinatra. The tune became a Tin Pan Alley hit, with versions by George Alexander (1903), Marguerite Dunlap (1911), and Geraldine Farrar (1916), and it was a perennial of pop music for generations. Deanna Durbin sang it as a lullaby in the 1943 film The Amazing Mrs. Holliday. The tune is whistled by the killer in the film 'Night Must Fall' (1937). Other notable recordings include those by Bing Crosby (recorded December 4, 1945), Jane Powell, Lillian Nordica, Geraldine Farrar, Vincent Lopez, Paul Robeson, Art Tatum, Wilbur DeParis, Nina Simone, Petula Clark, John McCormack, Henry Burr, and Roger Whittaker. More recently, it was recorded by American tenor Casey Jones Costello for his 2019 album Trees and Other Sentimental Songs of Bygone Days. An orchestra arrangement was recorded by Frank Chacksfield.

The song was Nevin's final composition, as he died on 17 February 1901 shortly after composing it. Stanton died in 1927.

Mighty Lak' a Rose
1908 recording of Lillian Nordica singing Mighty Lak' a Rose 2575 KB
