= List of secretaries general of the Western European Union =

The secretary-general of the Western European Union was the head of the Western European Union (WEU), a Cold War era European defence and collective security organisation, which was dissolved in 2011.

In 1999, it was agreed that the holder of the newly created post of High Representative for the Common Foreign and Security Policy of the European Union should also be the secretary-general of the WEU. This was then Javier Solana; however, following a reconfiguration of the high representative post, Solana's successor Catherine Ashton was never appointed Secretary-General, and an acting secretary-general fulfilled the role until the WEU's dissolution in 2011.

== List of secretaries general ==
Name	Country	Years
Louis Goffin	Belgium	1955–1962
Maurice Iweins d'Eeckhoutte	Belgium	1962–1970
Georges Heisbourg	Luxembourg	1971–1974
Friedrich-Karl von Plehwe	West Germany	1974–1977
Edouard Longerstaey	Belgium	1977–1985
Alfred Cahen	Belgium	1985–1989
Wim van Eekelen	Netherlands	1989–1994
José Cutileiro	Portugal	1994–1999
Javier Solana	Spain	1999–2009
Arnaud Jacomet	France	2009–2011
