= Timeline of the Orange Revolution =

Below is the timeline of events that followed the runoff presidential election held in Ukraine on 21 November 2004 that sparked off the "Orange Revolution".

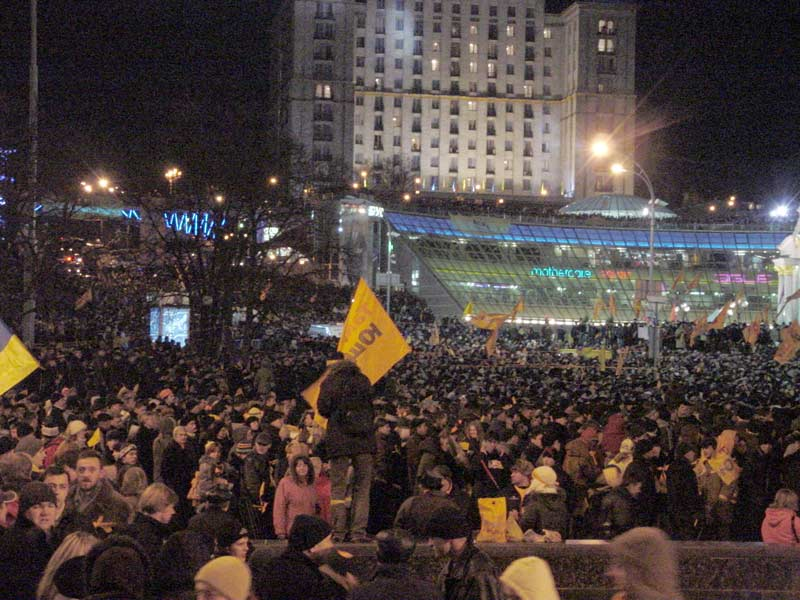
Orange-clad supporters of Viktor Yushchenko gather in Independence Square in Kyiv.

== 21 November ==
Shortly after the polling stations closed in the evening, several exit polls were released showing a substantial lead for Viktor Yushchenko. The first poll, conducted by several Ukrainian research organisations, gave Yuchshenko 54% of the vote, against Viktor Yanukovych's 43%. The results were based on the answers of 77% of 30,000 voters questioned at nearly 500 polling stations around the country. The second poll, conducted by Ukraine's Social Monitoring Centre, put Yushchenko ahead by 49.5% to 45.9%. These results were disputed by the Yanukovych campaign team, who quoted their own exit polls giving their candidate a 3% to 5% lead.

Tens of thousands of opposition supporters, including members of the PORA student movement, gathered in Independence Square in Kyiv to see the results broadcast live on television.

== 22 November ==
At 02:00 the Central Election Commission (CEC) of Ukraine announced that after 33% of accounted votes Viktor Yanukovich was ahead with 50% to the 46% for Viktor Yushchenko. That data sharply deviated from the results of several groups of sociologists who in the instant after the end of the voting declared Yushchenko's victory. Yushchenko travelled to CEC to meet with Serhiy Kivalov. After a meeting behind closed doors Yushchenko announced: "We do not trust the accountability of the Central Election Commission. We call on our supporters to come on to Maidan of Independence and protect their freedom."

The same night in Kyiv armoured vehicles arrived. BTRs appeared next to the building of CEC. Under the reinforced security was taken the building complex of the presidential administration. The order in the capital was carried out by several ten thousands of military personnel of the Internal Affairs and spetsnaz.

Ukraine's CEC announced that with 99% of the vote counted, Yanukovych had 49.4% of the vote while Yushchenko had 46.7%. This was rejected by the opposition, with Yushchenko calling on supporters to protest "the total falsification of the vote." The rally in Kyiv grew in size while large demonstrations were also held elsewhere in Ukraine. Some of the demonstrators set up tents in Kyiv's Independence Square. Later that night, Yushchenko told supporters to stay in the square overnight to keep the tent encampment safe from security forces who wanted to dismantle it.

We have received information that authorities want to destroy our tent city at 3 a.m. ... At two o'clock there should be more of us than now. We must defend every chestnut tree (Note: A chestnut tree is one of the symbols of the city of Kyiv. In 1957 it was part of the Coat of arms of Kyiv.), every tent. We must show to the authorities we are here for a long time... There must be more and more of us here every hour.

City councils of four major cities in Western Ukraine, including L'viv and Ivano-Frankivs'k, refused to recognize the official results and declared that Yushchenko had won the election. The chairman of the Russian State Duma, Boris Gryzlov, acting as the observer, estimated the declared results as final and congratulated Viktor Yanukovich on his victory, following which Vladimir Putin did the same.

Despite the cold weather and fear caused by the relocation of the military vehicles and the special operations personnel, the supporters of Yushchenko gathered around 100-150 thousand followers. All of the leaders of the opposition came to the meeting, including Viktor Yushchenko, Yulia Tymoshenko, the leader of the Socialist Party of Ukraine Oleksandr Moroz, the head of the Party of industrialists and entrepreneurs Anatoliy Kinakh.

Yushchenko called the Ukrainians to the organized resistance movement. Tymoshenko called for the start of mass strikes in industries and higher level educational institutions, as well as for the closure of all the roads, airports, and railways.

The Yushchenko administration requested for an extraordinary seating of the Rada, the annulation of the election in the Donetsk and Luhansk oblasts where no observers or journalists were allowed after the closing of the electoral districts.

Numerous tent-cities of the Pora! organization were installed on the Khreschatyk and on the streets and squares adjacent to it.

The chairman of the United States Senate Committee on Foreign Relations Richard Lugar declared: "Now it became apparent that the aggressive and powerful plan of falsification and infringement at the day of election was conducted whether under the coordination or cooperation with the government." The chairman of the foreign affairs committee of the European Parliament Elmar Brok threatens Ukraine with financial sanctions if the information about the falsification will be confirmed. The Russian ambassador in Washington, D.C., Yuri Ushakov, was invited for a discussion with the assistant of the United States Secretary of State A. Elizabeth Jones who expresses concerns of rushing when the President of the Russian Federation Vladimir Putin congratulated Viktor Yanukovich.

== 23 November ==
Approximately 100,000 Yushchenko supporters gathered in Kyiv awaiting a session of the Verkhovna Rada, Ukraine's parliament, in the hope that it would discuss the accusations of fraud and come to a solution. Thousands of people travelled to the capital from across Ukraine, though their journeys were disrupted by government closures of major roads and airports. Similar gatherings of protesters took place in other major cities, especially L'viv.

In a session of parliament boycotted by supporters of Yanukovych, Yushchenko took the presidential oath although the parliament lacked the quorum to do this legally. The oath-swearing was thus of purely symbolic value.

== 24 November ==
Rumours circulated that Yanukovych and Yushchenko had agreed to hold talks to negotiate over the disputed election results; this was later denied, with the government opposition refusing to meet Yanukovych. Protests continued into a third day in Kyiv after an appeal by Yushchenko for their continuation. More supporters of both sides arrived at the city from outlying areas of the country. Riot police were called to protect the election commission building.

Yushchenko urged his supporters to engage in a series of nationwide general strikes – an "Orange Revolution", after his campaign color – with the intent of crippling the government and forcing Yanukovych to concede defeat. Hundreds of tents were erected in Kyiv's Independence Square and the nearby Lenin Library was taken over to serve as the protesters' headquarters. The protesters also blockaded the Council of Ministers in Kyiv, paralysing the government.

== 25 November ==
The Ukrainian Supreme Court ordered the Central Election Commission not to publish the election results until the opposition's charges of electoral fraud had been addressed. This was seen as a major victory for the opposition, as it effectively suspended official recognition of the results.

== 26 November ==
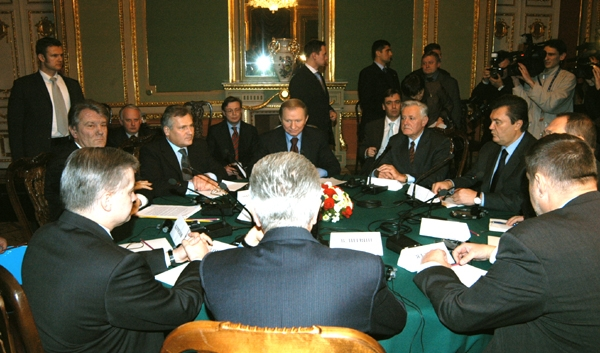
Round table talks in Kyiv. From the left: Viktor Yushchenko, Aleksander Kwaśniewski, Leonid Kuchma, Valdas Adamkus, Viktor Yanukovych, Javier Solana (partly hidden), Ján Kubiš (back), Boris Gryzlov (back), Volodymyr Lytvyn (back)

Round table talks organized by the out-going President Leonid Kuchma began between Yanukovych and Yushchenko. At Kuchma's request high-level foreign mediators also took part in the talks. These were: Polish President Aleksander Kwaśniewski, Lithuanian President Valdas Adamkus, Russian Duma Speaker Boris Gryzlov, European Union's foreign policy chief Javier Solana and OSCE Secretary General Ján Kubiš. Speaker of the Ukrainian parliament, Volodymyr Lytvyn, was also present at the round table. (ABC News)

Television coverage of the opposition rallies, which had hitherto been patchy, was now greatly increased and opposition statements were widely reported for the first time. However, local television stations in Yanukovych's heartland of eastern Ukraine continued to toe the government line by not screening images of the demonstrations.

== 27 November ==
After failing to reach an agreement with Yanukovych, Yushchenko announced that he would only agree to further negotiations if they would be on the subject of holding another vote. (Irish Times)

On the same day the Ukrainian parliament, the Verkhovna Rada, declared the poll results invalid, and also passed a vote of no confidence in Ukraine's Central Election Commission. The declaration was, however, not binding and did not overturn the need for the Supreme Court to issue a ruling. (BBC)

== 28 November ==
The issue of separatism was raised when governors of eastern and southern regions met with Yanukovych and Moscow Mayor Yuriy Luzhkov in Syeverodonetsk, Luhansk region, to discuss autonomy or a separate republic for the Russian-speaking parts of Ukraine. Borys Kolesnikov, president of the Donetsk region council, suggested turning Ukraine into a federation and creating a new South-East Ukrainian Autonomous Republic with its capital in Kharkiv. Yushchenko criticized these ideas as anti-constitutional, and observers suggested that Yanukovych's apparent support for separatism had damaged the standing of the government side.

Over 10,000 IM (Internal Ministry) troops mobilized to put down the protests in Independence Square in Kyiv according to their commander Lt. Gen. Sergei Popkov. The SBU (Ukrainian Security Service, successor to KGB) warned opposition leaders of the crackdown. Oleksandev Galaka, head of GRU (military intelligence) made calls to "prevent bloodshed". Col. Gen. Ihor P. Smesko (SBU chief) and Maj. Gen. Vitaly Romanchenko (military counter-intelligence chief) both warned Popkov to pull back his troops, which he did.

== 29 November and 30 November ==
Talks were held between the government and opposition but ended inconclusively, with Yushchenko reportedly refusing an offer from Yanukovych of the post of prime minister if the opposition accepted Yanukovych as president. Yanukovych's alternative suggestion was a fresh election with neither himself nor Yushchenko as candidates; this was also rejected. The outgoing president Leonid Kuchma announced that he would support holding an entirely new presidential election, not just a re-run of the disputed second round.

On November 29, Yanukovych's campaign manager, Serhiy Tyhypko, announced his resignation from both his position in the Yanukovych campaign and his position as the head of the National Bank of Ukraine. Asked by Channel 5 TV on whether he would possibly run for president if repeat elections went forward, Tyhypko replied positively. Yanukovych reacted angrily to Tyhypko's move, calling him a "mischievous cat".

At the same time, the opposition seemed to suffer a setback as the Ukrainian parliament initially failed to pass a motion of no confidence in the Yanukovych government.

== 1 December ==
The Ukrainian parliament passed a motion of no confidence in the Yanukovych government with 229 votes in favour and voted to create a "government of national trust." The vote urges President Leonid Kuchma to dismiss Yanukovych and appoint a caretaker prime minister, who would probably be parliamentary speaker Volodymyr Lytvyn. Kuchma has the option of rejecting the vote but the parliament can override his veto with a new vote that would need to attract a two-thirds majority (301 of the 450 deputies). Although he has not commented publicly on the vote, his aides have reportedly rejected it.

On the same day, the round table talks were resumed. As a gesture of goodwill, Yushchenko agreed to tell his supporters to cease their blockade of official buildings in Kyiv so that government work could resume.

Yanukovych's camp submitted a complaint to the Ukrainian Supreme Court protesting alleged irregularities in Yushchenko-supporting regions of Ukraine and Kyiv. With both camps now complaining that the election results were falsified and appealing for an annulment, the likelihood of the Supreme Court declaring the results invalid was seen to have increased significantly.

== 2 December ==
Presidents Kuchma and Russian President Vladimir Putin met in Moscow to discuss the ongoing crisis. The two presidents issued a statement calling for an entirely new election—not just a re-run of the disputed second round. This proposal was rejected by Yushchenko's camp, as it would allow Kuchma to stay in power for several more months and could break the momentum of the opposition. Yushchenko declared that he would hold out for an immediate re-run.

President George W. Bush also issued a statement, saying that any new poll should be open, fair and free of foreign influence, and that the will of the Ukrainian people must be known and heard.

Fears were expressed about the damage the crisis could cause to Ukraine's economy. The national currency, the hryvnia, continued to fall against other currencies and the Ukrainian Central Bank imposed a limit on cash withdrawals on all banks to guard against a run on the currency developing.

== 3 December ==
After five days of deliberations, Ukraine's Supreme Court declared the results of the run-off election to be invalid. The court's chairman, Anatoly Yarema, ordered that a repeat vote should take place within three weeks counting from December 5 (i.e., no later than 26 December).

This would be a re-run of the run-off vote only, rather than the wholly new election in three months' time which President Kuchma and Putin had supported. The yukusuchunky camp attacked in court the validity of the second round only, and therefore the Supreme Court could only annul the results of the second round. For the first round to be also annulled and repeated (as the Kuchma/Yanukovych camp desired), further evidence would have had to be brought in that would challenge the validity of the first vote. Neither side, however, chose to do that. Both sides committed themselves to abiding by the court's decision, which they regarded as final.

Meanwhile, the Parliament voted to ask outgoing President Leonid Kuchma to withdraw the country's 1,600 troops from Iraq. The proposal was suggested by the Communist group, and passed by 257 out of the 450-member parliament. Both presidential candidates had previously supported a Ukrainian withdrawal.

== 4 December ==
As Yushchenko supporters have received what they wanted from Ukraine's Supreme Court, protests calmed down in Kyiv although supporters of the Orange Revolution remain in Independence Square.

On this day the Ukrainian parliament failed to adopt election law changes that were requested by the Yushchenko faction. Kuchma accused him of reneging on agreements made on an earlier date. The Socialist and the Communist Parties had agreed to vote in favour of the electoral changes if the opposition in turn supported constitutional changes meant to lessen the power of the President in favour of the Prime Minister and the Parliament. However that agreement fell through when Yushchenko said that constitutional changes would be considered only after the elections.

== 5 December ==
In an interview on BBC television Yushchenko asked for the international community not to interfere in the new election, although he welcomed foreign observers.

Yushchenko's most prominent ally, the politician and businesswoman Yulia Tymoshenko, stated that she would like to be appointed prime minister if Yushchenko wins.

In his first interview since the Supreme Court ruling, President Kuchma pledged to abide by its decision and ruled out any repressive measures, such as the use of force or the introduction of a state of emergency. He also said that he was prepared to reform the 15-member Central Election Commission, which had been strongly criticised for apparently colluding in the fixing of the run-off vote. However, he refused to meet demands to sack Yanukovych, potentially setting up a fresh confrontation with the Ukrainian parliament, which had earlier passed a motion of no confidence in the government.

== 6 December ==
Speaking in Turkey, Russia's President Putin strongly warned against foreign interference in Ukraine's new election, accusing Western countries of trying to impose their definition of democracy on Ukraine.

Yushchenko continued to campaign for amendments to the election laws that would ban voting by absentee ballots and voting in people's homes, both of which were seen as being among the most abused election provisions in the first two votes. He also rejected proposals by Kuchma that the powers of the president should be diluted and partially given to the parliament, in which pro-Yanukovych forces are still powerful.

== 7 December - 8 December ==
After several days of heated debate, the Verkhovna Rada (Ukraine's parliament) agreed reform measures to change the electoral laws and institute changes to the governance of Ukraine. Key elements of the reforms include:

- Changes to the Central Election Commission and dismissal of some of its members;
- Tighter rules on absentee ballots and home voting to reduce the possibility of ballot fraud;
- Reduced presidential powers, with the president confined to appointing only the prime minister, defence and foreign ministers, subject to the approval of parliament;
- Greater powers for the regions, to reduce tensions between the west and east of the country.

The reform package received the approval of 402 of the 450 parliamentary deputies (with 21 votes against and 19 abstentions) and was immediately signed into law by President Kuchma. In response, the opposition agreed to end the blockade of government buildings from 1900 (local time) on December 8.

The reforms shift the balance of power within Ukraine, moving from the strong presidential system to a parliamentary system. The outcome is seen as a compromise between the rival camps, as the new election rules will improve Yushchenko's chances of victory but the constitutional changes will enable the Kuchma/Yanukovych camp to exercise influence through parliament and the regions following the election.

Kuchma granted Yanukovych leave of absence to contest the December 26 election, and appointed First Deputy Prime Minister Mykola Azarov to serve as acting prime minister.

The Times reported that Austrian doctors had confirmed that Yushchenko's mysterious illness was due to poisoning from a biological or chemical agent. Doctor Michael Zimpfer, president of the Rudolfinerhaus clinic, stated that his illness had resulted from "high concentrations of dioxin, most likely orally administered".

== 6 January ==
Yanukovych will challenge his defeat of the runoff election at the Supreme Court on Thursday, even though he has acknowledged he has no hope of success. The appeal was later rejected.

== 10 January ==
At 11:30 p.m. (Kyiv time), the Central Election Commission of Ukraine, in a live TV broadcast of the Commission meeting, officially announced that Viktor Yushchenko won the presidential elections. Results of the repeated second round are as follows:

number of enlisted voters:	37 657 704	
number of handed-out ballots:	29 073 276	
number of votes cast:	29 068 971	
number of invalid ballots:	422 492	
votes for Yushchenko:	15 115 712	51.99%
votes for Yanukovych:	12 848 528	44.20%
votes against both:	682 239	2.34%

== 11 January ==
The Supreme Court of Ukraine temporarily suspended the publication of the official results of the election, until the appeal of Yanukovych regarding the results would be considered by the Court.

== 20 January ==
At 2:40 a.m. (Kyiv time), the Supreme Court of Ukraine announced its decision to decline the appeal of Yanukovych. Election results (Act No. 14 of the Central Election Commission of Ukraine dated 10 January 2005) are being published in the official newspapers of the Verkhovna Rada and the Cabinet of Ministers of Ukraine.

The Verkhovna Rada of Ukraine terminated the authority of Viktor Yushchenko as the parliamentary member (on his request). The parliament also designated 23 January 2005, noon (Kyiv time), as the day and time of the ceremonial assembly to hold the inauguration.

== 23 January ==
At noon (local time) Viktor Yushchenko is inaugurated as president of Ukraine.

== 24 January ==
Ukraine's new president, Viktor Yushchenko, appoints Yulia Tymoshenko acting prime minister.

== See also ==
- Timeline of the Euromaidan
