= Paulos Mantovanis =

Cypriot Eastern Orthodox metropolitan bishop

Paulos Mantovanis (born Panagiotis Mantovanis, Greek: Παναγιώτης Μαντοβάνης; 21 November 1945 – 1 October 2011) was the Eastern Orthodox metropolitan bishop of Kyrenia, Cyprus, from 1994 until his death.

== Biography ==
Born on November 21, 1945, in Larnaca. After graduating from the English school in Nicosia, he entered the Pancyprian Gymnasium.

From 1968 to 1972 he studied at the Theological Faculty of the University of Athens, after which he returned to Cyprus, where he worked as a lay preacher and catechist of the Archdiocese of Cyprus. At the same time he taught at the Saint Barnabas theological Seminary, and then at the English school of Nicosia.

In 1977, on a competitive basis, he received a scholarship from the Greek State Scholarship Fund and for three years interned in history and theology at Oxford University.

On September 14, 1980, bishop Barnabas (Solomou) of Salamis ordained him a deacon, and on November 4, 1981, Archbishop Chrysostomos I of Cyprus ordained him a priest with elevation to the rank of archimandrite, after which he was appointed rector of the Church of the Apostle Barnabas in Dasoupol.

In 1985 at Oxford University he awarded the degree of Doctor of Philosophy for the thesis "The Eucharistic theology of Nicholas Kabasilas".

On October 23, 1988, he was elected abbot of the Machairas Monastery, and on November 23, 1993, he was appointed protosinkell of the Metropolis of Kyrenia.

On April 5, 1994, he was elected Metropolitan of Kyrenia by secret ballot, and on April 10 of the same year he was consecrated bishop in the Church of the Annunciation of the Most Holy Theotokos in Palluriotissa.

From January 1996 to September 1998, he temporarily ruled the Metropolis of Morphou.

Since the beginning of August 2011, he has been in the intensive care unit in one of the private clinics.

He died from 1 to 2 October in Nicosia after a long illness. He was buried on September 3, in the family crypt in Larnaca.
