= Arnaud Jacomet =

French historian and secretary-general of the Western European Union

Arnaud Marie Pierre André Jacomet (20 October 1946, Paris – 14 October 2011, Brussels) was a French historian and the final Secretary-General of the Western European Union (WEU).

Jacomet studied history and worked at the Paris West University Nanterre La Défense. He was diplomatic adviser on the WEU staff from the Alfred Cahen administration (1985–1989) onwards. On 25 November 2009, he succeeded Javier Solana as Secretary-General of the Western European Union. Jacomet completed the task of finishing the transfer of the remaining WEU functions to the EU Commission and the closure of the organisation. The WEU dissolved on 30 June 2011. Jacomet died of cancer a few months later.

Political offices
Preceded by Javier Solana	Secretary General of the Western European Union; 2009–2011	Succeeded by - (WEU dissolved)
