= Yelena Chernykh =

Russian actress (1979–2011)

Yelena Chernykh Cyrillic: Елена Черных (or Helen Black)
- Born: Yelena Kolesnichenko; August 24, 1979; Volzhskoye, Russian SFSR, USSR
- Died: October 4, 2011 (aged 32); Novoanninsky, Novoanninsky District, Volgograd Oblast, Russia
- Occupation: Stage actress
- Years active: 2001–2011
- Spouse(s): Yegor Chernykh (m? - 2011 (her death); 1 child

Yelena Chernykh (Cyrillic: Елена Черных) (August 24, 1979 – October 4, 2011) was a Russian theatre actress. She has been called "хрупкая красавица и вместе с тем необычайно выносливая актриса" (a fragile beauty and yet extraordinarily hardy actress).

== Death ==
The 32-year-old actress was killed in a car crash on 4 October 2011 in Novoanninsky, along with fellow actors, 59-year-old Aleksandr Yegorov and 52-year-old Valentina Yudina. Chernykh and Yegorov, who both died in the same collision, were considered favorite artists of the "Волгоградского музыкально-драматического казачьего театра" (Volgograd Music and Drama Theatre of the Cossack).

At the time her death, Yelena was married to Yegor Chernykh, with whom she had one daughter.

== Theater ==
Her better known theater works include

- Эй, ты, здравствуй! (Hey, you, hello!) by Г. Мамлина (G. Mamlina)
- Андрей-Стрелок и Марья-Голубка (Andrew, Archer and Maria Dove) by И. Токмаковой (I. Tokmakova)
- Хуторяне (Hutoryane) by А. Копкова (A. Kopkova)
- Чубатые ребяты (Curly guys) by Ю. Войтова (Yu Voitova)
- От любви до ненависти (From love to hate) by Н. Старицкого (N. Staritskogo)
- Святочная история (Yule Story) by Чарльза Диккенса (Charles Dickens)
- Эшелон (Echelon) by М.М. Рощина (MM Roshchin)
- От сердца к сердцу (Heart to Heart) by Ю. Войтова (Yu Voitova)
- Моя граница — моя судьба (My border - my destiny) by Ю. Войтова (Yu Voitova)
- Кошкин дом (Cat House) by С.Я. Маршака (SY Marshak).
