= Mario Agliati =

Swiss writer, journalist, and historian (1922–2011)

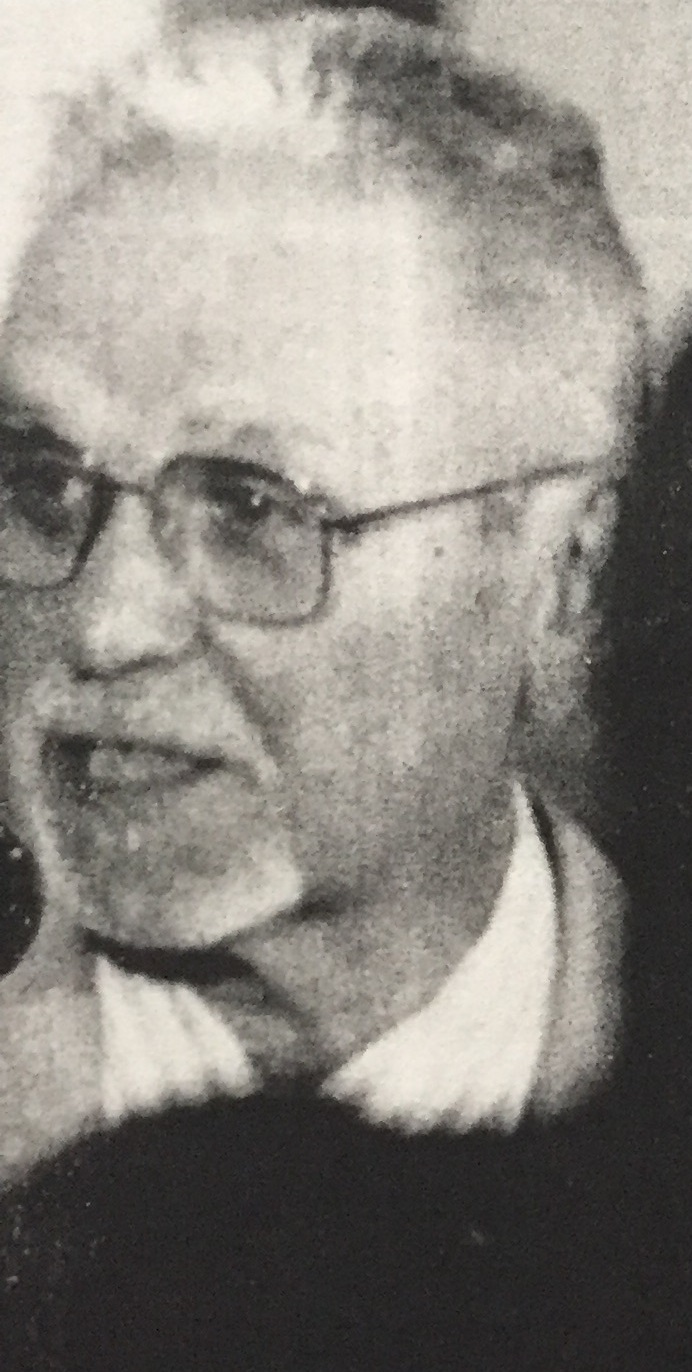
Mario Agliati

Mario Agliati (29 January 1922 in Lugano – 15 October 2011 in Lugano) was a Swiss-Italian journalist, writer and historian. He contributed to the Gazzetta Ticinese and the Corriere del Ticino and in 1953 founded a review entitled Il Cantonetto.

== Works ==
- La sezione Baretti, 1951
- La sposina del 1909, 1959
- Lugano del buon tempo, 1963
- L'erba voglio, 1996
- Ottobre 1925: l'Europa a Locarno, 1975
- I problemi del professor Pilati, 1987
- La profezia del dottor Donzelli, 1991
- Il tempietto di due Santi e di due città. Da Sant'Antonio da Padova in Lugano a San Lucio papa in Brugherio, 1994
- Lugano: racconto di ieri e di oggi, 1999

== Bibliography (in Italian) ==
- Giovanni Orelli, Svizzera Italiana, Editrice La Scuola, Brescia 1986.
- AA.VV., Dizionario delle letterature svizzere, 1991, 12.
- Luigi Menapace, Lo stile di Agliati, in Il Cantonetto, 2, 1992, 42ss.
- Luciano Vaccaro, Giuseppe Chiesi, Fabrizio Panzera, Terre del Ticino. Diocesi di Lugano, Editrice La Scuola, Brescia 2003, pp. 191 nota, 192 nota, 257 nota, 453.
- Carlo Agliati (ed.), "Una presenza discosta. Testimonianze di amici in ricordo di Mario Agliati 1922–2011", in Il Cantonetto, numero speciale, Lugano giugno 2012.
