= David Utz =

American surgeon

David Charles Utz (December 2, 1923 – October 30, 2011) was an American surgeon. Utz was the surgeon who removed United States President Ronald Reagan's prostate in 1987.

During his career her wrote 143 articles that appeared in medical journals.

Utz died on October 30, 2011, due to congestive heart failure aged 87.
