= Marios Leousis =

Greek magician

Marios Leousis (1936 – 31 October 2011) was a Greek magician. Leousis appeared in several post-war cabarets and toured through Europe.

He died on 31 October 2011.
