= Mathur Krishnamurthy =

Kannada writer

Mathoor Krishnamurthy was a Kannada writer and former Director of the Bharatiya Vidya Bhavan, Bangalore. He was also instrumental in establishing the Bharatiya Vidya Bhavan in London. He was a Padma Shri awardee. He died on 6 October 2011 at the age of 82.
