= John Morris (South African cricketer) =

South African cricketer (1940–2011)

Personal information
- Full name: John Douglas Morris
- Born: 1 July 1940; Cape Town, South Africa
- Died: 26 October 2011 (aged 71); Hillcrest, KwaZulu-Natal, South Africa
- Source: ESPNcricinfo, 19 June 2016

John Morris (1 July 1940 – 26 October 2011) was a South African cricketer. He played eight first-class matches for Western Province between 1961 and 1963.
