= José Cutileiro =

Portuguese diplomat and writer (1934–2020)

José Pires Cutileiro
- Born: 20 November 1934; Évora, Portugal
- Died: 17 May 2020 (aged 85); Brussels, Belgium

Academic background
- Education: University of Oxford

José Pires Cutileiro (20 November 1934 – 17 May 2020) was a Portuguese diplomat and writer. He was a representative to the Council of Europe, Secretary General of the Western European Union (WEU), and an envoy to the UN Commissioner for Human Rights in Bosnia-Herzegovina and Serbia. He was on the faculty of the Institute for Advanced Study in Princeton, New Jersey.

== Biography ==
=== Early life and family ===
Cutileiro's father, José Jacinto Cutileiro, a republican and secularist doctor, faced political problems with the Salazar regime, and chose to leave the country to join the World Health Organization (WHO), taking his wife and children, then teenagers, to live in Switzerland, India and Afghanistan. In 1952 they were the first Portuguese citizens, of which there is record, to live in Afghanistan. Cutileiro was then 17 years old.

José is the brother of the famous sculptor João Cutileiro.

His son, also named José Cutileiro, was born in Lisbon in 1959. When he was 18 years old moved to the Netherlands. He was a musician, journalist and writer. In the 1980s he started as guitarist in the band “De Ziffels” in Groningen, the Netherlands. From 2000 he was television and radio reporter for regional broadcaster OOG. He died on 22 June 2020, after being ill for a long time, aged 61. His death was a month after the death of his father.

=== Studies and academic career ===
Back in Portugal, Cutileiro studied architecture and medicine at the Technical University of Lisbon and at the Classical University of Lisbon. He then went to Oxford University getting a degree in anthropology in 1964, his PhD in 1968, and became a Research Fellow of St. Antony's College from 1968 to 1971. From 1971 to 1974 he taught social anthropology at the London School of Economics and Political Science.

From September 2001 to June 2004 Cutileiro was the George F. Kennan Professor at the Institute for Advanced Study in Princeton.

=== Diplomatic career ===
With the Carnation Revolution, Cutileiro was invited by Mário Soares to enter the diplomatic service, having started by being a cultural attaché of the Portuguese embassy in London.

From 1974 to 1994 Cutileiro worked for the Portuguese Foreign Service and from 1977 to 1980 was the first permanent Portuguese representative to the Council of Europe. He served as the Portuguese ambassador to Mozambique (1980-1983) and to South Africa (1989-1991), at the time of the release of Nelson Mandela from prison. Cutileiro also led the Portuguese Delegation to the OSCE Conference on Disarmament in Stockholm from 1984 to 1986.

In 1988 he negotiated the accession of Portugal to the Western European Union. In 1992, as coordinator of the European Community's Conference on Yugoslavia, he presided over talks on future constitutional arrangements for Bosnia and Herzegovina. Several plans were proposed before and during the Bosnian War by the European Community and the United Nations. Cutileiro was co-author of the Carrington–Cutileiro plan, sometimes known as the Lisbon Agreement, in February 1992, an attempt to prevent Bosnia-Herzegovina sliding into war.

From 1994 to 1999 he was Secretary-General of the Western European Union, at that time the only European defense organization. In 1999, it was agreed that the holder of the newly created post of High Representative for the Common Foreign and Security Policy of the European Union should also be the Secretary-General of the WEU. Thus, Cutileiro was the last independent general secretary of this institution and was succeeded by Javier Solana.

From 2001 to 2003 he served as a Special Envoy of the UN Commissioner for Human Rights in Bosnia-Herzegovina and Serbia.

He served as adviser for the Portuguese presidency of the EU Council and, in 2005, as special political advisor to José Manuel Durão Barroso as president of the European Commission.

=== Writing career ===
As a writer, Cutileiro is best known for a fictionalized history written under the pseudonym A. B. Kotter. Kotter is supposedly an elitist expatriate English aristocrat living in Colares with his pro-fascist mother. The stories describe their experiences living in post-revolutionary Portugal. These chronicles were serialized in the British newspaper The Independent between 1993 and 1998 and were collected into the book Bilhetes de Colares in 2004.

Cutileiro wrote essays, poetry books and other works of an anthropological nature, the most recent publication being the “Inventário: Desabafos e Divagações de Um Sético”.

He also wrote obituaries for the Expresso, including those for Mário Soares, Maria de Jesus and Fidel Castro. In the last years he also held an international relations column entitled 'The World of Others'.

=== Death ===
Cutileiro died at a hospital in Brussels on 17 May 2020.

== Works ==
- A Portuguese Rural Society [Ricos e pobres no Alentejo. Uma sociedade portuguesa rural]. Oxford, Clarendon Press, 1971, ISBN 0198231733
- Situation of human rights in parts of south-eastern Europe : report of the Special Representative of the Commission on Human Rights on the Situation of Human Rights in Bosnia and Herzegovina and the Federal Republic of Yugoslavia, Geneva : UN, 8 January 2002, OCLC 83338101
- Life and death of others: the international community and the end of Yugoslavia [Vida e morte dos outros : a comunidade internacional e o fim da Jugoslávia], Lisboa, Portugal : Imprensa de Ciências Sociais, 2003, ISBN 9726711061
- Bilhetes de Colares: 1982-1998 [writing as A. B. Kotter], Assírio & Alvim, Lisbon 2007 (in Portuguese), ISBN 972371258X

== Awards and honors ==
- Ordem Militar de Cristo
- Order of Prince Henry
- Portuguese Order of Christ
- 2009 Grande Prémio de Crónica from the Portuguese Writers Association for his fictional chronicle Bilhetes de Colares (writing under his pseudonym A B Kotter)
