= Xin Huguang =

Chinese composer

- Traditional Chinese: 辛滬光
- Simplified Chinese: 辛沪光
Transcriptions
Standard Mandarin
- Hanyu Pinyin: Xīn Hùguāng

Xin Huguang (16 October 1933 – 17 October 2011) was a modern Chinese composer. Born in Shanghai, her family came from Jiangxi in China's south. In 1948 she went to Nanchang, the capital of Jiangxi, to commence musical studies. In 1951, she enlisted at the Conservatory of the Central Music University in Beijing. Her classmate Mei Li Qi Ge introduced her to Mongolian folk music and this idiom informed her composing. She commenced collecting tapes and written articles on the subject. She met her future husband Bao Yu Shan, from Ke Zuo Zhong Qi in Mongolia while he was studying saxophone at the Conservatory. At the completion of her studies she composed Gada Meilin as a symphonic tone poem. The premier performance caused a stir as few could credit a 23-year-old female graduate with its composition. In that year she went with her husband to teach and compose music in Mongolia where she remained for the next 26 years. In 1982 she returned to Beijing to continue her work. In 1991 she visited America. She had three sons, the third of which, San Bao, was also a composer.
