= George Alexander (American musician) =

American musician

Alexander, George
- Born: Clifford Alexander Wiley; July 9, 1867; Baltimore, Maryland
- Died: March 2, 1913 (aged 45) New York
- Genres: popular
- Occupation: singer
- Years active: 1903 – 1913
- Labels: Columbia, Zonophone, Victor

George Alexander (July 9, 1867 – March 2, 1913) was a baritone and pioneer recording artist who made several best-selling records for Columbia Records in the first decade of the 20th century.

== Biography ==
George Alexander was born in Baltimore on July 9, 1867, his birth name was Clifford Alexander Wiley. His initial recording activity was for Zonophone Records in 1902, and he subsequently recorded for Columbia Talking Machine Co. in 1903, where he produced the majority of his output. He also recorded a few sides for Victor Records in 1903. The same year, he made cylinder records for Edison under the pseudonym Arthur Clifford. He died on March 2, 1913, in New York at the age of 45.

He died of heart disease and Bright's disease in New York City on 2 March 1913 and is buried in New Jersey Cemetery in North Bergen New Jersey.

== Style and popularity as recording artist ==
He has been noted for his "robust sonority and precise diction." Joel Whitburn, in his chart reconstructions, estimates that Alexander had three records that would have made the Billboard charts had they existed: Mighty Lak' a Rose (Columbia disc 1585, cylinder 32295) at #3 in December 1903; America (Columbia disc 3099, cylinder 32637) at #7 in May 1905, and Dearie (Columbia disc 3378, cylinder 32928) at #10 in July 1906.
