= Lulama Masikazana =

South African cricketer (1973–2011)

Lulama Masikazana (6 February 1973 – 7 October 2011) was a South African cricketer who played first-class cricket as a wicketkeeper for Eastern Province from 1993 to 2000.

He was born in Port Elizabeth. As a schoolboy in 1991, he was one of the first black players to play for the South African Schools cricket team, in a team which included future Test cricketers Shaun Pollock, Herschelle Gibbs and Nicky Boje.

He made his first-class debut in November 1993 playing as wicketkeeper for the Eastern Province B team against Boland B in the UCB Bowl. In 38 first-class matches, mainly for Eastern Province or Eastern Province B, He scored one first-class half-century, dismissed for exactly 50 against Boland in November 1997, and took 111 dismissals, including 10 stumpings. He also took 23 dismissals in 24 List A one-day matches.

He died in Port Elizabeth after a sudden illness, 4 months short of his 39th birthday.
