= Ken Meyerson =

American tennis agent (1964–2011)

- Born: 1964
- Died: 19 October 2011 (aged 46–47); Miami, U.S.
- Education: University of Portland and American University in Paris
- Spouse: Claudia Meyerson
- Children: 2

Ken Meyerson (1964 – October 19, 2011) was an American tennis agent, and the president of Lagardere Unlimited agency from 2009 till his death in 2011.

== Career ==
Before joining Lagardere, Meyerson was president of BEST Tennis from 2006-09. During a nearly 25-year career in tennis that began in 1987, Meyerson also worked with ProServ, one of the earliest sports management firms, and the SFX Sports Group. During his career, he represented players including Andy Roddick, Chris Evert and Justine Henin.

== Death ==
Meyerson died of a heart attack in his sleep aged 47 on October 19, 2011.

== Early life ==
Meyerson was a keen tennis player and played in high school and during his college years, he played for a season at University of Portland before graduating from the American University in Paris with a BA in Business Administration.
