= George Alexander (English cricketer) =

English cricketer

Personal information
- Full name: George Caledon Alexander
- Born: 4 October 1842; Epsom, Surrey, England
- Died: 8 April 1913 (aged 70); Westminster, London, England

Domestic team information
- Years: Team
- 1869: Surrey

Career statistics
Competition	First-class
Matches	3
Runs scored	14
Batting average	3.50
100s/50s	0/0
Top score	10
Catches/stumpings	0/–
- Source: Cricinfo, 23 June 2012

George Caledon Alexander (4 October 1842 – 8 April 1913) was an English first-class cricketer. Alexander's batting style is unknown. He was born at Epsom, Surrey.

Alexander made three first-class appearances. The first came for the Gentlemen of the South against the Players of the South at The Oval in 1866. His second appearance came for Surrey against Sussex in 1869 at the Royal Brunswick Ground, Hove. His third first-class appearance came in 1876 for the Gentlemen of England against Oxford University at the Magdalen Ground, Oxford. He scored 14 runs in his three matches, at an average of 3.50, with a high score of 10.

He died at Westminster, London, on 8 April 1913.
