= George Alexander (Canadian football) =

Profile
- Position: Halfback

Personal information
- Born: July 7, 1918; Calgary, Alberta
- Died: October 7, 2011 (aged 93); Calgary, Alberta
- Listed height: 5 ft 8 in (1.73 m)
- Listed weight: 180 lb (82 kg)

Career information
- Junior: East Calgary

Career history
- 1946–1947: Calgary Stampeders

George Francis Alexander (July 7, 1918 – October 7, 2011) was a Canadian professional football halfback who played for the Calgary Stampeders of the Canadian Football League. He played in all 16 regular season games from 1946 to 1947.
