= Jan Marian Kaczmarek =

Jan Kaczmarek

Minister of Science, Higher Education and Technology
- In office 29 March 1972 – 17 December 1974

Personal details
- Born: 2 February 1920 Pabianice, Łódź Voivodeship, Poland
- Died: 18 October 2011 (aged 91) Le Chesnay
- Spouse: Olga
- Children: Andrzej, Elzbieta

Military service
- Rank: Major

Jan Marian Kaczmarek (February 2, 1920 – October 18, 2011) was a Polish mechanical engineer and university professor. He was appointed Minister of Science, Higher Education and Technology under Władysław Gomułka following the 1968 Polish political crisis.

== Life ==
Kaczmarek was born in Pabianice, Second Polish Republic. In 1938 he obtained a pilot license and in 1939, after the invasion of Poland by Nazi Germany and the Soviet Union, he took part in the September campaign as pilot of the Polish Air Force. He was wounded in battle and recuperated at a military hospital in Vilnius. Subsequently, he became member of the Lithuanian Resistance Movement, and in 1942 joined the Polish underground Armia Krajowa (Home Army) where he remained until 1945. After the end of the war Kaczmarek settled in Kraków and took up studies at the AGH University of Science and Technology. In 1948, he obtained the M.Sc. in mechanical engineering and began working for the local industry. For over a decade between 1957–68, he was the Managing Director of the Institute of Advanced Manufacturing Technologies in Kraków. He earned his Ph.D. in 1958 and D.Sc. in 1962. Kaczmarek was appointed Associate Professor in 1962 and Full Professor in 1969. Between 1965 and 1968, he served as Vice-Rector and in 1968 as Rector of the Tadeusz Kościuszko University of Technology.

Kaczmarek relocated to Warsaw during the 1968 Polish political crisis and was appointed Minister of Science, Higher Education and Technology under Władysław Gomułka. In the next decade, he served as Secretary of the Polish Academy of Sciences. Kaczmarek was married to Olga; he has two children, four grandchildren, and four great-grandchildren.

== Honours and awards ==
- Honoris causa:
  - Chemnitz University of Technology, Germany (1973)
  - Bauman Moscow State Technical University, Russia (1974)
  - Poznan University of Technology, Poland (2001)
  - Koszalin University of Technology, Poland (2003)
- Honorary Scholar - International Institute for Applied Systems Analysis, IIASA, Luxemburg (1993)

== Awards ==
Awards
- Legion of Honour, Grand Officer, France 1972

- Ordre des Palmes Académiques, Golden order, France 1971 Order of Polonia Restituta, Commander's Cross, Poland 1974 Order of Polonia Restituta, Knight's Cross, Poland1962

- Officier, Golden order, Ordre des Palmes Académiques, France (1971)
- Grand Officer Legion of Honour, France (1972)
- Order of Marin Drinov, Bulgarian Academy of Sciences, Bulgary (1969)
- Order of Polonia Restituta, Poland
  - Commander's Cross (1974)
  - Knight's Cross (1962)
- Medal im. M. Kopernika, PAN, Poland (1977)
- Honorary citizenship
  - Pabianice, Poland
