= Samdup Taso =

Samdup Taso (b. 1928; d. 29 October 2011, aged 83) was the last shaman to lead the indigenous Lepcha people of Sikkim (now part of India) in prayers to the mountain deity of Kanchenjunga, the world's third-highest mountain peak.

Taso was an hereditary priest (the "Bongthing"), who would lead prayers culminating in special rituals during the month of "Kursong" (February–March).

Taso did not nominate a successor, and left the native villagers in the remote Dzongu region of north Sikkim without a 'Khangchendzonga Bongthings' (priest), thus ending an 800-year ritual.
