= Gunilla von Post =

Swedish noble (1932–2011)

- Born: 10 July 1932; Stockholm, Sweden
- Died: 14 October 2011 (aged 79); Palm Beach, Florida, U.S.
- Occupation: Swedish noble

Karin Adele Gunilla von Post Miller (10 July 1932 – 14 October 2011) was a Swedish aristocrat noted for a book outlining an intimate relationship with then-Senator John F. Kennedy in the 1950s, titled Love, Jack, published in 1997. In 2010, she auctioned letters written by Kennedy to her.

Kennedy met Gunilla von Post one month before his marriage to Jacqueline Lee Bouvier during the summer of 1953 while on holiday on the French Riviera.

In 2015, a leather jacket that had once belonged to Kennedy and which he had left with von Post was unearthed by the senior chaplain of The King's School, Canterbury. He then brought it to a November 2015 filming of an episode of the Antiques Roadshow at Walmer Castle in Kent, where it was valued in excess of £100,000 (circa $152,000 US dollars) by one of the show's expert appraisers, Jon Baddeley.
