= José Ángel Ibáñez =

Mexican educator and politician

- Born: 31 May 1950; Canatlán, Durango, Mexico
- Died: 30 September 2011 (aged 61); Durango, Mexico
- Occupations: Educator and politician
- Political party: PRI

José Ángel Ibáñez Montes (31 May 1950 – 30 September 2011) was a Mexican educator and politician affiliated with the Institutional Revolutionary Party. He served as Deputy of the LIX Legislature of the Mexican Congress as a plurinominal representative.
