= Enlargement of NATO =

Accession of new countries to NATO

External videos
- Q&A interview with Sarotte on Not One Inch, April 17, 2022, C-SPAN

Chronology of membership of the European portion of NATO

NATO is a military alliance of thirty-two European and North American countries that constitutes a system of collective defense. The process of joining the alliance is governed by Article 10 of the North Atlantic Treaty, which allows for the invitation of "other European States" only. Countries wishing to join must meet certain requirements and complete a multi-step process involving political dialogue and military integration. The accession process is overseen by the North Atlantic Council, NATO's governing body. NATO was formed in 1949 with twelve founding members and has added new members ten times. The first additions were Greece and Turkey in 1952. In May 1955, West Germany joined NATO, which was one of the conditions agreed to as part of the end of the country's occupation by France, the United Kingdom, and the United States, prompting the Soviet Union to form its own collective security alliance (commonly called the Warsaw Pact) later that month. Following the end of the Franco regime, newly democratic Spain chose to join NATO in 1982.

In 1990, negotiators reached an agreement that a reunified Germany would be in NATO under West Germany's existing membership. Following the dissolution of the Soviet Union in 1991, many former Warsaw Pact and post-Soviet states sought to join NATO. Poland, Hungary, and the Czech Republic became members in 1999, amid much debate within NATO itself. NATO then formalized the process of joining the organization with "Membership Action Plans", which aided the accession of seven Central and Eastern Europe countries shortly before the 2004 Istanbul summit: Bulgaria, Estonia, Latvia, Lithuania, Romania, Slovakia, and Slovenia. Two countries on the Adriatic Sea—Albania and Croatia—joined on 1 April 2009 before the 2009 Strasbourg–Kehl summit. The next member states to join NATO were Montenegro in June 2017, and North Macedonia in March 2020.

NATO has bordered the Russian Federation since the 1990s. Russia invaded Ukraine in 2022 after Russian president Vladimir Putin said that NATO military infrastructure was being built up inside Ukraine and that Ukraine's potential membership was a threat. Russia's invasion prompted Finland and Sweden to apply for NATO membership in May 2022. Finland joined in April 2023 and Sweden in March 2024. Ukraine applied for membership in September 2022 after Russia illegally annexed the country's southeast. Two other states have informed NATO of their membership aspirations: Bosnia and Herzegovina and Georgia. Kosovo also aspires to join. Joining the alliance is a debated topic in several other European countries outside the alliance, including Armenia, Austria, Cyprus, Ireland, Malta, Moldova, and Serbia.

== Past enlargements ==
=== Cold War ===
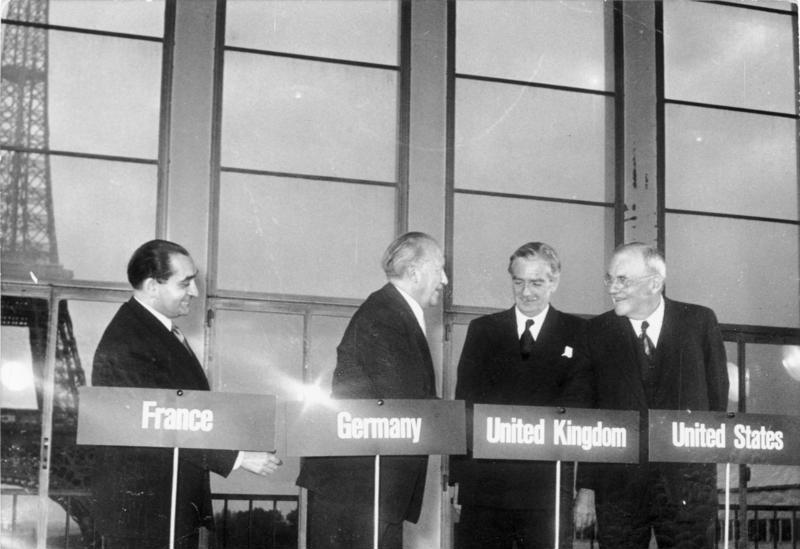
Negotiations in London and Paris in 1954 ended the allied occupation of West Germany and allowed for its rearmament as a NATO member.

Twelve countries were part of NATO at the time of its founding: Belgium, Canada, Denmark, France, Iceland, Italy, Luxembourg, the Netherlands, Norway, Portugal, the United Kingdom, and the United States. The start of the Cold War between 1947 and 1953 saw an ideological and economic divide between the capitalist states of Western Europe backed by the United States with its Marshall Plan and the Truman Doctrine, and the communist states of Eastern Europe, backed by the Soviet Union. As such, opposition to Soviet-style communism became a defining characteristic of the organization and the anti-communist governments of Greece, which had just fought a civil war against a pro-communist army, and Turkey, whose newly-elected Democrat Party were staunchly pro-American, came under internal and external pressure to join the alliance, which both did in February 1952.

The US, France, and the UK initially agreed to end its occupation of Germany in May 1952 under the Bonn–Paris conventions on the condition that the new Federal Republic of Germany, commonly called West Germany, would join NATO, because of concerns about allowing a non-aligned West Germany to rearm. The allies also dismissed Soviet proposals of a neutral-but-united Germany as insincere. France, however, delayed the start of the process, in part on the condition that a referendum be held in Saar on its future status, and a revised treaty was signed on 23 October 1954, allowing the North Atlantic Council to formally invite West Germany. Ratification of its membership was completed in May 1955. That month the Soviet Union established its own collective defense alliance, commonly called the Warsaw Pact, in part as a response to West German membership in NATO. In 1966, French president Charles de Gaulle announced the withdrawal of French forces from the integrated military structure of the NATO and ordered the removal of all foreign NATO forces from French territory. In 1974, Greece suspended its NATO membership over the Turkish invasion of Cyprus, but rejoined in 1980 with Turkey's cooperation.

Relations between NATO members and Spain under dictator Francisco Franco were strained for many years, in large part because Franco had cooperated with the Axis powers during World War II. Though staunchly anti-communist, Franco reportedly feared in 1955 that a Spanish application for NATO membership might be vetoed by its members at the time. Franco however did sign regular defense agreements with individual members, including the 1953 Pact of Madrid with the United States, which allowed their use of air and naval bases in Spain. Following Franco's death in 1975, Spain began a transition to democracy, and came under international pressure to normalize relations with other western democracies. Prime Minister Adolfo Suárez, first elected in 1976, proceeded carefully on relations with NATO because of divisions in his coalition over the US's use of Spanish bases. In February 1981, following a failed coup attempt, Leopoldo Calvo-Sotelo became Prime Minister and campaigned strongly for NATO membership, in part to improve civilian control over the military, and Spain's NATO membership was approved in May 1982. A Spanish referendum in 1986 confirmed popular support for remaining in NATO.

During the mid-1980s the strength and cohesion of the Warsaw Pact, which had served as the main institution rivaling NATO, began to deteriorate. By 1989 the Soviet Union was unable to stem the democratic and nationalist movements which were rapidly gaining ground. Poland held multiparty elections in June 1989 that ousted the Soviet allied Polish Workers' Party and the peaceful opening of the Berlin Wall that November symbolized the end of the Warsaw Pact as a way of enforcing Soviet control. The fall of the Berlin Wall is recognized to be the end of the Cold War and ushered in a new period for Europe and NATO enlargement.

=== German reunification ===
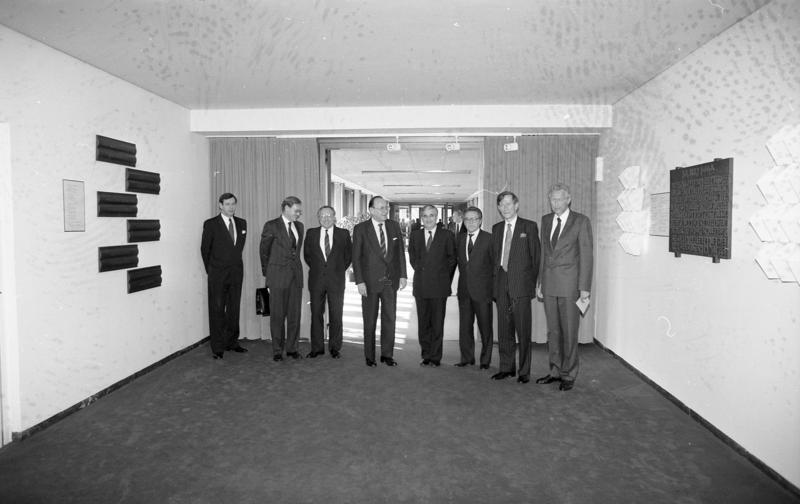
Hans-Dietrich Genscher and other negotiators during the first round of talks for the Two Plus Four Treaty

Negotiations to reunite East and West Germany took place throughout 1990, resulting in the signing of the Two Plus Four Treaty in September 1990 and East Germany officially joining the Federal Republic of Germany on 3 October 1990. To secure Soviet approval of a united Germany remaining in NATO, the treaty prohibited foreign troops and nuclear weapons from being stationed in the former East Germany, though an addendum signed by all parties specified that foreign NATO troops could be deployed east of the Cold War line after the Soviet departure at the discretion of the government of a united Germany, permitting NATO's enlargement to the east. There is no mention of any other country joining NATO in the September–October 1990 agreements on German reunification. Whether or not representatives from NATO member states informally committed to not enlarge NATO into other parts of Eastern Europe during these and contemporary negotiations with Soviet counterparts has long been a matter of dispute among historians and international relations scholars.

With several countries threatening to withdraw from the Warsaw Pact, the Soviet military relinquished control of the organization in March 1991, allowing it to be formally dissolved that July. The so-called "parade of sovereignties" declared by republics in the Baltic and Caucasus regions of the Soviet Union and their War of Laws with the government in Moscow further fractured its cohesion. Following the failure of the New Union Treaty, the leadership of the remaining constituent republics of the Soviet Union, starting with Ukraine in August 1991, declared their independence and initiated the dissolution of the Soviet Union, which was completed in December of that year. Russia, led by President Boris Yeltsin, became the most prominent of the independent states. The Westernization trend of many former Soviet allied states led them to privatize their economies and formalize their relationships with NATO countries, the first step for many towards European integration and possible NATO membership.

During one of James Baker's 1990 talks with Soviet leader Mikhail Gorbachev, Baker did suggest that the German reunification negotiations could have resulted in an agreement whereby "there would be no extension of NATO's jurisdiction for forces of NATO one inch to the east," and historians like Mark Kramer have interpreted it as applying, at least in certain Soviet representatives' understanding, to all of Eastern Europe. Gorbachev later stated that NATO enlargement was "not discussed at all" in 1990, but, like Yeltsin, described the expansion of NATO past East Germany as "a violation of the spirit of the statements and assurances made to us in 1990."

This view, that informal assurances were given by diplomats from NATO members to the Soviet Union in 1990, is common in countries like Russia, and, according to political scientist Marc Trachtenberg, available evidence suggests that allegations made since by Russian leadership about the existence of such assurances "were by no means baseless." Yeltsin was succeeded in 2000 by Vladimir Putin, who further promoted the idea that guarantees about enlargement were made in 1990, including during a 2007 speech in Munich. This impression was later used by him as part of his justification for Russia's 2014 actions in Ukraine and the Russian invasion of Ukraine in 2022.

=== Visegrád Group ===
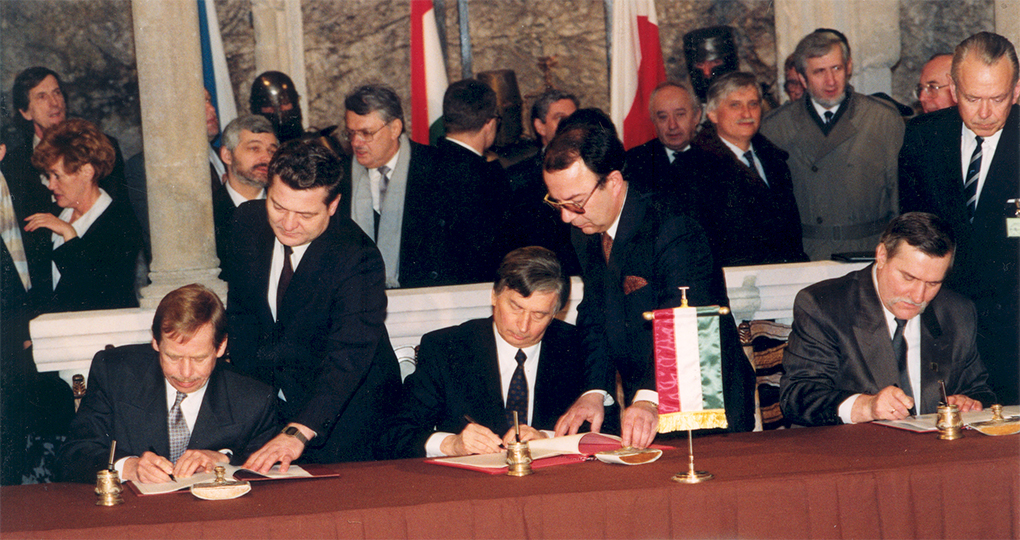
Václav Havel, József Antall, and Lech Wałęsa signed the treaty establishing the Visegrád Group in February 1991.

In February 1991, Poland, Hungary, and Czechoslovakia formed the Visegrád Group to push for European integration under the European Union and NATO, as well as to conduct military reforms in line with NATO standards. Internal NATO reaction to these former Warsaw Pact countries was initially negative, but by the 1991 Rome summit in November, members agreed to a series of goals that could lead to accession, such as market and democratic liberalization, and that NATO should be a partner in these efforts. Debate within the American government as to whether enlargement of NATO was feasible or desirable began during the George H.W. Bush administration. By mid-1992, a consensus emerged within the administration that NATO enlargement was a wise realpolitik measure to strengthen Euro-American hegemony. In the absence of NATO enlargement, Bush administration officials worried that the European Union might fill the security vacuum in Central Europe, and thus challenge American post-Cold War influence. There was further debate during the presidency of Bill Clinton between a rapid offer of full membership to several select countries versus a slower, more limited membership to a wide range of states over a longer time span. The Partnership for Peace has been described as a compromise between rapid and gradual NATO enlargement proposed at the time. The program, provided a structure for NATO to expand military and political cooperation with former Warsaw Pact member states, including Russia, while postponing immediate decisions on formal membership for any state. Victory by the Republican Party, which advocated for aggressive expansion, in the 1994 US congressional election helped sway US policy in favor of wider full-membership enlargement, which the US ultimately pursued in the following years. In 1996, Clinton called for former Warsaw Pact countries and post-Soviet republics to join NATO, and made NATO enlargement a part of his foreign policy.

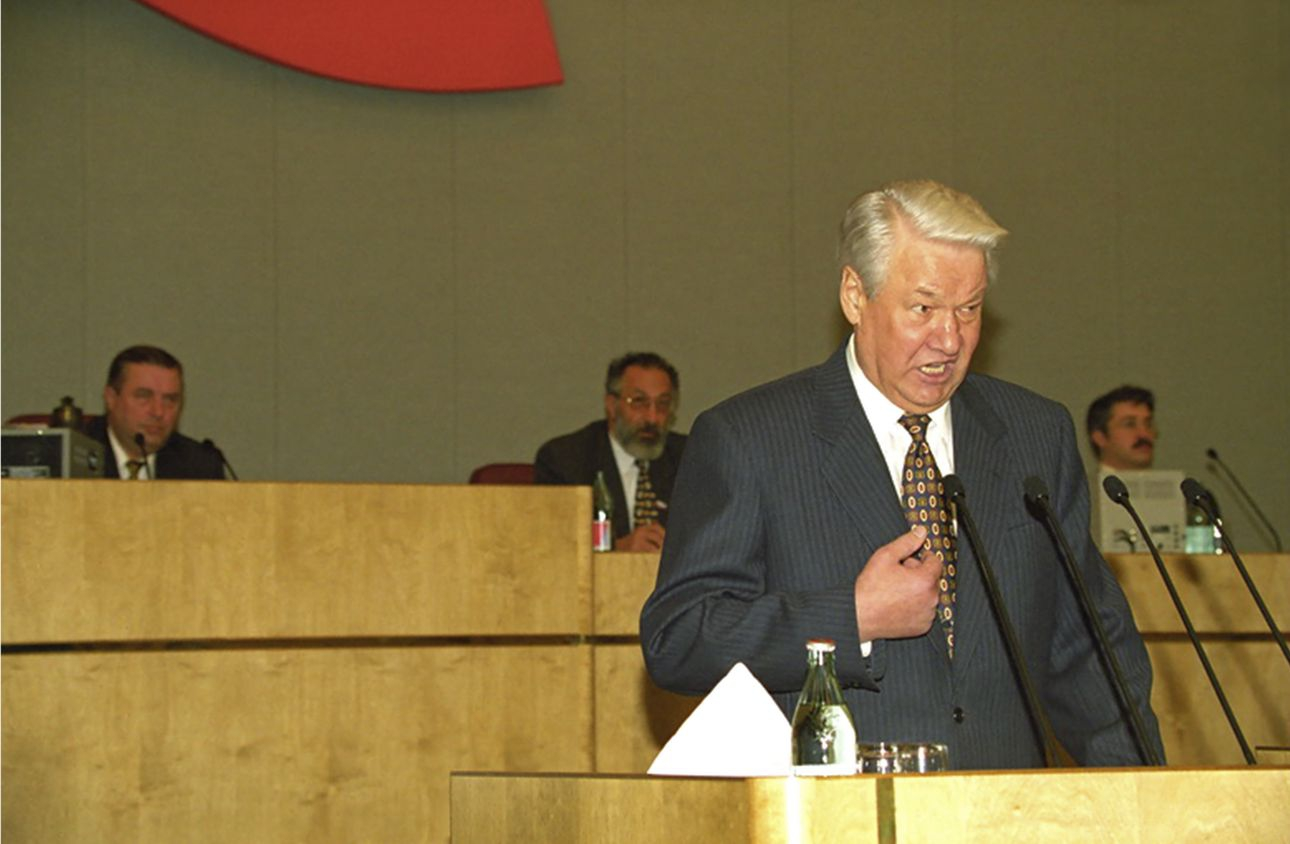
In December 1997, Russian President Boris Yeltsin described the eastern enlargement of NATO as a threat to Russia.

By August 1993, Polish President Lech Wałęsa was actively campaigning for his country to join NATO, at which time Yeltsin reportedly told him that Russia did not perceive Poland's membership as a threat. Yeltsin however retracted this the following month, writing that enlargement "would violate the spirit of the treaty on the final settlement", which "precludes the option of expanding the NATO zone into the East." In 1996, Russian Foreign Minister Andrei Kozyrev indicated his country's opposition to NATO enlargement. Russian President Boris Yeltsin signed the NATO-Russia Founding Act in May 1997, which affirms that "NATO and Russia do not consider each other as adversaries". The agreement states that "NATO has expanded and will continue to expand its political functions", and it refers to "new members". Though Yeltsin called NATO enlargement a mistake, he said "the negative consequences of NATO's enlargement will be reduced to the minimum through the NATO–Russia deal". Russia's December 1997 National Security Blueprint described NATO enlargement eastwards as "unacceptable" and a threat to Russian security.Russian officials argued that NATO expansion could bring alliance military infrastructure, including nuclear capabilities, closer to the Russian border, and isolate Kaliningrad. Russian military actions, including the First Chechen War, were among the factors driving Central and Eastern European countries, particularly those with memories of similar Soviet offensives, to push for NATO application and ensure their long-term security. Political parties reluctant to move on NATO membership were voted out of office, including the Bulgarian Socialist Party in 1997 and Slovak HZDS in 1998. Hungary's interest in joining was confirmed by a November 1997 referendum that returned 85.3% in favor of membership. During this period, wider forums for regional cooperation between NATO and its eastern neighbors were set up, including the North Atlantic Cooperation Council (later the Euro-Atlantic Partnership Council) and the Partnership for Peace.

While the other Visegrád members were invited to join NATO at its 1997 Madrid summit, Slovakia was excluded based on what several members considered undemocratic actions by nationalist Prime Minister Vladimír Mečiar. Romania and Slovenia were both considered for invitation in 1997, and each had the backing of a prominent NATO member, France and Italy respectively, but support for this enlargement was not unanimous between members, nor within individual governments, including in the US Congress. In an open letter to US President Clinton, more than forty foreign policy experts including Bill Bradley, Sam Nunn, Gary Hart, Paul Nitze, and Robert McNamara expressed their concerns about NATO enlargement as both expensive and unnecessary given the lack of a threat from Russia at that time. Hungary, Poland, and the Czech Republic officially joined NATO in March 1999.

=== Vilnius Group ===
In 1997, U.S. policy towards the Baltic States shifted towards active support for NATO membership, along with greater military participation and cooperation in Partnership for Peace exercises with the three states.

US President George W. Bush at the NATO Accession Ceremony for Bulgaria, Estonia, Latvia, Lithuania, Romania, Slovakia, and Slovenia

By the 1999 Washington summit NATO issued new guidelines for membership with individualized "Membership Action Plans" for Albania, Bulgaria, Estonia, Latvia, Lithuania, North Macedonia, Romania, Slovakia, and Slovenia in order to standardize the process for new members. In May 2000, these countries joined with Croatia to form the Vilnius Group in order to cooperate and lobby for common NATO membership, and by the 2002 Prague summit seven were invited for membership, which took place at the 2004 Istanbul summit. Slovenia had held a referendum on NATO the previous year, with 66% approving of membership.

Russia was particularly upset with the addition of the three Baltic states, the first countries that were part of the Soviet Union to join NATO. Russian troops had been stationed in Baltic states as late as 1995, and Russia had proposed alternative security, economic, and diplomatic arrangements in the late 90s, but the goals of European integration and NATO membership remained attractive for the Baltic states. Rapid investments in their own armed forces showed a seriousness in their desire for membership, and participation in NATO-led post-9/11 operations, particularly by Estonia in Afghanistan, won the three countries key support from individuals like US Senator John McCain, French President Jacques Chirac, and German Chancellor Gerhard Schröder. A 2006 study in the journal Security Studies argued that the NATO enlargements in 1999 and 2004 contributed to democratic consolidation in Central and Eastern Europe.

=== Adriatic Charter ===
Croatia also started a Membership Action Plan at the 2002 summit, but was not included in the 2004 enlargement. In May 2003, it joined with Albania and Macedonia to form the Adriatic Charter to support each other in their pursuit of membership. Croatia's prospect of membership sparked a national debate on whether a referendum on NATO membership needed to be held before joining the organization. Croatian Prime Minister Ivo Sanader ultimately agreed in January 2008, as part of forming a coalition government with the HSS and HSLS parties, not to officially propose one. Albania and Croatia were invited to join NATO at the 2008 Bucharest summit that April, though Slovenia threatened to hold up Croatian membership over their border dispute in the Bay of Piran. Slovenia did ratify Croatia's accession protocol in February 2009, before Croatia and Albania both officially joined NATO just before the 2009 Strasbourg–Kehl summit, with little opposition from Russia.

Montenegro declared independence on 3 June 2006; the new country subsequently joined the Partnership for Peace program at the 2006 Riga summit and then applied for a Membership Action Plan on 5 November 2008, which was granted in December 2009. Montenegro also began full membership with the Adriatic Charter of NATO aspirants in May 2009. NATO formally invited Montenegro to join the alliance on 2 December 2015, with negotiations concluding in May 2016; Montenegro joined NATO on 5 June 2017.

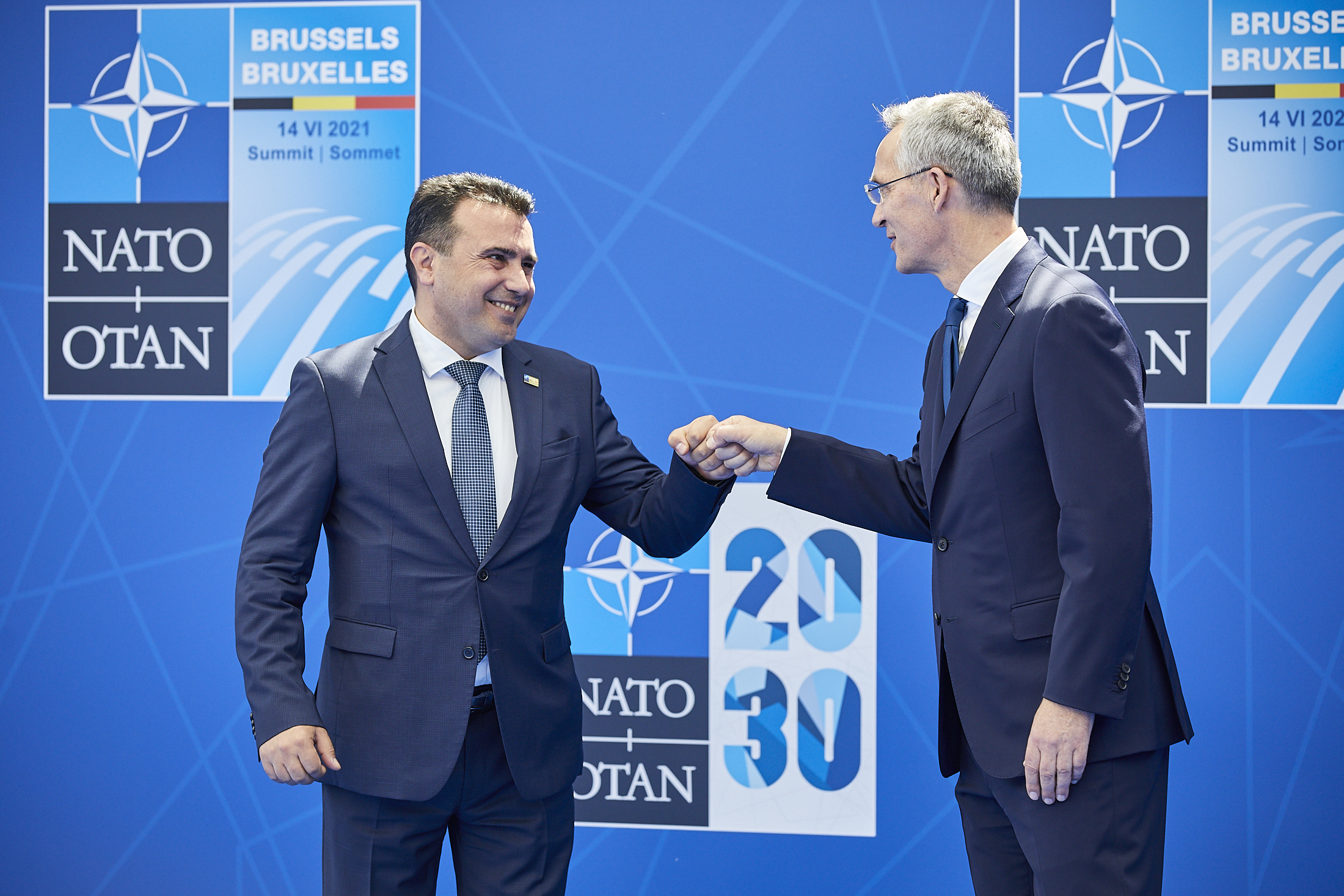
Prime Minister Zoran Zaev supported the 2018 Prespa Agreement, which allowed North Macedonia to complete accession to NATO.

Macedonia joined the Partnership for Peace in 1995, and commenced its Membership Action Plan in 1999, at the same time as Albania. At the 2008 Bucharest summit, Greece blocked a proposed invitation because it believed that the official name it was using at the time, "Republic of Macedonia," implied territorial aspirations toward its own region of Greek Macedonia. NATO nations agreed that the country would receive an invitation upon resolution of the Macedonia naming dispute. Macedonia sued Greece at the International Court of Justice (ICJ) over Greece's veto of Macedonia's NATO membership. Macedonia was part of the Vilnius Group, and had formed the Adriatic Charter with Croatia and Albania in 2003 to better coordinate NATO accession.

In June 2017, Macedonian Prime Minister Zoran Zaev signaled he would consider alternative names for the country in order to strike a compromise with Greece, settle the naming dispute and lift Greek objections to Macedonia joining the alliance. The naming dispute was resolved with the Prespa Agreement in June 2018 under which the country adopted the name North Macedonia, which was supported by a referendum in September 2018. NATO invited North Macedonia to begin membership talks on 11 July 2018; formal accession talks began on 18 October 2018. NATO's members signed North Macedonia's accession protocol on 6 February 2019. Most countries ratified the accession treaty in 2019, with Spain ratifying its accession protocol in March 2020. The Sobranie also ratified the treaty unanimously on 11 February 2020, before North Macedonia became a NATO member state on 27 March 2020.

=== Finland and Sweden ===
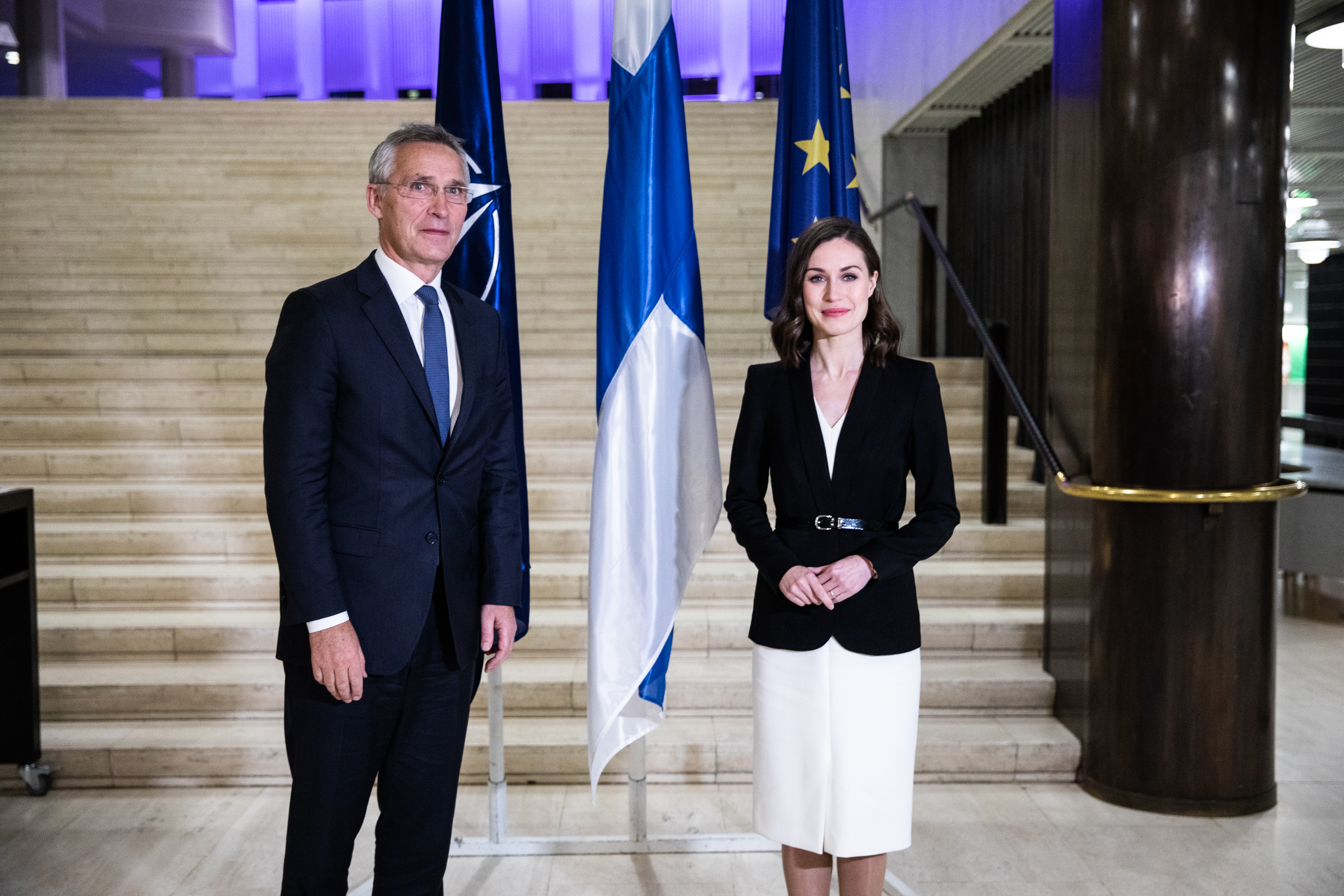
NATO Secretary General Jens Stoltenberg with Finnish Prime Minister Sanna Marin in Helsinki, 25 October 2021

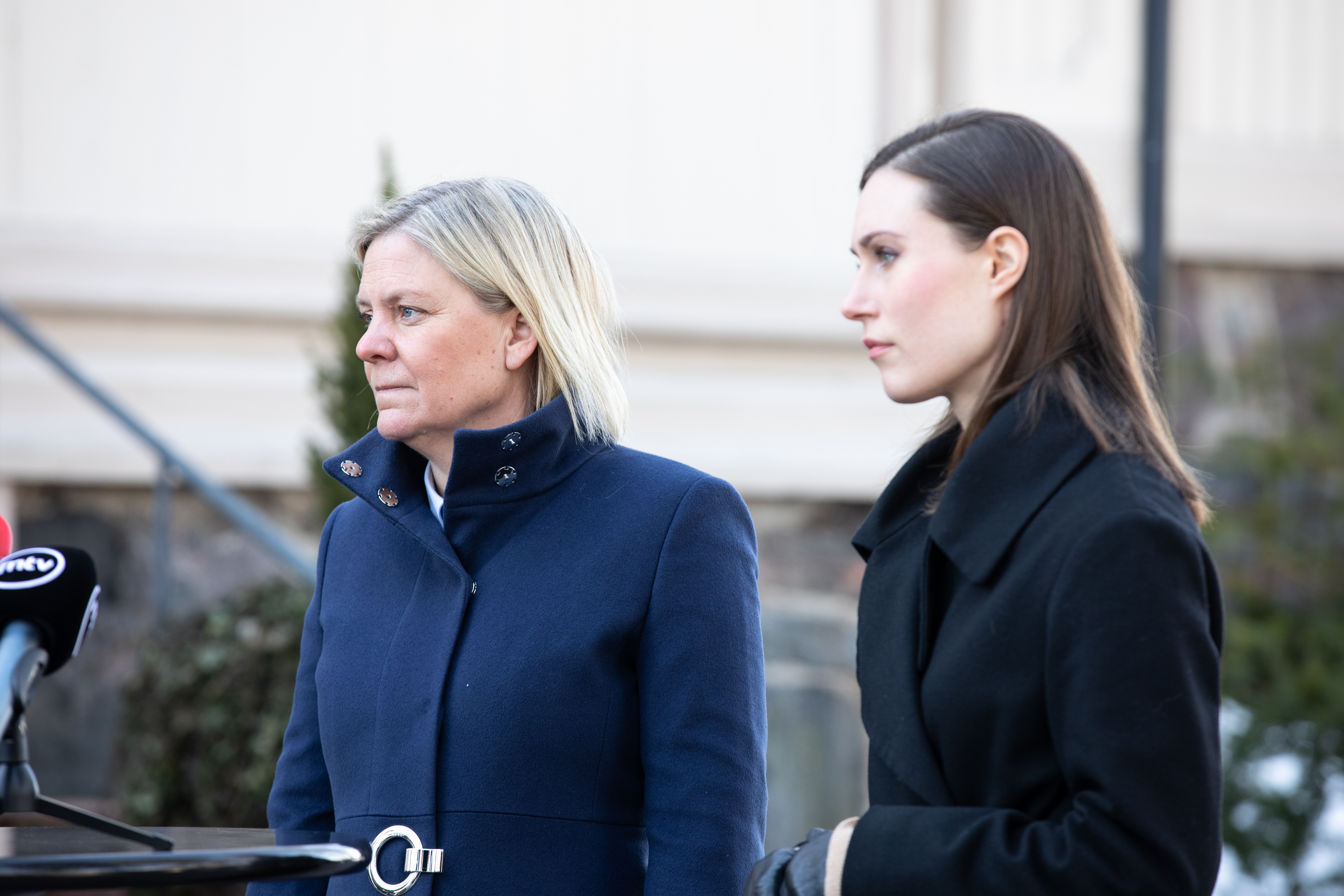
Swedish Prime Minister Magdalena Andersson held talks in March 2022 with her Finnish counterpart Sanna Marin about potential NATO memberships for both countries.

In 1949, Sweden chose not to join NATO and declared a security policy aiming for non-alignment in peace and neutrality in war. This position was maintained without much discussion during the Cold War. During this time, Finland's relationship with NATO and the Soviet Union followed the Paasikivi–Kekkonen doctrine, whereby the country joined neither the Western nor Eastern blocs. Following the dissolution of the Soviet Union in 1991, both countries joined NATO's Partnership for Peace in 1994 and provided peacekeeping forces to various NATO missions, including Kosovo (KFOR) and Afghanistan (ISAF) in the early 2000s.

Russia's annexation of Crimea from Ukraine in 2014 and subsequent full-scale invasion of Ukraine in 2022 led both countries to revisit their security and defence policies. Opinion polls in both countries shortly after the 2022 invasion for the first time showed clear majorities supported joining NATO. The major political parties in both also re-evaluated their positions on NATO membership, with many moving to either support membership or drop long-standing opposition. On 15 May 2022, Finland's Prime Minister Marin and President Niinistö together announced that Finland would apply for NATO membership, while Swedish Prime Minister Magdalena Andersson announced that Sweden would do the same the following day. Formal applications for membership were jointly submitted by both countries on 18 May 2022.

Turkey, however, opposed the start of accession negotiations for Finland and Sweden over multiple issues, most notably their claim that Finland and Sweden supported the Kurdish groups like the PKK, PYD, and YPG, which Turkey views as terrorists, and the followers of Fethullah Gülen, whom Turkey accused of orchestrating the unsuccessful 2016 Turkish coup d'état attempt. Accession negotiations only began following the signing of a tripartite memorandum between Finland, Sweden, and Turkey during the NATO summit in Madrid in June 2022. That memorandum allowed for formal invitations and for the ratification process to begin the following month, and by that October, only Hungary and Turkey had not approved the pair's applications.

Negotiations between the countries continued, and in February 2023, Turkish President Recep Tayyip Erdoğan announced that he now had a positive view of Finland's membership, but still a negative view of Sweden's. After the Hungarian and Turkish parliaments both approved Finland's application in March, Finland became a member of the alliance on 4 April 2023, the 74th anniversary of the North Atlantic Treaty being signed. Turkey and Sweden finally came to an understanding in early 2024, allowing Sweden to become the 32nd member of the alliance on 7 March 2024.

According to the Russian defence minister Sergei Shoigu, Finland's accession to NATO significantly increased the risk of a wider conflict in Europe. The move doubled the length of the border that the North Atlantic Treaty Organization shares with Russia. Russian President Vladimir Putin, however, has consistently dismissed Finland's and Sweden's accession to NATO, stating it poses "no threat to Russia".

=== Summary table and map ===
Date	Round	Country	A map of Europe with twelve colors that refer to the year different countries joined the alliance.
18 February 1952	First	Greece	A map of Europe with twelve colors that refer to the year different countries joined the alliance.
18 February 1952	First	Turkey	A map of Europe with twelve colors that refer to the year different countries joined the alliance.
9 May 1955	Second	West Germany	A map of Europe with twelve colors that refer to the year different countries joined the alliance.
30 May 1982	Third	Spain	A map of Europe with twelve colors that refer to the year different countries joined the alliance.
3 October 1990	—	German reunification	A map of Europe with twelve colors that refer to the year different countries joined the alliance.
12 March 1999	Fourth	Czech Republic	A map of Europe with twelve colors that refer to the year different countries joined the alliance.
12 March 1999	Fourth	Hungary	A map of Europe with twelve colors that refer to the year different countries joined the alliance.
12 March 1999	Fourth	Poland	A map of Europe with twelve colors that refer to the year different countries joined the alliance.
29 March 2004	Fifth	Bulgaria	A map of Europe with twelve colors that refer to the year different countries joined the alliance.
29 March 2004	Fifth	Estonia	A map of Europe with twelve colors that refer to the year different countries joined the alliance.
29 March 2004	Fifth	Latvia	A map of Europe with twelve colors that refer to the year different countries joined the alliance.
29 March 2004	Fifth	Lithuania	A map of Europe with twelve colors that refer to the year different countries joined the alliance.
29 March 2004	Fifth	Romania	A map of Europe with twelve colors that refer to the year different countries joined the alliance.
29 March 2004	Fifth	Slovakia	A map of Europe with twelve colors that refer to the year different countries joined the alliance.
29 March 2004	Fifth	Slovenia	A map of Europe with twelve colors that refer to the year different countries joined the alliance.
1 April 2009	Sixth	Albania	A map of Europe with twelve colors that refer to the year different countries joined the alliance.
1 April 2009	Sixth	Croatia	A map of Europe with twelve colors that refer to the year different countries joined the alliance.
5 June 2017	Seventh	Montenegro	A map of Europe with twelve colors that refer to the year different countries joined the alliance.
27 March 2020	Eighth	North Macedonia	A map of Europe with twelve colors that refer to the year different countries joined the alliance.
4 April 2023	Ninth	Finland	A map of Europe with twelve colors that refer to the year different countries joined the alliance.
7 March 2024	Tenth	Sweden	A map of Europe with twelve colors that refer to the year different countries joined the alliance.

== Criteria and process ==
=== Article 10 and the Open Door Policy ===
The North Atlantic Treaty is the basis of the organization, and, as such, any changes including new membership requires ratification by all current signers of the treaty. The treaty's Article 10 describes how non-member states may join NATO:

The Parties may, by unanimous agreement, invite any other European State in a position to further the principles of this Treaty and to contribute to the security of the North Atlantic area to accede to this Treaty. Any State so invited may become a Party to the Treaty by depositing its instrument of accession with the Government of the United States of America. The Government of the United States of America will inform each of the Parties of the deposit of each such instrument of accession.

Article 10 poses two general limits to non-member states. First, only European states are eligible for new membership, and second, these states not only need the approval of all the existing member states, but every member state can put some criteria forward that have to be attained. In practice, NATO formulates a common set of criteria. However, for instance, Greece blocked the Republic of Macedonia's accession to NATO for many years because it disagreed with the use of the name Macedonia. Turkey similarly opposes the participation of the Republic of Cyprus with NATO institutions as long as the Cyprus dispute is not resolved.

Since the 1991 Rome summit, when the delegations of its member states officially offered cooperation with Europe's newly democratic states, NATO has addressed and further defined the expectations and procedure for adding new members. The 1994 Brussels Declaration reaffirmed the principles in Article 10 and led to the "Study on NATO Enlargement". Published in September 1995, the study outlined the "how and why" of possible enlargement in Europe, highlighting three principles from the 1949 treaty for members to have: "democracy, individual liberty, and rule of law".

As NATO Secretary General Willy Claes noted, the 1995 study did not specify the "who or when", though it discussed how the then newly formed Partnership for Peace and North Atlantic Cooperation Council could assist in the enlargement process, and noted that on-going territorial disputes could be an issue for whether a country was invited. At the 1997 Madrid summit, the heads of state of NATO issued the "Madrid Declaration on Euro-Atlantic Security and Cooperation" which invited three Central European countries to join the alliance, out of the twelve that had at that point requested to join, laying out a path for others to follow. The text of Article 10 was the origin for the April 1999 statement of a "NATO open door policy".

In practice, diplomats and officials have stated that having no territorial disputes is a prerequisite to joining NATO, as a member with such a dispute would be automatically considered under attack by the occupying entity. However, West Germany joined NATO in 1955 despite having territorial disputes with East Germany and other states until the early 1970s.

=== Membership Action Plan ===
The biggest step in the formalization of the process for inviting new members came at the 1999 Washington summit when the Membership Action Plan (MAP) mechanism was approved as a stage for the current members to regularly review the formal applications of aspiring members. A country's participation in MAP entails the annual presentation of reports concerning its progress on five different measures:

- Willingness to settle international, ethnic or external territorial disputes by peaceful means, commitment to the rule of law and human rights, and democratic control of armed forces
- Ability to contribute to the organization's defense and missions
- Devotion of sufficient resources to armed forces to be able to meet the commitments of membership
- Security of sensitive information, and safeguards ensuring it
- Compatibility of domestic legislation with NATO cooperation

NATO provides feedback as well as technical advice to each country and evaluates its progress on an individual basis. Once members agree that a country meets the requirements, NATO can issue that country an invitation to begin accession talks. The final accession process, once invited, involves five steps leading up to the signing of the accession protocols and the acceptance and ratification of those protocols by the governments of the current NATO members.

In November 2002, NATO invited seven countries to join it via the MAP: Bulgaria, Estonia, Latvia, Lithuania, Romania, Slovakia and Slovenia. All seven invitees joined in March 2004, which was observed at a flag-raising ceremony on 2 April. After that date, NATO numbered 26 allies. Other former MAP participants were Albania and Croatia between May 2002 and April 2009, Montenegro between December 2009 and June 2017, and North Macedonia between April 1999 and March 2020, when it joined NATO. As of 2026, Bosnia and Herzegovina is the only country participating in a MAP.

=== Intensified dialogue ===
Intensified Dialogue was first introduced in April 2005 at an informal meeting of foreign ministers in Vilnius, Lithuania, as a response to Ukrainian aspirations for NATO membership and related reforms taking place under President Viktor Yushchenko, and which followed the November 22, 2002, signing of the NATO–Ukraine Action Plan under his predecessor, Leonid Kuchma. This formula, which includes discussion of a "full range of political, military, financial and security issues relating to possible NATO membership ... had its roots in the 1997 Madrid summit", where the participants had agreed "to continue the Alliance's intensified dialogs with those nations that aspire to NATO membership or that otherwise wish to pursue a dialog with NATO on membership questions".

In September 2006, Georgia became the second to be offered the Intensified Dialogue status, following a rapid change in foreign policy under President Mikhail Saakashvili and what it perceived as a demonstration of military readiness during the 2006 Kodori crisis. Montenegro, Bosnia and Herzegovina, and Serbia similarly received offers at the April 2008 Bucharest summit. While its neighbors both requested and accepted the dialog program, Serbia's offer was presented to guarantee the possibility of future ties with the alliance.

== Aspiring members ==
Members Membership Action Plan / Enhanced Opportunity Partner Individual Partnership Action Plan (IPAP) Partnership for Peace (Note: Membership Action Plan and Individual Partnership Action Plan countries are also Partnership for Peace members. States acceding to NATO replace Partnership for Peace membership with formal entry into the Alliance.)

As of January 2025, three states have formally expressed their desire to join NATO. Bosnia and Herzegovina is the only country with a Membership Action Plan, which together with Georgia, were named NATO "aspirant countries" at the North Atlantic Council meeting on 7 December 2011. During the 2008 NATO summit held in Bucharest and against the urging of United States President George W. Bush, Georgia's and Ukraine's proposed Membership Action Plans for integration into NATO were opposed by France's Nicolas Sarkozy and Germany's Angela Merkel. Ukraine was recognized as an aspirant country after the 2014 Ukrainian revolution, and formally applied for membership in 2022 following its invasion by Russia.

NATO aspirant countries
Country	Partnership for Peace	Individualized Action Plan	Intensified Dialogue	Membership Action Plan	Application	Accession protocol
Bosnia and Herzegovina	December 2006	IPAP September 2008	April 2008	December 2018 (Note: Originally invited to join the MAP in April 2010 under the condition that no Annual National Programme would be launched until one of the conditions for the OHR closure – the transfer of control of immovable defence property to the central Bosnian authorities from the two regional political entities – was fulfilled. Condition waived in 2018.)		
(Georgia (country)) Georgia	March 1994	IPAP October 2004	September 2006			
Ukraine	February 1994	Action Plan November 2002 (Note: NATO–Ukraine Action Plan adopted on 22 November 2002. This is not considered by NATO to be an IPAP.)	April 2005	—N/a (Note: NATO agreed that a MAP would not be required.)	30 September 2022	

=== Bosnia and Herzegovina ===
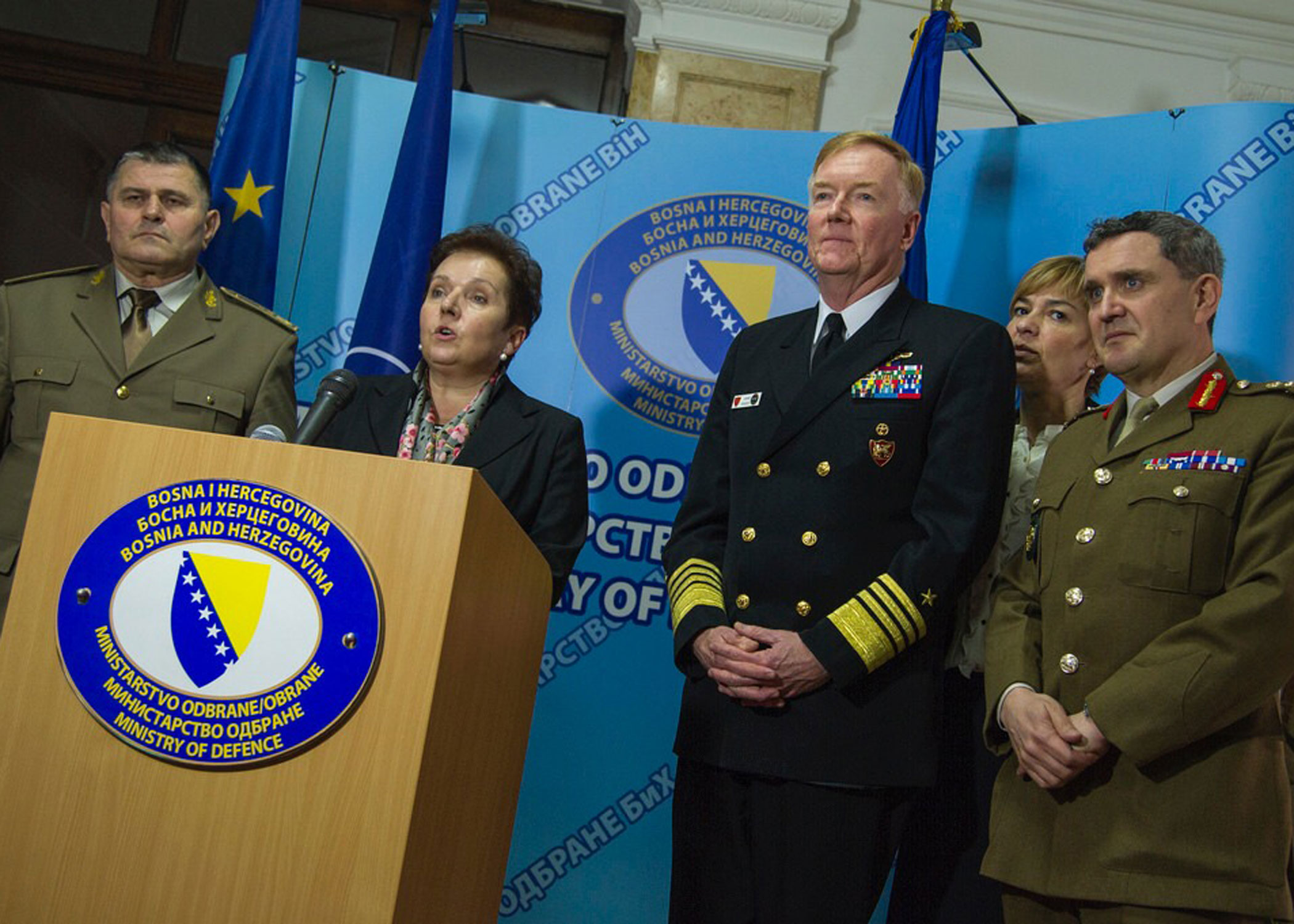
Marina Pendeš, Minister of Defence of Bosnia and Herzegovina, speaking at NATO's headquarters in Sarajevo in 2018

The 1995 NATO bombing of Bosnia and Herzegovina targeted the Bosnian Serb Army and together with international pressure led to the resolution of the Bosnian War and the signing of the Dayton Agreement in 1995. Since then, NATO has led the Implementation Force and Stabilization Force, and other peacekeeping efforts in the country. Bosnia and Herzegovina joined the Partnership for Peace in 2006, and signed an agreement on security cooperation in March 2007. Bosnia and Herzegovina began further cooperation with NATO within its Individual Partnership Action Plan in January 2008. The country then started the process of Intensified Dialogue at the 2008 Bucharest summit. The country was invited to join the Adriatic Charter of NATO aspirants in September 2008.

The Federation of Bosnia and Herzegovina within Bosnia and Herzegovina has expressed willingness to join NATO, however, it faces consistent political pressure from Republika Srpska, the other political entity in the country, alongside its partners in Russia. On 2 October 2009, Haris Silajdžić, the Bosniak Member of the Presidency, announced official application for Membership Action Plan. On 22 April 2010, NATO agreed to launch the Membership Action Plan for Bosnia and Herzegovina, but with certain conditions attached. Turkey is thought to be the biggest supporter of Bosnian membership, and heavily influenced the decision.

The conditions of the MAP, however, stipulated that no Annual National Programme could be launched until 63 military facilities are transferred from Bosnia's political divisions to the central government, which is one of the conditions for the OHR closure. The leadership of the Republika Srpska has opposed this transfer as a loss of autonomy. All movable property, including all weapons and other army equipment, is fully registered as the property of the country starting 1 January 2006. A ruling of the Constitutional Court of Bosnia and Herzegovina on 6 August 2017 decided that a disputed military facility in Han Pijesak is to be registered as property of Bosnia and Herzegovina. Despite the fact that all immovable property is not fully registered, NATO approved the activation of the Membership Action Plan for Bosnia and Herzegovina, and called on Bosnia to submit an Annual National Programme on 5 December 2018.

A February 2017 poll showed that 59% of the country supports NATO membership, but results were very divided depending on ethnic groups. While 84% of those who identified as Bosniak or Croat supported NATO membership, only 9% of those who identified as Serb did. Bosnian chances of joining NATO may depend on Serbia's attitude towards the alliance, since the leadership of Republika Srpska might be reluctant to go against Serbian interests. In October 2017, the National Assembly of the Republika Srpska passed a nonbinding resolution opposing NATO membership for Bosnia and Herzegovina. On 2 March 2022, Vjosa Osmani, the President of Kosovo, called on NATO to speed up the membership process for Kosovo and Bosnia and Herzegovina. Osmani also criticized Aleksandar Vučić, the President of Serbia, accusing him of using Milorad Dodik to "destroy the unity of Bosnia and Herzegovina".

=== Georgia ===
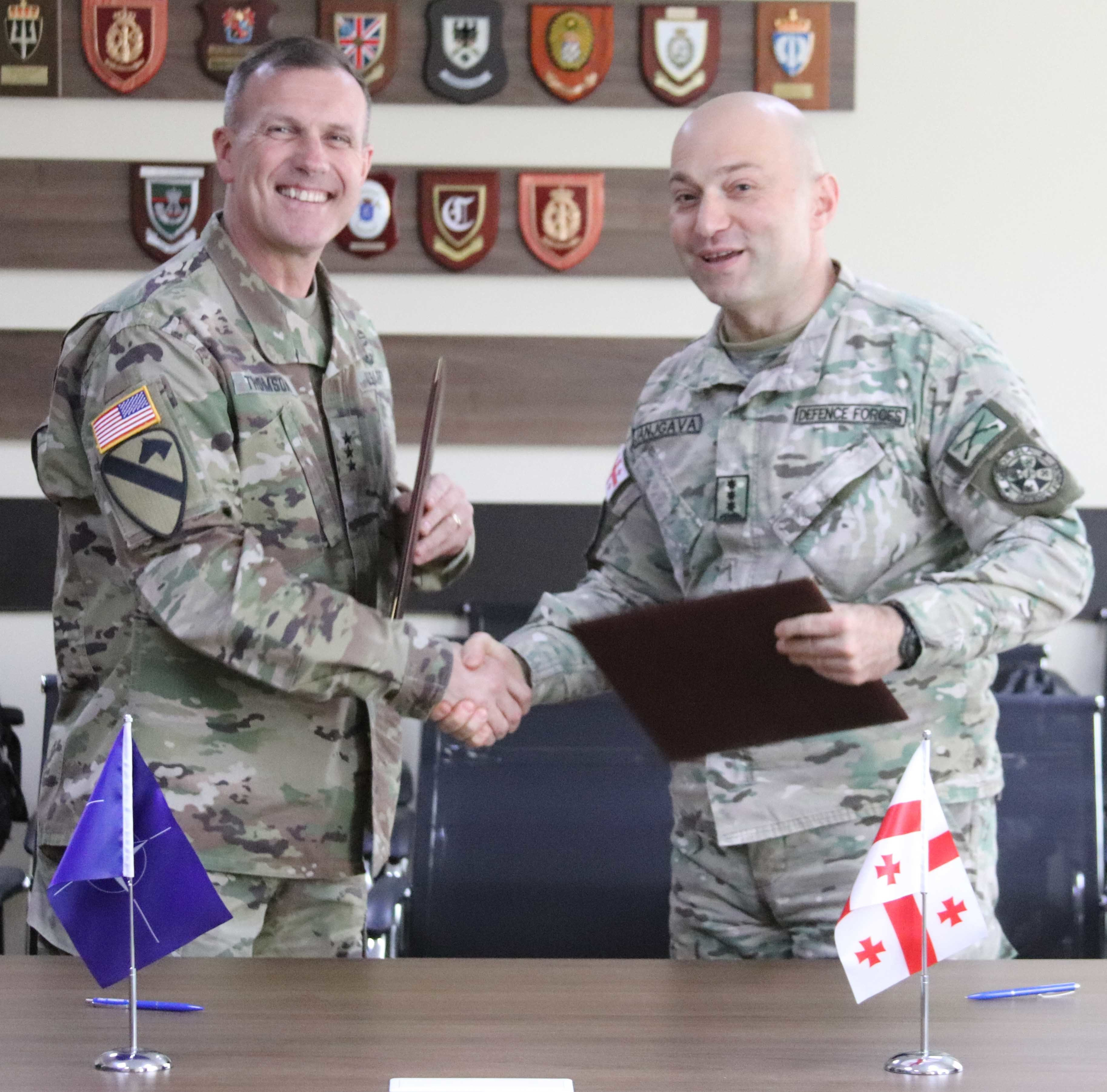
Representatives of NATO Allied Land Command and the Georgian Defense Forces after signing a letter of co-operation, 2019

Georgia moved quickly following the Rose Revolution in 2003 to seek closer ties with NATO (although the previous administration had also indicated that it desired NATO membership a year before the revolution took place). Georgia's northern neighbor, Russia, opposed the closer ties, including those expressed at the 2008 Bucharest summit, where NATO members promised that Georgia would eventually join the organization. Complications in the relationship between NATO and Georgia includes the presence of Russian military forces in internationally recognized Georgian territory as a result of multiple recent conflicts, like the 2008 Russo-Georgian War over the territories of Abkhazia and South Ossetia, both of which are home to a large number of citizens of Russia. On 3 December 2008, NATO's 26 foreign ministers voted to reject a Membership Action Plan (MAP) to Georgia, arguing that it would antagonize Russia and that Georgia needed to enact more reforms. On 21 November 2011, Russian President Dmitry Medvedev while addressing soldiers in Vladikavkaz near the Georgian border stated that Russia's 2008 invasion had prevented any further NATO enlargement into the former Soviet sphere.

A nonbinding referendum in 2008 resulted in 77 percent of voters supporting NATO accession. In May 2013, Georgian Prime Minister Bidzina Ivanishvili stated that his goal was to get a Membership Action Plan (MAP) for his country from NATO in 2014. In June 2014, diplomats from NATO suggested that while a MAP was unlikely, a package of "reinforced cooperation" agreements was a possible compromise. Anders Fogh Rasmussen confirmed that this could include the building of military capabilities and armed forces training.

In September 2019, Russian Foreign Minister Sergey Lavrov said that "NATO approaching our borders is a threat to Russia." He was quoted as saying that if NATO accepts Georgian membership with the article on collective defense covering only Tbilisi-administered territory (i.e., excluding the Georgian territories of Abkhazia and South Ossetia, both of which are currently an unrecognized breakaway republics supported by Russia), "we will not start a war, but such conduct will undermine our relations with NATO and with countries who are eager to enter the alliance."

On 29 September 2020, NATO Secretary General Jens Stoltenberg called on Georgia to use every opportunity to move closer to the Alliance and speed up preparations for membership. Stoltenberg stressed that earlier that year, the Allies agreed to further strengthen the NATO-Georgia partnership, and that NATO welcomed the progress made by Georgia in carrying out reforms, modernizing its armed forces and strengthening democracy. Georgian President Salome Zourabichvili, who took office in 2018, has conceded that NATO membership might not be possible while Russia occupies Georgian territory, and has sought to focus on European Union membership, for which Georgia submitted its application in May 2022.

=== Ukraine ===
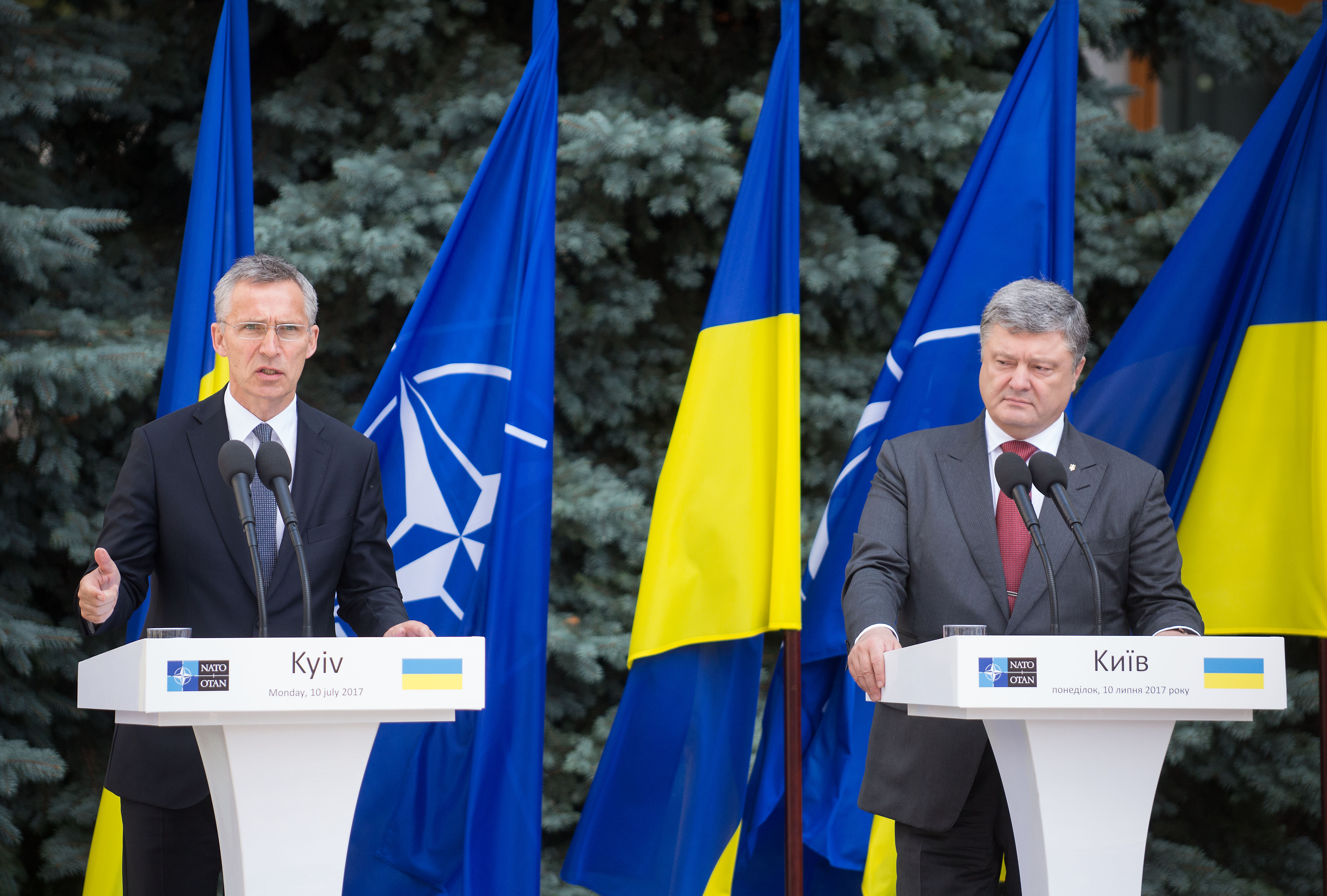
NATO Secretary General Jens Stoltenberg with Ukrainian president Petro Poroshenko, July 2017

Ukraine's relationship with NATO has been politically divisive, and is part of a larger debate over Ukraine's ties to both the European Union and Russia. Ukraine established ties to the alliance with a NATO–Ukraine Action Plan in November 2002, joined NATO's Partnership for Peace in February 2005, then entered into the Intensified Dialogue program with NATO in April 2005.

The position of Russian leaders on Ukraine–NATO relations has changed over time. In 2002, Russia's president Vladimir Putin declared no objections to Ukraine's growing relations with the alliance, saying it was a matter for Ukraine and NATO. In 2005, Putin said that if Ukraine joined NATO, "we will respect their choice, because it is their sovereign right to decide their own defence policy, and this will not worsen relations between our countries". Ahead of the 2008 Bucharest summit, Ukraine applied for a Membership Action Plan (MAP), the first step in joining NATO. At the summit, Putin called Ukrainian membership "a direct threat". NATO Secretary General Jaap de Hoop Scheffer declared that Ukraine would someday join, but would not yet be offered a Membership Action Plan.

When Viktor Yanukovych became Ukraine's president in 2010, he said that Ukraine would remain a "European, non-aligned state", and remain a member of NATO's outreach program. In June 2010 the Ukrainian parliament voted to drop the goal of NATO membership, in a bill drafted by Yanukovych. This affirmed Ukraine's neutral status and forbade its membership in any military bloc, but allowed for co-operation.

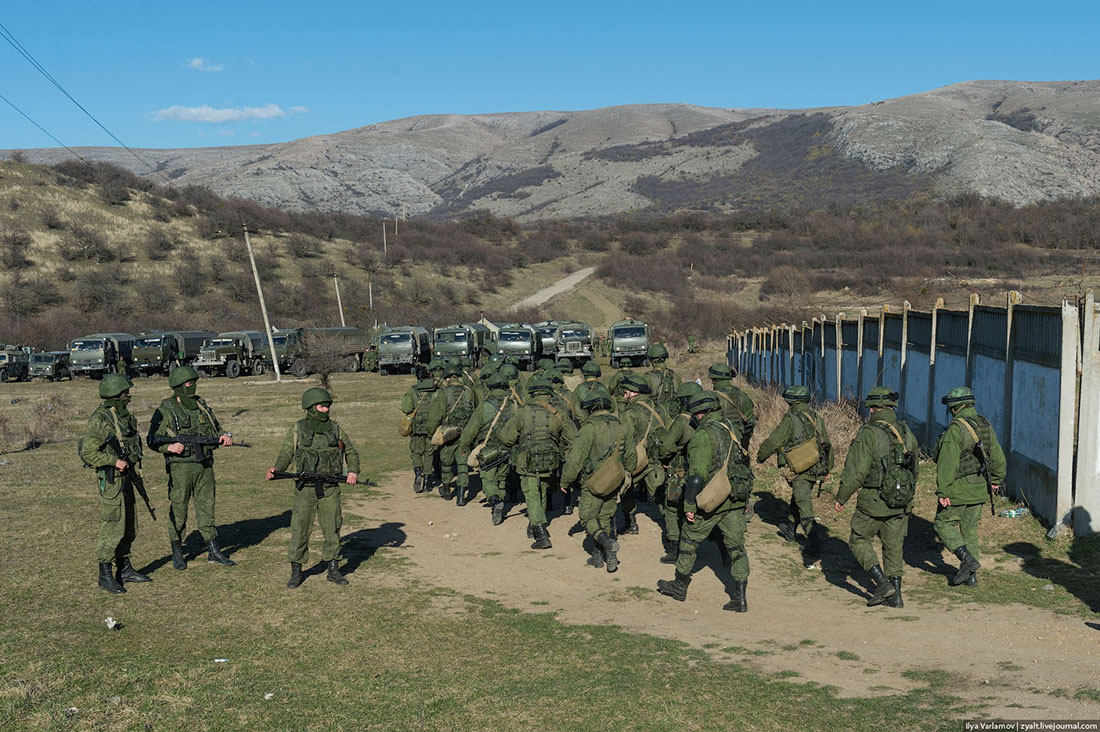
Unmarked Russian troops during the Russian annexation of Crimea. Russian attacks on Ukraine in 2014 caused Ukraine to renew its bid for NATO membership.

In the February 2014 Ukrainian Revolution, Ukraine's parliament voted to remove Yanukovych. Soon after, while Ukraine was still a neutral country, Russia occupied and annexed Crimea. The following month, new Prime Minister Arseniy Yatsenyuk said Ukraine was not seeking NATO membership. In August 2014, the Russian military invaded eastern Ukraine to support its separatist proxies. Because of this, Yatsenyuk announced the resumption of the NATO membership bid, and in December 2014, Ukraine's parliament voted to drop non-aligned status. NATO Secretary General Anders Fogh Rasmussen said membership was still an option. Support for membership rose to 64 percent in government-held Ukraine according to a July 2015 poll, and polls showed that the rise in support for NATO was linked to Russia's ongoing military intervention.

In 2017, as Russian-backed forces continued to occupy parts of the country, Ukraine's parliament voted to make NATO integration a foreign policy priority, and President Petro Poroshenko announced he would negotiate a Membership Action Plan. Ukraine was acknowledged as an aspiring member by March 2018. In September 2018, Ukraine's parliament voted to include the goal of NATO membership in the constitution.

During 2021, there were massive Russian military build-ups near Ukraine's borders. In April 2021, President Volodymyr Zelenskyy said that NATO membership is the only way to end Russian aggression in eastern Ukraine. Russia sent an ultimatum to NATO, demanding that Ukraine and other former Soviet states be barred from ever joining. Secretary General Jens Stoltenberg replied that this was a matter between Ukraine and NATO, adding that "Russia has no right to establish a sphere of influence to try to control their neighbors".

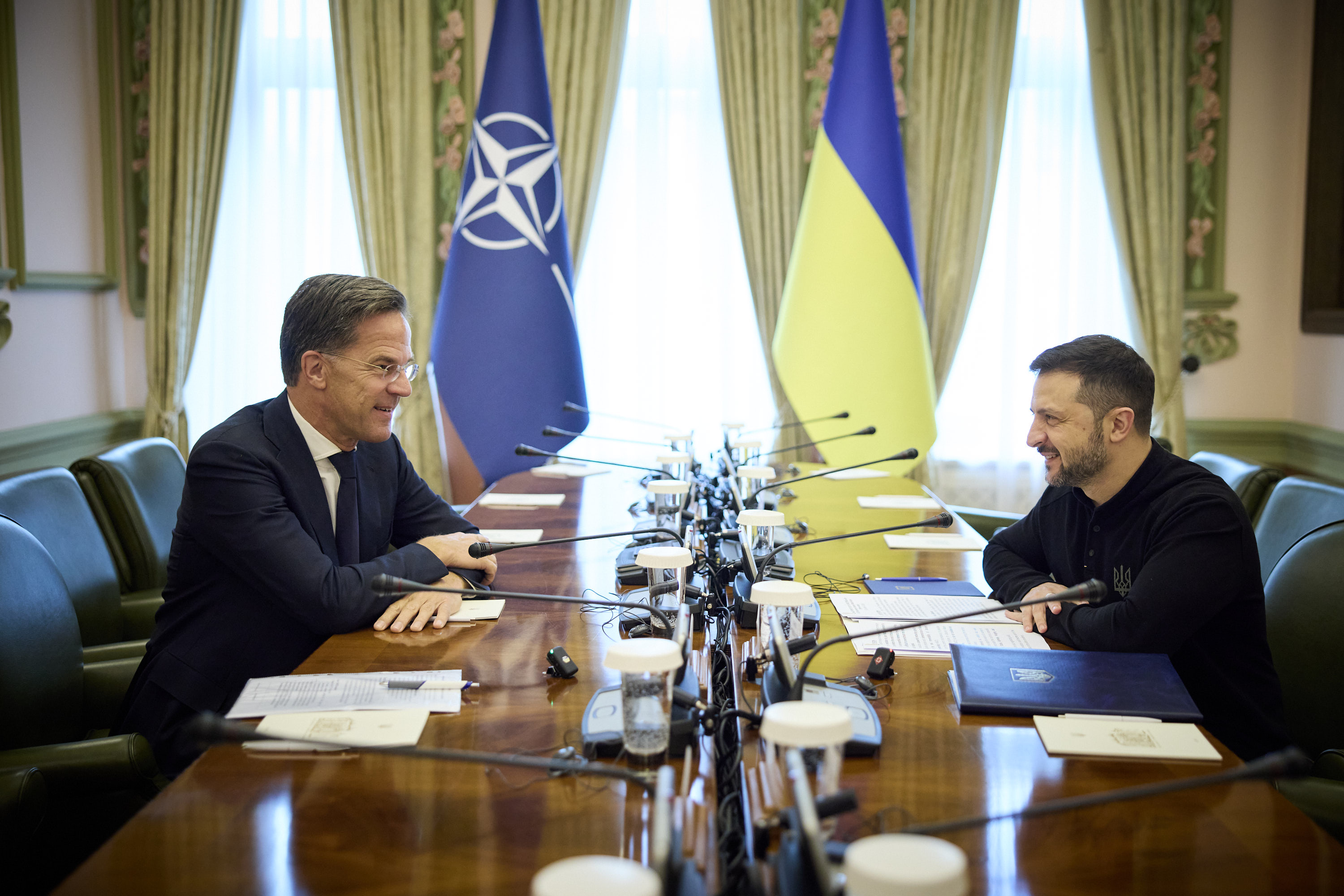
NATO Secretary General Mark Rutte with Ukrainian President Volodymyr Zelenskyy in Kyiv, 3 October 2024

Russia invaded Ukraine in February 2022. In his speech announcing the invasion, Putin falsely claimed that NATO military infrastructure was being built up inside Ukraine, threatening Russia. Russia's invasion drove Finland and Sweden to apply for NATO membership. Putin said their membership was not a problem for Russia, but Ukraine's membership was a "completely different thing" because of "territorial disputes". Peter Dickinson of the Atlantic Council wrote that Putin's "dislike of NATO enlargement is real enough, but it has nothing to do with legitimate national security concerns. Instead, Putin objects to NATO because it prevents him from bullying Russia's neighbours".

Since the invasion, calls for Ukrainian NATO membership have grown. On 30 September 2022, Ukraine submitted an application for NATO membership, after Russia proclaimed it had annexed the southeast. According to Politico, NATO members are reluctant to discuss Ukraine's entry because of Putin's "hypersensitivity" on the issue. At the 2023 Vilnius NATO summit it was decided that Ukraine would no longer be required to participate in a Membership Action Plan before joining the alliance.

== Membership debates ==
The Soviet Union was the primary ideological adversary for NATO during the Cold War. Following its dissolution, several states which had maintained neutrality during the Cold War or were post-Soviet states increased their ties with Western institutions; a number of them requested to join NATO. The 2022 Russian invasion of Ukraine reignited debate surrounding NATO membership in several countries.

Austria, Ireland, Switzerland, and Malta have maintained their Cold War–era neutrality. All are now members of the Partnership for Peace, and all except Switzerland are now members of the European Union. The defence ministry of Switzerland, which has a long-standing policy of neutrality, initiated a report in May 2022 analyzing various military options, including increased cooperation and joint military exercises with NATO. That month, a poll indicated 33% of Swiss supported NATO membership for Switzerland, and 56% supported increased ties with NATO. Cyprus is also a member state of the European Union, but it is the only one that is neither a full member state nor participates in the Partnership for Peace. Any treaty concerning Cyprus' participation in NATO would likely be blocked by Turkey because of the Cyprus dispute.

Russia, Armenia, Belarus, and Kazakhstan are all members of the Collective Security Treaty Organization (CSTO), a post-Soviet alternative military alliance. Azerbaijan was a member of the CSTO but has committed to a policy of neutrality since 1999. In 2000, Russian President Vladimir Putin floated the idea of Russia potentially joining NATO. However these prospects went nowhere, and Putin began developing anti-NATO sentiment and espousing hostile views towards NATO from the early 2000s. In 2009, Russian envoy Dmitry Rogozin did not rule out joining NATO at some point, but stated that Russia was currently more interested in leading a coalition as a great power.

=== Armenia ===
Armenia regained its independence from the Soviet Union in 1991. Since then, Armenia has pursued developing closer Euro-Atlantic ties with the member states of NATO. Armenia joined the North Atlantic Cooperation Council in 1992, which was succeeded in 1997 by the Euro-Atlantic Partnership Council (EAPC). The EAPC brings together NATO allies and partner countries from the Euro-Atlantic area. On 5 October 1994, Armenia became a member of the Partnership for Peace programme. However, several politicians and political parties have called on the Government of Armenia to withdraw Armenia's membership in the Collective Security Treaty Organization and either seek full membership in NATO or become a major non-NATO ally (MNNA). For example, the European Party of Armenia, the For The Republic Party, and the Christian-Democratic Rebirth Party have campaigned in favor of Armenia's membership in NATO, while the Armenian National Movement Party and the National Democratic Pole have called for developing deeper relations with NATO.

After the start of renewed fighting between Armenia and Azerbaijan on 13 September 2022, Armenia triggered the mutual defence Article 4 of the CSTO treaty. However, the CSTO mission sent to monitor the situation along the border took a rather uncommitted position in the conflict, leading to increased criticism towards CSTO membership inside Armenian political circles, with the secretary of the Security Council of Armenia, Armen Grigoryan even stating that he saw no more hope for the CSTO. The lack of Russian support during the conflict prompted a national debate in Armenia, as an increasing percentage of the population put into doubt whether it is beneficial to continue CSTO membership, calling for realignment of the state with NATO instead. This coincided with a visit from Speaker of the United States House of Representatives Nancy Pelosi to Yerevan on 17 September 2022, largely seen as an effort to reorient the security alliance structure of Armenia. The Helsinki Citizens' Assembly presented a document of recommendations to Nancy Pelosi during her visit to Yerevan. One of the recommendations was to provide MNNA status to Armenia.

On 23 November 2022, opposition protestors gathered in Yerevan, led by the anti-Russian National Democratic Pole Alliance. Protestors called for the withdrawal of Armenia from the CSTO and for the country to develop closer relations with the United States and the West.

Some US politicians like Sam Brownback have also campaigned for Armenia to be granted MNNA status. On 21 June 2023, Brownback stated, "Armenia is a natural long-term ally of the United States. Armenia must be given Major Non-NATO Ally Status of the US".

On 3 September 2023, during an interview, Armenian prime minister Nikol Pashinyan stated that it was a strategic mistake for Armenia to solely rely on Russia to guarantee its security. Pashinyan stated, "Moscow has been unable to deliver and is in the process of winding down its role in the wider South Caucasus region" and "the Russian Federation cannot meet Armenia's security needs. This example should demonstrate to us that dependence on just one partner in security matters is a strategic mistake". Pashinyan accused Russian peacekeepers deployed to uphold the ceasefire deal of failing to do their job. Pashinyan confirmed that Armenia is trying to diversify its security arrangements, most notably with the European Union and the United States.

On 23 February 2024, Armenian Prime Minister Nikol Pashinyan stated that Armenia has frozen its participation in the CSTO. Pashinyan said "We have now in practical terms frozen our participation in this treaty" and "membership of the CSTO was under review" during a live broadcast interview. On 28 February 2024, during a speech made in the National Assembly, Pashinyan further stated that the CSTO is "a threat to the national security of Armenia". On 12 March, Pashinyan said that the CSTO needed to clarify "what constitutes Armenia's sovereign territory", as the organization had not come to Armenia's defence when requested following Azerbaijani troops crossing the border into Armenia's internationally recognized territory. Pashinyan said that if the CSTO's response did not align with Armenia's expectations, the country would officially withdraw from the organization. On 12 June 2024, Armenia announced that it would formally withdraw from the alliance at an unspecified later date, with Pashinyan stating, "We will leave. We will decide when to exit ... Don't worry, we won't return".

In May 2024, the United Platform of Democratic Forces called on the government of Armenia to apply for EU and NATO membership. On 12 February 2025 the Armenian parliament unanimously approved a bill to initiate Armenia's accession process to the European Union. The Armenian government has announced that it aims to join the European Union, but does not intend to join NATO.

=== Austria ===
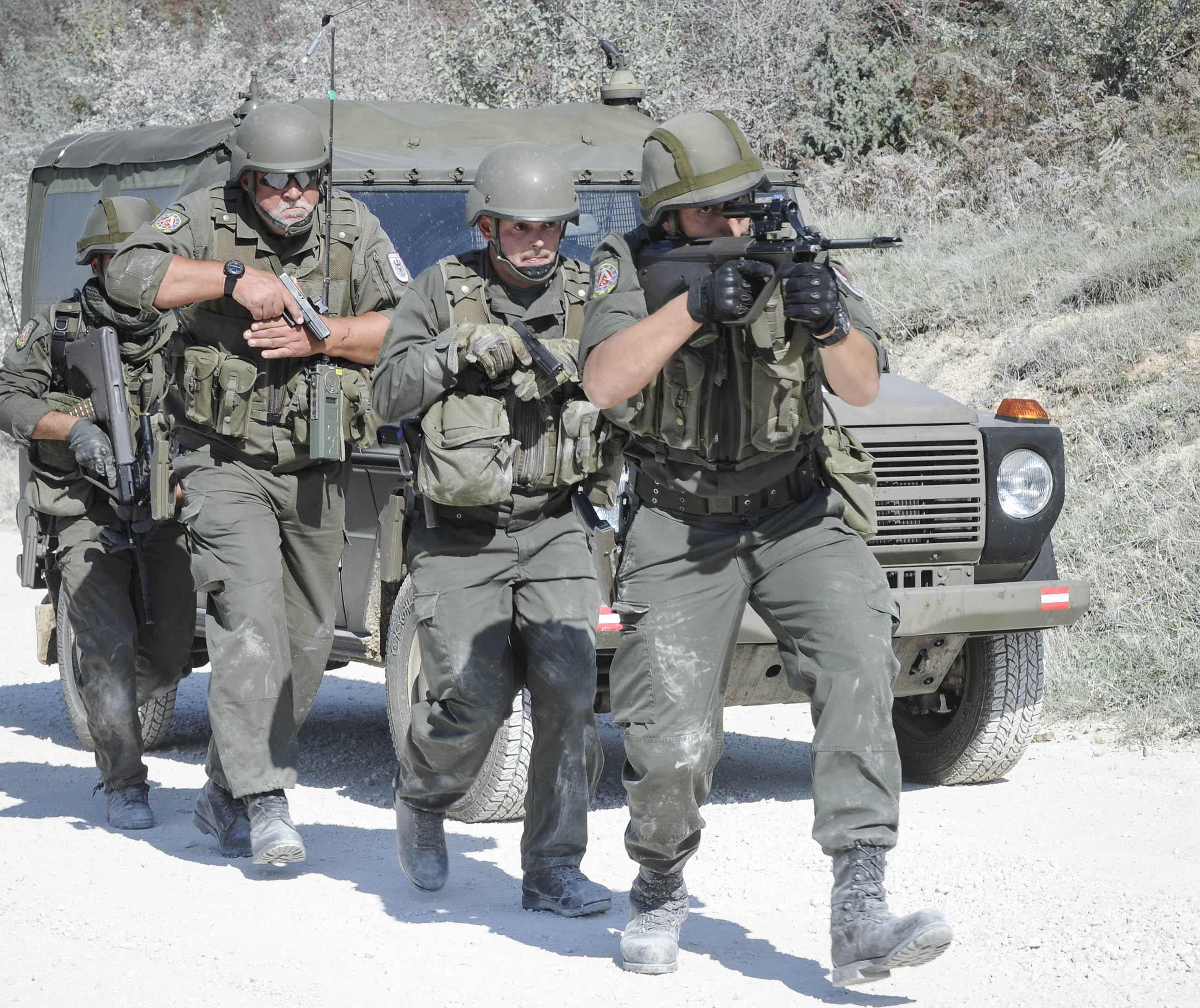
Austria's neutrality is enshrined in law and treaty, but it participates in peacekeeping missions like Operation Althea in Bosnia and Herzegovina.

Austria was occupied by the four victorious Allied powers following World War II under the Allied Control Council, similar to Germany. During negotiations to end the occupation, which were ongoing at the same time as Germany's, the Soviet Union insisted that the reunified country adopt the model of Swiss neutrality. The US feared that this would encourage West Germany to accept similar Soviet proposals for neutrality as a condition for German reunification. Shortly after West Germany's accession to NATO, the parties agreed to the Austrian State Treaty in May 1955, which was largely based on the Moscow Memorandum signed the previous month between Austria and the Soviet Union. While the treaty itself did not commit Austria to neutrality, this was subsequently enshrined into Austria's constitution that October with the Declaration of Neutrality. The Declaration prohibits Austria from joining a military alliance, from hosting foreign military bases within its borders, and from participating in a war.

Membership of Austria in the European Union (or its predecessor organizations) was controversial because of the Austrian commitment to neutrality. Austria only joined in 1995, together with Sweden and Finland, which had also declared their neutrality in the Cold War. Austria joined NATO's Partnership for Peace in 1995, and participates in NATO's Euro-Atlantic Partnership Council. The Austrian military also participates in the United Nations peacekeeping operations and has deployments in several countries as of 2022, including Kosovo, Lebanon, and Bosnia and Herzegovina, where it has led the EUFOR mission there since 2009. Individual politicians from the Austrian People's Party (ÖVP) have supported NATO membership as part of European integration, including the Chancellor from 2000 to 2007, Wolfgang Schüssel and his defense minister, Werner Fasslabend.

The 2022 Russian invasion of Ukraine, and subsequent NATO membership of Finland and Sweden, did lead to additional calls to re-open the issue of neutrality, including from Andreas Khol, the 2016 ÖVP presidential nominee. However, only the NEOS party, which then held 15 of the 183 seats in the National Council, supported a May 2022 open letter asking the government to review its commitment to neutrality, and Chancellor Karl Nehammer, of the ÖVP, has rejected the idea. Membership is not widely popular with the Austrian public. A March 2023 survey found 21% in favor, with 61% against, a small increase of both 7% in favor and 7% unsure, compared to the last survey 10 months prior.

=== Cyprus ===
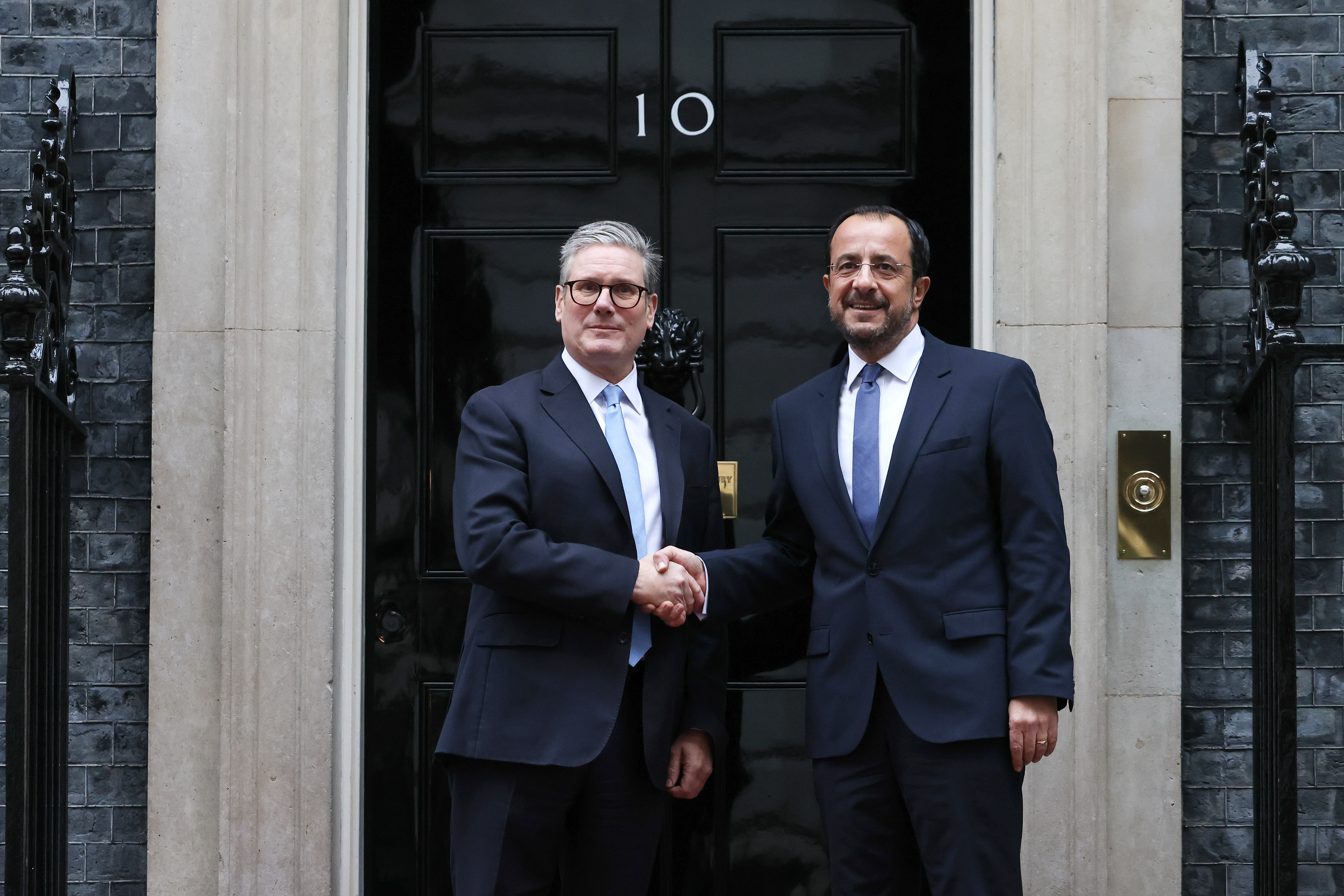
Nikos Christodoulides, President of Cyprus, meeting in 2024 with his counterpart, Keir Starmer, of the United Kingdom, which controls two military bases on the island.

Prior to gaining its independence in 1960, Cyprus was a crown colony of the United Kingdom and as such the UK's NATO membership also applied to British Cyprus. The Sovereign Base Areas of Akrotiri and Dhekelia in Cyprus remained under British control as a British Overseas Territory following independence. Neighbouring Greece and Turkey competed for influence in the newly independent Cyprus, with intercommunal rivalries and movements for union with Greece or partition and partial union with Turkey. The first President of the independent Republic of Cyprus (1960–1977), Archbishop of Cyprus Makarios III, adopted a policy of non-alignment and took part in the 1961 founding meeting of the Non-Aligned Movement in Belgrade.

The 1974 Turkish invasion of Cyprus and ongoing dispute, in which Turkey continues to occupy Northern Cyprus, complicates Cyprus' relations with NATO. Any treaty concerning Cyprus' participation in NATO, either as a full member, PfP or Euro-Atlantic Partnership Council, would likely be vetoed by Turkey, a full member of NATO, until the dispute is resolved. NATO membership for a reunified Cyprus has been proposed as a solution to the question of security guarantees, given that all three of the current guarantors under the Treaty of Guarantee (1960) (Greece, Turkey and the United Kingdom) are already NATO members.

The Parliament of Cyprus voted in February 2011 to apply for membership in the PfP program, but President Demetris Christofias vetoed the decision, arguing that it would hamper his attempts to negotiate an end to the Cyprus dispute and demilitarize the island. Nicos Anastasiades, who was elected President in 2013, stated that he intended to apply for membership in the PfP program soon after taking over. His foreign minister Nikos Christodoulides later dismissed Cypriot membership of NATO or Partnership for Peace, preferring to keep Cyprus' foreign and defence affairs within the framework of the EU, i.e. the Common Security and Defence Policy (CSDP). In May 2022, defence minister Charalambos Petrides confirmed that the country would not apply to NATO despite the Russian invasion of Ukraine.

After the 2023 presidential election, Anastasiades' foreign minister Christodoulides succeeded him as President. In November 2024, Christodoulides reversed his previous stance and revealed a plan to deepen Cyprus' relations with NATO and eventually join as a full member. Under the first phase of the plan, Cyprus would seek to join preparatory organisations linked to NATO, which would require progress in resolving the Cyprus dispute with NATO member Turkey and improvements to EU–Turkey relations. Practical steps of the plan include securing a longer-term exemption from the U.S. arms embargo, expanding joint military training opportunities for the Cypriot National Guard at U.S. military academies, and modernisation of Cyprus' defence infrastructure to meet NATO standards. Christodoulides stated that "the U.S. response has been very positive" and that these steps "will ensure that, once all conditions are met, Cyprus can join NATO".

=== Ireland ===
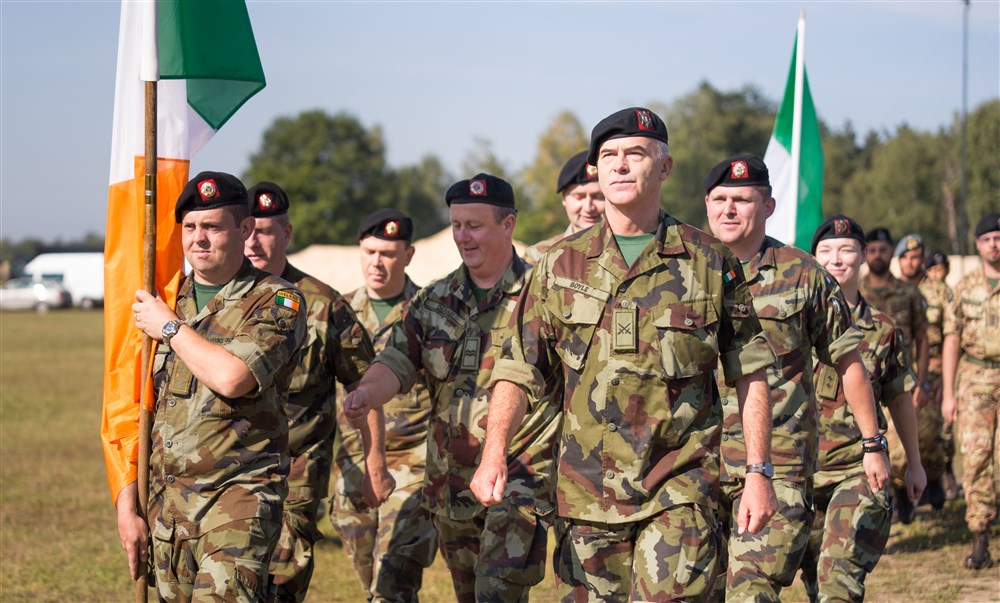
Ireland currently does not seek to join NATO, but does work to improve the Defence Forces' interoperability with NATO.

Ireland was neutral during World War II, though the country cooperated with Allied intelligence and permitted the Allies use of Irish airways and ports. Ireland continued its policy of military neutrality during the Cold War, and before soldiers in the Irish military, the Defence Forces, can be sent abroad, Irish law requires approval from the government, the Dáil Éireann, and the United Nations, which has been referred to as a "triple lock" on Irish neutrality since the early 2000s. Ireland supplied a small number of troops to the NATO-led International Security Assistance Force (ISAF) in Afghanistan (2001–2014) and supports the ongoing NATO-led Kosovo Force (KFOR).

Ireland joined NATO's Partnership for Peace (PfP) program and Euro-Atlantic Partnership Council (EAPC) in 1999, and participates in the alliance's PfP Planning and Review Process (PARP). This aims to increase the interoperability of the Defence Forces with NATO member states and bring them into line with accepted international standards so as to successfully deploy with other professional military forces on peacekeeping operations overseas. The country most recently renewed their agreement with NATO regarding interoperability in February 2024, with the issues of cybersecurity and the security of underseas communication cables in Irish waters being added as additional areas of cooperation.

While there are a number of individual politicians who support Ireland joining NATO, mainly within the center-right Fine Gael party, no major political party in Ireland currently supports full accession to NATO, a reflection on public opinion in the country. Though its stance was softened during the 2024 election campaign, the republican party Sinn Féin has long supported both withdrawal from PfP and passage of a constitutional amendment to prohibit the country from joining a military alliance like NATO. The Dáil Éireann has considered and defeated such an amendment in April 2019 and in November 2023. While Taoiseach Micheál Martin said in 2022 that Ireland would not need to hold a referendum in order to join NATO, Irish constitutional lawyers have pointed to the precedent set by the 1987 case Crotty v. An Taoiseach as suggesting it would be necessary, and that any attempt to join NATO without a referendum would likely be legally challenged in the country's courts in a similar way. Former Taoiseach Leo Varadkar has also highlighted the possibility that a United Ireland would likely have to reconsider defense arrangements, namely those with NATO, as the six counties of Northern Ireland are currently part of the alliance.

Polling did show a rise in support for joining NATO following the February 2022 Russian invasion of Ukraine, as a March 2022 poll reported 48% supporting NATO membership and 39% opposing it, while one in August 2022 found 52% in favor of joining and 48% opposed. By June 2023, however, the numbers had returned to prior levels, with around 34% in favour and 38% opposed. Former Secretary General of NATO Anders Fogh Rasmussen said during a visit to the country in 2013 that the "door is open" for Ireland to join NATO at any time.

=== Kosovo ===
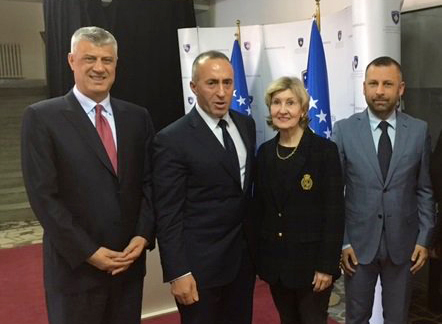
Kosovo President Hashim Thaçi meeting with US Ambassador to NATO Kay Bailey Hutchison at NATO Headquarters in 2017

According to Minister of Foreign Affairs Enver Hoxhaj, integration with NATO is a priority for Kosovo, which declared independence from Serbia in 2008. Kosovo submitted an application to join the PfP program in July 2012, and Hoxhaj stated in 2014 that the country's goal is to be a NATO member by 2022. In December 2018, Kosovar Prime Minister Ramush Haradinaj stated that Kosovo will apply for NATO membership after the formation of the Kosovo Armed Forces. Kosovo's lack of recognition by four NATO member states—Greece, Romania, Spain, and Slovakia—could impede its accession. United Nations membership, which Kosovo does not have, is considered to be necessary for NATO membership.

In February 2022, during the Russian invasion of Ukraine, Minister of Defense Armend Mehaj requested a permanent US military base in the country and an accelerated accession process to the organization, citing an "immediate need to guarantee peace, security and stability in the Western Balkans". On 3 March 2022, a resolution was passed by Kosovo's Parliament requesting that the government "take all necessary steps to join NATO, European Union, Council of Europe and other international organizations".

=== Malta ===
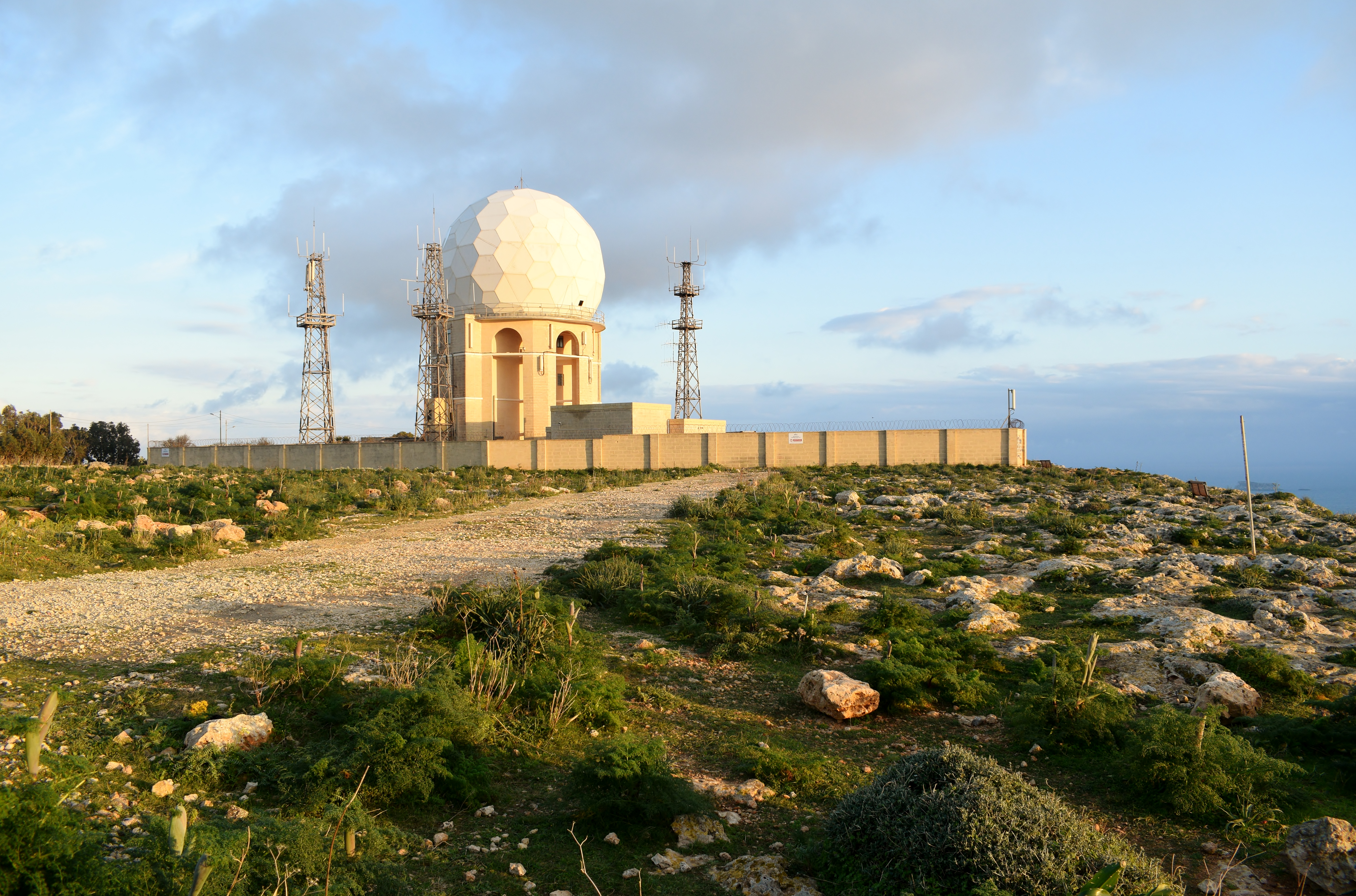
During the Cold War, NATO used radar facilities in Malta, which, like other non-NATO member European states, has generally cooperative relations with the organization.

When the North Atlantic Treaty was signed in 1949, the Mediterranean island of Malta was a dependent territory of the United Kingdom, one of the treaty's original signatories. As such, the Crown Colony of Malta shared the UK's international memberships, including NATO. Between 1952 and 1965, the headquarters of the Allied Forces Mediterranean was based in the town of Floriana, just outside Malta's capital of Valletta. When Malta gained independence in 1964, prime minister George Borg Olivier wanted the country to join NATO. Olivier was concerned that the presence of the NATO headquarters in Malta, without the security guarantees that NATO membership entailed, made the country a potential target. However, according to a memorandum he prepared at the time he was discouraged from formally submitting a membership application by Deputy Secretary General of NATO James A. Roberts. It was believed that some NATO members, including the United Kingdom, were opposed to Maltese NATO membership. As a result Olivier considered alternatives, such as seeking associate membership or unilateral security guarantees from NATO, or closing the NATO headquarters in Malta in retaliation. Ultimately, Olivier supported the alliance and signed a defense agreement with the UK for use of Maltese military facilities in exchange for around £2 million a year.

This friendly policy changed in 1971, when Dom Mintoff, of the Labour Party, was elected as prime minister. Mintoff supported neutrality as his foreign policy, and the position was later enshrined into the country's constitution in 1974 as an amendment to Article 1. The country joined the Non-Aligned Movement in 1979, at the same time when the British Royal Navy left its base at the Malta Dockyard. In 1995, under Prime Minister Eddie Fenech Adami of the Nationalist Party, Malta joined the Euro-Atlantic Partnership Council multilateral defense forum and NATO's Partnership for Peace program. When the Labour Party regained power the following year, however, it withdrew Malta from both organizations. Though the Nationalists resumed the majority in parliament in 1998, Malta did not rejoin the EAPC and PfP programs again until 2008, after the country had joined the European Union in 2004. Since re-joining, Malta has been building its relations with NATO and getting involved in wider projects including the PfP Planning and Review Process and the NATO Science for Peace and Security Program.

NATO membership is not supported by any of the country's political parties, including neither the governing Labour Party nor the opposition Nationalist Party. NATO's secretary-general Jens Stoltenberg has stated that the alliance fully respects Malta's position of neutrality, and put no pressure for the country to join the alliance. Polling done by the island-nation's Ministry of Foreign Affairs found in February 2022 that 63% of those surveyed supported the island's neutrality, and only 6% opposed the policy, with 14% undecided. A Eurobarometer survey in May 2022 found that 75% of Maltese would however support greater military cooperation within the European Union.

=== Moldova ===
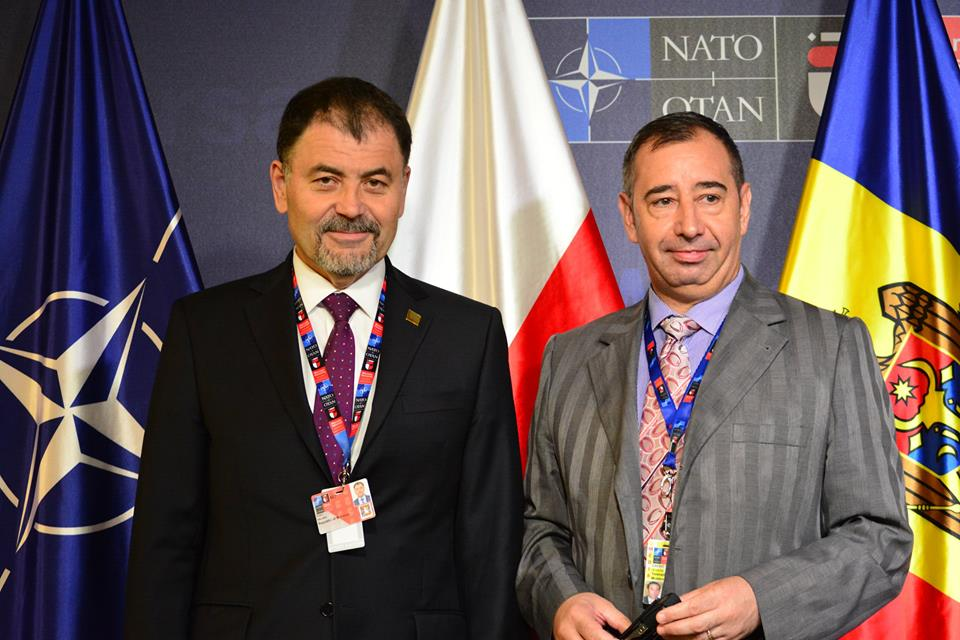
Former Defense Minister Anatol Șalaru (left) attending a NATO meeting in Warsaw in 2016

Moldova gained independence in 1991 following the collapse of the Soviet Union. The country's current constitution was adopted in 1994, and forbids the country from joining a military alliance, but some politicians, such as former Moldovan Minister of Defence Vitalie Marinuța, have suggested joining NATO as part of a larger European integration. Moldova joined NATO's Partnership for Peace in 1994, and initiated an Individual Partnership Action Plan in 2010. Moldova also participates in NATO's peacekeeping force in Kosovo. Following the 2014 annexation of Crimea by Russia, NATO officials warned that Russia might seek to annex Transnistria, a breakaway Moldovan region. This separatist issue could preclude Moldova from joining NATO.

Former Prime Minister of Moldova, Dorin Recean, supports European Union membership, but not NATO membership. Moldova's President Maia Sandu stated in January 2023 that there was "serious discussion" about joining "a larger alliance", though she did not specifically name NATO. The second largest alliance in the parliament of Moldova, the Electoral Bloc of Communists and Socialists, strongly opposes NATO membership. A poll in December 2018 found that, if given the choice in a referendum, 22% of Moldovans would vote in favor of joining NATO, while 32% would vote against it and 21% would be unsure. Some Moldovan politicians, including former Prime Minister Iurie Leancă, have also supported the idea of unifying with neighboring Romania, with which Moldova shares a language and much of its history, and a poll in April 2021 found that 43.9% of those surveyed supported that idea. Romania is a current member of both NATO and the European Union.

=== Serbia ===
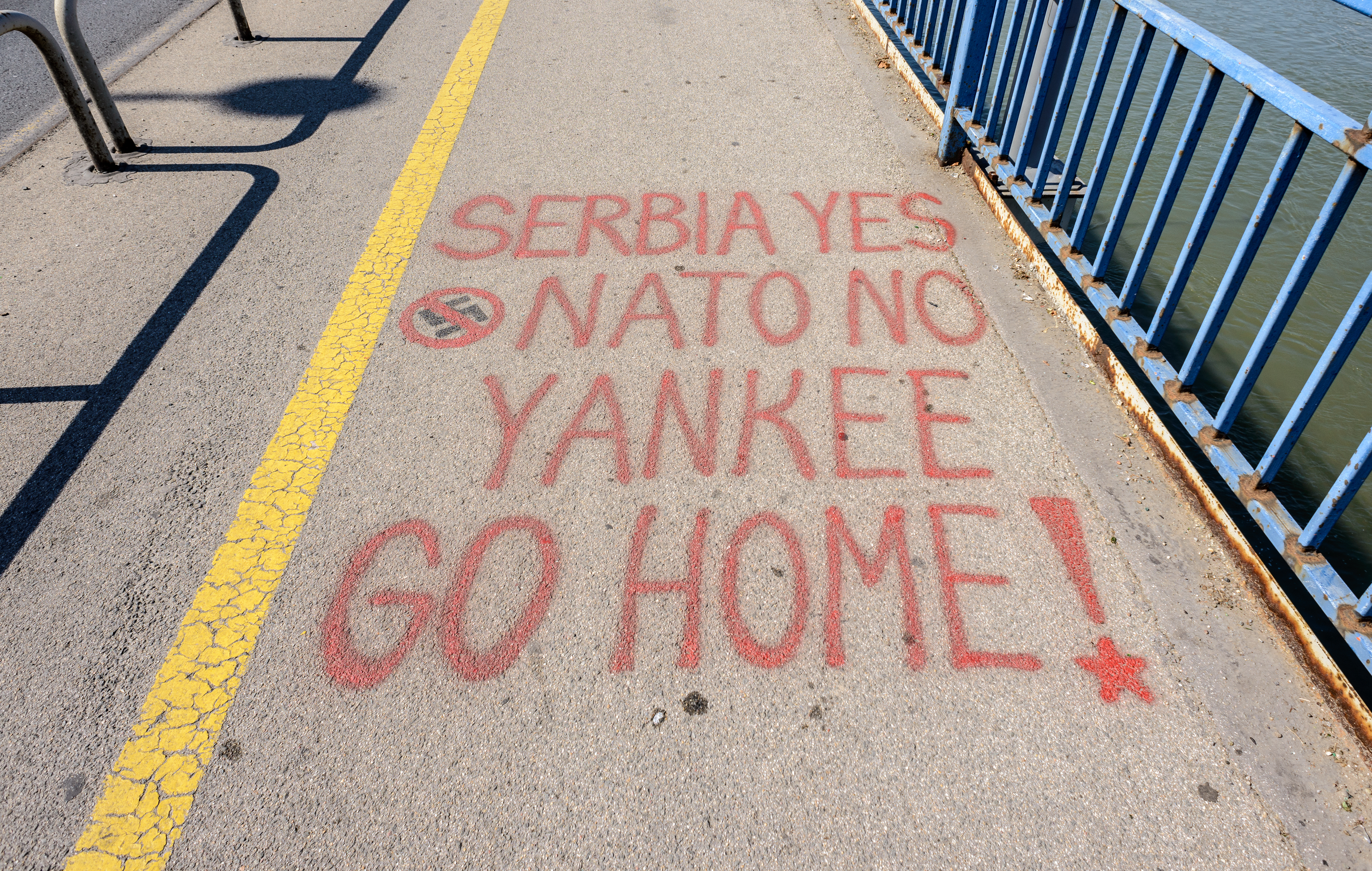
Anti-NATO graffiti on a bridge in Novi Sad

Yugoslavia's communist government sided with the Eastern Bloc at the beginning of the Cold War, but pursued a policy of neutrality following the Tito–Stalin split in 1948 after an initial indirect alignment with NATO via the Balkan Pact. It was a founding member of the Non-Aligned Movement in 1961. Since that country's dissolution most of its successor states have joined NATO, but the largest of them, Serbia, has maintained neutrality.

The NATO intervention in Bosnia and Herzegovina in 1992 against Bosnia-Serbian forces and the NATO bombing of targets in Serbia (then part of FR Yugoslavia) during the Kosovo War in 1999 resulted in strained relations between Serbia and NATO. After the overthrow of President Slobodan Milošević Serbia wanted to improve its relations with NATO, though membership in the military alliance remained highly controversial among political parties and society. In the years under Prime Minister Zoran Đinđić the country (then Serbia and Montenegro) did not rule out joining NATO, but after Đinđić's assassination in 2003 Serbia increasingly started preferring a course of military neutrality. Serbia's Parliament passed a resolution in 2007 which declared Serbia's military neutrality until such time as a referendum could be held on the issue. Relations with NATO were further strained following Kosovo's declaration of independence in 2008, while it was a protectorate of the United Nations with security support from NATO.

Serbia was invited to and joined NATO's Partnership for Peace program during the 2006 Riga summit, and in 2008 was invited to enter the intensified dialog program whenever the country was ready. On 1 October 2008, Serbian Defence Minister Dragan Šutanovac signed the Information Exchange Agreement with NATO, one of the prerequisites for fuller membership in the Partnership for Peace program. In April 2011 Serbia's request for an IPAP was approved by NATO, and Serbia submitted a draft IPAP in May 2013. The agreement was finalized on 15 January 2015. Serbian President Aleksandar Vučić, in office since 2017, reiterated in March 2022 that his government was not interested in NATO membership. A poll that month suggested that 82% of Serbians opposed joining NATO, while only 10% supported the idea. The minor Serbian Renewal Movement, which has two seats in the National Assembly, and the Liberal Democratic Party, which currently has none, remain the most vocal political parties in favor of NATO membership. The Democratic Party abandoned its pro-NATO attitude, claiming the Partnership for Peace is enough.

Serbia maintains close relations with Russia, which are due to their shared stances on the Kosovo issue and popular affinity for Russia. Serbia and Belarus are the only European states that refused to impose sanctions on Russia in response to its invasion of Ukraine.

== Other proposals ==
Some individuals have proposed expanding NATO outside of Europe, although doing so would require amending Article 10 of the North Atlantic Treaty, which specifically limits new membership to "any other European State in a position to further the principles of this Treaty and to contribute to the security of the North Atlantic area."

Christopher Sands of the Hudson Institute proposed Mexican membership of NATO in order to enhance NATO cooperation with Mexico and develop a "North American pillar" for regional security, while Christopher Skaluba and Gabriela Doyle of the Atlantic Council promoted the idea as way to support democracy in Latin America. In June 2013, Colombian President Juan Manuel Santos stated his hope that Colombia's cooperation with NATO could result in NATO membership, though his Foreign Minister, Juan Carlos Pinzon, quickly clarified that Colombia is not actively seeking NATO membership. In June 2018, Qatar expressed its wish to join NATO, but its application was rejected by NATO. In March 2019, US President Donald Trump made Brazil a major non-NATO ally, and expressed support for the eventual accession of Brazil into NATO. France's Foreign Ministry responded to this by reiterating the limitations of Article 10 on new membership, and suggested that Brazil could instead seek to become a global partner of NATO, like Colombia.

Several other current NATO global partners have been proposed as candidates for full membership. In 2006, Ivo Daalder, later the US Ambassador to NATO, proposed a "global NATO" that would incorporate democratic states from around the world, including Asia-Pacific partners Australia, New Zealand, Japan, and South Korea, collectively known as the Indo-Pacific Four (IP4), who all signed on as global partners in the 2010s, as well as Brazil, South Africa, and India. In 2007, then-US presidential candidate Rudy Giuliani suggested including Singapore and Israel, among others. In 2020, Trump stated that Middle Eastern countries should be admitted to NATO. Because of its close ties to Europe, Cape Verde has been suggested as a future member and the government of Cape Verde suggested an interest in joining as recently as 2019.

Internal enlargement is the process of new member states arising from the break-up of or secession from an existing member state. There have been and are a number of active separatist movements within member states. After a long history of opposition to NATO, the separatist Scottish National Party agreed at its conference in 2012 that it wished for Scotland to retain its NATO membership were it to become independent from the United Kingdom. In 2014, in the run up to the self-determination referendum, the Generalitat de Catalunya published a memo suggesting an independent Catalonia would want to keep all of Spain's current foreign relationships, including NATO, though other nations, namely Belgium, have questioned whether quick membership for breakaway regions could encourage secessionist movements elsewhere.

== See also ==
- Controversy regarding NATO's eastward expansion
- Enlargement of the European Union
- NATO open door policy
- Withdrawal from NATO
- Euro-Atlantic Partnership Council
- List of countries in Europe by military expenditures

== Bibliography ==
- Ambrosio, Thomas (2013). Authoritarian Backlash: Russian Resistance to Democratization in the Former Soviet Union. Ashgate Publishing, Ltd. ISBN 978-1-4094-9889-6. Archived from the original on 12 January 2023.
- Agius, Christine (2006). The social construction of Swedish neutrality: Challenges to Swedish identity and sovereignty. Manchester University Press. ISBN 978-1-84779-199-3. Archived from the original on 12 January 2023.
- Barany, Zoltan (2003). The Future of NATO Expansion: Four Case Studies. Cambridge University Press. ISBN 978-1-139-44044-8. Archived from the original on 12 January 2023.
- David, Charles-Philippe; Levesque, Jacques (1999). Future of NATO: Enlargement, Russia, and European Security. McGill-Queen's Press. ISBN 978-0-7735-6785-6. Archived from the original on 12 January 2023.
- Frappi, Carlo; Carati, Andrea (2009). NATO in the 60th anniversary of the North Atlantic Treaty. FrancoAngeli. ISBN 978-88-568-1977-9. Archived from the original on 12 January 2023.
- Gheciu, Alexandra (2005). NATO in the New Europe: The Politics of International Socialization After the Cold War. Stanford University Press. ISBN 978-0-8047-6766-8. Archived from the original on 12 January 2023.
- Goldgeier, James; Shifrinson, Joshua R. Itzkowitz, eds. (2023). Evaluating NATO Enlargement: From Cold War Victory to the Russia-Ukraine War. Palgrave Macmillan. doi:10.1007/978-3-031-23364-7. ISBN 978-3-031-23364-7. S2CID 257156181. Archived from the original on 28 March 2023.
- Goldgeier, James. "NATO Enlargement and the Problem of Value Complexity." Journal of Cold War Studies (2020) 22#4 pp 146–174
- Gorbachev, Mikhail (1996). Memoirs. London: Doubleday. ISBN 978-0-385-40668-0.
- Grenfell, Julian; Jopling, Thomas Michael (2008). FRONTEX: the EU external borders agency, 9th report of session 2007–08. House of Lords Stationery Office. ISBN 978-0-10-401232-1. Archived from the original on 12 January 2023.
- Itzkowitz Shifrinson, Joshua R. (2016). "Deal or No Deal? The End of the Cold War and the U.S. Offer to Limit NATO Expansion". International Security. 40 (4): 7–44. doi:10.1162/ISEC_a_00236. S2CID 57562966.
- Magone, José María (2009). Contemporary Spanish Politics. Taylor & Francis. ISBN 978-0-415-42188-1. Archived from the original on 12 January 2023.
- Smith, Simon C. (2006). Malta: British documents on the end of empire. University of London Institute of Commonwealth Studies. ISBN 978-0-11-290590-5. Archived from the original on 12 January 2023.
- Spohr, Kristina. "Precluded or precedent-setting? The 'NATO enlargement question' in the triangular Bonn-Washington-Moscow diplomacy of 1990–1991." Journal of Cold War Studies 14.4 (2012): 4–54. online Archived 25 February 2022 at the Wayback Machine
- Thiele, Ralph (2005). Mediterranean Security After EU and NATO Enlargement. Rubbettino Editore. ISBN 978-88-498-1037-0. Archived from the original on 12 January 2023.
- Trachtenberg, Marc. "The United States and the NATO Non-extension Assurances of 1990: New Light on an Old Problem? Archived 26 January 2021 at the Wayback Machine" International Security 45:3 (2021): 162–203. The United States and the NATO Non-extension Assurances of 1990: New Light on an Old Problem? Archived 18 May 2022 at the Wayback Machine and online commentary on H-DIPLO 2021 Archived 18 May 2022 at the Wayback Machine
- Trifunovska, Snežana (1996). The Transatlantic Alliance on the Eve of the New Millennium. Martinus Nijhoff Publishers. ISBN 978-90-411-0243-0. Archived from the original on 12 January 2023.
- Trifunovska, Snežana (2010). North Atlantic Treaty Organization. Kluwer Law International. ISBN 978-90-411-3328-1.
- Wolchik, Sharon L.; Curry, Jane Leftwich (2011). Central and East European Politics: From Communism to Democracy. Rowman & Littlefield. ISBN 978-0-7425-6734-4. Archived from the original on 12 January 2023.
- Yekelchyk, Serhy (2007). Ukraine: Birth of a Modern Nation. Oxford University Press. ISBN 978-0-19-530546-3. Archived from the original on 12 January 2023.
