= Vilnius letter =

Declaration of support for the 2003 invasion of Iraq

The Vilnius letter was a declaration of support for the 2003 invasion of Iraq from the nations of the Vilnius Group. It was published at the height of the Iraq disarmament crisis of early 2003, expressing confidence in the evidence presented by the U.S that Iraq had violated UN resolutions.

== Background ==
- 14 January 2003: Jack Straw, the United Kingdom's Secretary of State for Foreign and Commonwealth Affairs, announces that London would not wait for a UN decision to attack Iraq and would act on its own. Meanwhile, two other countries, Poland and Macedonia, offer to provide troops.
- 27 January 2003: Hans Blix presents the UN Security Council with the report that the inspectors had been granted access to every site they needed to inspect, but he says that "It is not enough to open doors."
- 28 January 2003: United States President George W. Bush delivers his State of the Union address to the United States' Congress, alleging that Saddam Hussein had ties with terrorist organizations, and that Iraq was a serious threat against the security of U.S. citizens as the world's most dangerous producer of weapons of mass-destruction.
- the letter of the eight of January 30, 2003, that according to many observers torpedoed the European Union's cautious position in the developing crisis, followed Colin Powell's assertion in the UN Security Council of Iraq's continuing development of illicit weapons.

== Overview ==
The letter of the eight was followed on 6 February by a letter from the Vilnius Group comprising Albania, Bulgaria, Croatia, the Czech Republic, Estonia, Latvia, Lithuania, North Macedonia, Romania, Slovenia and Slovakia which effectively supported a US military intervention in Iraq. The letter expressed confidence in the evidence presented by Powell and agreed that Iraq had clearly violated UN resolutions. In capitals around the world, the letter could not be interpreted as anything but support of a US military intervention in Iraq.

By expressing support for the 2003 invasion of Iraq — by that point seemingly inevitable — the Vilnius letter was a public rebuke by ten EU candidates of France's and Germany's vocal opposition to American and British policy. The signatories were later dubbed "New Europe" by the US Defense Secretary Donald Rumsfeld, and were to receive emotional criticism from the French president Jacques Chirac. Observers noted that the signatories by the letter indicated that they this time prioritized U.S. interests instead of the European Union's at a time when it was too late to reverse their admittance into the Union.

According to reports in respected national newspapers, the US envoy Bruce P. Jackson was the architect behind both the letter of the eight and the Vilnius letter. He arranged a meeting in the Lithuanian embassy in Washington, where the foreign ministers of all ten countries participated. The text had been proposed in advance, but according to the press reports it was Jackson who convinced the participants to accept the proposal and to disregard efforts by Bulgaria — then a rotating member of the UN Security Council — to alter the text. Since the early 1990s, Jackson had been an informal advisor to central European governments, advising them on the road to admission into NATO. He allegedly now convinced the foreign ministers of the Vilnius ten, that their support for the US in this international conflict would give them much better chances in the US Congress when it was to vote on accepting those countries into NATO.

== Criticism ==
The letter was met with public consternation in many countries on the European continent — and surprise and criticism from several governments in the European Union. In retrospect, the letter is sometimes pointed at as a significant warning of the crisis and deadlock that came to signify the European Union the following years, with its inability to move forward the issues of defense cooperation, constitution, "transparency" and democratic legitimacy, or integration of the new member countries; and it has been questioned whether the governments in question in fact acted supportive of Anglo-Saxon interests critical or fearful of a strengthened EU, which these governments with their fresh experience of the Soviet Union's detrimental dominance on national independence might have been sensitive for. Such criticism may hint at the Vilnius letter as a tool for U.S. policies to divide and rule, citing essays from the think tank PNAC. More diplomatic criticism, partly following the same lines, was made by among others the French government, noting that the signing countries' admission to the EU was not jeopardized, but US promises — not least in terms of funding of future military improvements — may have been at stake.

For their part the signing central European governments emphasized the Vilnius letter as a commitment to such traditional European and American values as free trade and democracy — and also their participation in the War against terrorism. The letter referred to the "compelling evidence" presented by US Secretary of State Colin Powell to the UN, and added: "Our countries understand the dangers posed by tyranny and the special responsibility of democracies to defend our shared values." Critics argued that, rather than defending shared values, the signatories were undermining the authority of international law and the United Nations.

Some central European newspapers pointed out the foreign policy problem their governments faced wasn't primarily connected with Iraq but instead concerned the clash between the regional powers of the European continent: France and Germany on one side, and the Central Europe, the United States and the United Kingdom, on the other, with Russia as a further complicating factor. Critics argued that by signing the Vilnius letter, they were responsible for aggravating the crisis in the European Union, and putting national security in danger.

Criticism both in EU countries and in the signatory countries also pointed out the return to a client-patron pattern that beside being against the spirit and wellbeing of the EU also was an unexpected and humiliating return to Cold War habits, although with the U.S. instead of the USSR in the role as patron, when WP elites echoed embarrassing propaganda easily revealed as support for Soviet imperialism.
