= The letter of the eight =

2003 open letter from European leaders

The "letter of the eight" was an open letter, jointly signed by the prime ministers of five of the then fifteen members of the European Union together with three high representatives for the Central European countries that were to enter the union in 2004, published in the Wall Street Journal, The Times of London, and other international newspapers on 30 January 2003 under the title "Europe and America Must Stand United". It expressed indirect support for United States ambition of a régime change in Iraq in the lead-up to the 2003 invasion of Iraq. To most observers it demonstrated a total division within the EU in respect to foreign policy and attitudes towards international law.

The letter was "conceived of and commissioned" by Mike Gonzalez, at the time a senior editor for the Wall Street Journal's Europe edition.

The letter, from the leaders of Czech Republic, Denmark, Hungary, Italy, Poland, Portugal, Spain and the United Kingdom, accused Saddam Hussein of continuing to develop weapons of mass destruction and urged the UN Security Council to act against that threat. The statement's content was not controversial, as it said that Saddam Hussein should not be allowed to violate UN resolutions, but the exclusion of ten of EU's 15 members was interpreted as a signal of deep division and the difficulty of implementing the EU's Common Foreign and Security Policy.

The letter was on 6 February followed by the Vilnius letter, a more outspoken declaration of support for the position of the United States from the Vilnius Group composed of Estonia, Latvia, Lithuania, Slovakia, Slovenia, Croatia, Albania, North Macedonia, Romania, and a member of the UN Security Council, Bulgaria.

== Signatories of the "letter of eight" ==
- José María Aznar
- José Manuel Barroso
- Silvio Berlusconi
- Tony Blair
- Václav Havel
- Péter Medgyessy
- Leszek Miller
- Anders Fogh Rasmussen

== See also ==
- New Europe
- Old Europe and New Europe
- Preparations for 2003 invasion of Iraq
