= Adriatic Charter =

Association of countries for joining NATO

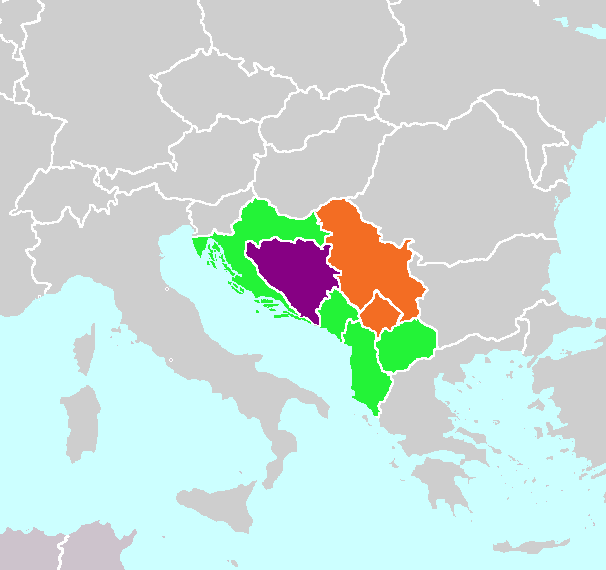
- Green: Members of NATO, Purple: Members not in NATO, Orange: Observer States (United States not shown)
- Formation: 2 May 2003; 23 years ago
- Members: 6 members: Albania; Croatia; North Macedonia; United States; Bosnia and Herzegovina; Montenegro; 3 observers: Serbia; Kosovo; Slovenia

The Adriatic Charter is an association formed by Albania, Croatia, North Macedonia and the United States for the purpose of aiding their attempts to join NATO.

== History ==
The Adriatic Charter was signed on 2 May 2003 in Tirana under the aegis of the United States. The role of the United States has caused some confusion; in discussions in the other member states, the Charter is often called the U.S.-Adriatic Charter. In September 2008 Montenegro and Bosnia and Herzegovina were invited to join the Charter and joined on 4 December 2008. Serbia accepted observer status at the same time. On 1 April 2009, Albania and Croatia became the first of the group to join NATO. On 5 June 2017, Montenegro joined NATO. On 27 March 2020, North Macedonia joined NATO.

== Members ==
Joined 2003

- Albania (NATO member since 2009)
- Croatia (NATO member since 2009)
- North Macedonia (NATO member since 2020)
- United States (NATO founder)

Joined 2008

- Bosnia and Herzegovina
- Montenegro (NATO member since 2017)

=== Observers ===
Since 2008

- Serbia

Since 2012

- Kosovo

Since 2023

- Slovenia

== See also ==
- Vilnius Group – a similar association of NATO-aspirant countries.
