= Old Europe and New Europe =

Terms used to contrast parts of Europe with each other in a rhetorical way

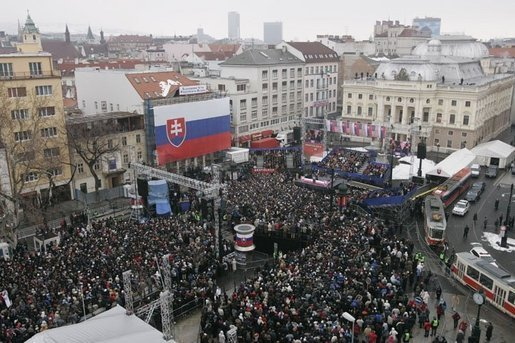
President George W. Bush and Slovakia's Prime Minister Mikulas Dzurinda are greeted by a crowd of thousands gathered in Bratislava's Hviezdoslavovo Square (February 2005).

Old Europe and New Europe are terms used to contrast parts of Europe with each other in a rhetorical way. In the 21st century, the terms have been used by conservative political analysts in the United States to describe post-Communist era countries in Central and Eastern Europe as 'newer' and parts of Western Europe as 'older', suggesting that the latter were less important. The term Old Europe attracted attention when it was used by then-U.S. Secretary of Defense Donald Rumsfeld in January 2003 to refer to democratic European countries before the fall of Communism in Europe, after which a significant number of new members have eventually joined NATO, the European Union and other European bodies.

Old Europe can mean – in a wider sense – Europe of an older historical period, as opposed to a newer historical period. Before Rumsfeld’s use, the term had been used in various historical contexts to refer to Europe as the "Old World" as opposed to America as the "New World"; or, in Marxist usage, to Europe in the expectation of Communist revolutions.

== Rumsfeld's term ==
On January 22, 2003, Secretary of Defense Donald Rumsfeld answered a question from Dutch journalist Charles Groenhuijsen about a potential U.S. invasion of Iraq:

Q: Sir, a question about the mood among European allies. You were talking about the Islamic world a second ago. But now the European allies. If you look at, for example, France, Germany, also a lot of people in my own country -- I'm from Dutch public TV, by the way -- it seems that a lot of Europeans rather give the benefit of the doubt to Saddam Hussein than President George Bush. These are U.S. allies. What do you make of that?

Rumsfeld: Well, it's -- what do I make of it?

Q: They have no clerics. They have no Muslim clerics there.

Rumsfeld: Are you helping me? (Laughter.) Do you think I need help? (Laughter.)

What do I think about it? Well, there isn't anyone alive who wouldn't prefer unanimity. I mean, you just always would like everyone to stand up and say, Way to go! That's the right thing to do, United States.

Now, we rarely find unanimity in the world. I was ambassador to NATO, and I -- when we would go in and make a proposal, there wouldn't be unanimity. There wouldn't even be understanding. And we'd have to be persuasive. We'd have to show reasons. We'd have to -- have to give rationales. We'd have to show facts. And, by golly, I found that Europe on any major issue is given -- if there's leadership and if you're right, and if your facts are persuasive, Europe responds. And they always have.

Now, you're thinking of Europe as Germany and France. I don't. I think that's old Europe. If you look at the entire NATO Europe today, the center of gravity is shifting to the east. And there are a lot of new members. And if you just take the list of all the members of NATO and all of those who have been invited in recently -- what is it? Twenty-six, something like that? -- you're right. Germany has been a problem, and France has been a problem.

Q: But opinion polls --

Rumsfeld: But -- just a minute. Just a minute. But you look at vast numbers of other countries in Europe. They're not with France and Germany on this, they're with the United States.

The expression was interpreted as a dig against a "sclerotic" and old-fashioned Western Europe. Those countries, Rumsfeld added on the same occasion, were "of no importance." It became a potent symbol, especially after division emerged over Iraq between France and Germany and some of the new Central and Southeastern European entrants and applicants to NATO and the European Union.

Rumsfeld would later claim his comment was "unintentional," and that he had meant to say "old NATO" instead of "old Europe;" during his time as ambassador to NATO, there were only fifteen alliance members, and France and Germany had played a much larger role than after the admission of many new (particularly Eastern European) countries. Nonetheless, he claims he "was amused by the ruckus" when the term became debated.

Further diplomatic tension built up when Rumsfeld pointed out in February 2003, that Germany, Cuba and Libya were the only nations completely opposing a possible war in Iraq (a statement that was formally correct at the time). This was interpreted by many that he would put Germany on a common level with dictatorships violating human rights.

== Later developments ==
French foreign minister Dominique de Villepin referred to Rumsfeld's remark by describing France as "an old country", which had known "wars, occupation and barbarity", during United Nations Security Council debates about military action against Iraq.

The German translation altes Europa was the word of the year for 2003 in Germany, because German politicians and commentators responded by often using it in a sarcastic way. It was frequently used with pride and a reference to a perceived position of greater moral integrity. The terms altes Europa and Old Europe have subsequently surfaced in European economic and political discourse. For example, in a January 2005 unveiling for the new Airbus A380 aircraft, German chancellor Gerhard Schröder said, "There is the tradition of good old Europe that has made this possible." A BBC News article about the unveiling said Schröder "deliberately redefined the phrase previously used by... Rumsfeld."

Outside of Rumsfeld's usage of "Old Europe", the term New Europe (and neues Europa) also appeared, indicating either the European states that supported the war, the Central European states that had been newly accepted to the EU, or a new economically and technologically dynamic and liberal Europe, often including the United Kingdom.

Rumsfeld made fun of his statement shortly before a 2005 diplomatic trip to Europe. "When I first mentioned I might be travelling in France and Germany it raised some eyebrows. One wag said it ought to be an interesting trip after all that has been said. I thought for a moment and then I replied: 'Oh, that was the old Rumsfeld.'"

The phrase continued to be used after Rumsfeld's tenure. In a March 2009 speech to the United States Congress, British Prime Minister Gordon Brown said "There is no old Europe, no new Europe. There is only your friend Europe," which The Boston Globe called "an oblique shot at" Rumsfeld. The next month, speaking in Prague, U.S. President Barack Obama, echoing Brown's words, said, "in my view, there is no old Europe or new Europe. There is only a united Europe."

== Earlier uses ==
The Communist Manifesto by Karl Marx and Friedrich Engels starts with the words:

A spectre is haunting Europe — the spectre of communism. All the powers of old Europe have entered into a holy alliance to exorcise this spectre: Pope and Tsar, Metternich and Guizot, French Radicals and German police-spies.

When Marx used the term in 1848, the year of failed liberal revolutions across Europe, he was referring to the restoration of Ancien régime dynasties, following the defeat of Napoleon. Of his three sets of pairs, each pair links figures who might on the surface be considered adversaries, in alliances that he clearly sees as unholy. An "Old Europe" must find a mental contrast with a posited "New Europe".

In his ultra-nationalistic, anti-European book of 1904, America Rules the World, E. David used 'Old Europe' in the following context:

The true American citizen is by nature brave, honest, amiable, hospitable, patriotic, energetic and intelligent; he is practical and yet idealistic and enthusiastic. Cultivation and refinement make him a gentleman equal, if not superior, to the gentry of the best educated classes of Old Europe for manners and behavior. An educated American is the best and most generous of friends.

In his book La Hora de los Pueblos (1968), Argentine politician Juan Perón used the phrase when he enunciated the main principles of his purported new tricontinental political vision:

Mao is at the head of Asia, Nasser of Africa, De Gaulle of the old Europe and Castro of Latin America.

== See also ==
- Common Foreign and Security Policy of the European Union
- Euroscepticism
- Old World
- Letter of the eight
- Pan-European identity
- Transatlantic relations
