= Vilnius Group =

Map of member countries

The Vilnius Group was an organization of NATO aspirant countries, created in May 2000, aimed at practical cooperation, exchange of information and lobbying for their candidacy in the NATO capitals.

As motto of the Vilnius group was chosen:

While each country should be considered on its own merits, we believe that the integration of each democracy will be a success for us all and the integration of each democracy will be a success for Europe and NATO.

The members were: Albania, Bulgaria, Croatia, Estonia, Latvia, Lithuania, North Macedonia, Romania, Slovakia, Slovenia.

== NATO accession ==
On March 29, 2004, Bulgaria, Estonia, Latvia, Lithuania, Romania, Slovakia and Slovenia joined NATO at the 2004 Istanbul summit. Albania and Croatia joined the alliance in 2009. North Macedonia joined the alliance in 2020, having had its accession process delayed by Greece due to a long dispute over the name "Macedonia" that would eventually be resolved by the Prespa Agreement.

== See also ==
- Adriatic Charter - a similar NATO-aspirant association.
- Vilnius letter
- Visegrád Group - a former EU-membership aspirant group, now EU regional partnership initiative.
- GUAM - Political association of former Soviet countries.
