= Didier Seeuws =

Belgian civil servant and diplomat

Secretary-General of the Council of the European Union
- Acting
- Assumed office 1 May 2022 Serving with William Shapcott (Acting)
- Preceded by: Jeppe Tranholm-Mikkelsen
- Succeeded by: Thérèse Blanchet (designate)

Director for Transport, Telecommunications and Energy General Secretariat of the Council of the European Union
- In office 1 December 2014 – June 2016

Personal details
- Born: 1 August 1965 (age 60); Ghent, Belgium

Didier Seeuws (born 1 August 1965) is a Belgian civil servant and diplomat who has been appointed by the European Union (EU) to lead a special internal task force in connection with the United Kingdom's withdrawal from the EU.

== Early life and education ==
Seeuws was born in Sint-Amandsberg, Ghent, and studied diplomatic sciences and European law.

== Career ==
Seeuws joined the Belgian civil service in 1989, and remained as a trainee diplomat until 1991. From July 1991 to July 1995, he was an economic and trade attaché to the Belgian embassy in Washington, D.C. He was an attaché to the trade minister from August 1995 to July 1998, responsible for investment and bilateral relations with North America and Asia. From August 1998 to July 2002, he worked as an adviser to the Permanent Representation of Belgium to the European Union (EU), in charge of relations with the European Parliament. He returned to Belgium in 2002, and from August 2002 to July 2003 worked as the spokesperson for the foreign ministry. From August 2003 to July 2007, he served as the spokesperson for the Prime Minister of Belgium, then Guy Verhofstadt.

On 1 August 2007, he assumed the role of Deputy Permanent Representative of Belgium to the EU, succeeding Louis Mouraux. He was the deputy to Jean de Ruyt, appointed a few days later. Notably, Seeuws held this role in 2010, when Belgium held the rotating presidency of the Council of Ministers. According to The Guardian, he has been "credited with negotiating a breakthrough on the European patent system, an issue that had been deadlocked for more than 30 years."

In June 2011, Dirk Wouters was appointed as the Permanent Representative of Belgium to the EU, replacing de Ruyt. As Belgian custom did not allow both roles in the representation to be held by Flemings, Seeuws was appointed as a special counsellor to Herman Van Rompuy, the President of the European Council. This role also effectively made him "the right-hand man to Frans Van Daele", who headed Van Rompuy's private office. Olivier Belle was appointed to succeed Seeuws as the Deputy Permanent Representative of Belgium. In 2012, Seeuws took over from Van Daele as the Chief of Staff (chef de cabinet) of the private office of the President of the European Council, Van Rompuy.

On 1 December 2014, Seeuws was appointed as the Director of Transport, Telecommunications and Energy in the General Secretariat of the Council of the European Union, which coincided with Donald Tusk replacing Van Rompuy as President of the European Council. Seeuws succeeded Jirí Burianek, who became the Secretary General of the European Committee of the Regions. In June 2016, Seeuws was appointed as the head of a special internal task force to ensure the proper functioning of EU institutions following the United Kingdom's withdrawal from the European Union ('Brexit') that the British people decided upon in their EU referendum on 23 June 2016. Martin Selmayr, the Head of the Cabinet of the President of the European Commission, Jean-Claude Juncker, was reported to have dismissed Seeuws' appointment as a "power grab" by the European Council. One European Commission official told Politico that "Martin dismissed it as a ridiculous move."
