= General Secretariat of the Council of the European Union =

EU service organization

Agency overview
- Formed: 9 September 1952; 73 years ago
- Type: Secretariat
- Headquarters: Europa building; Justus Lipsius building
- Agency executive: Thérèse Blanchet, Secretary-General

The General Secretariat of the Council of the European Union (GSC), also known as Council Secretariat, assists the Council of the European Union, the presidency of the Council of the European Union, the European Council and the president of the European Council. The General Secretariat is headed by the secretary-general of the Council of the European Union. The Secretariat is divided into eight directorates-general, each administered by a director-general. Other two departments are administered by deputy directors-general.

The Secretariat is based in Brussels, in the Europa building and the Justus Lipsius building. The respective secretariats of the Schengen Agreement and of now-defunct Western European Union and European Political Cooperation have along the years been integrated with the Council Secretariat.

The current secretary-general is Thérèse Blanchet, who was appointed on 1 November 2022. She succeeded Jeppe Tranholm-Mikkelsen.

== Tasks ==
- It "shall be closely and continually involved in organising, coordinating and ensuring the coherence of the Council's work and implementation of its annual programme". This involves 'traditional tasks', such as planning, convening and organizing the meetings (around 100 sessions of the council, and more than 3500 meetings of working parties and other gatherings every year, e.g. extraordinary Council meetings or EU meetings with other states), arranging rooms and translation, making the minutes, acting as the council's registrar and memory by keeping archives, and being a depositary for international agreements.
- It acts as a legal adviser and political counsellor to the EU Presidency. It advises the Presidency, especially in working out the compromises on which Council decisions and other acts will be based. Members of the Secretariat's Legal Service are on hand at all important meetings to advise on issues raised in the discussions and to clarify the legal aspects of certain procedures. The Legal Service also represents the council before the Court of Justice of the European Union, the General Court (European Union) and the European Union Civil Service Tribunal.
- The Council Secretariat also plays an important role in the EU's intergovernmental conferences (IGC), because it provides the IGC Secretariat. Apart from legal advice, it also tries to be an honest broker among member states. Close observers have argued that the Council Secretariat, together with the Presidency, is the most important actor in the IGC.

== Organisation ==
The organisation of the General Secretariat is decided by a simple majority of votes by the council. The Secretary-General is also appointed by the council.

It currently consists of 7 directorates-general, the Legal Service, 5 departments under the Secretary-General (e.g. internal audit, general political questions) and has around 3200 employees.

=== Directorates-general ===
- Directorate-General ORG - Organisational Development and Services
- Directorate-General LIFE - Agriculture, Fisheries, Social Affairs and Health
- Directorate-General RELEX - Foreign Affairs, Enlargement and Civil Protection
- Directorate-General JAI - Justice and Home Affairs
- Directorate-General TREE - Environment, Education, Transport and Energy
- Directorate-General COMM - Communication and Document Management
- Directorate-General ECOMP - Economic Affairs and Competitiveness
- Directorate-General GIP - Directorate-general for General and Institutional Policy

The following services are headed by a Deputy Director-General:

- LING - Translation Service
- SMART - Digital Services

== See also ==
- Common Foreign and Security Policy
- High Representative of the Union for Foreign Affairs and Security Policy
- History of the European Union
- Intergovernmental Conference
- President of the European Parliament
- Secretariat-General of the European Commission
