= Secretary-General of the Council of the European Union =

Political office of the European Union

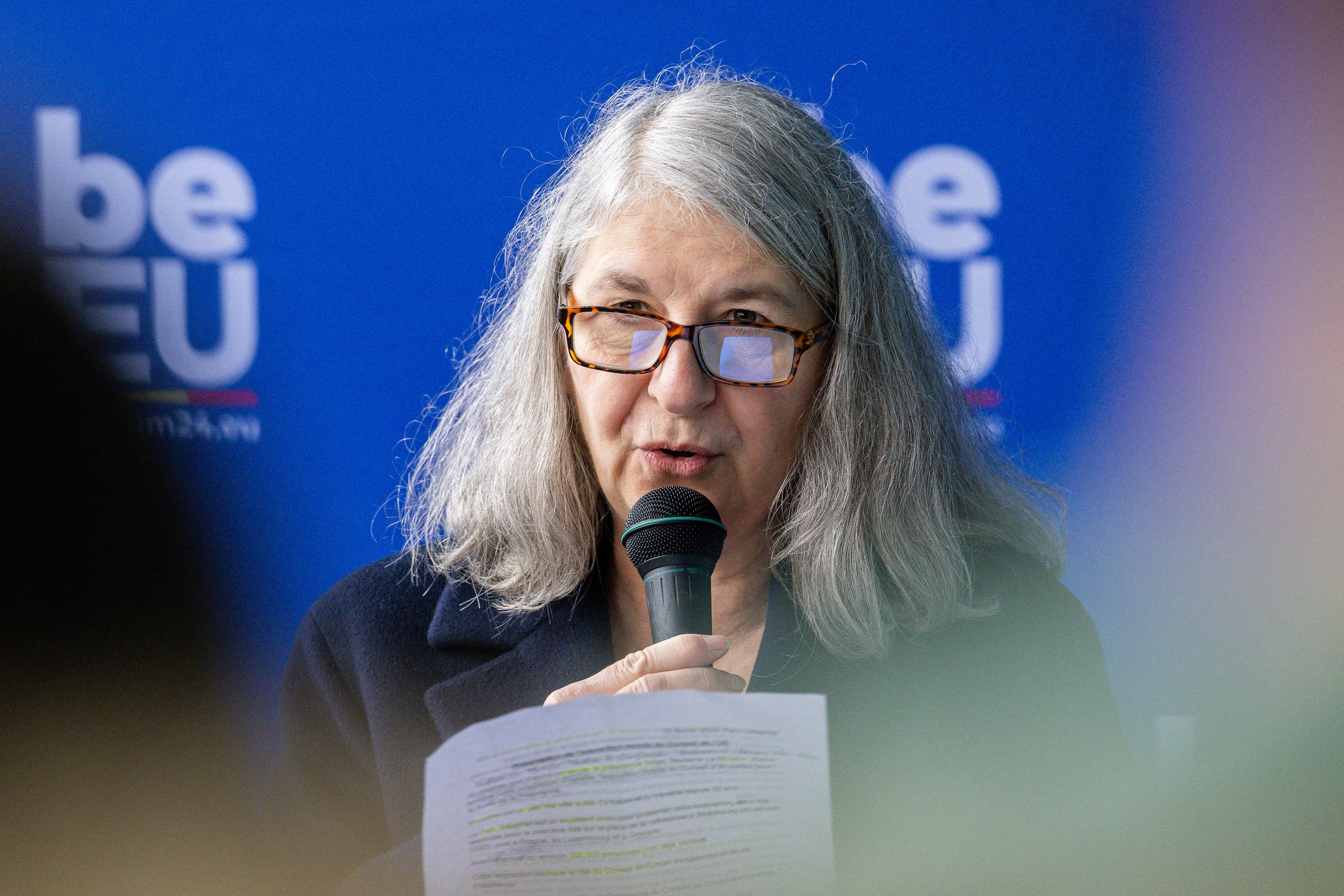
- Incumbent; Thérèse Blanchet since 1 November 2022
- Council Secretariat
- Seat: Europa building; Justus Lipsius building
- Appointer: Council of the European Union
- Term length: Five years renewable
- Constituting instrument: Treaties of the European Union
- Formation: 9 September 1952
- First holder: Christian Calmes
- Salary: €17,697.68 per month (2010)

The secretary-general of the Council of the European Union heads the General Secretariat of the Council of the European Union. In October 2022, the Council appointed Thérèse Blanchet as the Secretary-General of the Council for a five-year term, from 1 November 2022 to 31 October 2027.

Previously, the post holder was also the High Representative for the Common Foreign and Security Policy, President of the European Defence Agency and the Western European Union. The Treaty of Amsterdam, which entered into force in 1999, created the office of the High Representative for the Common Foreign and Security Policy and specified that the Secretary-General would occupy that position simultaneously. Javier Solana exercised both functions from 1999 until 2009. The Lisbon Treaty, which took effect on 1 December 2009, redefined the post of High Representative and again separated it from the office of Secretary-General of the Council.

As of 2010, the secretary-general's basic pay is equal to that of a top-tier civil servant: €17,697.68 per month.

== List of secretaries-general ==
No.	Portrait	Secretary-General	Took office	Left office	Time in office	Country	Ref.
1	Christian Calmes	Christian Calmes (1913–1995)	9 September 1952	14 June 1973	20 years, 278 days	Luxembourg	
2	Nicolas Hommel [lb]	Nicolas Hommel (1915–2001)	1 July 1973	7 October 1980	7 years, 98 days	Luxembourg	
3	Niels Ersbøll	Niels Ersbøll (1926–2026)	8 October 1980	31 August 1994	13 years, 327 days	Denmark	
4	Jürgen Trumpf	Jürgen Trumpf (1931–2023)	1 September 1994	17 October 1999	5 years, 46 days	Germany	
5	Javier Solana	Javier Solana (born 1942)	18 October 1999	1 December 2009	10 years, 44 days	Spain	
6	Pierre de Boissieu	Pierre de Boissieu (born 1945)	1 December 2009	26 June 2011	1 year, 207 days	France	
7	Uwe Corsepius	Uwe Corsepius (born 1960)	26 June 2011	30 June 2015	4 years, 4 days	Germany	
8	Jeppe Tranholm-Mikkelsen	Jeppe Tranholm-Mikkelsen (born 1962)	1 July 2015	7 October 2022	7 years, 98 days	Denmark	
9	Thérèse Blanchet	Thérèse Blanchet (born 1962)	1 November 2022	Incumbent	3 years, 310 days	France	

== See also ==
- President of the European Council
- The General Secretariat of the Council
