= Christian Calmes =

Luxembourgish lawyer and historian (1913–1995)

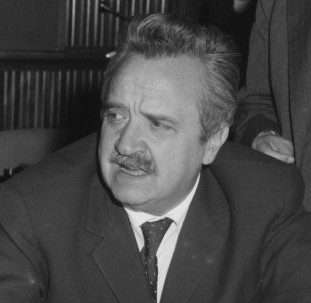
Christian Calmes (1964)

Christian Calmes (11 July 1913 – 5 July 1995) was a Luxembourgish civil servant, lawyer, and historian. He served as Secretary-General of the precursor to the Council of the European Union from its inception as part of the European Coal and Steel Community in 1952 until 1973.

He attended the Lycée classique in Echternach, before studying law in Strasbourg and Paris. In 1940, as a sign of protest against the Nazi occupation of Luxembourg he closed his legal firm, and became a manual labourer in Karelshaff near Colmar-Berg. As a member of the Resistance, he was imprisoned in October 1943 in the Grund, and was later interned in Hinzert concentration camp for 18 months. After escaping in March 1945, he hid until the end of the war. After the war, he worked again as a lawyer, then worked for the government from 1947, as an attaché, legation secretary, government councillor and highest-ranking diplomat in the foreign ministry. He was involved in the negotiations for the Benelux Treaty. From 1981 he was court marshal to the Grand Ducal Family.

Calmes was President of the Young Lawyers of Luxembourg from 1945 to 1946. He wrote two books on the history of Luxembourg: Histoire contemporaine du Grand-Duché de Luxembourg (1968) and Au fil de l'Histoire (1968, with his father). They have been printed in several editions since, and the former has been widely used as a textbook. Calmes was Grand Marshal of Luxembourg from 1981 until 1984.

He died in Grasse, France, in 1995, at the age of 81.
