= Uwe Corsepius =

Secretary-General of the Council of the European Union
- In office 26 June 2011 – 1 July 2015
- Preceded by: Pierre de Boissieu
- Succeeded by: Jeppe Tranholm-Mikkelsen

Personal details
- Born: 9 August 1960 (age 66) Berlin, Germany
- Education: University of Erlangen-Nuremberg; University of Kiel

Uwe Corsepius (born 9 August 1960) is a German diplomat, and former Secretary-General of the Council of the European Union. He was succeeded by Jeppe Tranholm-Mikkelsen.

== Early life and education ==
Uwe Corsepius was born in Berlin, Germany. In 1984 he earned a degree in economics from the University of Erlangen-Nuremberg. He is regarded as a disciple of the economist Horst Steinmann. He earned his doctorate at the Kiel Institute for the World Economy (Institut für Weltwirtschaft).

== Career ==
In 1990 Corsepius became a civil servant in the Federal Ministry of Economy and Labour. From 1992, he worked at the International Monetary Fund in Washington. From 1994 he was an official in the Federal Chancellery in Berlin, at first under Chancellor Helmut Kohl, then under successor Gerhard Schröder.

When Chancellor Angela Merkel assumed her office in November 2005, Corsepius was in charge of economic aspects of European integration and was negotiating the EU's 2007-13 budget. Shortly after, Merkel promoted him to replace Reinhard Silberberg as head of Department 5 (European Policy). Subsequently, Corsepius coordinated the German European policy between 2005 and 2011, including the preparations for Germany's presidency of the EU in the first half of 2007 as well as the drafting of the Berlin Declaration. From February 2011, he served as interim advisor on economic and financial policy and as G8 sherpa to Merkel, following his predecessor Jens Weidmann's move to become president of the Deutsche Bundesbank.

In late 2009, Corsepius was chosen by the Heads of state or Government (European Council) to become the new Secretary-General of the Council of the European Union for the period from 26 June 2011 to 30 June 2015. He succeeded to Frenchman Pierre de Boissieu in 2011. Catalogued as a "gruff" person, he is seen with critical eyes in Brussels, because he has "little understanding of the interests and needs of others". Given the fact that Klaus Welle, another German, is the Secretary General of the European Parliament, in 2011, two Germans were concurrently in the administration of the two EU legislative chambers. Corsepius's successor as a Director of European Affairs in the Chancellery was Nikolaus Meyer-Landrut.

In a 2015 reshuffle, Meyer-Landrut was made German Ambassador to France and Corsepius resumed his position as chief advisor on European affairs to Chancellor Merkel.

In 2015, news media reported that Corsepius was included in a Russian blacklist of prominent people from the European Union who are not allowed to enter the country.

Political offices
Preceded by Pierre de Boissieu	Secretary-General of the Council of the European Union; 2011–2015	Succeeded by Jeppe Tranholm-Mikkelsen
