= High Representative of the Union for Foreign Affairs and Security Policy =

Official of the European Union

(in other official languages)
Bulgarian	Върховен представител на Съюза по въпросите на външните работи и политиката на сигурност
Czech	Vysoký představitel Unie pro zahraniční a bezpečnostní politiku
Danish	Unionens højtstående repræsentant for udenrigsanliggender og sikkerhedspolitik
German	Hoher Vertreter der Union für die Außen- und Sicherheitspolitik
Greek	Ύπατος Εκπρόσωπος της Ένωσης για θέματα Εξωτερικής Πολιτικής και Πολιτικής Ασφαλείας
Spanish	Alto Representante de la Unión para Asuntos Exteriores y Política de Seguridad
Estonian	Liidu välisasjade ja julgeolekupoliitika kõrge esindaja
Finnish	Unionin ulkoasioiden ja turvallisuuspolitiikan korkea edustaja
French	Haut représentant de l’Union pour les affaires étrangères et la politique de sécurité
Irish	Ardionadaí an Aontais do Ghnóthaí Eachtracha agus don Beartas Slándála
Croatian	Visoki predstavnik Unije za vanjske poslove i sigurnosnu politiku
Hungarian	Az Unió külügyi és biztonságpolitikai főképviselője
Italian	Alto rappresentante dell’Unione per gli affari esteri e la politica di sicurezza
Lithuanian	Sąjungos vyriausiasis įgaliotinis užsienio reikalams ir saugumo politikai
Latvian	Savienības Augstais pārstāvis ārlietās un drošības politikas jautājumos
Maltese	Ir-Rappreżentant Għoli tal-Unjoni għall-Affarijiet Barranin u l-Politika ta’ Sigurtà
Dutch	Hoge vertegenwoordiger van de Unie voor buitenlandse zaken en veiligheidsbeleid
Polish	Wysoki Przedstawiciel Unii do Spraw Zagranicznych i Polityki Bezpieczeństwa
Portuguese	Alto Representante da União para os Negócios Estrangeiros e a Política de Segurança
Romanian	Înaltul Reprezentant al Uniunii pentru afaceri externe și politica de securitate
Slovak	Vysoký predstaviteľ Únie pre zahraničné veci a bezpečnostnú politiku
Slovene	Visok predstavnik Unije za zunanje zadeve in varnostno politiko
Swedish	Unionens höga representant för utrikesfrågor och säkerhetspolitik
- Emblem of the EEAS

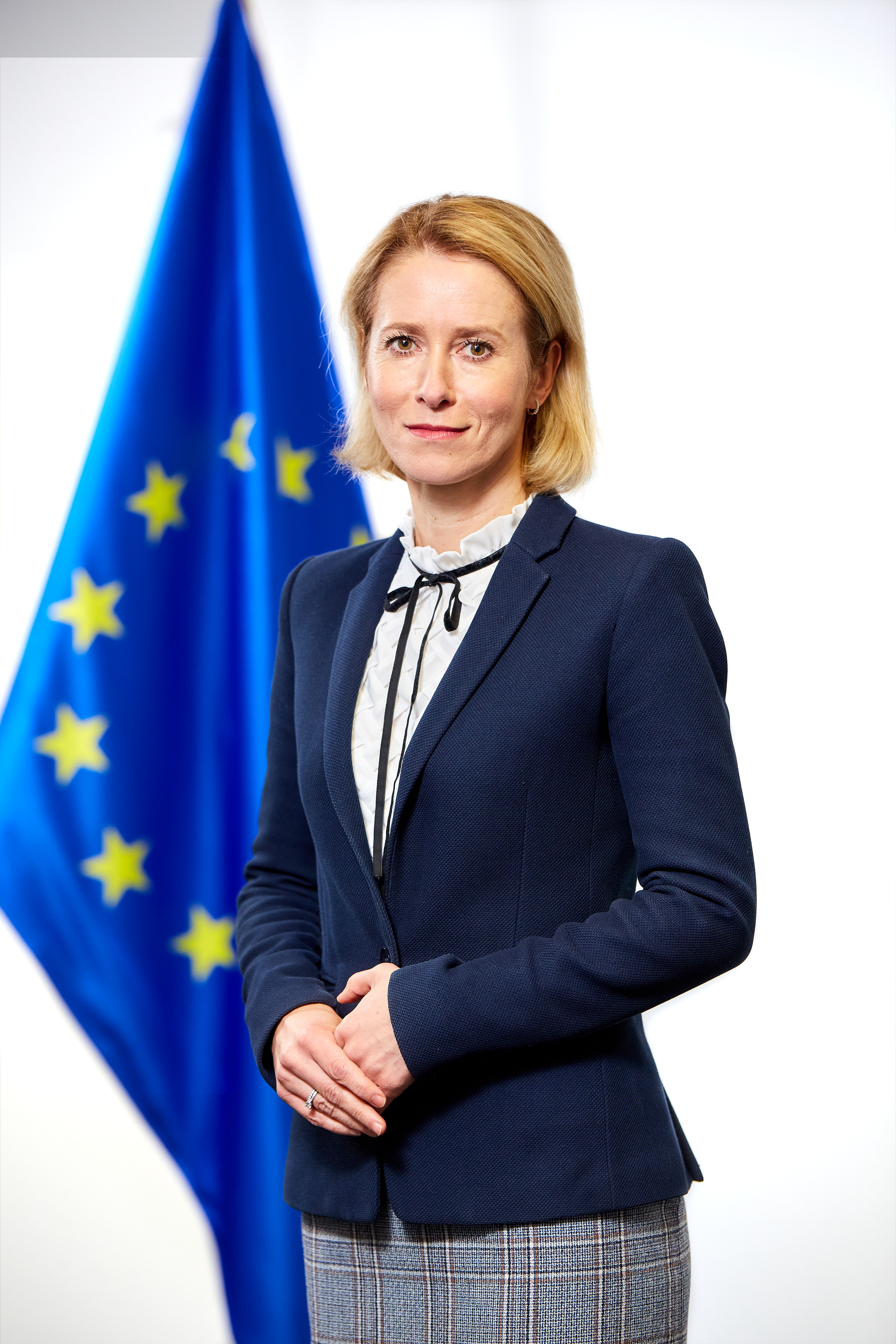
- Incumbent; Kaja Kallas since 1 December 2024
- European External Action Service; European Commission
- Abbreviation: HR; HR/VP (Note: Reflecting the vice presidency of the Commission)
- Member of: European Commission
- Reports to: President of the European Commission
- Appointer: The European Council with the consent of the President of the European Commission
- Term length: 5 years
- Formation: 1999 (CFSP); 2009 (FASP)
- First holder: Jürgen Trumpf (CFSP); Catherine Ashton (FASP)
- Deputy: Presidency foreign minister
- Salary: €288,877
- Website: Council, Commission

The high representative of the union for foreign affairs and security policy/vice-president of the European Commission (HR/VP) (Note: Reflecting the vice presidency of the Commission) is the chief co-ordinator and representative of the Common Foreign and Security Policy (CFSP) within the European Union (EU). The position is currently held by Kaja Kallas.

The Treaty of Amsterdam, signed in 1997 and entered into force in 1999, had established the position of High Representative for Common Foreign and Security Policy. The position's purview was augmented by the Treaty of Lisbon, signed in 2007 and entered into force in 2009, which established its current title and authorities, including a seat on the European Commission as Vice-President and the chair of the council of EU foreign ministers. The first person to hold the full title of High Representative of the Union for Foreign Affairs and Security Policy, inaugurated upon the coming into force of the Treaty of Lisbon, was Catherine Ashton. Early in the first term of the post, the office holder became assisted by the European External Action Service (EEAS) that was set up in December 2010.

== Titles ==
The formal title of the high representative is "High Representative of the Union for Foreign Affairs and Security Policy". This post was previously styled as the high representative of the common foreign and security policy and, under the European Constitution, had been designated to be titled the union minister for Foreign Affairs'. Colloquially sometimes referred to as the EU foreign (policy) chief or the European foreign minister. The style High Representative equates to that of high commissioner in diplomatic circles. Since the high representative is ex officio a vice-president of the European Commission, the office-holder is sometimes referred to as the HR/VP.

== Role ==
Where foreign matters are agreed between EU member states, the high representative can speak for the EU in that area, such as negotiating on behalf of the member states. The Representative co-ordinates the work of the European Union Special Representatives as well as other appointments such as anti-terrorist co-ordinator.

Beside representing the EU at international fora and co-ordinating the Common Foreign and Security Policy and the Common Security and Defence Policy, the high representative is:

- ex-officio vice-president of the European Commission
- participant in the meetings of the European Council
- responsible of the European Union Special Representatives
- head of the External Action Service and the delegations
- President of the Foreign Affairs Council
- Secretary-general of the Western European Union (prior to the abolition of the WEU on 30 June 2011)
- Head of the European Defence Agency
- Chairperson of the board of the European Union Institute for Security Studies

According to proposals made in 2009 by the Swedish EU presidency, the high representative will control the staffing and budget of the EEAS, and propose the size of budget to be allocated. The high representative is responsible for appointing EEAS staff and for controlling general foreign policy (outside of trade, development and enlargement which has to be made together with the commission) including security initiatives and intelligence sharing. However, although the high representative may prepare initiatives, decisions will still have to be taken by the member states in Council. The high representative would also have to report to Parliament.

With the growth in role of the high representative, and their exclusion from the European Council, the national foreign ministers are now uncertain of their role compared with that of the high representative. At an informal meeting in Finland it was mooted that they could serve as special envoys on the high representative's behalf. This has been backed by Ashton who said that so long as the EU spoke with one voice, it did not matter who was speaking.

== History ==
The post was introduced under the Treaty of Amsterdam. The treaty stated that the secretary-general of the Council of the European Union should have "the function of the High Representative for the common foreign and security policy." Thus, Javier Solana became the first permanent high representative. Initially the post was much more limited in scope than the present one created in 2009 by the Treaty of Lisbon.

=== Treaty of Lisbon ===
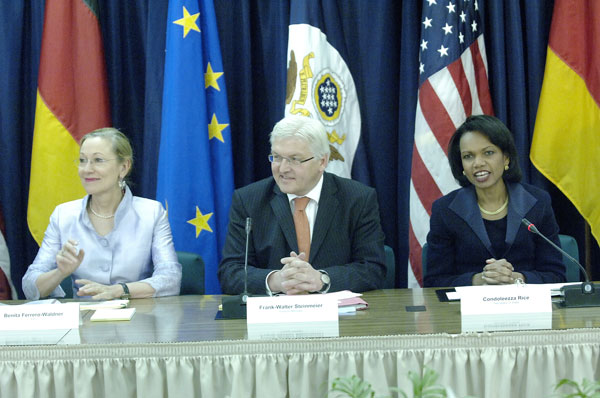
The External Relations Commissioner Benita Ferrero Waldner, left, with Frank-Walter Steinmeier and Condoleezza Rice, in 2007 was merged with the high representative under the Treaty of Lisbon.

The European Constitution proposed to merge the European Commissioner for External Relations with the high representative to create a Union Minister for Foreign Affairs and Security Policy. Although the Constitution failed to be ratified, its replacement, the Treaty of Lisbon, retained the change under a different name. The new high representative of the union for foreign affairs and security policy would still merge the External Relations Commissioner with the high representative and, like the Constitution, would have it backed up by an External Action Service. The new role also took over other foreign affairs roles, such as chairing the Foreign Affairs Council and representing the EU in international fora, roles which were previously exercised by the foreign minister of the country holding the presidency of the European Union (along with the foreign minister of the country previously holding the presidency and the one to take it next).

Despite the name change, many parts of the media still referred to it as a foreign minister and in negotiations it was decided that the high representative would no longer also be the council's secretary-general but would be a vice-president of the European Commission, filling the now merged Commission post. The merger of the two posts has been seen as furthering the answer to Kissinger's question:

The creation of a High Representative for foreign policy, or, better still, a Minister for foreign affairs would be a big change compared with the current situation. It would put an end to the double job which exists between the current function of Mr Javier Solana, and that carried out within the Commission by Mme Benita Ferrero-Waldner, in charge of the external aid of the EU. One and the same person would therefore deal with problems and respond to the famous telephone calls of Henry Kissinger: ‘ I want to speak to Europe.' "

— Valéry Giscard d'Estaing in his blog, 5 July 2007

== Appointments ==
The high representative is appointed by the European Council acting by qualified majority. However, in order to take up their role in the commission, in particular as a vice-president, the high representative has to appear before Parliament for questioning and then be subject to Parliament's vote of approval on the proposed Commission.

The basic monthly salary of the high representative is fixed at 130% (higher than a vice-president but less than the Commission President) of the highest grade of the EU civil service (grade 16, step 3), which works out at €23,006.98. There are other allowances on top of that as all other conditions of employment for the high representative are aligned to that of the commission.

No.	Portrait	Name (Born-Died)	Term			Party		Commission	Member state
No.	Portrait	Name (Born-Died)	Took office	Left office	Duration	European	National	Commission	Member state
As High Representative for Common Foreign and Security Policy – Secretary-General of the Council of the EU
–		Jürgen Trumpf (1931–2023)	1 May 1999 (Note: Appointment as High Representative, appointed Secretary-General of the Council in 1994.)	18 October 1999	170 days	Independent	Independent	N/A	Germany
–		Javier Solana (born 1942)	18 October 1999	1 December 2009	10 years, 44 days	PES	PSOE	N/A	Spain
As High Representative of the Union for Foreign Affairs and Security Policy – Vice-President of the European Commission
1		Catherine Ashton (born 1956)	1 December 2009	1 November 2014	4 years, 335 days	PES	Labour	Barroso II	United Kingdom
2		Federica Mogherini (born 1973)	1 November 2014 (Note: Michel Barnier, to advise EUHRVP Mogherini on important defence and security issues.)	30 November 2019	5 years, 29 days	PES	PD	Juncker	Italy
3		Josep Borrell (born 1947)	1 December 2019	30 November 2024	4 years, 365 days	PES	PSOE	Von der Leyen I	Spain
4		Kaja Kallas (born 1977)	1 December 2024	Incumbent	1 year, 350 days	RE	REF	Von der Leyen II	Estonia

=== Javier Solana Madariaga (1999–2009) ===
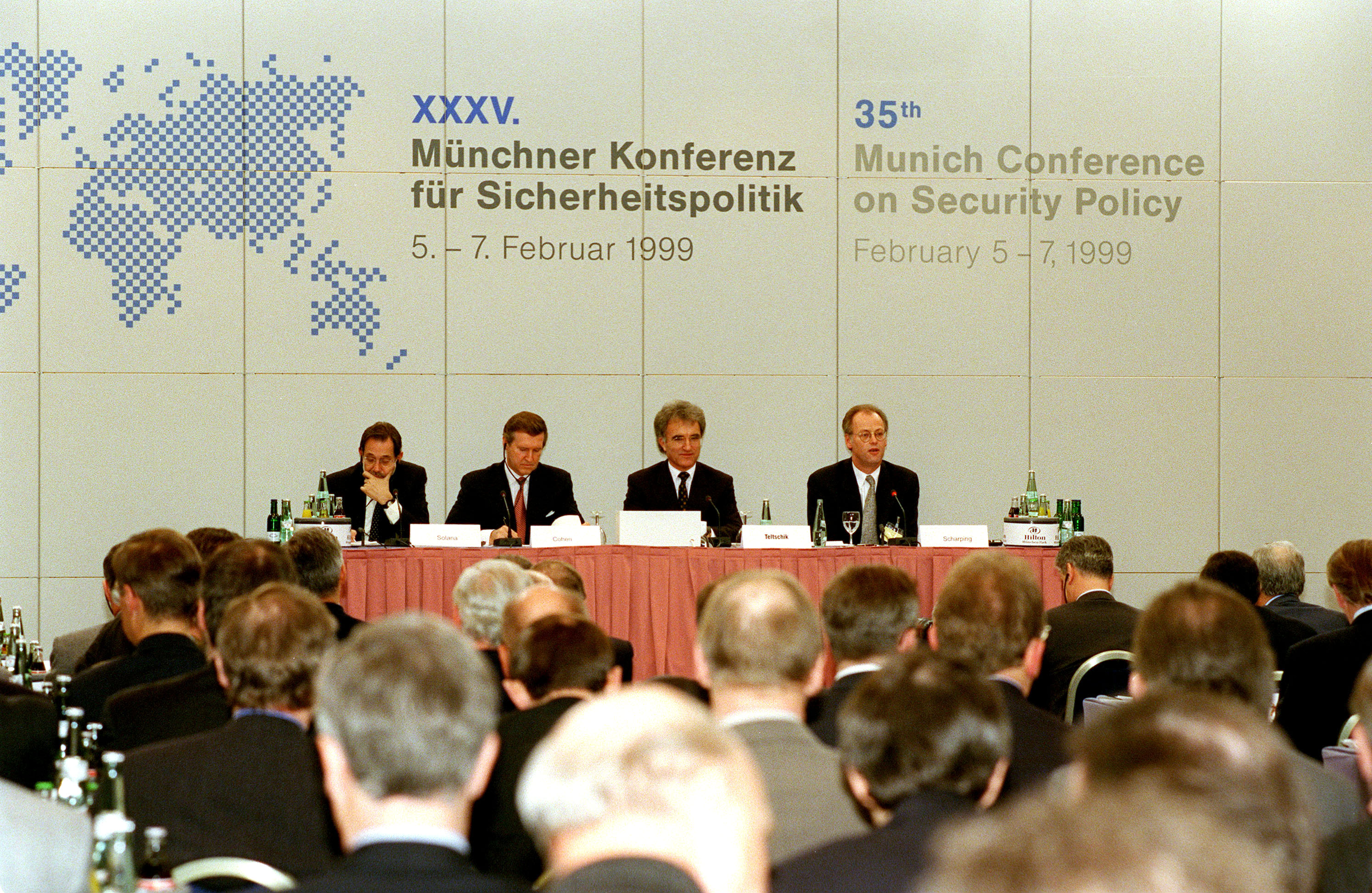
Javier Solana at the 35th Munich Conference on Security Policy in 1999

The Amsterdam Treaty introduced the post of High Representative of the Common Foreign and Security Policy to represent the EU on the world stage. It was decided that the Secretary-General of the Council would be the high representative. This meant that the secretary-general at the time, Jürgen Trumpf, was the first high representative, although he only served for a few months.

The first permanent high representative was Javier Solana Madariaga, former Secretary General of NATO. He was appointed on 4 July 1999 at the Cologne European Council as Council Secretary-General and high representative. He took up the post on 18 October 1999, shortly after standing down from NATO. The post had a budget of €40 million, most of which goes to Balkan operations. During his tenure, the position was expanded rapidly, with several more functions combined into the function of high representative. From 25 November 1999 he was also appointed Secretary-General of the Western European Union (WEU), overseeing the transfer of responsibilities from that organisation to the Common Foreign and Security Policy (CFSP). In 2004, his five-year mandate was renewed; he also became president of the European Defence Agency for the duration of his second term.

The Clinton administration claimed in May 2000 that Solana was the fulfilment of Henry Kissinger's famous desire to have a phone number to talk to Europe. In December 2003 Solana released the European Security Strategy, which sets out the main priorities and identifies the main threats to the security of the EU, including terrorism. On 25 March 2004, Solana appointed Gijs de Vries as the anti-terrorist co-ordinator for the CFSP, and outlined de Vries's duties as being to streamline, organise and co-ordinate the EU's fight against terrorism.

He has negotiated numerous Treaties of Association between the European Union and various Middle Eastern and Latin American countries, including Bolivia and Colombia. Solana played a pivotal role in unifying the remainder of the former Yugoslavian federation. He proposed that Montenegro form a union with Serbia instead of having full independence, stating that this was done to avoid a domino effect that might proceed from demands for independence by Kosovo and Vojvodina. Local media sarcastically named the new country "Solania".

On 21 January 2002, Solana said that the detainees at Guantanamo Bay should be treated as prisoners of war under the Geneva Convention. The EU has stated that it hopes to avoid another war like the Iraqi invasion through this and future negotiations, and Solana has said the most difficult moments of his job were when the United Kingdom and France, the two permanent EU Security Council members, were in disagreement. The so-called Vilnius letter, a declaration of support by eastern European countries for the United States' aim of régime change in Iraq, and the letter of the eight, a similar letter from the UK, Italy, and six second-tier countries, are generally seen as a low-water mark of the CFSP. Solana operated as a "quiet diplomat", and found himself frequently pushed to the side in negotiations and sent on missions known to be impossible.

Solana has played an important role working toward a resolution to the Israeli–Palestinian conflict, and continues to be a primary architect of the "Road map for Peace", along with the UN, Russia, and the United States in the Quartet on the Middle East. On 22 July 2004, he met Ariel Sharon in Israel. Sharon had originally refused to meet him, but eventually accepted that the EU was involved in the Road Map. Solana criticised Israel for obstructing the Palestinian presidential election of 9 January 2005, but then met Sharon again on 13 January.

In November 2004 he assisted the United Kingdom, France and Germany in negotiating a nuclear material enrichment freeze with Iran. In the same month he was involved in mediating between the two presidential candidates in the post-election developments in Ukraine, and on 21 January 2005 he invited Ukraine's new President Viktor Yushchenko to discuss future EU membership.

=== Catherine Ashton (2009–2014) ===
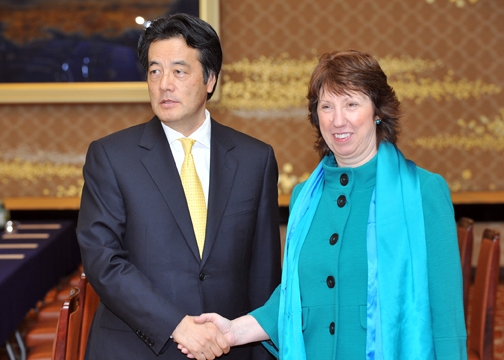
Ashton with Katsuya Okada in 2009

Although Solana was originally selected to be the first Foreign Minister, the delays in introducing the post meant that after 10 years of service he stood aside for a new candidate. After numerous candidates were put forward, EU leaders agreed on Catherine Ashton from the United Kingdom as the first merged high representative. Ashton was previously the European Commissioner for Trade and otherwise had no foreign affairs experience. Ashton unexpectedly came to the top of the shortlist when she was nominated unanimously by the centre-left leaders who claimed the post. Ashton was confirmed by the European Parliament before she took up the post. In the same European Council meeting, Pierre de Boissieu was appointed Secretary-General of the Council of the European Union, showing that the high representative and the Secretary-General will no longer be the same person.

In October 2010 most major appointments to the EEAS were made, including Pierre Vimont (France) as Secretary General, Helga Schmid (Germany) and Maciej Popowski (Poland) as Deputy Secretaries General and David O'Sullivan (Ireland) as chief operating officer. Slowly other staff and ambassadors were appointed in cycles. Ashton formally launched the EEAS on 1 December 2010 at a low key event where she outlined her key priorities as relations with the US and China, climate change, poverty eradication, crisis management and counter-terrorism.

Following the 2010 Haiti earthquake, Ashton chaired a meeting of the foreign relations, development and environment DGs and experts from the Council and the Situation Centre (the EU intelligence-gathering agency). There they agreed on €3 million in aid, to look for further financial assistance, to send personnel to assess the situation and to co-ordinate pledges from member states. Ashton then chaired a meeting of member states' ambassadors and acted as a general co-ordinator; for example contacts from the UN went via Ashton. Although she refused to describe it as the first act of the external action service, Ashton did emphasise that it was the first time that such a co-ordination between all the various EU foreign policy actors had been accomplished before. Spain, which held the rotating Council presidency that would have taken charge before the Treaty of Lisbon, took a back seat though assisted, for example by offering use of the Spanish base in Panama. However, the majority of aid relief was dealt with bilaterally between Haiti and individual member states and Ashton was criticised afterward for being one of the few foreign representatives not to travel to Haiti personally. Despite EU ministers then agreeing to deploy European gendarmes, criticism was levied at Ashton for failing to improve the EU's international profile during the crisis. Ashton responded thus: "There's been a recognition from the people of Haiti, the US, the UN and others of the extremely important role the EU has played. On the main issue, we should ask, have we tried to save lives, to support the people of Haiti? Yes we have."

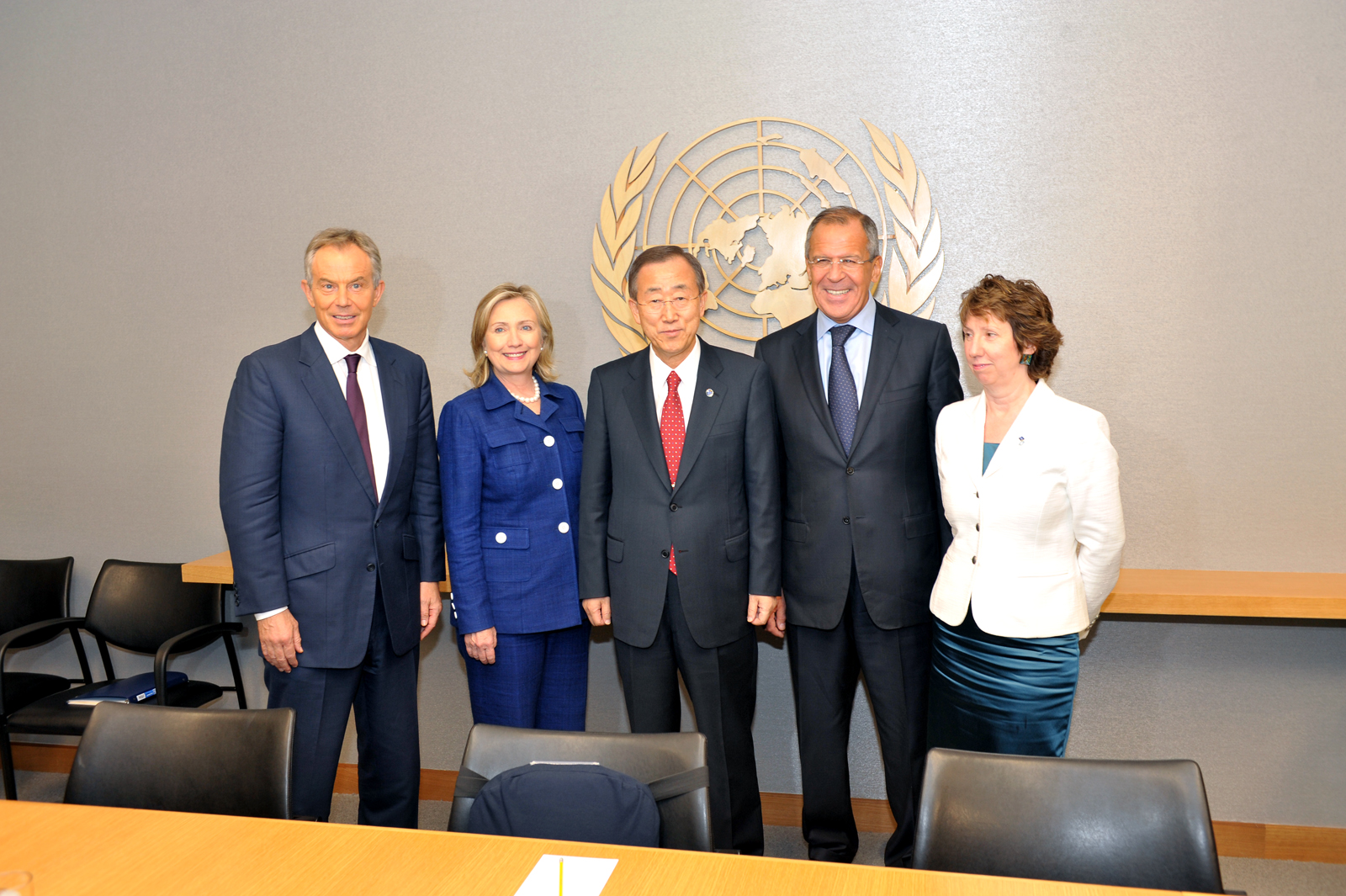
Catherine Ashton (far right) with the rest of the Quartet on the Middle East (2010)

Criticism continued to mount, including complaints that she skipped a defence meeting to attend the inauguration of Ukraine's Prime Minister alleged bias towards British officials, lack of language skills and risking a UK-French feud over creating an EU military planning headquarters. She has been defended by some, including Commissioner Günther Oettinger, on the ground that she has had to take on a job that combines three previous jobs and is working on establishing the EEAS so she is unable to take on everything at once, nor please everyone. Despite early Spanish assistance during 2010, Ashton did find herself competing with the Spanish foreign minister on who was going to be speaking for the EU and the need to find consensus between the member states and institutions pushed back the expected operational date of the EEAS from spring 2010 to December 2010. In contrast to the Spanish position, in 2011 Polish foreign minister Radek Sikorski said he would act as Ashton's "loyal deputy".

Secretary General Pierre Vimont joined those defending Ashton from criticism; praising her work in opening the EEAS office in Benghazi, Libya as making the EEAS very popular in Libya. He also supported her over Syria and has asked her to stand for a second term. Polish Minister for Europe, Mikołaj Dowgielewicz, also stated criticism against Ashton was "a lot of hot air" and that "she has an impossible job to do and she is doing it well. At the end of her time in office, people will be more positive about what she has done. She will leave a real legacy."

However, Former European Commission adviser Dr Fraser Cameron argued that "the criticism one hears of Ashton is pretty strong and it will be difficult to overcome the bad press she has. It represents a problem for the EEAS, when it comes to public diplomacy, and reflects the system we have for choosing leaders. Too often, the EEAS is waiting until the last member state signs up to the position; they could set out a view much earlier. When you look at places like Egypt – Cathy has been five times, but people are still not quite sure what the EEAS does or who speaks for Europe. The glass is less than half full. I think the criticism of Ashton is down to style and morale in the EEAS is not as good as it should be."

Ashton chaired the meetings between the E3/EU+3 (P5+1 countries and the EU) and Iran in Geneva, which led to an interim agreement on 24 November 2013, and the Joint Plan of Action.

The tone of public comment on Aston's performance in office was subsequently to be influenced especially by her contributions to negotiations over Kosovo and the normalisation of its relationship with Serbia, and over Iran over its nuclear program. In October 2013, Der Spiegel wrote of her:

But now the 57-year-old baroness is suddenly at the center of world diplomacy. And whenever she is mentioned, she earns praise for her hard-nosed negotiating skills, her stamina and her diplomatic talents. It is said that U.S. Secretary of State John Kerry has much faith in her. "She is discrete and perceptive, but also tenacious. That makes her an ideal negotiator", says Alexander Graf Lamsdorff, the head of Germany's business-friendly Free Democratic Party (FDP) in the European Parliament and a member of its Committee on Foreign Affairs.

After the November 2013 negotiation of an interim agreement with Iran over its nuclear program,. the Financial Times wrote that Ashton was "no longer the diplomatic dilettante". A senior French diplomat was quoted as saying, "I tip my hat to her.... She truly played a decisive role". The report continued that, after initially insisting on negotiating only with other foreign ministers, by the latter stages of the negotiations the Iranian foreign minister Mohammad Javad Zarif "now... wanted to deal only with Lady Ashton". Said a western diplomat, "That the others agreed to this was significant. For China and Russia to be outside while she was in the room negotiating details was quite remarkable".

=== Federica Mogherini (2014–2019) ===
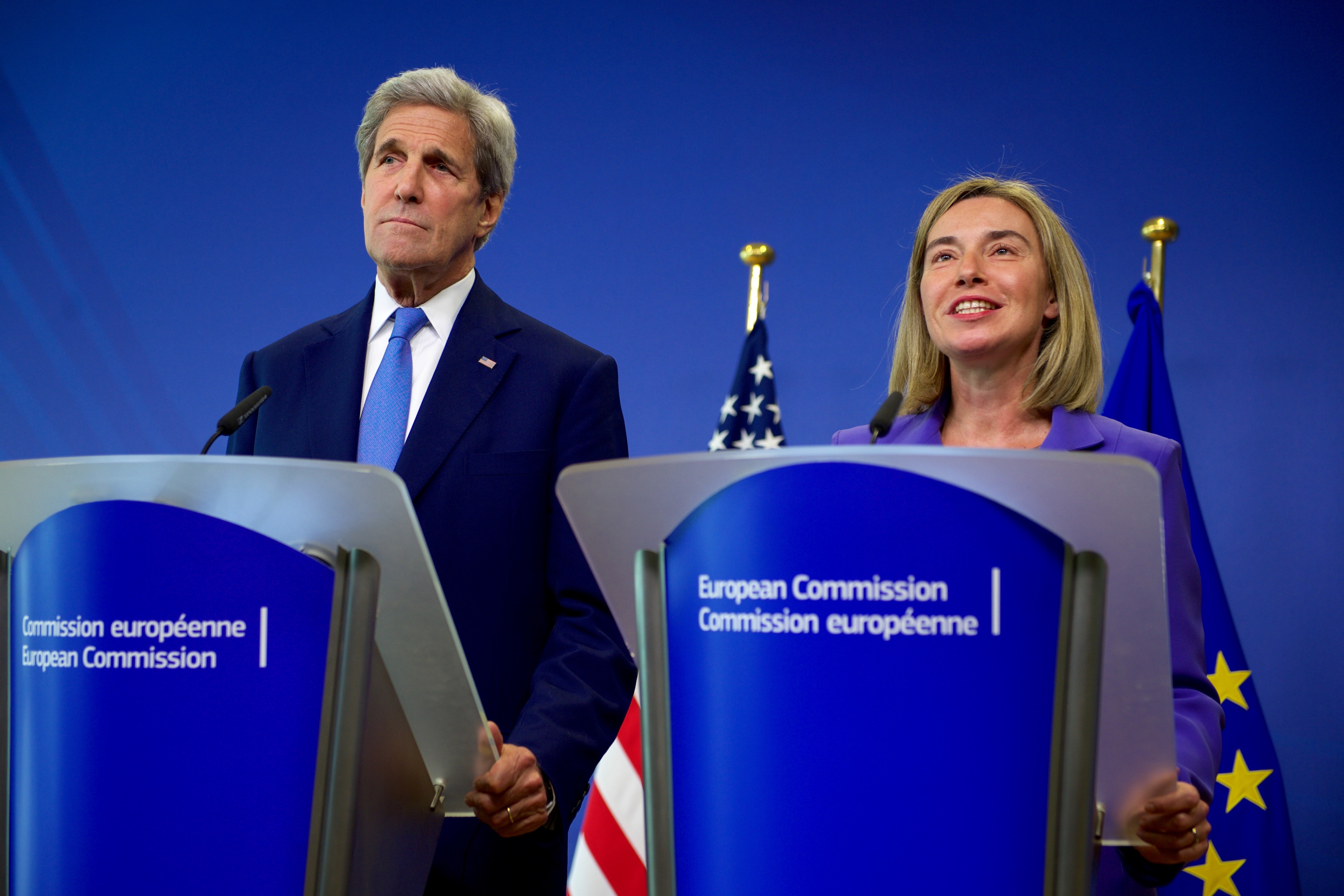
Mogherini with John Kerry in 2016

In July 2014, given the large number of Italian MEPs belonging to the S&D group following the 2014 election, the European Council considered her as a candidate for the position of High Representative, in Jean-Claude Juncker's new European Commission. On 13 July 2014, the Financial Times among other European newspapers reported that her nomination proposal had been opposed by some eastern European countries, including Latvia, Estonia, Lithuania and Poland, where her stance towards Russia concerning the Russo-Ukrainian war was considered to be too soft. Nonetheless, on 2 August 2014, Italian Prime Minister Matteo Renzi formally nominated her by letter to EC President-elect Jean-Claude Juncker, as Italy's official candidate for EU Commissioner. On 30 August, Europe's socialist Prime Ministers met prior to the convening of the European Council, at which she received the approval of the Party of European Socialists. On the same day the President Herman Van Rompuy announced that the European Council had decided to appoint the Italian Minister as its new high representative, effective from 1 November 2014.

At her first press conference, she declared that her efforts would be devoted to establishing discussions between Russia and Ukraine to solve the crisis between the two countries.

In 2015, Mogherini won praise for her role in negotiating the Joint Comprehensive Plan of Action, an international agreement on the nuclear program of Iran, and along with Iranian Foreign Minister Mohammad Javad Zarif was the one to announce the accord to the world.

In February 2015, the President of the European Commission Jean-Claude Juncker appointed Michel Barnier, the former EU Internal Market Commissioner, as his special advisor on defence and security. Juncker stated that Barnier's role will be to advise the European Commission and particularly the EUHRVP Federica Mogherini on important defence and security issues. Barnier's appointment came on the heels of the nomination of senior French diplomat Alain Le Roy as the new Secretary General of the European External Action Service (EEAS or EAS).

=== Josep Borrell Fontelles (2019–2024) ===
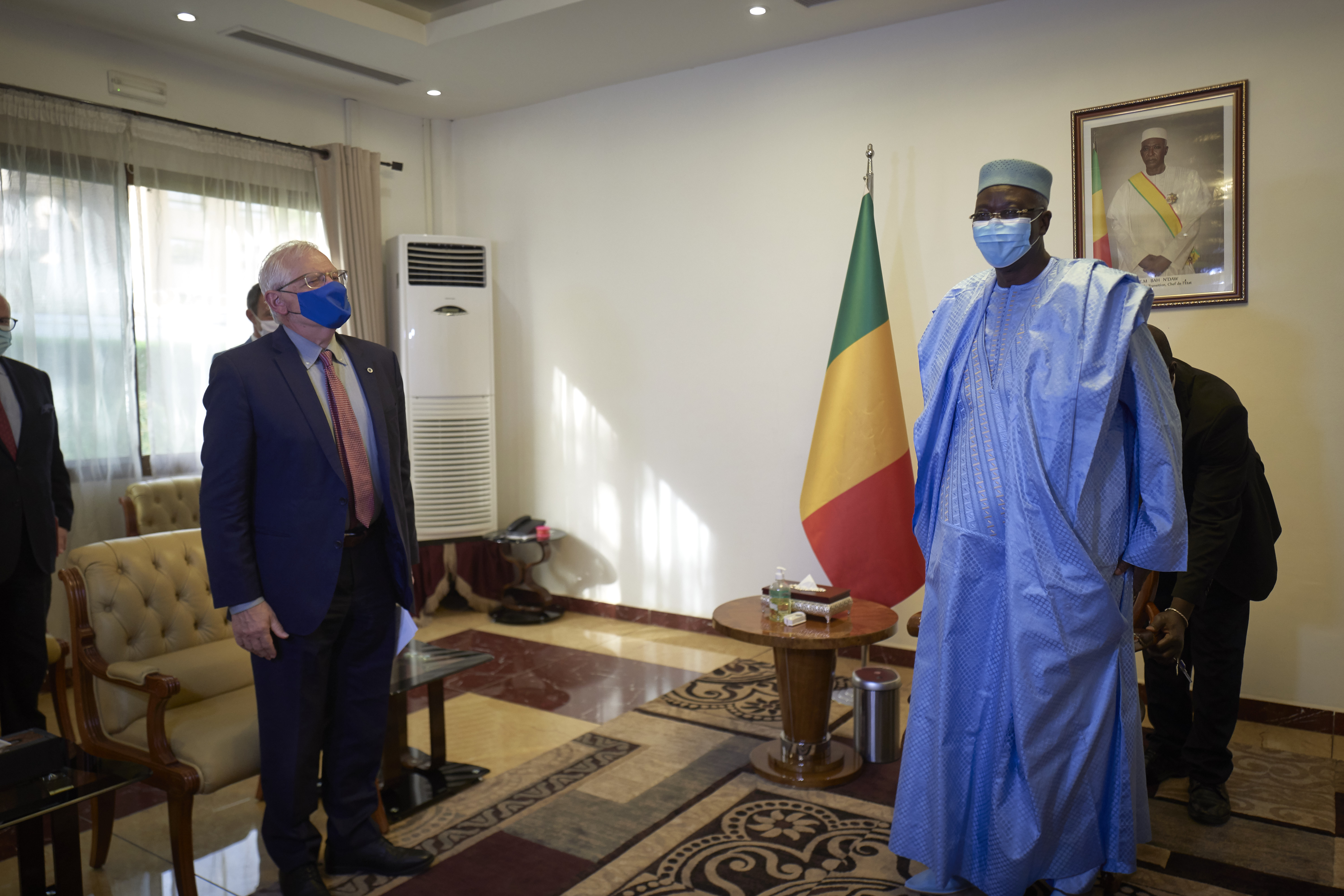
Borrell with Bah N'Daw in 2021

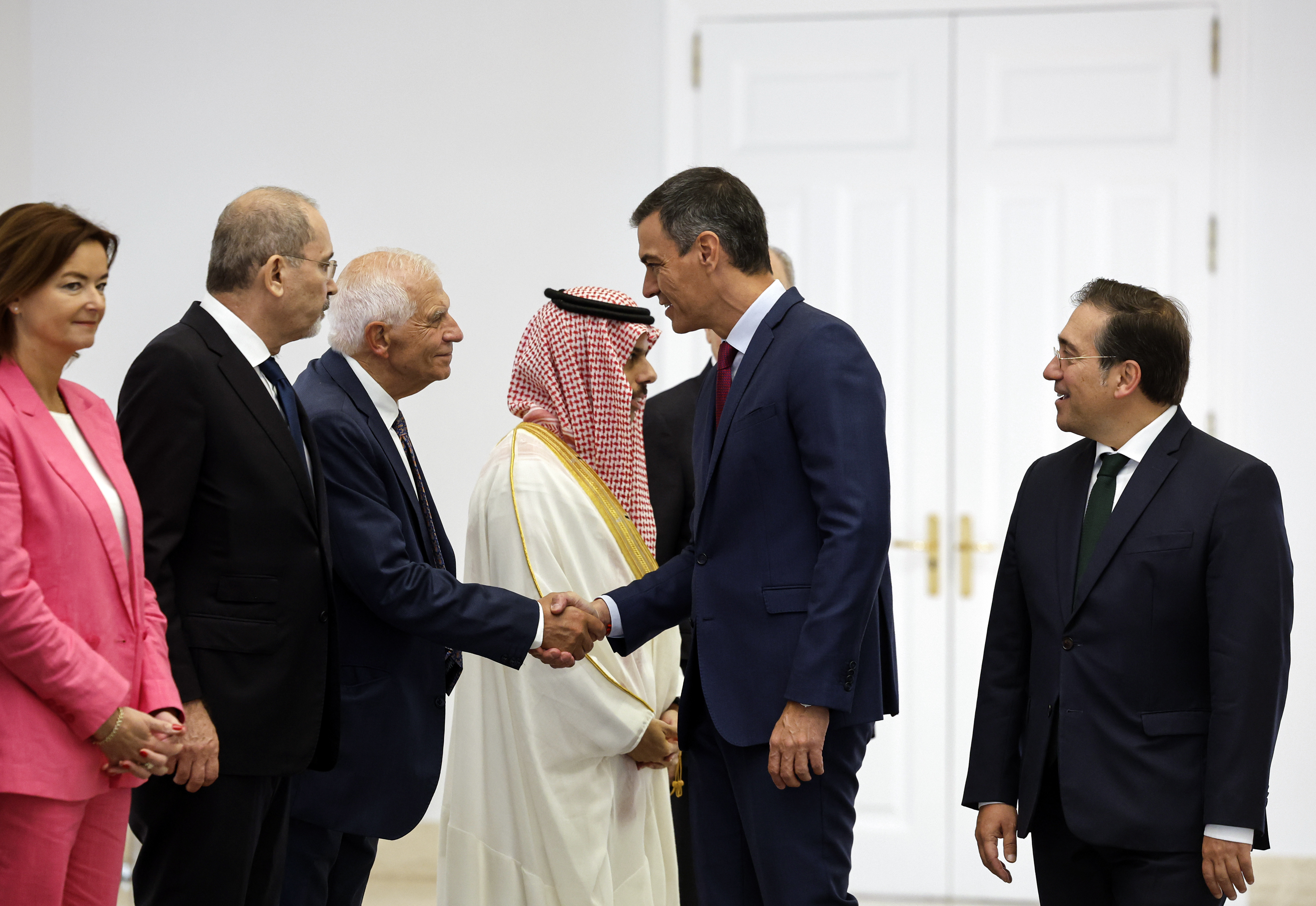
Borrell at the Madrid meeting focusing on the implementation of the Two State solution

In 2020, EU Development Ministers have launched the Team Europe aid package to support partner countries to address the pandemic and its economic consequences by providing an overall financial support of over €20 billion.

In the wake of the 18 February 2022 Russian declaration on L/DPR (the self-proclaimed Luhansk People's Republic and Donetsk People's Republic), High Representative Borrell warned Moscow to return to the tenets of the Minsk agreements, to the discussions within the Normandy Format and the Trilateral Contact Group, which respect the borders of Ukraine.

With the development of the Gaza war, Borrell has been repeatedly critical of Israel actions, calling the country's siege of Gaza illegal and dismissing its evacuation orders as unrealistic. As European Union High Representative for Foreign Affairs and Security Policy, he condemned the "barbaric and terrorist attack" by Hamas on Israel which started the 2023 Gaza war. On 10 October 2023, Borrell accused Israel of breaking international law by imposing a total blockade of the Gaza Strip. On 3 January 2024, he condemned the comments of the Israeli ministers Itamar Ben-Gvir and Bezalel Smotrich, writing, "Forced displacements are strictly prohibited as a grave violation of [international humanitarian law] & words matter." On 29 January 2024, Borrell told UN Secretary-General António Guterres that funding toward UNRWA has not been suspended and the EU will determine funding decisions after the investigation. Borrell stated, "We shouldn’t let allegations cloud UNRWA’s indispensable and great work." In March 2024, Borrell said Israel's depriving food from Palestinians was a serious violation of international humanitarian law, and described the Al-Rashid humanitarian aid incident as "totally unacceptable carnage". Following the International Court of Justice advisory opinion on Israel's occupation of the Palestinian territories, Borrell stated that international law is 'binding', and called for the EU foreign ministers "to move on from words to deeds" regarding Israel's failure to comply with international legality in Gaza and the West Bank.

=== Kaja Kallas (2024–present) ===
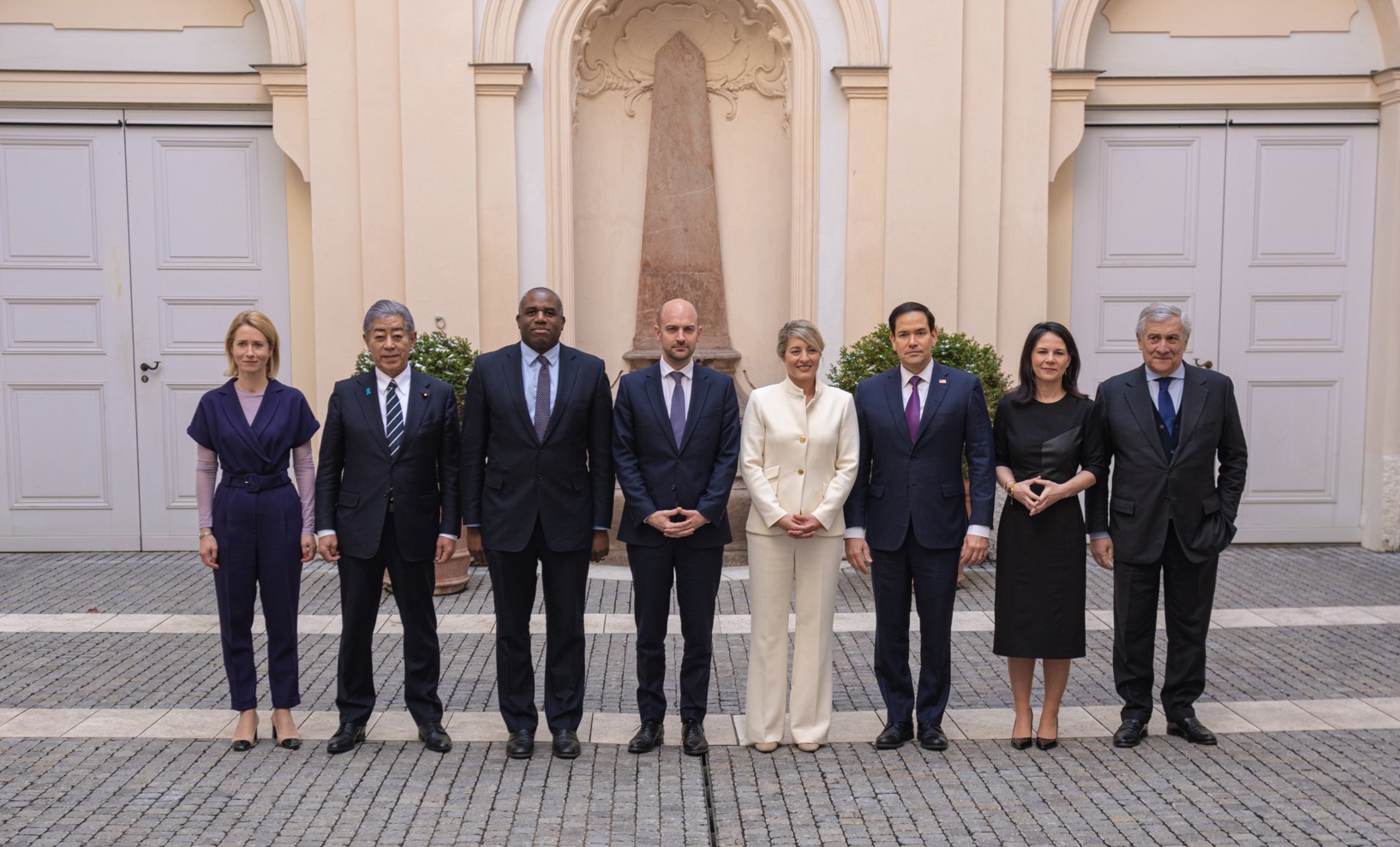
Kallas (far left) at a G7 Ministerial Meeting in Munich

On 1 December 2024, her first day in office as High Representative, Kallas visited Ukraine along with European Council President Antonio Costa and Enlargement Commissioner Marta Kos, expressing strong support for a Ukrainian victory by stating that "the European Union wants Ukraine to win this war". The trip was criticized by Slovak Prime Minister Robert Fico, who stated, without further elaboration, that Kallas and Costa made statements not agreed upon by EU bodies. On the same day, Kallas also warned the Georgian government against using violence to suppress ongoing protests over the ruling party's decision to postpone EU accession talks, threatening sanctions.

== Treaty basis ==
The Treaty on European Union, as amended by the Treaty of Lisbon, provides in Article 15(2):

The European Council shall consist of the Heads of State or Government of the Member States, together with its president and the President of the Commission. The High Representative of the Union for Foreign Affairs and Security Policy shall take part in its work.

and in Article 18:

# The European Council, acting by a qualified majority, with the agreement of the President of the Commission, shall appoint the High Representative of the Union for Foreign Affairs and Security Policy. The European Council may end his term of office by the same procedure.

1. The High Representative shall conduct the Union's common foreign and security policy. He shall contribute by his proposals to the development of that policy, which he shall carry out as mandated by the Council. The same shall apply to the common security and defence policy.
2. The High Representative shall preside over the Foreign Affairs Council.
3. The High Representative shall be one of the Vice-Presidents of the Commission. He shall ensure the consistency of the Union's external action. He shall be responsible within the Commission for responsibilities incumbent on it in external relations and for coordinating other aspects of the Union's external action. In exercising these responsibilities within the Commission, and only for these responsibilities, the High Representative shall be bound by Commission procedures to the extent that this is consistent with paragraphs 2 and 3.

— C 115/26 EN Official Journal of the European Union 9.5.2008

== See also ==
- Ambassadors of the European Union
- Common Foreign and Security Policy (CFSP)
  - Common Security and Defence Policy (CSDP)
- Council of the European Union
- European External Action Service (EEAS)
- European Union Military Committee
- European Union Special Representative
- Foreign Affairs Council
- Foreign relations of the European Union
- High Representative for Bosnia and Herzegovina
- Supreme Allied Commander Europe
