= Jürgen Trumpf =

German diplomat (1931–2023)

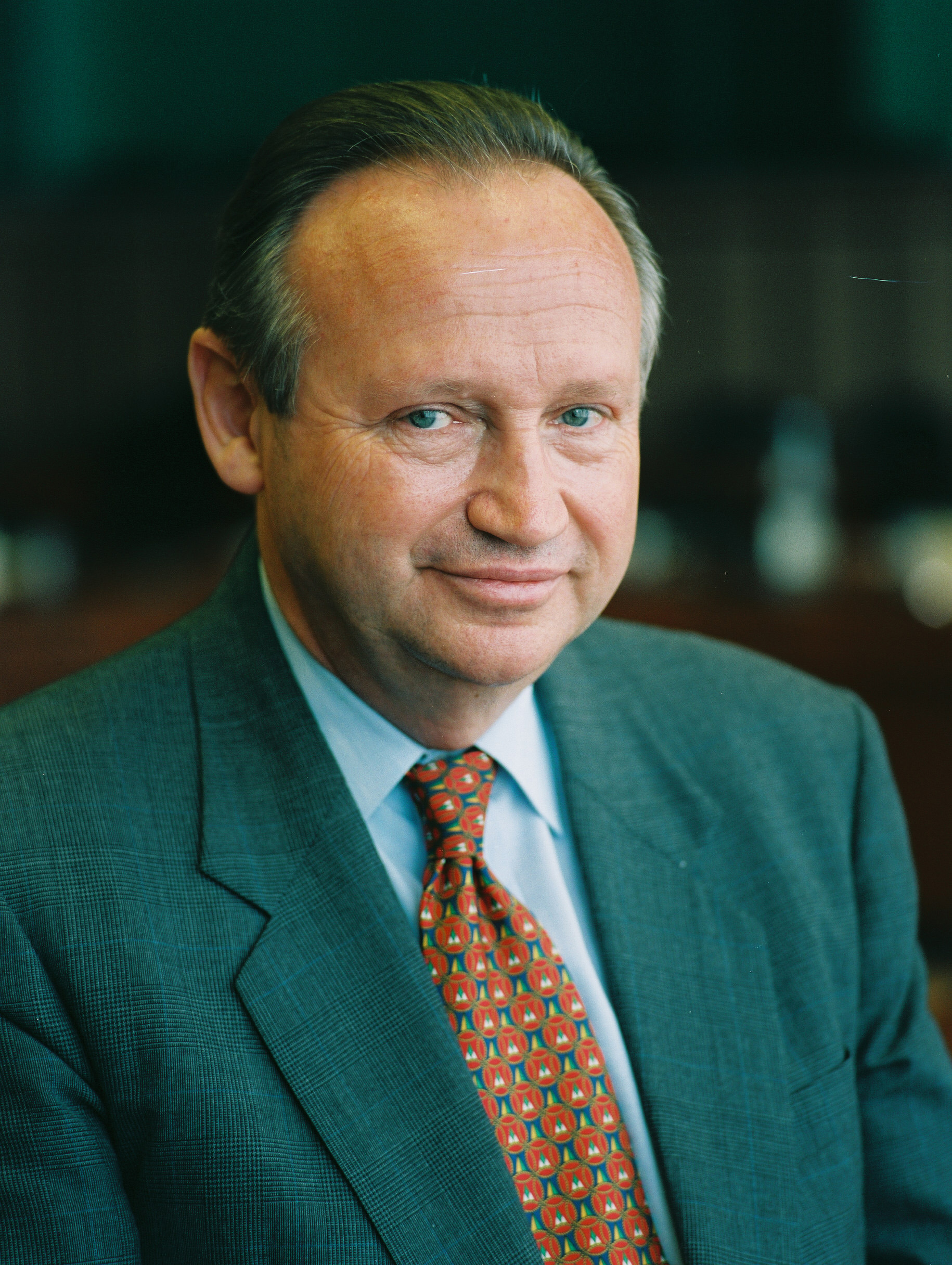
- Trumpf in 1996

High Representative for Common Foreign and Security Policy
- In office 1 May 1999 – 18 October 1999
- Preceded by: Position established
- Succeeded by: Javier Solana

Secretary General of the Council of the European Union
- In office 1 September 1994 – 18 October 1999
- Preceded by: Niels Ersbøll
- Succeeded by: Javier Solana

Personal details
- Born: 8 July 1931 Düsseldorf, Rhine Province, Prussia, Germany
- Died: 13 May 2023 (aged 91) Bonn, North Rhine-Westphalia, Germany
- Education: University of Innsbruck

Jürgen Trumpf (8 July 1931 – 13 May 2023) was a German diplomat and politician. He was appointed Secretary-General for the Council of the European Union and held the office from 1 September 1994 to 17 October 1999.

When the Amsterdam Treaty came into force, he briefly became the first High Representative for Common Foreign and Security Policy but a month later made way for Javier Solana at the Cologne European Summit.

Trumpf died on 13 May 2023, at the age of 91.

== Sources ==
- Jürgen Trumpf – European Navigator (Retrieved 2 January 2011)

Political offices
Preceded by Niels Ersbøll	Secretary General of the Council of the European Union; 1994–1999	Succeeded by Javier Solana
New office	High Representative for Common Foreign and Security Policy; 1999	Succeeded by Javier Solana
