= Niels Ersbøll =

Danish politician (1926–2026)

Secretary-General of the Council of the European Union
- In office 8 October 1980 – 31 August 1994
- Preceded by: Nicolas Hommel
- Succeeded by: Jürgen Trumpf

Personal details
- Born: Niels Erling Nygaard Ersbøll; 9 April 1926
- Died: 11 June 2026 (aged 100)
- Education: University of Copenhagen (Cand.jur.)
- Occupation: Diplomat

Niels Erling Nygaard Ersbøll (9 April 1926 – 11 June 2026) was a Danish politician. He served as Secretary-General of the Council of the European Union from 1980 to 1994.

Ersbøll died on 11 June 2026, at the age of 100.
