= President of the European Council =

Head of the European Council

- Emblem of European Council

- Flag of Europe

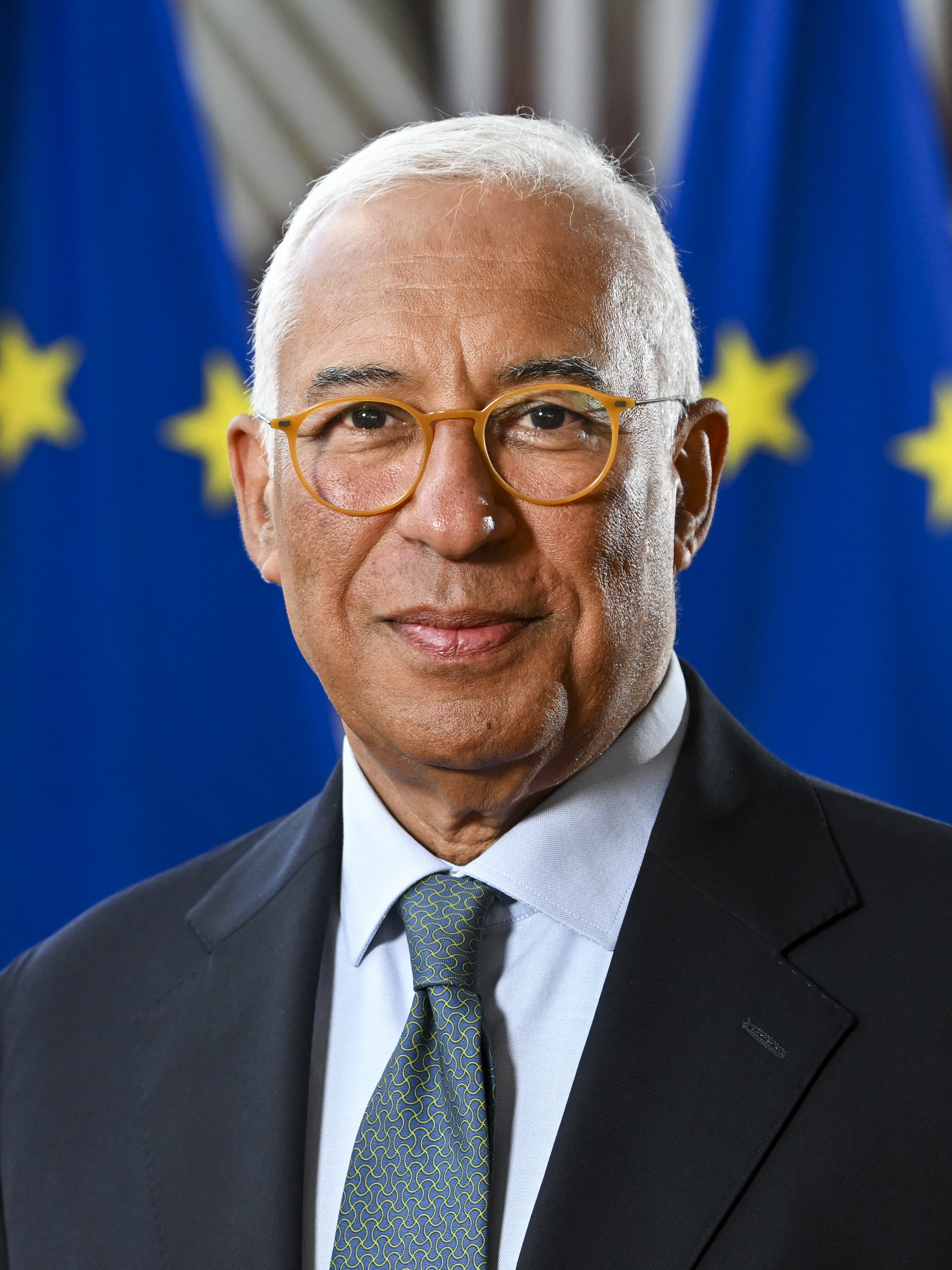
- Incumbent; António Costa since 1 December 2024
- European Council
- Style: President
- Status: Presiding and chief administrative officer
- Member of: European Council (non-voting)
- Residence: Europa building
- Seat: Brussels, Belgium
- Appointer: European Council; by qualified majority
- Term length: 2.5 years, renewable once
- Constituting instrument: Treaties of the European Union
- Precursor: Chairman of the European Council
- Formation: 1 December 2009
- First holder: Herman Van Rompuy
- Website: consilium.europa.eu

The president of the European Council is the person presiding over and driving forward the work of the European Council on the world stage. This institution comprises the college of heads of state or government of European Union (EU) member states as well as the president of the European Commission, and provides political direction to the EU.

From 1975 to 2009, the chair of the European Council was an unofficial position (often referred to as the president-in-office) held by the head of state or government of the member state holding the semiannually rotating presidency of the Council of the European Union at any given time. However, since the 2007 Treaty of Lisbon, article 15 of Treaty on European Union states that the European Council appoints a full-time president for a two-and-a-half-year term, with the possibility of renewal once. Appointments, as well as the removal of incumbents, require a double majority support in the European Council.

On 19 November 2009, the European Council agreed that its first president under the Lisbon Treaty would be Herman Van Rompuy (European People's Party), until then the Belgian prime minister. Van Rompuy took office when the Lisbon Treaty came into force on 1 December 2009 with a term stretching until 31 May 2012. His term was later extended with a second period ending on 30 November 2014.

The second holder of the office was (until then) Polish prime minister Donald Tusk. He was originally elected to serve a term from 1 December 2014 to 31 May 2017, and was re-elected on 9 March 2017 to a second term running from 1 June 2017 until 30 November 2019.

On 2 July 2019, the European Council elected the until then Belgian prime minister Charles Michel as the successor to Donald Tusk as the third President of the European Council, for the period from 1 December 2019 to 31 May 2022. He was re-elected in March 2022 for a second term for period from 1 June 2022 to 30 November 2024.

Effective 1 December 2024, Michel was replaced by António Costa, who had left office as Portuguese prime minister earlier the same year, becoming the fourth and latest President of the European Council.

== History ==
=== Early form ===
The first meeting of all European Communities heads of state or government was held in 1961 as an informal summit, but only became formalised in 1974, when it was dubbed "European Council" by the then French president Valéry Giscard d'Estaing. With the establishment of the European Union in 1993, the presidency of the European Council was based on the presidency of the Council of the European Union, being hosted by the member state holding the Council presidency, rotating every six months. As the European Council is composed of national leaders, it was chaired by the head of state or government of the presidency state.

=== Permanent post ===
The European Constitution, drafted by the European Convention, outlined the "president of the European Council" as a longer term and full-time chairmanship. The Constitution was rejected by voters in two Member States during ratification but the changes envisaged to the European Council presidency were retained in the Treaty of Lisbon, which came into force on 1 December 2009.

The first president was expected to define the role for future office holders, as there was no clear idea of how the post would evolve.

One body of thought was that the president would stick to a quasi-administrative role, a standard bearer who would simply chair meetings and ensure the smooth running of the body and its policies. This would attract semi-retired leaders seeking a fitting climax to their career and would leave most work to the Commission rather than wield power within the institutions.

Another opinion, however, envisaged a more pro-active President within the Union and speaking for it abroad. The office would hence be quickly fashioned, according to promoters, into a de facto "president of Europe" and, unlike the first model, would be seen on the world stage as speaking for the EU. Persons connected to this position would be more charismatic leaders. The appointment of Herman Van Rompuy indicated a desire to see the former style of president.

In any case, a number of practical reasons were suggested for having the new style President The previous rotating presidency meant a new chair every second or third meeting, with no choice as to who it would be. Incumbents had little time to devote to preparing meetings, as they had a national government to run (a growing problem as the number of members to negotiate with expanded with EU enlargement). Further, when representing the EU externally at G7 or G20 summits, they were often simultaneously representing their own country. Allowing the European Council to choose a full time, longer-term President who was not simultaneously a national head of government avoided these problems.

The Treaty of Lisbon does not define a nomination process for the president of the Council and initially several official and unofficial candidates were proposed. At the final European Council meeting on the treaty in Lisbon, on 19 November 2007, French president Nicolas Sarkozy set off public speculation on candidates by naming Tony Blair, Felipe González and Jean-Claude Juncker, and praising the three as worthy candidates with Blair in particular being a long time front runner for the post. However, he faced large scale opposition for being from a large state outside the eurozone and the Schengen Area, as well as being a leader who entered the Iraq War, which had split Europe. Minor opposition to other leaders such as Juncker also led to their rejection.

=== Full-time president ===
On 19 November 2009, Herman Van Rompuy, at that time Prime Minister of Belgium, was appointed the first full-time president of the European Council. The formal decision on the appointment was made after the Treaty of Lisbon came into force on 1 December 2009. The British prime minister, Gordon Brown, said that he had unanimous backing from the 27 EU leaders at the summit in Brussels on the evening of 19 November 2009. Brown praised Van Rompuy as "a consensus builder" who had "brought a period of political stability to his country after months of uncertainty". At a press conference after his appointment, Van Rompuy commented: "Every country should emerge victorious from negotiations. A negotiation that ends with a defeated party is never a good negotiation. I will consider everyone's interests and sensitivities. Even if our unity remains our strength, our diversity remains our wealth", he said, stressing the individuality of EU member states.

Van Rompuy's first council meeting was an informal gathering in the Solvay Library in Leopold Park, rather than the more usual formal gathering in the Justus Lipsius building nearby. The meeting was called to reflect on long term structural economic problems facing Europe, but was overtaken by the Euro area crisis.

== Duties and powers ==
=== Pre-2009 ===
The role of President-in-Office of the assembled European Council was performed by the head of state or government of the member state currently holding the presidency of the Council of the European Union. This presidency rotated every six months, meaning there was a new president of the European Council twice a year.

The role as President-in-Office was merely a primus inter pares role among other European heads of state or government. However, the president-in-office represented the European Council externally and reported to the European Parliament after its meetings as well as at the beginning and at the end of the presidency.

=== Post-2009 ===
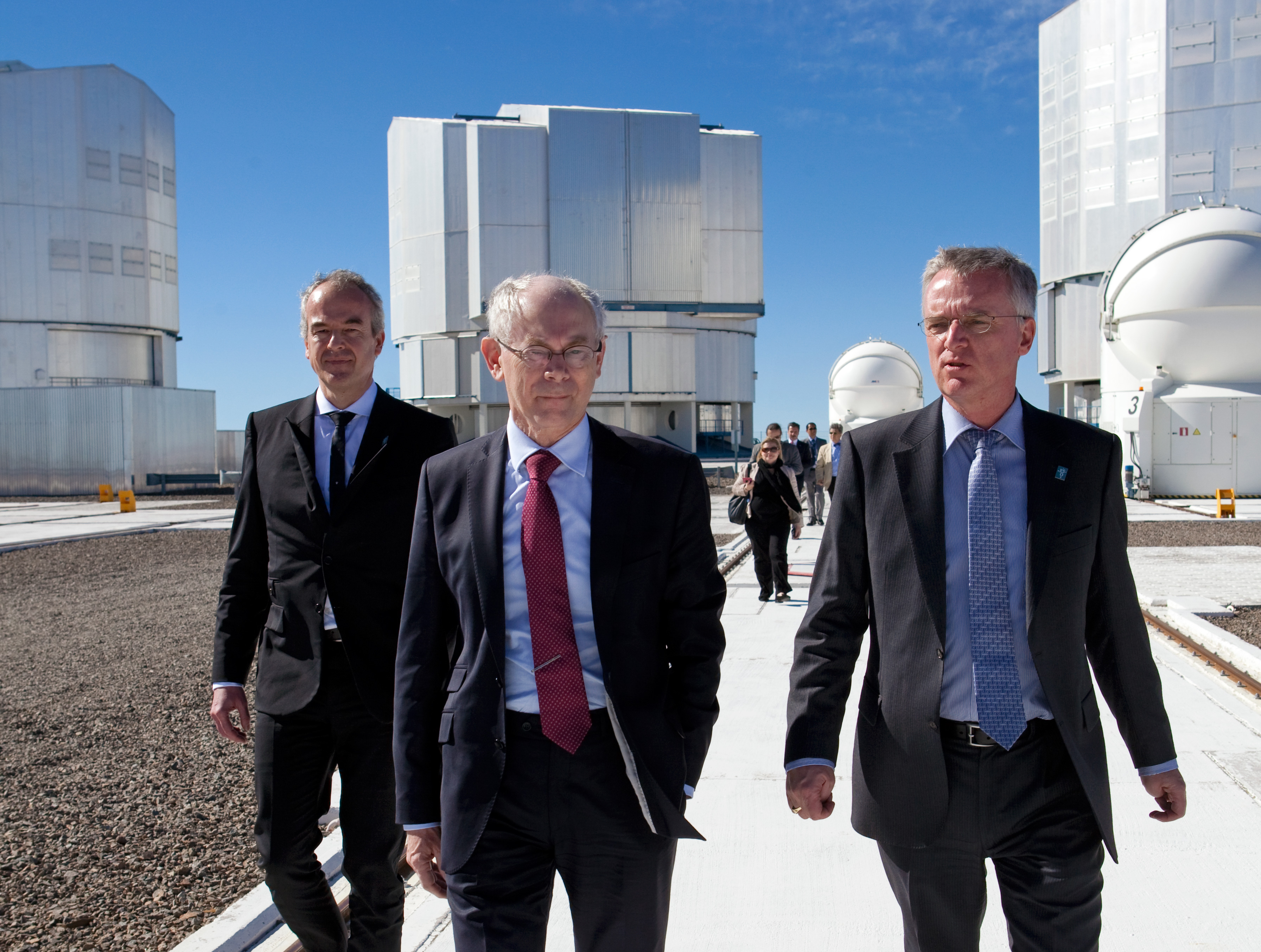
President of the European Council Herman Van Rompuy during a visit to the Paranal Observatory.

The president's role is largely political, preparing the work of the European Council, organising and chairing its meetings, seeking to find consensus among its members and reporting to the European Parliament after each meeting; the president will also "at his level and in that capacity, ensure the external representation of the Union on issues concerning its common foreign and security policy, without prejudice to the powers of the High Representative of the Union for Foreign Affairs and Security". Some overlap between the roles of the president of the European Council, the President of the Commission, and the High Representative—notably in foreign policy—leaves uncertainty about how much influence the President of the European Council will acquire. There is further concern over whether the president will have sufficient personnel and resources to fulfil the duties of the post effectively and that, in lacking a ministry, the president might become a "play ball" between EU leaders.

With the reorganisation of leading EU posts under the Lisbon Treaty, there was some criticism of each post's vague responsibilities. Ukrainian ambassador to the EU Andriy Veselovsky praised the framework and clarified it in his own terms: The president of the European Commission speaks as the EU's "government" while the new president of the European Council is a "strategist". The High Representative specialises in "bilateral relations" while the European commissioner for enlargement and European neighbourhood policy deals in technical matters such as the free trade agreement with Ukraine. The president of the European Parliament meanwhile articulates the EU's values.

The European Council president also extended his influence into financial policy, the most important area left to the rotating Council presidency, with the rotating presidency seeing a greater decrease in power than previously planned. Many of the changes introduced with the Lisbon Treaty need concretion through practical implementation by the current actors. The Spanish presidency unsuccessfully tried to challenge the European Council president's prominent post during the first rotating presidency of 2010, while the second half of the year saw a Belgian rotating presidency marked by a weakened caretaker government which did not challenge Herman van Rompuy, himself a Belgian politician. The Belgian rotating presidency announced it was taking a "backrow seat" with regards to both the European Council president and the high representative, thus fuelling hopes as well as concerns for a more communitarian character in both the council and foreign policy.

== Privileges of office ==
Formal negotiations on the salary and privileges of the permanent presidency began in April 2008 as part of the draft of the 2009 EU budget. The outcome was that the president should enjoy the same conditions as the president of the Commission, with a basic salary of 138% of the highest civil service grade (not including family and other allowances). This means a monthly salary of €31,200.

The president receives a chauffeured car and around 20 dedicated staff members. He also has a housing allowance, rather than an official residence which was considered "too symbolic". Likewise, the idea of a private jet was also rejected for being symbolic and, as one diplomat pointed out, a discrepancy in privileges between the European Council and Commission presidents may only fuel rivalry between the two.

The possibility of there being greater perks for the European Council president than Commission president prompted Parliament to threaten a rejection of the 2009 budget. It saw a large salary and extras as a symbolic signal that the post is intended to become more powerful, increasing intergovernmentalism at the Parliament's expense. With some in the Council suggesting a staff of up to 60, one MEP has argued in 2008 that the Committee on Constitutional Affairs ought to drop the gentlemen's agreement that Parliament and Council will not interfere in each other's budget.

== President's office ==
Although the European Council is, under the terms of the Lisbon treaty, a separate institution of the EU, it does not have its own administration. The administrative support for both the European Council and its President is provided by the General Secretariat of the Council of the European Union. The president does have, however, his own private office (cabinet) of close advisers. Van Rompuy chose as his first chief of staff (chef de cabinet) Baron Frans van Daele, formerly Belgian ambassador to, variously, the US, the UN, the EU and NATO and chief of staff of several Belgian foreign ministers. Upon his retirement in the autumn of 2012, Didier Seeuws, former Deputy Perm Rep of Belgium to the EU and former spokesman for Belgian PM Verhofstadt, replaced him. Also in his team were the former UK Labour MEP Richard Corbett and Van Rompuy's long standing press officer Dirk De Backer.

== Democratic mandate ==
=== Election ===
The president of the European Council is elected by its members through a reinforced qualified majority vote for a once-renewable term of two and a half years. Article 15 of the Treaty on European Union (TEU) identifies his duties. It is the Heads of State or Government who vote for this office.

The lack of accountability to MEPs or national parliamentarians has also cast doubt as to whether national leaders will in practice stand behind the president on major issues. Under the rotational system, the presidents simply had the mandate of their member states, while the new permanent president is chosen by the members of the European Council.

There have been calls by some, such as former German interior minister and former head of the Bundestag Wolfgang Schäuble, for direct elections to take place to give the President a mandate, this would strengthen the post within the European Council allowing for stronger leadership in addition to addressing the question of democratic legitimacy in the EU. However, this might cause conflict with Parliament's democratic mandate or a potential mandate for the Commission (see section below). To give a mandate to the European Council's president would signify a development of the Union's governance towards a presidential system, rather than a parliamentary system.

=== Relationship with Commission ===
There had been disagreement and concern over competition between the former president of the European Council Van Rompuy and the former Commission president Barroso, due to the vague language of the treaty. Some clarifications saw Van Rompuy as the "strategist" and Barroso as a head of government. In terms of economic policy, Van Rompuy saw the European Council as dealing with overall strategy and the Commission as dealing with the implementation. Despite weekly breakfasts together, there was a certain extent of rivalry between the two yet-defined posts.

Although the president of the European Council may not hold a national office, such as a prime minister of a member state, there is no such restraint on European offices. For example, the president may be an MEP.

Since the creation of the European Council presidency, former president Van Rompuy and former Commission President Barroso had begun to compete with each other as Van Rompuy had benefited from the general shift in power from the Commission to the European Council yet with Barroso still holding the real powers. At international summits they continued previous practice of both going at the same time. The complicated situation had renewed some calls to merge the posts, possibly at the end of Barroso's term in 2014. However some member states had expected to oppose the creation of such a high-profile post.

If the posts are not to be combined, some believe that the dual-presidential system could lead to "cohabitation" and infighting between the two offices. While it is comparable to the French model, where there is a president (the European Council president) and prime minister (the Commission president), the Council president does not hold formal powers such as the ability to directly appoint and sack the Commission president, or the ability to dissolve Parliament. The European Council president has prestige, but lacks power. The Commission president has power, but lacks the prestige of the European Council president. Some believe this problem would be increased further if the Council president were to be strengthened by a democratic mandate, as mentioned above.

== List of presidents of the European Council ==
=== Rotating presidency ===
| Year | Period | President-in-Office | European party | Presidency |
|---|---|---|---|---|
| 1975 | Jan–Jun | Liam Cosgrave | European People's Party | Ireland |
| 1975 | Jul–Dec | Aldo Moro | European People's Party | Italy |
| 1976 | Jan–Jun | Gaston Thorn | Liberal and Democratic Group | Luxembourg |
| 1976 | Jul–Dec | Joop den Uyl | Party of European Socialists | Netherlands |
| 1977 | Jan–Jun | James Callaghan | Party of European Socialists | United Kingdom |
| 1977 | Jul–Dec | Leo Tindemans | European People's Party | Belgium |
| 1978 | Jan–Jun | Anker Jørgensen | Party of European Socialists | Denmark |
| 1978 | Jul–Dec | Helmut Schmidt | Party of European Socialists | West Germany |
| 1979 | Jan–Jun | Valéry Giscard d'Estaing | European Liberal Democrat and Reform Party | France |
| 1979 | Jul–Dec | Jack Lynch | European Progressive Democrats | Ireland |
| 1979 | Dec | Charles Haughey | European Progressive Democrats | Ireland |
| 1980 | Jan–Jun | Francesco Cossiga | European People's Party | Italy |
| 1980 | Jul–Dec | Pierre Werner | European People's Party | Luxembourg |
| 1981 | Jan–Jun | Dries van Agt | European People's Party | Netherlands |
| 1981 | Jul–Dec | Margaret Thatcher | Independent | United Kingdom |
| 1982 | Jan–Jun | Wilfried Martens | European People's Party | Belgium |
| 1982 | Jul–Sep | Anker Jørgensen | Party of European Socialists | Denmark |
| 1982 | Sep–Dec | Poul Schlüter | European People's Party | Denmark |
| 1983 | Jan–Jun | Helmut Kohl | European People's Party | West Germany |
| 1983 | Jul–Dec | Andreas Papandreou | Party of European Socialists | Greece |
| 1984 | Jan–Jun | François Mitterrand | Party of European Socialists | France |
| 1984 | Jul–Dec | Garret FitzGerald | European People's Party | Ireland |
| 1985 | Jan–Jun | Bettino Craxi | Party of European Socialists | Italy |
| 1985 | Jul–Dec | Jacques Santer | European People's Party | Luxembourg |
| 1986 | Jan–Jun | Ruud Lubbers | European People's Party | Netherlands |
| 1986 | Jul–Dec | Margaret Thatcher | Independent | United Kingdom |
| 1987 | Jan–Jun | Wilfried Martens | European People's Party | Belgium |
| 1987 | Jul–Dec | Poul Schlüter | European People's Party | Denmark |
| 1988 | Jan–Jun | Helmut Kohl | European People's Party | West Germany |
| 1988 | Jul–Dec | Andreas Papandreou | Party of European Socialists | Greece |
| 1989 | Jan–Jun | Felipe González | Party of European Socialists | Spain |
| 1989 | Jul–Dec | François Mitterrand | Party of European Socialists | France |
| 1990 | Jan–Jun | Charles Haughey | European Democratic Alliance | Ireland |
| 1990 | Jul–Dec | Giulio Andreotti | European People's Party | Italy |
| 1991 | Jan–Jun | Jacques Santer | European People's Party | Luxembourg |
| 1991 | Jul–Dec | Ruud Lubbers | European People's Party | Netherlands |
| 1992 | Jan–Jun | Aníbal Cavaco Silva | European Liberal Democrat and Reform Party | Portugal |
| 1992 | Jul–Dec | John Major | Independent | United Kingdom |
| 1993 | Jan | Poul Schlüter | European People's Party | Denmark |
| 1993 | Jan–Jun | Poul Nyrup Rasmussen | Party of European Socialists | Denmark |
| 1993 | Jul–Dec | Jean-Luc Dehaene | European People's Party | Belgium |
| 1994 | Jan–Jun | Andreas Papandreou | Party of European Socialists | Greece |
| 1994 | Jul–Dec | Helmut Kohl | European People's Party | Germany |
| 1995 | Jan–May | François Mitterrand | Party of European Socialists | France |
| 1995 | May–Jun | Jacques Chirac | Independent | France |
| 1995 | Jul–Dec | Felipe González | Party of European Socialists | Spain |
| 1996 | Jan–May | Lamberto Dini | European Liberal Democrat and Reform Party | Italy |
| 1996 | May–Jun | Romano Prodi | European Liberal Democrat and Reform Party | Italy |
| 1996 | Jul–Dec | John Bruton | European People's Party | Ireland |
| 1997 | Jan–Jun | Wim Kok | Party of European Socialists | Netherlands |
| 1997 | Jul–Dec | Jean-Claude Juncker | European People's Party | Luxembourg |
| 1998 | Jan–Jun | Tony Blair | Party of European Socialists | United Kingdom |
| 1998 | Jul–Dec | Viktor Klima | Party of European Socialists | Austria |
| 1999 | Jan–Jun | Gerhard Schröder | Party of European Socialists | Germany |
| 1999 | Jul–Dec | Paavo Lipponen | Party of European Socialists | Finland |
| 2000 | Jan–Jun | António Guterres | Party of European Socialists | Portugal |
| 2000 | Jul–Dec | Jacques Chirac | European People's Party | France |
| 2001 | Jan–Jun | Göran Persson | Party of European Socialists | Sweden |
| 2001 | Jul–Dec | Guy Verhofstadt | European Liberal Democrat and Reform Party | Belgium |
| 2002 | Jan–Jun | José María Aznar | European People's Party | Spain |
| 2002 | Jul–Dec | Anders Fogh Rasmussen | European Liberal Democrat and Reform Party | Denmark |
| 2003 | Jan–Jun | Costas Simitis | Party of European Socialists | Greece |
| 2003 | Jul–Dec | Silvio Berlusconi | European People's Party | Italy |
| 2004 | Jan–Jun | Bertie Ahern | Union for Europe of the Nations | Ireland |
| 2004 | Jul–Dec | Jan Peter Balkenende | European People's Party | Netherlands |
| 2005 | Jan–Jun | Jean-Claude Juncker | European People's Party | Luxembourg |
| 2005 | Jul–Dec | Tony Blair | Party of European Socialists | United Kingdom |
| 2006 | Jan–Jun | Wolfgang Schüssel | European People's Party | Austria |
| 2006 | Jul–Dec | Matti Vanhanen | European Liberal Democrat and Reform Party | Finland |
| 2007 | Jan–Jun | Angela Merkel | European People's Party | Germany |
| 2007 | Jul–Dec | José Sócrates | Party of European Socialists | Portugal |
| 2008 | Jan–Jun | Janez Janša | European People's Party | Slovenia |
| 2008 | Jul–Dec | Nicolas Sarkozy | European People's Party | France |
| 2009 | Jan–May | Mirek Topolánek | Alliance of European Conservatives and Reformists | Czech Republic |
| 2009 | May–Jun | Jan Fischer | Independent | Czech Republic |
| 2009 | Jul–Nov | Fredrik Reinfeldt | European People's Party | Sweden |

=== Permanent presidents ===
| No. | Portrait | Name (born–died) | State | Term of office | | | European party | National party | Ref. |
| No. | Portrait | Name (born–died) | State | Took office | Left office | Time in office | European party | National party | Ref. |
|---|---|---|---|---|---|---|---|---|---|
| 1 | | Herman Van Rompuy (born 1947) | Belgium | 1 December 2009 | 30 November 2014 | 5 years | European People's Party | CD&V | |
| 2 | | Donald Tusk (born 1957) | Poland | 1 December 2014 | 30 November 2019 | 5 years | European People's Party | PO | |
| 3 | | Charles Michel (born 1975) | Belgium | 1 December 2019 | 30 November 2024 | 5 years | Renew Europe | MR | |
| 4 | | António Costa (born 1961) | Portugal | 1 December 2024 | Incumbent | 1 year, 345 days | Party of European Socialists | PS | |

== See also ==
- List of presidents of EU institutions
  - President of the European Parliament
  - President of the European Commission
  - Presidency of the Council of the European Union
- President of the European Union
