= Jeppe Tranholm-Mikkelsen =

Danish diplomat (born 1962)

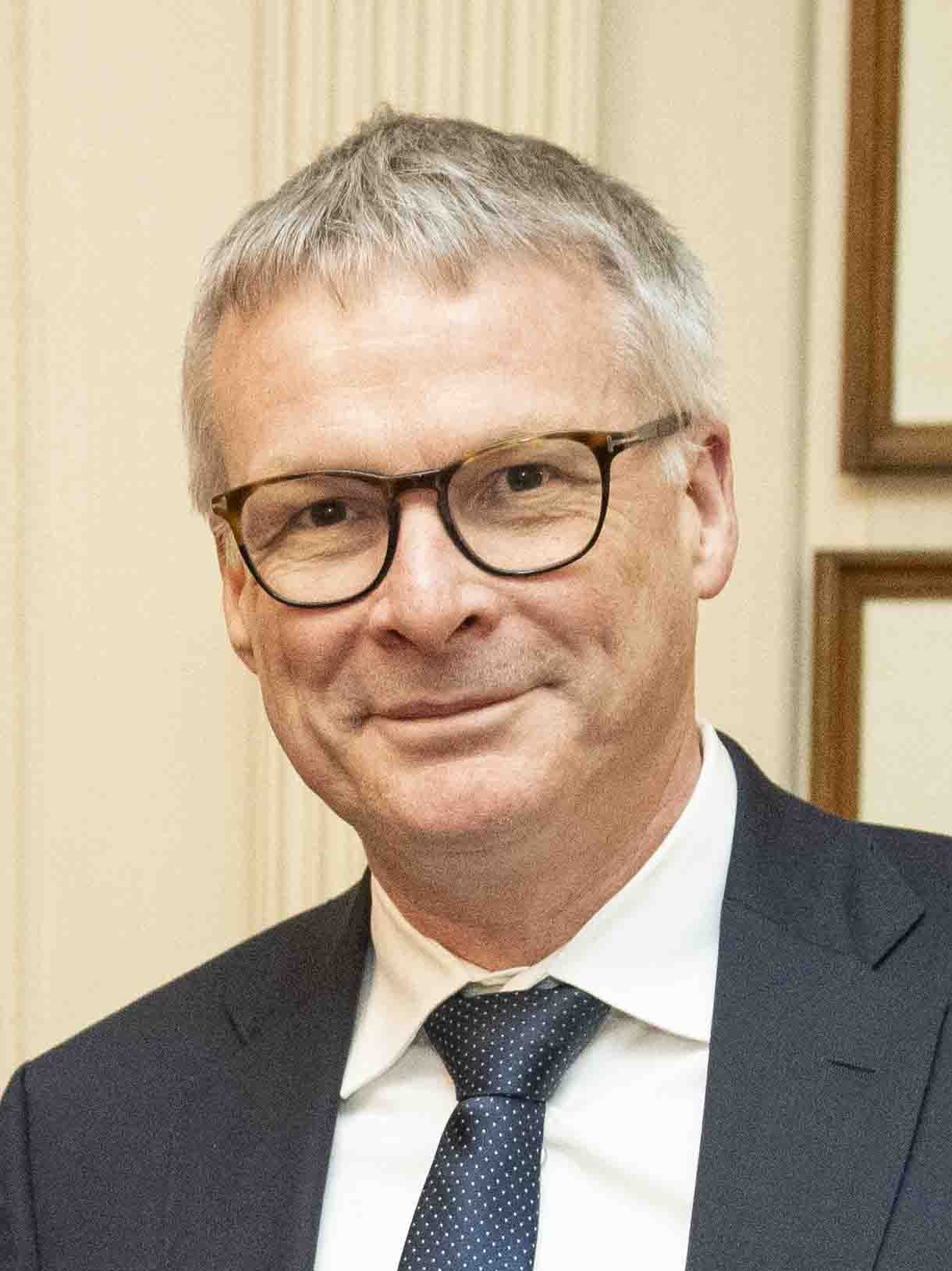
- Jeppe Tranholm-Mikkelsen in 2024

Secretary-General of the Council of the European Union
- In office 1 July 2015 – 1 May 2022
- Preceded by: Uwe Corsepius
- Succeeded by: Didier Seeuws (Acting); William Shapcott (Acting); Thérèse Blanchet

Personal details
- Born: Jeppe Tranholm-Mikkelsen; 30 October 1962 (age 63) Aden, Aden (now Yemen)
- Spouse: Birgitte Karnøe Frederiksen (m. 1997)
- Children: 3
- Education: London School of Economics; Aarhus University

Jeppe Tranholm-Mikkelsen (born 30 October 1962) is a Danish diplomat who has served as Secretary-General of the Council of the European Union from 2015 to 2022.

== Early life and education ==
Jeppe Tranholm-Mikkelsen was born on 30 October 1962 in Aden, Colony of Aden (now Yemen). His father was a Lutheran missionary and his mother was a teacher. After the outbreak of the North Yemen Civil War, the family returned to Denmark. They settled in North Jutland, where Tranholm-Mikkelsen grew up in Denmark in a progressive, liberal family.

Tranholm-Mikkelsen started his education in a Protestant school, then earned a Master of Science in 1990 in international relations from the London School of Economics. Two years later, he obtained a Masters of Science in Political Science from Aarhus University in Denmark. Besides Danish, he speaks English, German, French, some Spanish, Dutch and Chinese.

== Career ==
Tranholm-Mikkelsen began his professional career in 1992 with the Danish civil service, working in the Ministry of Foreign Affairs and in the Office of the Prime Minister. Later on, he joined the Danish representation to the European Union and in 2003 became the Deputy Permanent Representative to the EU, with a title of ambassador. In 2007, he became ambassador to China and in 2010, he was named Permanent Representative to the EU, a position he held until becoming the Secretary-General of the Council of the European Union. On 21 April 2015, the Council of the European Union appointed him to a term of five years running from 1 July 2015 to 30 June 2020. This followed an agreement that was reached at a meeting of the European Council on 19 March 2015. On 29 April 2020 he was appointed to a second term. The second, five-year term will run from 1 July 2020 to 30 June 2025.

Tranholm-Mikkelsen chose the post of secretary general of the Council rather than the Danish ambassador to the United States.
