= Pierre de Boissieu =

French diplomat

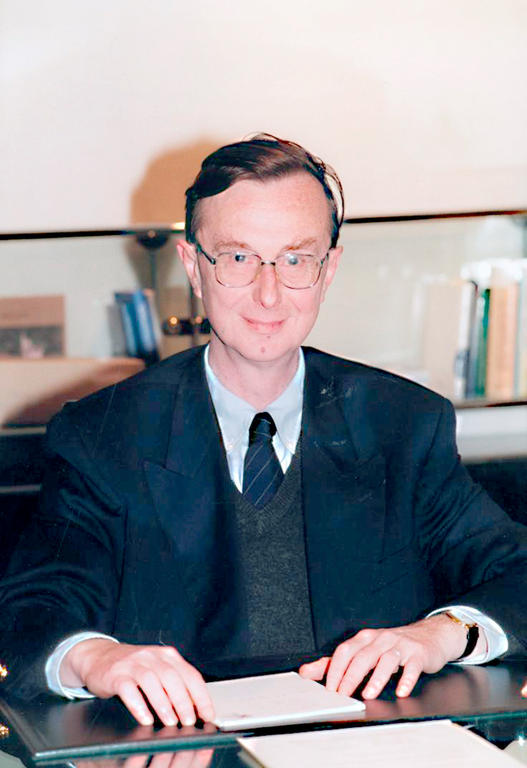

Secretary-General of the Council of the European Union
- In office 1 December 2009 – 26 June 2011
- Preceded by: Javier Solana
- Succeeded by: Uwe Corsepius

Personal details
- Born: 14 June 1945 (age 81) Paris, France
- Relatives: Christian de Boissieu (brother)
- Education: National School of Administration
- Profession: Economist

Pierre de Boissieu (French pronunciation: [pjɛʁ də bwasjø]; born 1945) is a French diplomat and former French ambassador to the European Union (EU). He was the Secretary-General of the Council of the European Union from 1 December 2009 until 26 June 2011. In this post he was preceded by Javier Solana and was succeeded by Uwe Corsepius. Prior to being Secretary General he was Deputy Secretary-General from October 1999 to 30 November 2009.

Political offices
Preceded by Javier Solana	Secretary-General of the Council of the European Union; 2009–2011	Succeeded by Uwe Corsepius
