= Thérèse Blanchet =

French-Swiss lawyer and diplomat (born 1962)

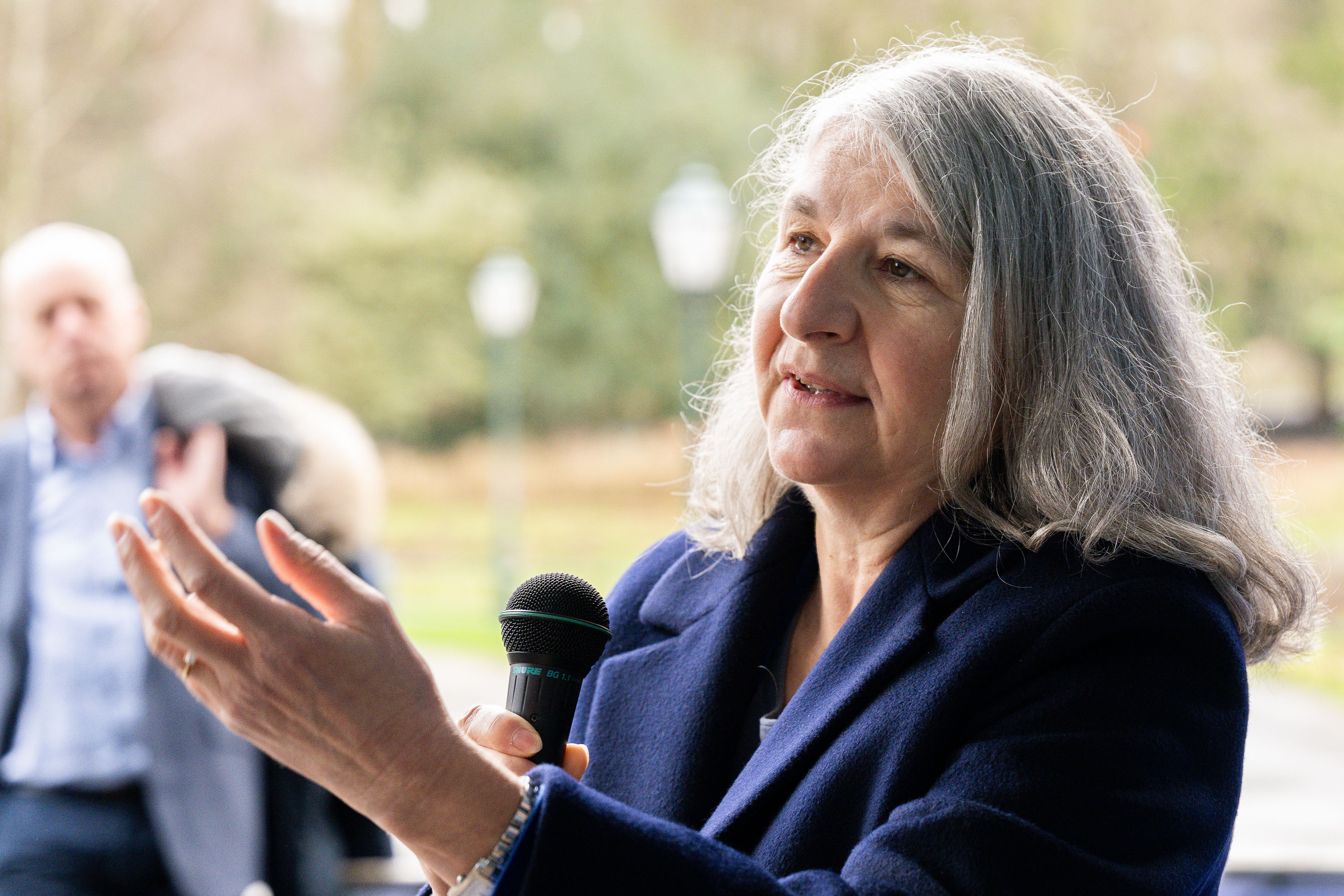
- Blanchet in 2024

Secretary-General of the Council of the European Union
- Incumbent
- Assumed office 1 November 2022
- Preceded by: Jeppe Tranholm-Mikkelsen

Personal details
- Born: Thérèse Émilie Marie Blanchet; 22 May 1962 (age 64) Geneva, Switzerland
- Party: Independent
- Spouse: Jouko Lempiäinen
- Children: 1
- Education: University of Geneva (Law degree); College of Europe (Master of European Law)

Thérèse Émilie Marie Blanchet (French pronunciation: [teʁɛz blɑ̃ʃɛ]; born 22 May 1962) is a French-Swiss attorney serving as secretary-general of the Council of the European Union since 1 November 2022. She is the first woman to hold the post.

Born in Geneva, she grew up in neighbouring Confignon. She attended the University of Geneva and College of Europe and became an attorney at law in 1987. From 2019 to 2022, she was Legal Counsel of the Council and European Council and Director-General of the Council Legal Service.

== Personal life ==
Blanchet is married to Jouko Lempiäinen, a Finnish national, and has one child.

== Honours ==
- Knight of the Legion of Honour (2019)
