= Secretary General of the Union of South American Nations =

- Incumbent; Vacant since January 2017
- Term length: 2 years
- Inaugural holder: Néstor Kirchner
- Formation: 2010
- Website: www.unasursg.org (in Spanish)

The Secretary General of the Union of South American Nations is the legal representative of the Secretariat of the Union of South American Nations (UNASUR).

== History ==
The position was established by the UNASUR Constitutive Treaty and the first Secretary General was designated on 4 May 2010.

== Function ==
The Secretary General of UNASUR is proposed by the Foreign Ministers council, and designated by the Heads of State and Government council for a two-year term, renewable once. A Secretary General cannot be of the same nationality in succession.

The Secretary General exercises the legal representation of the UNASUR Secretariat. The officials selection for the latter requires an equitative representation between UNASUR Member States. It also requires an equitative representation, as much as possible, along gender, language and ethnic criteria. The tasks of the Secretary General are:

- Helping the Heads of State council, the Foreign Ministers council, the Delegates council, and the Pro Tempore President, in the accomplishment of their tasks.
- Proposing initiatives and monitoring the adequate functioning of the UNASUR organizations.
- Preparing and presenting the Annual Report, and respective reports, to UNASUR organizations meetings.
- Serving as the legal depositary of UNASUR Agreements, and allowing its publication.
- Preparing the annual budget for the Delegates Council consideration, and adopting measures for good management and administration, as needed.
- Projecting reglamentations for the Secretariat, and submitting them to the pertaining bodies for consideration and approval.
- Coordinating the labor bestowed on it by UNASUR organizations along with other Latin American and the Caribbean integration and cooperation entities.
- Executing, according to reglamentations, every necessary legal action for the good management and administration of the Secretariat.

== List of Secretaries-General ==
| Secretary-General | | Portrait | State | National party | Took office | Left office |
|---|---|---|---|---|---|---|
| 1 | Néstor Carlos Kirchner | | Argentina | Front for Victory—Justicialist Party | 4 May 2010 | 27 October 2010 |
| — | Post vacant by death | | | | | |
| 2 | María Emma Mejia Velez | | Colombia | Colombian Liberal Party | 9 May 2011 | 11 June 2012 |
| 3 | Alí Rodríguez Araque | | Venezuela | Great Patriotic Pole—United Socialist Party of Venezuela | 11 June 2012 | 31 July 2014 |
| 4 | Ernesto Samper | | Colombia | Colombian Liberal Party | 1 August 2014 | 31 January 2017 |
| — | Post vacant; No successor approved | | | | | |
