= American Parliament =

American Parliament may refer to:

- A misnomer for the United States Congress
- Central American Parliament, a political institution of the Central American Integration System
- South American Parliament, a proposed body of the Union of South American Nations
- Latin American Parliament, a regional, permanent organization composed by the countries of Latin America and the Caribbean
