= SADC =

SADC may refer to:

- Southern African Development Community, successor to the Southern African Development Coordination Conference (SADCC)
- South American Defense Council
- Singapore Air Defence Command, now the Republic of Singapore Air Force

.
