= 2010 South American Summit =

International meeting in Georgetown, Guyana

- Host country: Guyana
- Date: November 26, 2010

The 2010 South American summit (officially the 4th Ordinary Meeting of the Council of Heads of State and Government of the Union of South American Nations), took place in Georgetown, Guyana on November 26, 2010. Eight heads of state and four foreign ministers of the Union of South American Nations attended the summit. During the summit, the leaders signed an additional protocol to the Constitutive Treaty, adding a democratic clause to the charter of the organization. The Georgetown summit ended with the Ecuadorian president handing the UNASUR pro-tempore presidency for the next twelve months to his Guyanese counterpart, Bharrat Jagdeo.

== Leaders at the summit ==
=== Heads of State and Government ===
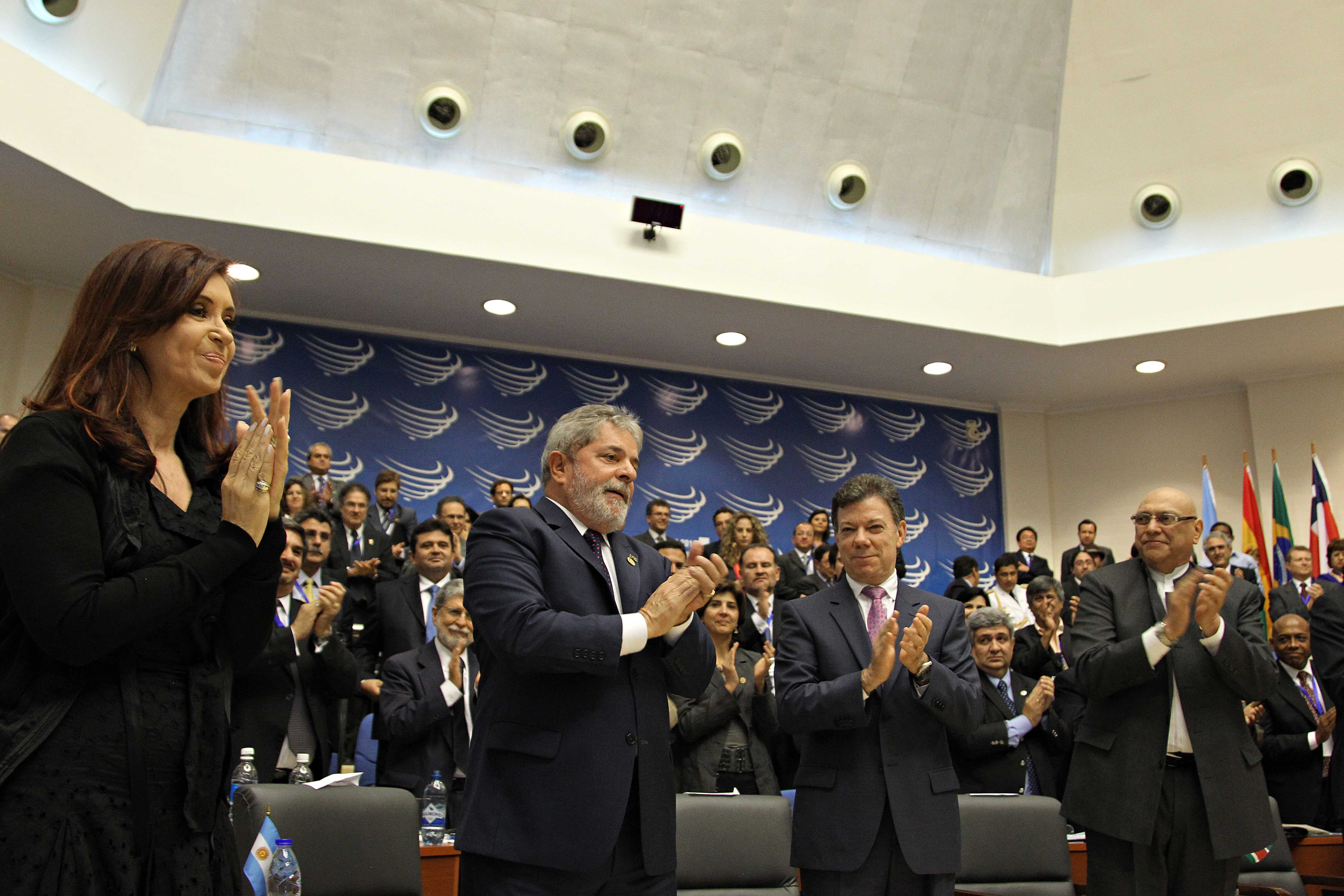
Leaders at the 2010 Unasur summit. From left are: President Cristina Fernández of Argentina; President Dilma Rousseff of Brazil; President Juan Manuel Santos of Colombia, and President Fernando Lugo of Paraguay.

The heads of state and heads of government of eight countries participated. The heads of state from Chile, Peru, Uruguay and Bolivia could not attend.

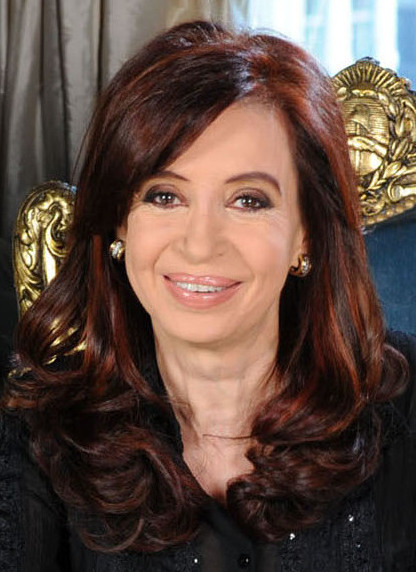
(Argentina) Argentina
Cristina Fernández de Kirchner, President

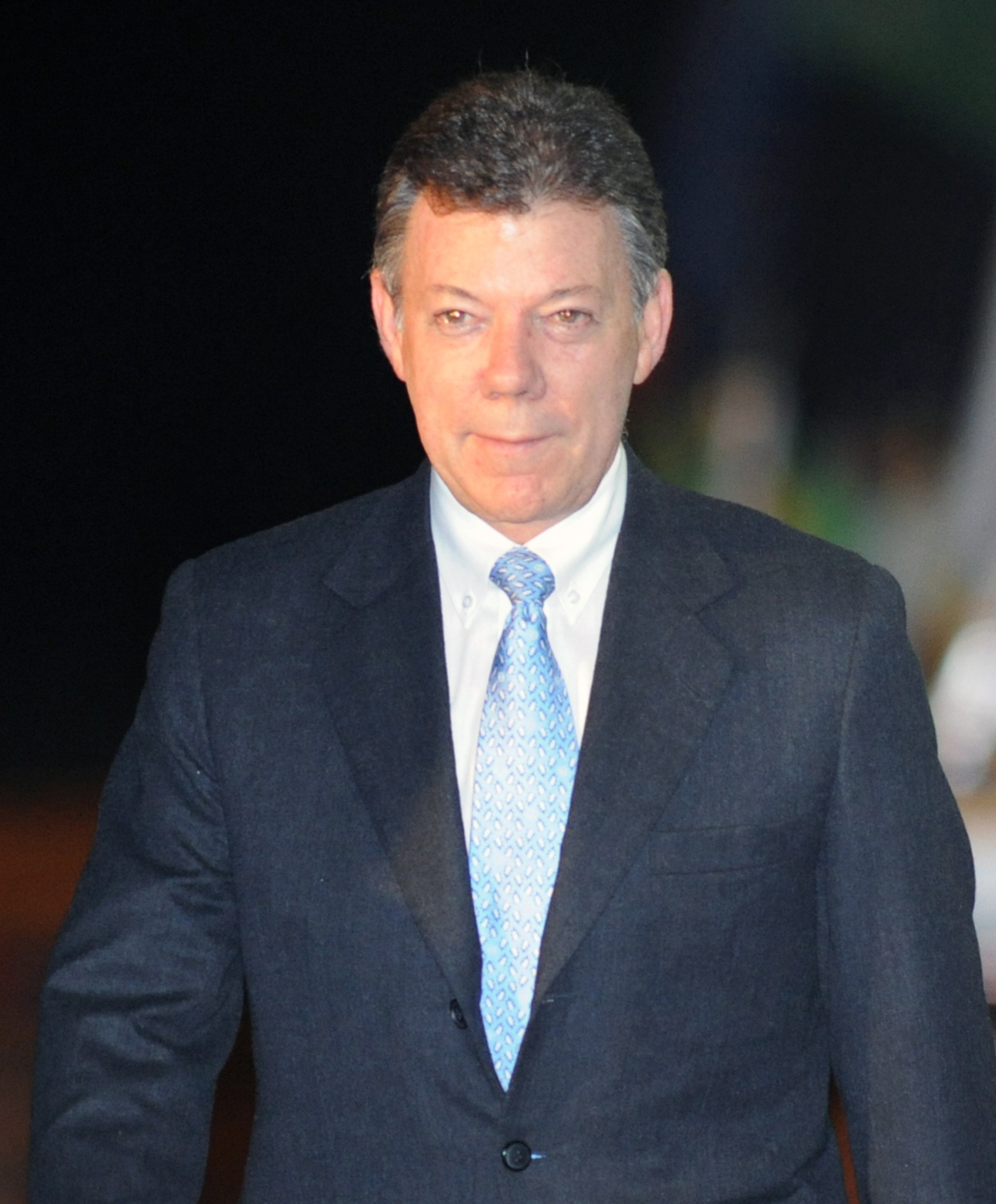
(Colombia) Colombia
Juan Manuel Santos, President

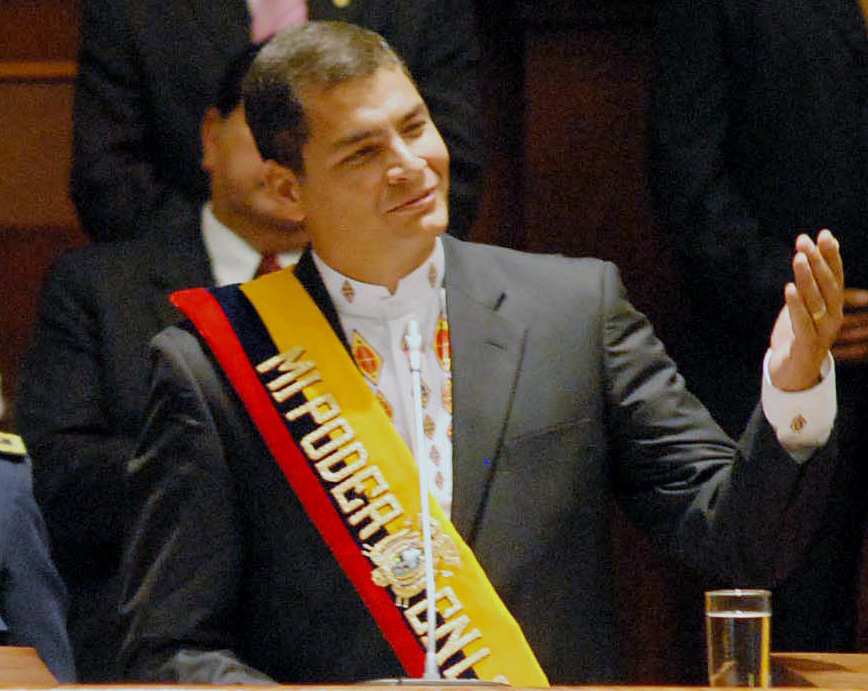
(Ecuador) Ecuador
Rafael Correa, President

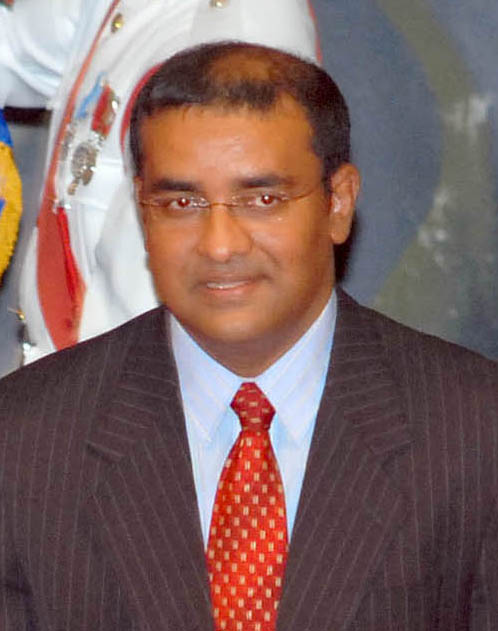
(Guyana) Guyana
Bharrat Jagdeo, President

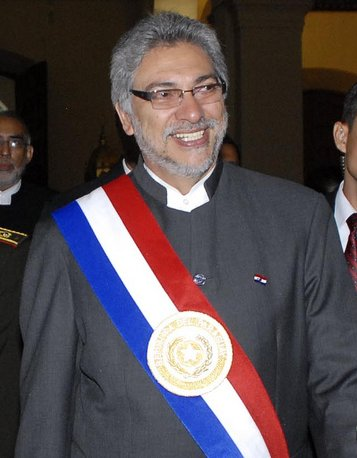
(Paraguay) Paraguay
Fernando Lugo, President

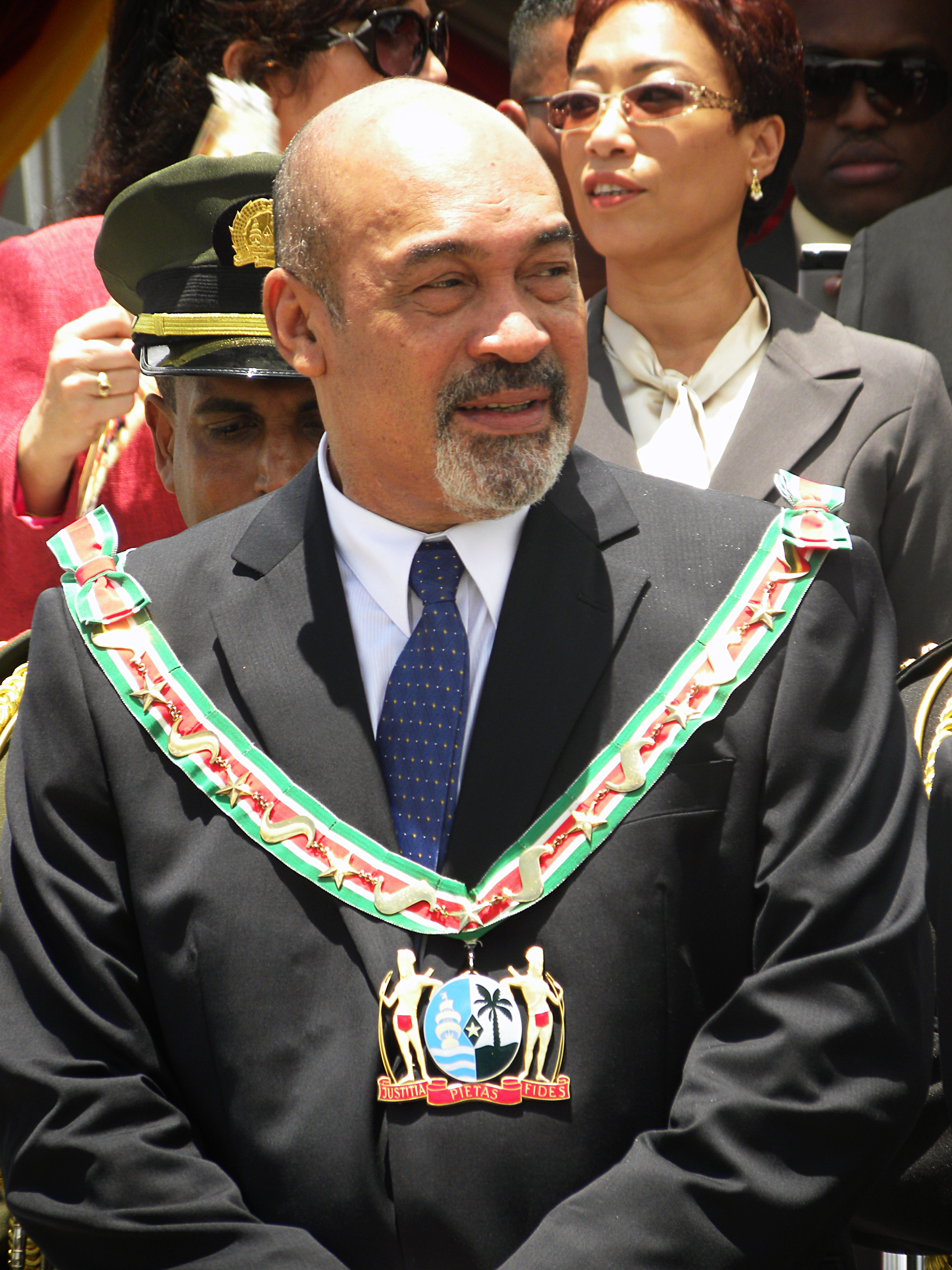
(Suriname) Suriname
Dési Bouterse, President

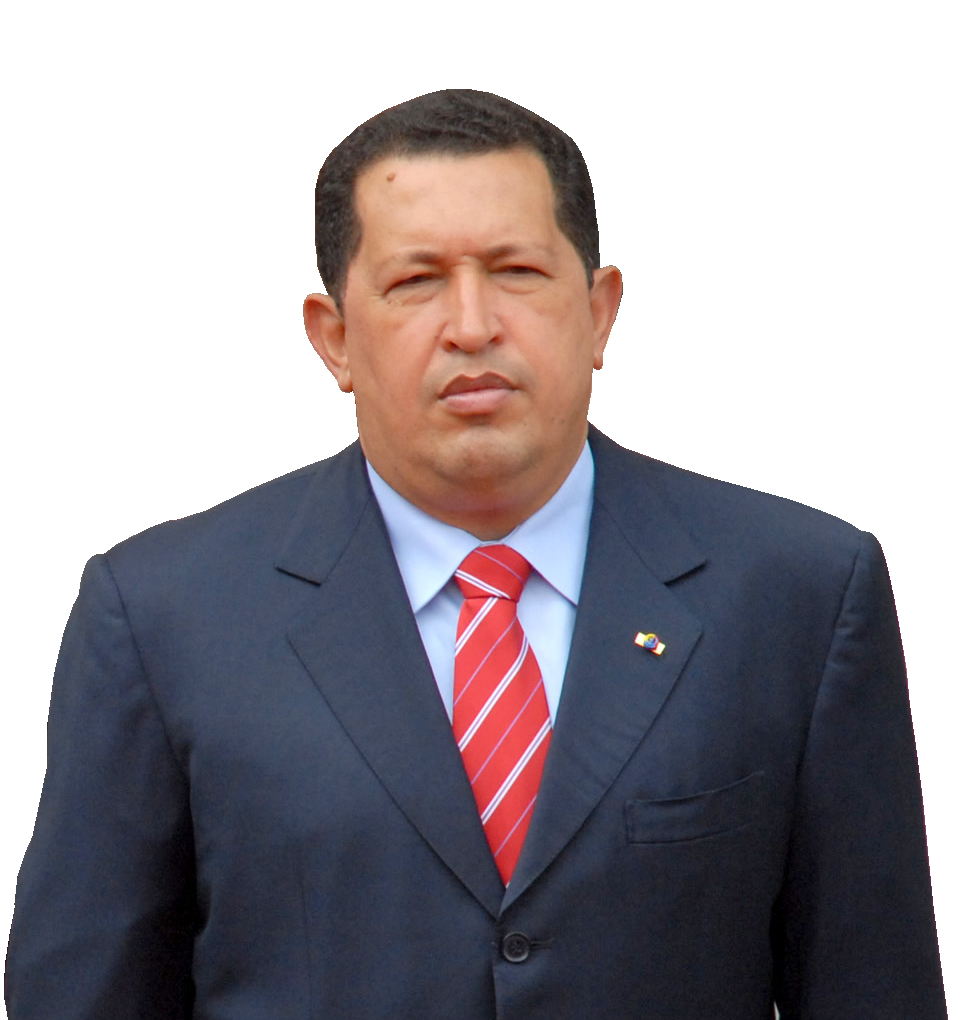
(Venezuela) Venezuela
Hugo Chávez, President

=== Foreign ministers ===
The foreign ministers of Bolivia (David Choquehuanca), Chile (Alfredo Moreno), Peru (José Antonio García Belaúnde) and Uruguay (Luis Almagro) represented their respective governments.

== Issues ==
=== Regional integration ===
Brazilian President Luiz Inácio Lula da Silva advocated for the elimination of the asymmetries stopping the integration of South America, in his speech during the summit. "None of our countries will really be prosperous, without all of us being also prosperous," said the Brazilian president.

=== Secretary-General ===
The name of the new secretary-general of the organization will remain unknown until the next presidential meeting in Mar del Plata, Argentina.

=== Guyanese presidency ===
Guyana, which took over the Unasur rotating presidency from Ecuador, is one of South America's poorest countries and for this reason, President Lula has already announced that Brazil will provide assistance for Georgetown's efforts in presiding over the regional bloc.

=== Falklands/Malvinas ===
The summit addressed the Falkland Islands sovereignty dispute between Argentina and the United Kingdom. Several articles of the final declaration state that all Unasur ports will be closed to vessels operating under the "illegal flag of Malvinas (Falkland Islands)".

== Accomplishments ==
=== Democratic clause ===
The leaders adopted an additional protocol to the organization's Constitutive Treaty, which added a democratic clause to the charter. The democratic clause imposes sanctions on any member country of UNASUR that breaks or attempts to break constitutional rule or the democratic system. The clause establishes sanctions, such as shutting down borders and the suspension of trade, against the country that suffers an attempted coup. The decision to include a democratic clause was made after the recent upheaval in Ecuador that briefly threatened the administration of President, Rafael Correa.

=== Georgetown Declaration ===
At the end of the summit, the heads of state and foreign ministers issued the "Georgetown Declaration". In the declaration, the leaders reiterated their commitment expressed in the “Declaration of Bariloche” of August 28, 2009, to strengthen South America as a zone of peace, upholding the decision to refrain from resorting to the threat or use of force against the territorial integrity of another UNASUR State. The leaders expressed their willingness to continue working toward the consolidation of a common space for the political, economic, social, cultural, energy, environmental and infrastructure integration of the region, in order to achieve sustainable development.
