= President pro tempore of the Union of South American Nations =

Head position of the Union of South American Nations

President Pro Tempore of Union of South American Nations
- Incumbent; Vacant since 16 April 2019
- Term length: 1 year; states (alphabet) rotation
- Inaugural holder: Michelle Bachelet
- Formation: 2008
- Website: unasursg.org

The President Pro Tempore of the Union of South American Nations is the head position and representative of the Union of South American Nations (UNASUR). At international meetings, declarations and concerted opinions of the supranational organism are presented by the President Pro Tempore. The office is exercised for a one-year period on a pro tempore basis by one of the heads of state of each UNASUR Member State, the succession following alphabetical order. The most recent president was the President of Bolivia, Evo Morales, who served, as acknowledged by unasursg.org, between 17 April 2018 and 16 April 2019.

The attributions of the President Pro Tempore are:

To organize, invite members, and preside over UNASUR meetings, present to the Council of Ministers of Foreign Affairs the annual plan of activities of UNASUR and the meetings agenda, in coordination with the Secretary General, represent UNASUR in international meetings, with the approval of the Member States and sign declarations and agreements with third parties, after approval from the pertaining UNASUR institutions.

The presidency pro tempore directs the eight ministerial councils of UNASUR: South American Council of Health, South American Council of Social Development, South American Council of Infrastructure and Planning, South American Council of Education, Culture, Science, Technology and Innovation; South American Council of Fight against the South American Narcotráfico, Council of Defense South American, South American Council of Economy and Finances, and South American Council.

== List of presidents pro tempore ==
President pro tempore		Portrait	State	National party	Took office	Left office
1	Michelle Bachelet; Verónica Michelle Bachelet Jeria		Chile	Socialist Party of Chile	23 May 2008	10 August 2009
1	Michelle Bachelet; Verónica Michelle Bachelet Jeria		The first President of the Union of South American Nations and co-serving as the President of Chile.			
2	Rafael Correa; Rafael Vicente Correa Delgado		Ecuador	PAIS Alliance	10 August 2009	26 November 2010
2	Rafael Correa; Rafael Vicente Correa Delgado		The second President of the Union of South American Nations and co-serving as the President of Ecuador.			
3	Bharrat Jagdeo		Guyana	People's Progressive Party	26 November 2010	29 October 2011
3	Bharrat Jagdeo		The third President of the Union of South American Nations and co-serving as the President of Guyana.			
4	Fernando Lugo; Fernando Armindo Lugo Méndez		Paraguay	Guasú Front	29 October 2011	22 June 2012
4	Fernando Lugo; Fernando Armindo Lugo Méndez		The fourth President of the Union of South American Nations and co-serving as the President of Paraguay. Lugo resigned after being impeached as the President of Paraguay.			
5	Ollanta Humala; Ollanta Moisés Humala Tasso		Peru	Peruvian Nationalist Party	29 June 2012	30 August 2013
5	Ollanta Humala; Ollanta Moisés Humala Tasso		The fifth President of the Union of South American Nations and co-serving as the President of Peru.			
6	Dési Bouterse; Desiré Delano Bouterse		Suriname	National Democratic Party	30 August 2013	4 December 2014
6	Dési Bouterse; Desiré Delano Bouterse		The sixth President of the Union of South American Nations and co-serving as the President of Suriname.			
7	José Mujica; José Alberto "Pepe" Mujica Cordano		Uruguay	Movement of Popular Participation	4 December 2014	1 March 2015
7	José Mujica; José Alberto "Pepe" Mujica Cordano		The seventh President of the Union of South American Nations and co-serving as the President of Uruguay.			
8	Tabaré Vázquez; Tabaré Ramón Vázquez Rosas		Uruguay	Socialist Party of Uruguay	1 March 2015	17 April 2016
8	Tabaré Vázquez; Tabaré Ramón Vázquez Rosas		The eighth President of the Union of South American Nations and co-serving as the President of Uruguay.			
9	Nicolás Maduro; Nicolás Maduro Moros		Venezuela	United Socialist Party of Venezuela	17 April 2016	17 April 2017
9	Nicolás Maduro; Nicolás Maduro Moros		The ninth President of the Union of South American Nations and co-serving as the President of Venezuela.			
10	Mauricio Macri		Argentina	Republican Proposal	17 April 2017	17 April 2018
10	Mauricio Macri		The tenth President of the Union of South American Nations and co-serving as the President of Argentina.			
11	Evo Morales		Bolivia	Movement for Socialism	17 April 2018	16 April 2019
11	Evo Morales		The eleventh President of the Union of South American Nations and co-serving as the President of Bolivia.			
