= Forum for the Progress and Integration of South America =

Intergovernmental regional organization

(in other official languages)
Spanish	Foro para el Progreso e Integración de América del Sur
Dutch	Forum voor de Vooruitgang en Integratie van Zuid-Amerika
Portuguese	Fórum para o Progresso e Desenvolvimento da América do Sul
- Logo

- Member states Suspended member states
- Administrative center: Rotational: currently Asunción, Paraguay
- Official languages: Spanish; Portuguese; English; Dutch
- Demonym: South American
- Type: International organization
- Membership: 9 members: Argentina; Brazil; Chile (participation suspended); Colombia; Ecuador; Guyana; Paraguay; Peru; Suriname; Observers; Bolivia; Uruguay

Leaders
  - President pro tempore: Santiago Peña
- Establishment: Formation
  - Santiago Declaration: 22 March 2019
- Website foroprosur.org

A clickable Euler diagram showing the relationships between various multinational organizations in the Americas

The Forum for the Progress and Integration of South America (Spanish: Foro para el Progreso e Integración de América del Sur, PROSUR; Portuguese: Fórum para o Progresso e Desenvolvimento da América do Sul, PROSUL, Dutch: Forum voor de Vooruitgang en Integratie van Zuid-Amerika, FVIZA) is an initiative by Sebastián Piñera and Iván Duque, for the creation of an integration body to replace the Union of South American Nations.

In the words of the Colombian president, who made the announcement on 14 January 2019, PROSUR would be "a South American coordination mechanism for public policies, in defense of democracy, the independence of powers, the market economy, the social agenda, with sustainability and with due application". On 18 February 2019, the President of Chile, Sebastián Piñera, said "this new forum will be open to all South American countries that meet two requirements: full validity of the rule of law and full respect for freedoms and human rights".

It has been characterised as a right-wing response to the left-wing UNASUR.

On April 3, 2022, the new president of Chile, Gabriel Boric, announced that the country was suspending its participation in the alliance. Suriname joined the alliance in 2022.

== Summits ==
The first PROSUR Summit, called the "Meeting of Presidents of South America", took place on 22 March 2019 in Santiago, Chile. Eight South American countries taking part (Argentina, Brazil, Chile, Colombia, Ecuador, Guyana, Paraguay and Peru) signed the Declaration of Santiago for the renewal and strengthening of South America, which begins the process of creating of PROSUR. The representatives of Bolivia, Suriname and Uruguay abstained from signing the declaration. Representatives from Venezuela were not invited to the summit in Santiago.

The second PROSUR Summit took place on 12 December 2020; due to the COVID-19 pandemic, it was held virtually. The heads of state of Brazil, Chile, Colombia, Ecuador, Paraguay and Peru participated in the summit, with Prime Minister Mark Phillips of Guyana and President Luis Lacalle Pou of Uruguay invited as special guests. During the summit, the presidency pro tempore was transferred from its inaugural holder, Chilean President Sebastián Piñera to Colombian President Iván Duque. A presidential declaration was adopted to formalize the transfer and promote regional cooperation between its members in matters related to the pandemic.

The third PROSUR summit was held in Cartagena de Indias, Colombia on 26–27 January 2022; the 2022 summit of the Pacific Alliance was also held at the same date and venue. It was attended by five heads of state; its host President Iván Duque of Colombia, President Mario Abdo Benítez of Paraguay, President Guillermo Lasso of Ecuador, Prime Minister Mark Phillips of Guyana and President Sebastián Piñera of Chile. In representation of their respective countries were Vice-president Hamilton Mourão of Brazil and Foreign Minister of Peru Óscar Maúrtua. Argentina sent no delegation, while the President-elect of Chile, Gabriel Boric, declined an invitation by President Sebastián Piñera to attend the two summits in Colombia. During the summit, Mario Abdo Benítez succeeded Iván Duque as president pro tempore but attended the summit virtually due to having tested positive for COVID-19.

Year	#	Date	Place	Host
2019	1st	22 March	Santiago, Chile	Sebastian Piñera
2020	2nd	12 December	Videoconference	Sebastian Piñera
2022	3rd	27 January	Cartagena, Colombia	Iván Duque Márquez

There have also been numerous extraordinary meetings;

Year	#	Date	Place	Host
2020	1st	16 March	Videoconference	Sebastian Piñera
2020	2nd	6 April	Videoconference	Sebastian Piñera
2020	3rd	19 May	Videoconference	Sebastian Piñera
2020	4th	27 August	Videoconference	Sebastian Piñera
2021	5th	25 February	Videoconference	Iván Duque Márquez
2021	6th	16 March	Videoconference	Iván Duque Márquez

== President pro tempore ==
The presidency is exercised for a period of one year and will be rotated among the member countries between each PROSUR meeting. Since January 2022, the current president pro tempore of PROSUR is Paraguayan President Santiago Peña.

No.	President pro tempore	Portrait	Country	Beginning of the mandate	End of the mandate
1	Sebastián Piñera		Chile	22 March 2019	12 December 2020
2	Iván Duque		Colombia	12 December 2020	27 January 2022
3	Mario Abdo Benítez		Paraguay	27 January 2022	15 August 2023
4	Santiago Peña		Paraguay	15 August 2023	Incumbent

== See also ==
- Andean Community
- Conservative wave
- Mercosur
- Union of South American Nations
