= Union of South American Nations =

Intergovernmental regional organization

Coordinates: 0°0′16″S 78°27′14″W

(in other official languages)
| Spanish | Unión de Naciones Suramericanas |
| Dutch | Unie van Zuid-Amerikaanse Naties |
| Portuguese | União de Nações Sul-Americanas |
- Flag Logo
- Motto: "Soy del Sur" (I am from the South)
- Member states Suspended member states Former member states
- Administrative centers: Vacant (Secretariat); Cochabamba, Bolivia (Parliament)
- Official languages: Spanish; Portuguese; English; Dutch
- Demonym: South American
- Type: Continental union
- Membership: 8 members: Argentina; Bolivia; Brazil; Colombia; Guyana; Peru (suspended); Suriname; Venezuela; 2 observers: Mexico; Panama

Leaders
  - President: Vacant
  - Secretary General: Vacant
- Legislature: South American Parliament
- Establishment: Formation
  - Cusco Declaration: 8 December 2004
  - Constitutive Treaty: 23 May 2008
  - Treaty in force: 11 March 2011
- Currency: 6 currencies: (Argentina) Peso; (Bolivia) Boliviano; (Brazil) Real; (Colombia) Peso; (Guyana) Dollar; (Peru) Sol; (Suriname) Dollar; (Venezuela) Bolívar
- Time zone: UTC−05 to −03
- Calling code: see list
- Internet TLD: 6 TLDs: (Argentina) .ar; (Bolivia) .bo; (Brazil) .br; (Colombia) .co; (Guyana) .gy; (Peru) .pe; (Suriname) .sr; (Venezuela) .ve
- Website www.unasursg.org
- Notes^S: Membership suspended

The Union of South American Nations (USAN), (Note: Spanish: Unión de Naciones Suramericanas, UNASUR; Portuguese: União de Nações Sul-Americanas, UNASUL; Dutch: Unie van Zuid-Amerikaanse Naties, UZAN) sometimes also referred to as the South American Union, abbreviated in Spanish as UNASUR and in Portuguese as UNASUL, is an intergovernmental regional organization. It was set up by Hugo Chávez to counteract the influence of the United States in the region.

The UNASUR Constitutive Treaty was signed on 23 May 2008, at the Third Summit of Heads of State, held in Brasília, Brazil. According to the Constitutive Treaty, the Union's headquarters will be located in Quito, Ecuador. On 1 December 2010, Uruguay became the ninth state to ratify the UNASUR treaty, thus giving the union full legality. As the Constitutive Treaty entered into force on 11 March 2011, UNASUR became a legal entity during a meeting of Foreign Ministers in Mitad del Mundo, Ecuador, where they had laid the foundation stone for the Secretariat Headquarters.

In April 2018, six countries—Argentina, Brazil, Chile, Colombia, Paraguay and Peru —suspended their membership, and in August of the same year, Colombia announced its withdrawal from the organization. In March 2019, Brazil's president Jair Bolsonaro announced his country's intention to withdraw from the organization. On 13 March 2019, Ecuador announced that it would withdraw from the organization. The president of the country, Lenin Moreno, also asked the bloc to return the headquarters building of the organization, based in Quito. On 10 March 2020, Uruguay officially announced its withdrawal from the organization. Argentina rejoined on 6 April 2023. Brazil rejoined on 5 May 2023. Colombia rejoined on 5 December 2023.

In January 2019, amid growing concern about Venezuela's Nicolás Maduro, a new group, PROSUL/PROSUR, was advanced to counteract the influence of what countries in the region call a dictatorship in Venezuela. A Chilean summit to organize PROSUL was held on 22 March 2019, and excluded Venezuela. Argentina, Brazil, Bolivia, Colombia, Chile, Ecuador, Uruguay, Paraguay, Peru, Guyana and Suriname were invited to join the new regional bloc.

== Overview ==
At the Third South American Summit on 8 December 2004, presidents or representatives from 12 South American nations signed the Cusco Declaration, a two-page statement of intent announcing the foundation of the South American Community. Panama and Mexico attended the signing ceremony as observers in Brazil.

The mechanics of the new entity came out of the First South American Community of Nations Heads of State Summit, which was held in Brasília on 29–30 September 2005. An important operating condition of UNASUR is that no new institutions will be created in the first phase, so as not to increase bureaucracy, and the community will use the existing institutions belonging to the previous trade blocs.

== History ==
=== Background ===
Between the 15th and 19th centuries, the Spanish and Portuguese colonization brought about the establishment and development of colonial empires in the Americas that integrated politically, economically and culturally vast extensions of the continent each with their respective metropolis.

Since the Spanish American wars of independence a trend towards the political integration of the newly born republics of Hispanic America became strong in the thinking of several independence leaders, influenced in turn by the Spanish Enlightenment and the French and American revolutions. A notable early exponent of this trend was Francisco de Miranda, who envisioned a federated republic encompassing all of Hispanic America, which he called "Colombia".

The independence war efforts saw the concurrence of integrated armies composed by Spanish Americans of diverse regions on both sides of the conflict (v.g. Patriots and Royalists), and fighting all over the territories of many future nations. For example, the Army of the Andes which was gathered in the United Provinces of the River Plate fought in Chile, Peru and Ecuador, and later integrated with Simón Bolívar's Army (which itself included troops of future Venezuela, Colombia and Ecuador) to further fight in Peru and the Upper Peru.

By the 1820s, the main proponent of a federation of the newly born republics was Simón Bolívar, although this idea was shared by many notable contemporaries, including José de San Martín and Bernardo de Monteagudo, under either republican or constitutional monarchical governments. In 1826, Bolívar summoned a conference to be held in Panama, which was to be known as the "Amphictyonic" Congress of Panama because of the parallelism with the Hellenic Amphictyonic League. The Congress was attended by Gran Colombia (including present-day Colombia, Venezuela, Panama and Ecuador), the Federal Republic of Central America (including present-day Costa Rica, Nicaragua, El Salvador, Honduras and Guatemala), the United Mexican States, and Peru. The ostensible intention was to form a defensive league that could prevent foreign expansionism and foster the interests of the Spanish American republics. The Congress' conclusions, however, were not ratified by the participants, except for Gran Colombia. Soon after, both Gran Colombia and the United Provinces of Central America fell apart and the whole of Hispanic America was balkanized by competing national governments.

By the 1990s, however, Brazil had consolidated as the most powerful country in South America (accounting for half of the regional GDP) and began to promote the notion of a united South America (a new regional framing) where Brasília would be pivotal. The project did not take hold until the United States' foreign policy priorities turned to other regions in the 2000s.

=== Formation ===
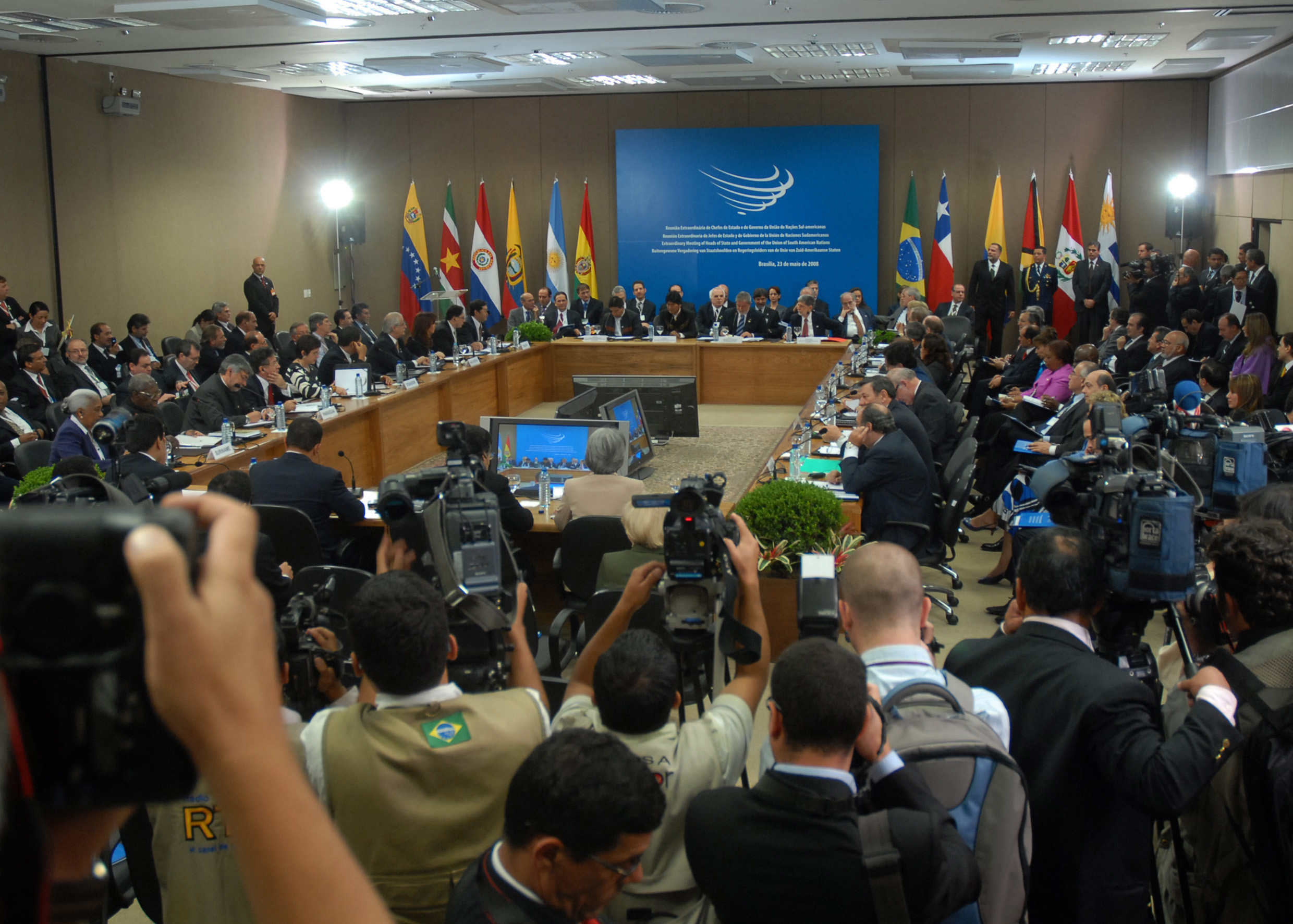
South American presidents gathered during an extraordinary meeting for the signing of the UNASUR Constitutive Treaty in May 2008 in Brasília

The complete integration between the Andean Community and the Mercosur nations was formalized during the meeting of South American heads of state that took place on 23 May 2008 in Brasília.

In the 2004 South American Summit, representatives of twelve South American nations signed the Cuzco Declaration, a two-page letter of intent announcing the establishment of the then-named "South American Community of Nations". Panama and Mexico were present as observers. The leaders announced the intention of modeling the new community in the mold of the European Union, including a unified passport, a parliament and, eventually, a single currency. The then Secretary General of the Andean Community Allan Wagner speculated that an advanced union such as the EU should be possible within the next fifteen years.

After Argentina, Bolivia, Chile, Ecuador, Guyana, Peru, Suriname and Venezuela, Uruguay became the ninth nation to ratify the constitutive treaty of the organization on 1 December 2010, thus completing the minimum number of ratifications Necessary for the entry into force of the Treaty, on 11 March 2011 With the entry into force of the Treaty, UNASUR became a legal entity during the Summit Ministers of Foreign Affairs, in Mitad del Mundo, Ecuador, where the cornerstone was laid for the headquarters of the General Secretariat of the Union.

=== Naming ===
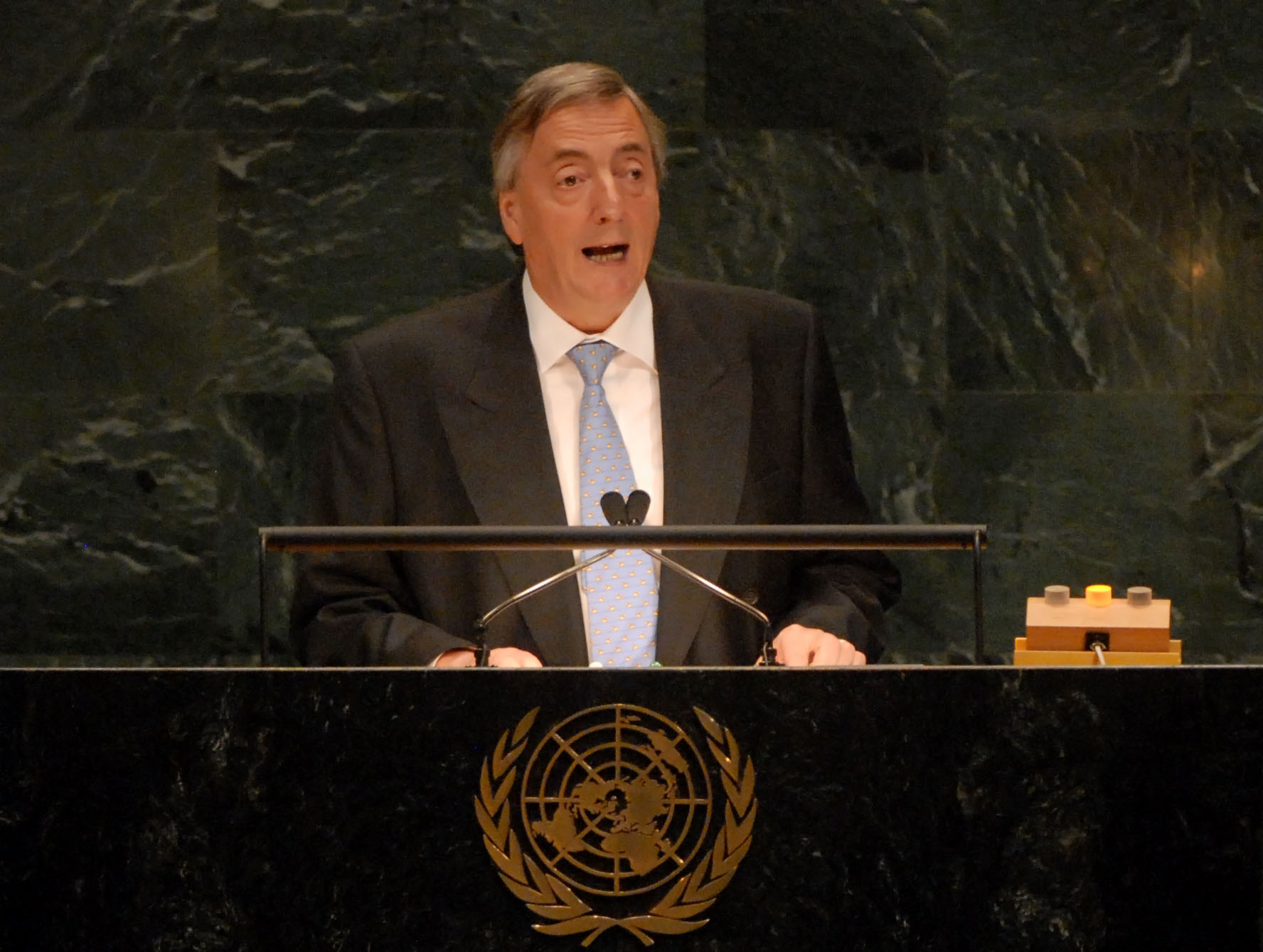
Néstor Kirchner, first Secretary General of UNASUR

On 28 December 2005, Chilean former foreign minister Ignacio Walker proposed that the Union's former designation, the South American Community of Nations, abbreviated as CSN, be changed to South American Union; nevertheless, many members responded that that proposal had already been rejected to prevent confusion since its acronym of U.S.A. (Spanish: Unión Sudamericana) would be easily confused for the United States of America. In the press, the phrase "United States of South America" was bandied about as an analogy to the United States to reflect the economic and political power that the union would have on the world stage.

The name was finally changed on 16 April 2007 to Union of South American Nations. The new name was jointly agreed by all member states during the first day of meeting at the First South American Energy Summit, held at Isla Margarita, Venezuela.

=== Leadership crisis ===
After Colombian Ernesto Samper completed his term as Secretary General in January 2017, the UNASUR governments have been unable to reach consensus on the organization's future leadership. Venezuela, with the support of Bolivia and Suriname, has blocked the nomination of Argentine diplomat José Octavio Bordón.

In August 2017, six members of UNASUR—Argentina, Brazil, Chile, Colombia, Paraguay and Peru—joined in forming the Lima Group, a coalition of Western Hemisphere nations that repudiates the Venezuela government of Nicolás Maduro as antidemocratic. In February 2018, Maduro was disinvited from the Summit of the Americas hosted by Peru (held in Lima in April 2018). In response, Bolivia's president Evo Morales urged UNASUR to defend Venezuela, stating "UNASUR should call an emergency meeting and enforce the sovereignty of a brotherly people." Morales acceded to the rotating role of president pro tempore of UNASUR on 17 April 2018.

On 20 April 2018, six countries—Argentina, Brazil, Chile, Colombia, Paraguay and Peru—announced that they would suspend their own membership for a year until the regional group became more organized. Chilean Foreign Minister Roberto Ampuero stated that the organization "isn't getting anywhere, there is no integration" and that "We can't be throwing this money to an institution that doesn't work." A briefing sent to the Brazilian cabinet stated that the countries share the view that Bolivia's leadership of the block has been ineffective. Paraguayan Foreign Minister stated that his country's objection concerned the failure to put a new Secretary General in place, and the need to make the organization less ideological, but did not reflect negatively on Bolivia's leadership. Bolivian Foreign Minister Fernando Huanacuni called an emergency meeting for May 2018 to attempt to resolve the crisis.

=== Countries renouncing the treaty ===
==== Colombia ====
On 28 August 2018, Colombian president Iván Duque announced that foreign minister Carlos Holmes had officially notified UNASUR of their intention to leave the bloc within the next 6 months, denouncing it as an institution created by Hugo Chávez to sideline existing international treaties and referring to it as an accomplice to what they referred to as the dictatorship in Venezuela. However, in 2023 the country announced that it would rejoin UNASUR.

==== Brazil ====
On 7 March 2019 Brazilian president Jair Bolsonaro announced that Brazil would withdraw from UNASUR and join the newly created PROSUR. Following the 2022 Brazilian general election, newly elected president Luiz Inácio Lula da Silva signalled his intention to rejoin UNASUR. It rejoined effective 5 May 2023.

==== Ecuador ====
On 13 March 2019 Ecuadorian president Lenin Moreno announced that Ecuador would withdraw from UNASUR and join the newly created PROSUR. Moreno also asked the bloc to return the headquarters building of the organization, based in Quito, so it can be handed over to PROSUR.

==== Argentina ====
On 12 April 2019 Argentine president Mauricio Macri announced that Argentina would withdraw from UNASUR and join the newly created PROSUR. However, the country rejoined UNASUR in April 2023. Following the 2023 Argentine general election, new president Javier Milei raised the possibility of Argentina withdrawing again.

==== Uruguay ====
On 11 March 2020 Uruguayan president Luis Lacalle Pou announced that Uruguay would withdraw from UNASUR.

== Structure ==
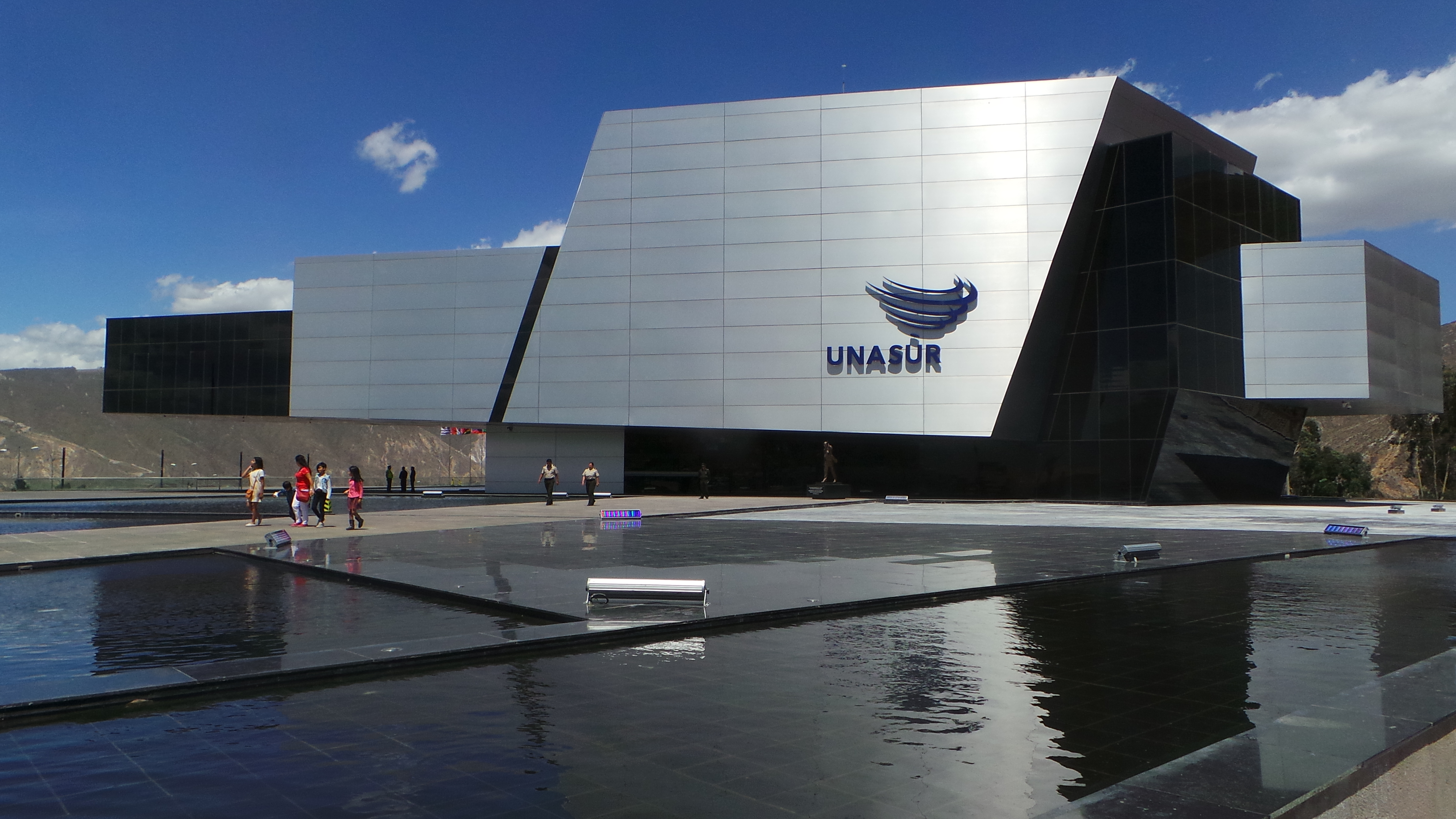
Former headquarters of UNASUR

The presidents of each member nation had an annual meeting, which was the top political mandate. The first meeting was held in Brasília on 29 and 30 September 2005. The second meeting was held in Cochabamba, Bolivia, on 8 and 9 December 2006. The third meeting was held in Brasília – this meeting should have taken place in Cartagena (Colombia), but was postponed because of tension between Ecuador, Colombia and Venezuela. It was at this meeting that UNASUR was formalized and in which the Constitutive Treaty of the organization was signed.

The foreign ministers of each country met once every six months. They made concrete proposals for action and executive decision. The Permanent Representative Committee of the President of Mercosur and the Director of the Mercosur Department, the Secretary General of the Andean Community, the Secretary General of ALADI and the Permanent Secretaries of any institution for regional cooperation and integration, Amazon Cooperation Treaty Organization, among others, also attended these meetings.

On 9 December 2005, the Strategic Reflection Commission on the South American Integration Process was created. It consists of 12 members, whose function is to elaborate proposals that will help in the process of integration among the South American nations. These proposals were to be made at the 2nd UNASUR Meeting (2006).

The South American Parliament will be located in Cochabamba, Bolivia.

The executive committee, created at the 2nd UNASUR Meeting, was transformed into the Political Commission or Council of Deputies, in accordance with the Decisions of the Political Dialogue. The text prepared by heads of state to form UNASUR was approved at the 3rd UNASUR Meeting in Brasília on 23 May 2008. This meeting was scheduled to take place in Cartagena de Indias, Colombia, on 24–28 January 2008, but was postponed because of tensions between Ecuador, Colombia and Venezuela.

=== Secretary General ===
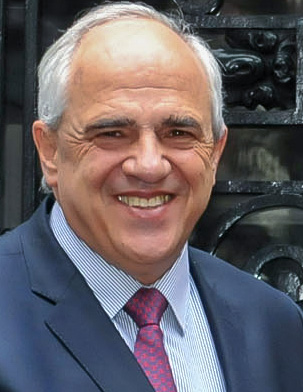
Ernesto Samper, the most recent Secretary General.

A Secretary General is the legal representative of the Secretariat in Quito, Ecuador. Former Ecuadorian president Rodrigo Borja was nominated to this position but resigned a few days before the formation of the USAN in May 2008. On 4 May, Néstor Kirchner of Argentina was appointed as the first Secretary General, despite resistance from Colombia, Uruguay, and Peru. After the death of Néstor Kirchner in 2010, there was a period of time when the position went unfilled, which eventually ended when María Emma Mejía Vélez was elected in March 2011. After Ernesto Samper completed his term in January 2017, UNASUR members have been unable to come to consensus on a successor.

| No. | Secretary General | Country | Beginning of the mandate | End of the mandate |
|---|---|---|---|---|
| 1 | Néstor Kirchner | Argentina | 4 May 2010 | 27 October 2010 |
| — | Interim | | | |
| 2 | María Emma Mejía Vélez | Colombia | 9 May 2011 | 11 June 2012 |
| 3 | Alí Rodríguez Araque | Venezuela | 11 June 2012 | 31 July 2014 |
| 4 | Ernesto Samper | Colombia | 1 August 2014 | 31 January 2017 |
| — | Vacant; No successor approved. | | | |

=== Presidency pro tempore ===
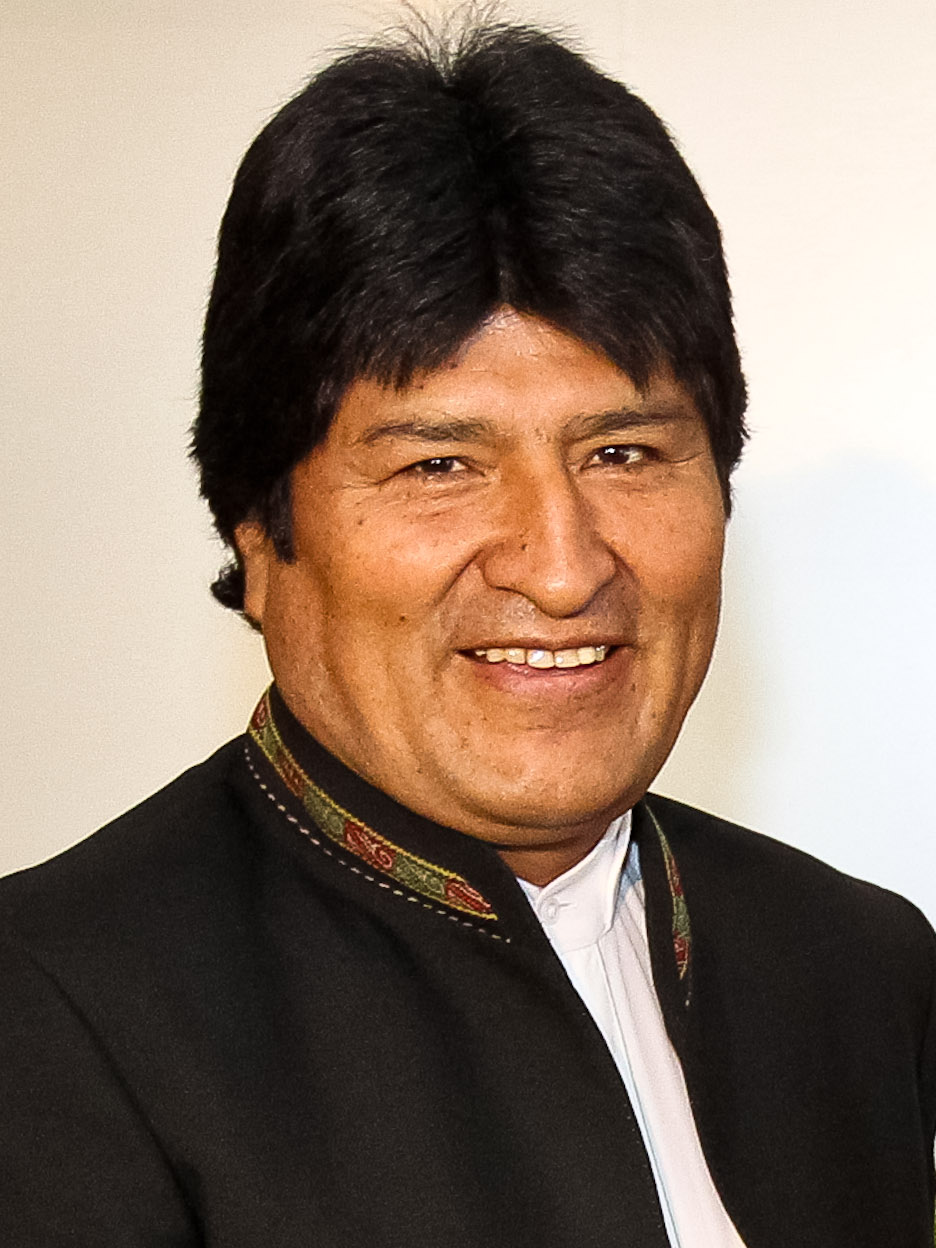
Evo Morales was the most recent President of UNASUR.

The temporary presidency will be governed by a year and will be rotating among the member countries between each UNASUR meeting. According to the document "Decisions of the Political Dialogue", which was signed during the 1st South American Energy Meeting, a permanent general cabinet will be created and headquartered in Quito, Ecuador.

| No. | President pro tempore | Country | Beginning of the Mandate | End of the Mandate |
|---|---|---|---|---|
| 1 | Michelle Bachelet | Chile | 23 May 2008 | 10 August 2009 |
| 2 | Rafael Correa | Ecuador | 10 August 2009 | 26 November 2010 |
| 3 | Bharrat Jagdeo | Guyana | 26 November 2010 | 29 October 2011 |
| 4 | Fernando Lugo | Paraguay | 29 October 2011 | 22 June 2012 |
| 5 | Ollanta Humala | Peru | 22 June 2012 | 30 August 2013 |
| 6 | Dési Bouterse | Suriname | 30 August 2013 | 4 December 2014 |
| 7 | José Mujica | Uruguay | 4 December 2014 | 1 March 2015 |
| 8 | Tabaré Vázquez | Uruguay | 1 March 2015 | 17 April 2016 |
| 9 | Nicolás Maduro | Venezuela | 17 April 2016 | 21 April 2017 |
| 10 | Mauricio Macri | Argentina | 21 April 2017 | 17 April 2018 |
| 11 | Evo Morales | Bolivia | 17 April 2018 | 16 April 2019 |

=== Councils and bodies ===
The organisations of UNASUR are:

- Council of Heads of State and of Government of Unasur
- President Pro Tempore of UNASUR
- Council of Minister of External Relationships of Unasur
- Council of Delegates of Unasur
- Secretary General of UNASUR

==== Ministerial Councils ====
There were twelve Ministerial Councils of the USAN.

- Council of South American Defense
- Electoral Council
- South American Energy Council
- South American Council of Health
- South American Council of Social Development
- South American Council of Infrastructure and Planning
- South American Council of fight against the drug traffic
- South American Council of Economy and Finances
- South American Council of Education
- South American Council of Culture
- South American Council of Science, Technology and Innovation
- South American Council of Citizen Security, Justice and Coordination of Action against Transnational Organized Crime

==== Other institutions ====
- South American Parliament
- Bank of the South
- South American Institute of Government in Health

=== Council of Economy and Finance ===
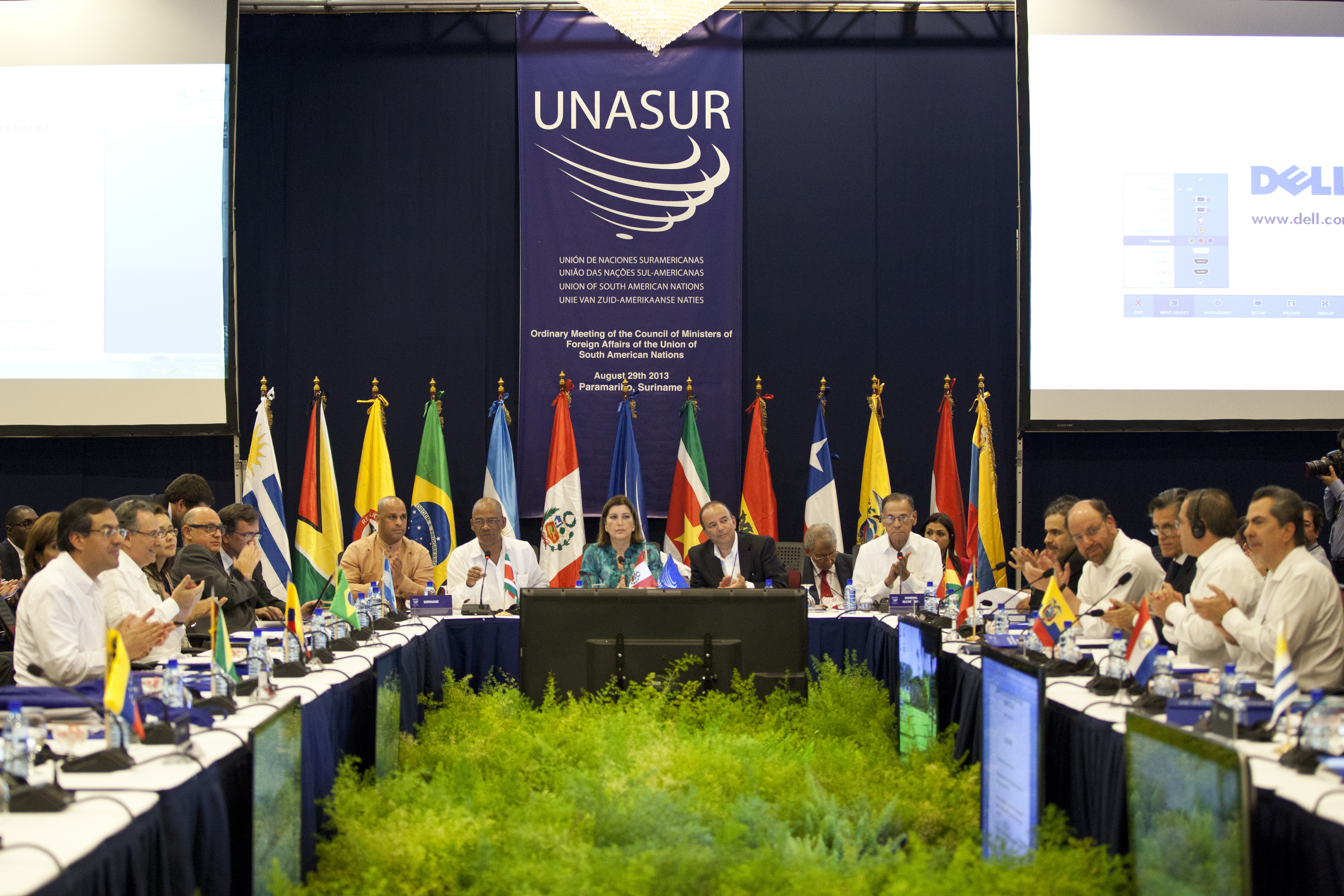
Meeting of Ministers of Foreign Affairs of the members of Unasur.

The Economic and Financial Council of Unasur was established on 12 August 2011, in Buenos Aires, during a meeting of Finance Ministers and representatives of the Central Banks of the twelve countries of the region. Argentine Deputy Economy Minister Roberto Feletti said that the council would study measures to strengthen regional trade in national currencies without the use of dollar. "We have reached an agreement on three axes of work and one of them is to move forward with multilateral payment mechanisms, to sustain trade and protect the volumes of reserves," Feletti said, noting that trade between countries in the region moves 120 billion dollars annually. "The use of national currencies, excluding the dollar, protects reserves and increases trade because there are lower transaction rates." He also detailed plans of the technical groups focused on the development and strengthening of Development Banks, such as CAF – Development Bank of Latin America and the Caribbean and the Bank of the South. He explained that the technicians will review the Latin American Reserve Fund (FLAR), aiming at in order to give greater capacity to intervene to the governments of the bloc in case of speculative attacks against currency or sovereign debt.

=== Council of South American Defense ===
The creation of a Council of South American Defense was proposed by Brazil and discussed for the first time at a summit of the South American presidents in April 2008. The project was extensively discussed throughout 2008. The then Brazilian Defense Minister, Nelson Jobim, said in April 2008 that the council would be formed after the "political" decision of the presidents who participated in the launch of the Union of South American Nations (UNASUR) on 23 May 2008.

On 15 December 2008, at the extraordinary UNASUR summit, the creation of the South American Defense Council was finally approved. This was composed of defense ministers of Argentina, Brazil, Uruguay, Paraguay, Bolivia, Colombia, Ecuador, Peru, Chile, Guyana, Suriname and Venezuela. The Defense Council is responsible for developing joint defense policies, promoting the exchange of personnel among the Armed Forces of each country, conducting joint military exercises, participating in United Nations peace operations, promoting the exchange of analyzes on the world defense scenarios and the integration of industrial bases of military equipment.

=== South American Council of Health ===
The South American Council of Health is a UNASUR body established and approved on 16 December 2008, which brings together health ministers of the member states to develop regional programs in the region. Area of public health to be jointly financed by the South American bloc, to coordinate the energy policy of Unasur. It was created by decision of the Heads of State and Government of UNASUR, meeting extraordinarily in the Coast of Sauipe, Bahia, Brazil in December 2008. It was finally constituted on 21 April 2009 in Santiago, Chile.

It is a permanent council composed of Ministers from UNASUR member countries. This body was created in order to constitute a space of integration concerning health, incorporating efforts and improvements from other mechanisms of regional integration, such as MERCOSUR, ORAS CONHU and ACTO, to promote common policies and coordinated activities among member countries. It is also a consultation and consensus body concerning health, which intends to delve deeply into relevant themes and strengthen public policies aimed at improving the living conditions of the inhabitants of the South American continent.

Since health is an essential right to all human beings and all societies, and it is also a vital component for the development of mankind, the Health Council seeks political and social acceptance regarding the issue, proposing health to be seen as an important booster of cooperation and integration of the bloc's nations, intensifying the coordination of such nations and respecting diversity and interculturalism in the region.

The Health Council aims to strengthen, by establishing a South American political institution with expertise in sanitary issues, the development of solutions to challenges that transcend national borders, developing values and mutual interests among the neighboring countries, thus facilitating the interaction of the Member States health authorities through the exchange of knowledge and technology in the region. The South American Health Council (SHC) is composed of the Health Ministries of Unasur Member States. In order to achieve the council's goals, the Coordinating Committee – responsible for preparing propositions of Agreements and Resolutions – was created. The Presidency of the Health Council is held by the Minister of Health of the country nominated for the Pro Tempore Presidency (PTP) of Unasur. It is in charge of coordinating the activities of all its bodies and managing the Technical Secretary. The Pro Tempore President has a two-year term that may be extended for another two years, being unconditionally succeeded by a president from a different country. The SHC is supported by the Technical Secretary in charge of the Pro Tempore Presidency (PTP) and two countries of the previous and following PTP, in order to ensure the continuity of works. It is technically supported by the South American Institute for Government in Health (ISAGS). Additionally, it is composed of five Technical Groups 1- Health Surveillance and Response; 2- Development of Universal Health Systems; 3- Health Promotion and Action on Social Determinants; 4- Universal Access to Medicines; 5- Human Resources Development and Management) and six Structuring Networks (1- Network of National Institutes of Health (RINS); 2- Network of Health Technical Schools of UNASUR (RETS), 3- Network of National Institutions and Institutes of Cancer (RINC); 4- Network of Public Health Schools of Unasur (RESP); 5- Network of Disasters Risk Management; 6- Network of International Offices and International Cooperation in Health (REDSSUR-ORIS)

The South American Institute of Government in Health (ISAGS) of UNASUR is an intergovernmental entity of public character that has as main objective to promote the exchange, the critical reflection, the knowledge management and the generation of innovations in the field of Health policy and governance.

== Summits ==
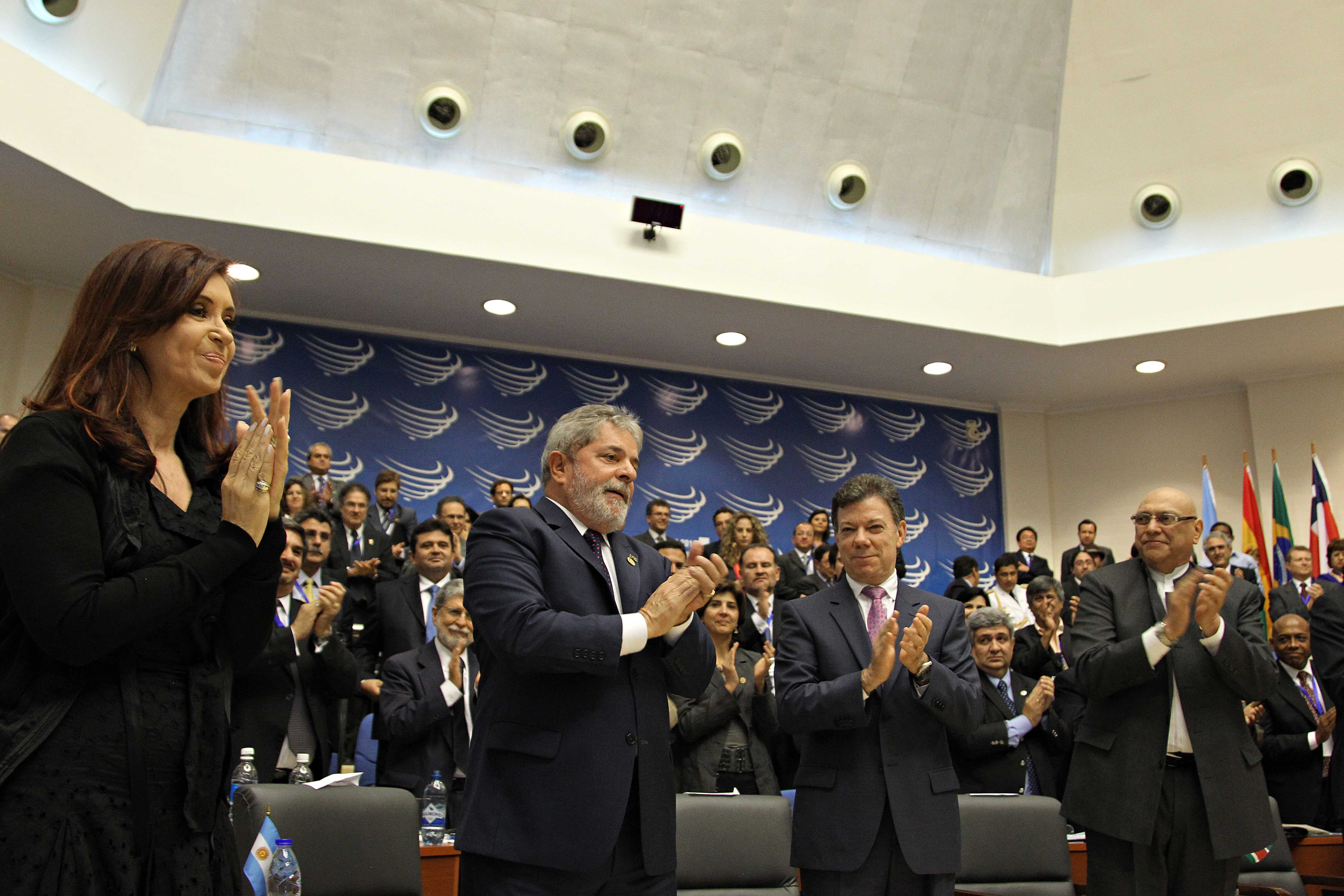
South American leaders during the Unasur 4th Summit, in Georgetown, Guyana.

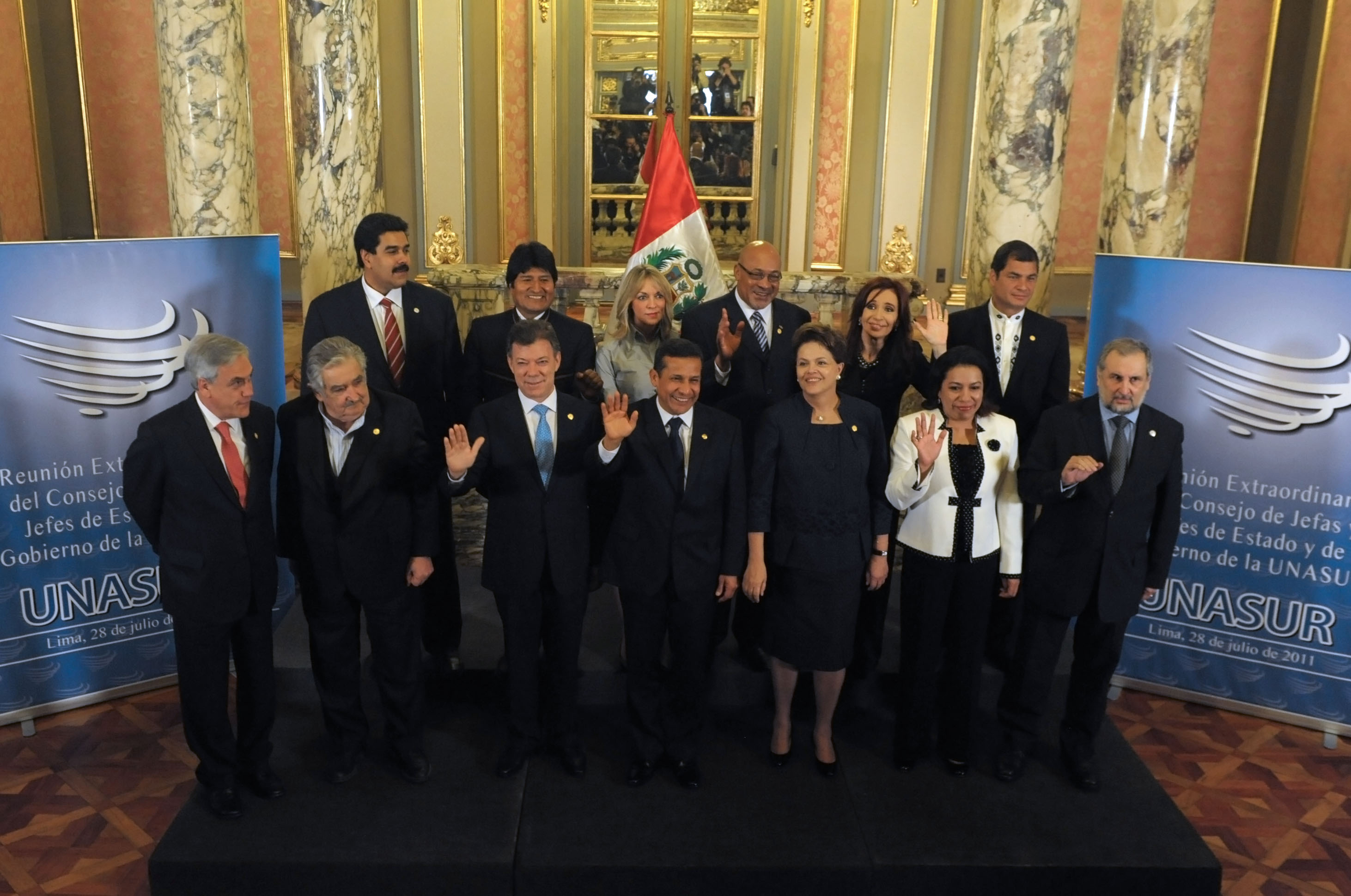
Heads of State at the 5th UNASUR Meeting in Lima, in Peru.

The first Union summit was held in Brasília on 23 May 2008, in which the Constitutive Treaty was signed. Due to the political crisis that Bolivia faced, pro-tempore president Michelle Bachelet convened an emergency summit in Santiago, Chile, on 15 September 2008. The leaders of Argentina, Bolivia, Brazil and Brazil took part in this summit, in addition to President Michelle Bachelet, Colombia, Ecuador, Paraguay, Uruguay and Venezuela and the Secretary General of the OAS, José Miguel Insulza. After a six-hour meeting between the leaders in the Palacio de La Moneda, they finally declared their support for President Evo Morales's government and gave "its absolute support to Bolivia."

| No. | Date | Country | Host | Host leader |
|---|---|---|---|---|
| 1st | 15 September 2008 | Chile | Santiago | Michelle Bachelet |
| 2nd | 10 August 2009 | Ecuador | Quito | Rafael Correa |
| 3rd | 28 August 2009 | Argentina | Bariloche | Cristina Fernández de Kirchner |
| 4th | 26 November 2010 | Guyana | Georgetown | Bharrat Jagdeo |
| 5th | 29 October 2011 | Paraguay | Asunción | Fernando Lugo |
| 6th | 30 November 2012 | Peru | Lima | Ollanta Humala |
| 7th | 30 August 2013 | Suriname | Paramaribo | Dési Bouterse |
| 8th | 4 December 2014 | Ecuador | Guayaquil | Rafael Correa |

- A special UNASUR/BRICS leaders summit was held in Fortaleza, Brazil, in July 2014.
- The 9th Summit, scheduled for 23 April 2016 in Quito, was canceled due to the Ecuador earthquake.

There have been other presidential extraordinary meetings, such as:

- May 2010: Buenos Aires, Argentina. Election of Néstor Kirchner as Secretary General.
- September 2010: Buenos Aires, Argentina. Discussion of the 2010 Ecuador crisis.
- December 2010: Mar del Plata, Argentina. Kirchner's successor after his death. (Concurring with the 20th Ibero-American Summit)
- June 2012: Mendoza, Argentina. Discussion on the Impeachment of Fernando Lugo and suspension of Paraguay. (Concurring with the XLIII Mercosur presidential summit)
- April 2013: Lima, Peru. Recognition of contested Venezuelan presidential elections results.
- July 2013: Cochabamba, Bolivia. Discussion on the Evo Morales "kidnapping" incident in Europe (due to European/US suspicions that the Bolivian Presidential aircraft carried US fugitive Edward Snowden.)

== Demographics ==
At its peak of membership, UNASUR had a total population of 410 million inhabitants and a rate of population growth of about 0.6% per year. There were several different ecological regions such as tropical forests, the Atacama Desert and the icy portions of Patagonia. On the other hand, the continent presents regions of high population density, such as the great urban centers. The population is formed by descendants of Europeans (mainly Spaniards, Portuguese and Italians), Africans and indigenous. There is a high percentage of mestizos that vary greatly in composition according to each place. There is also a minor population of Asians, especially in Brazil. The two main languages are by far Spanish and Portuguese, followed by French, English and Dutch in smaller numbers. Economically, Brazil, Argentina and Colombia are the wealthiest and most developed nations in the continent.

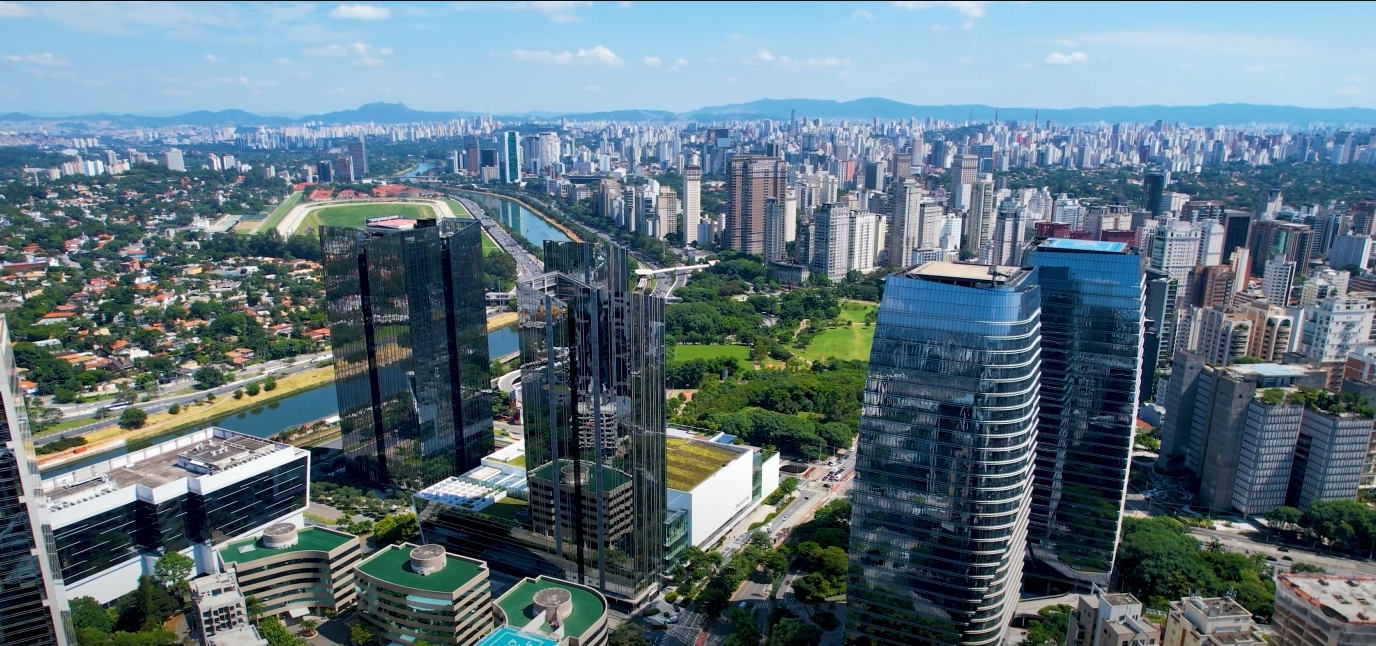
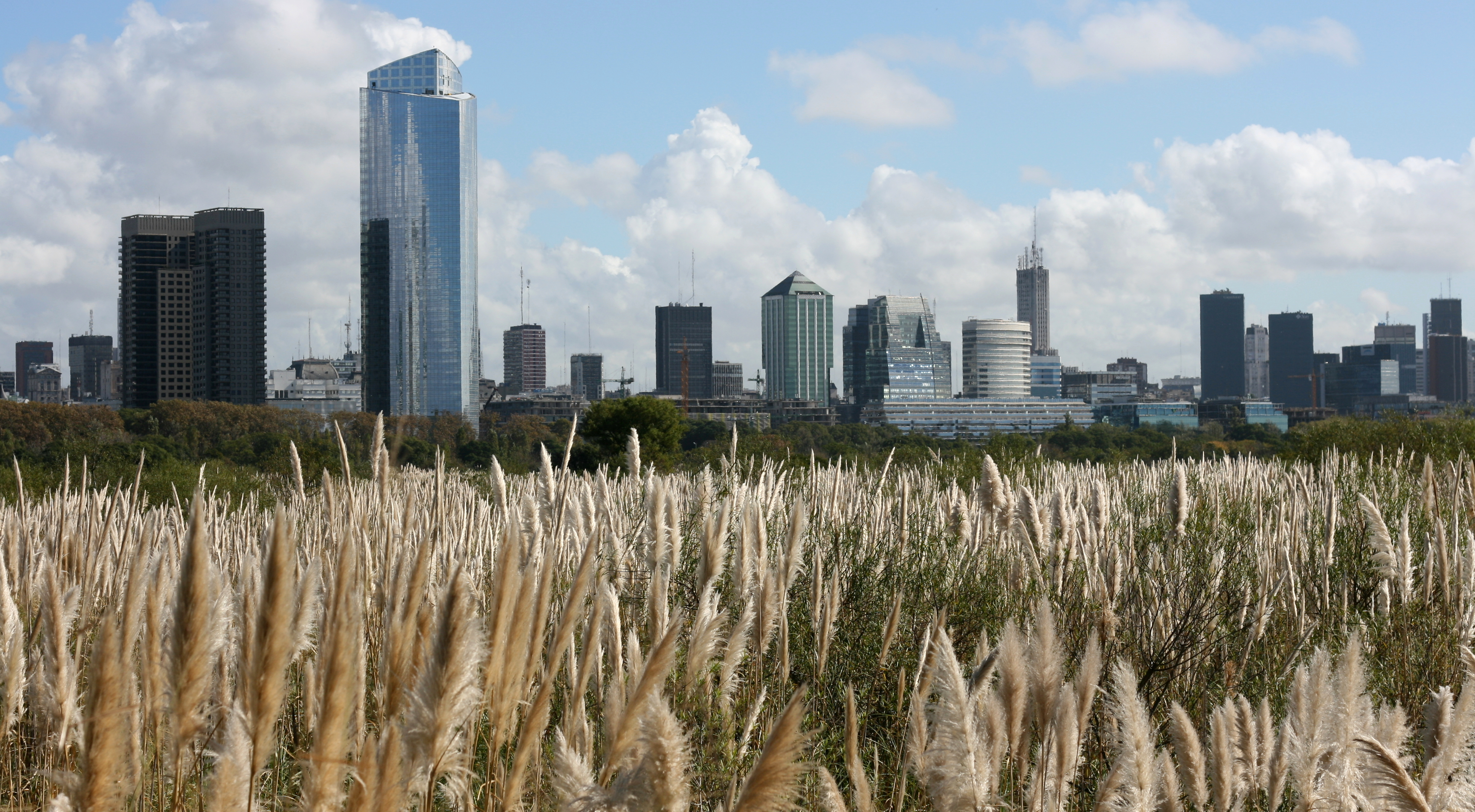
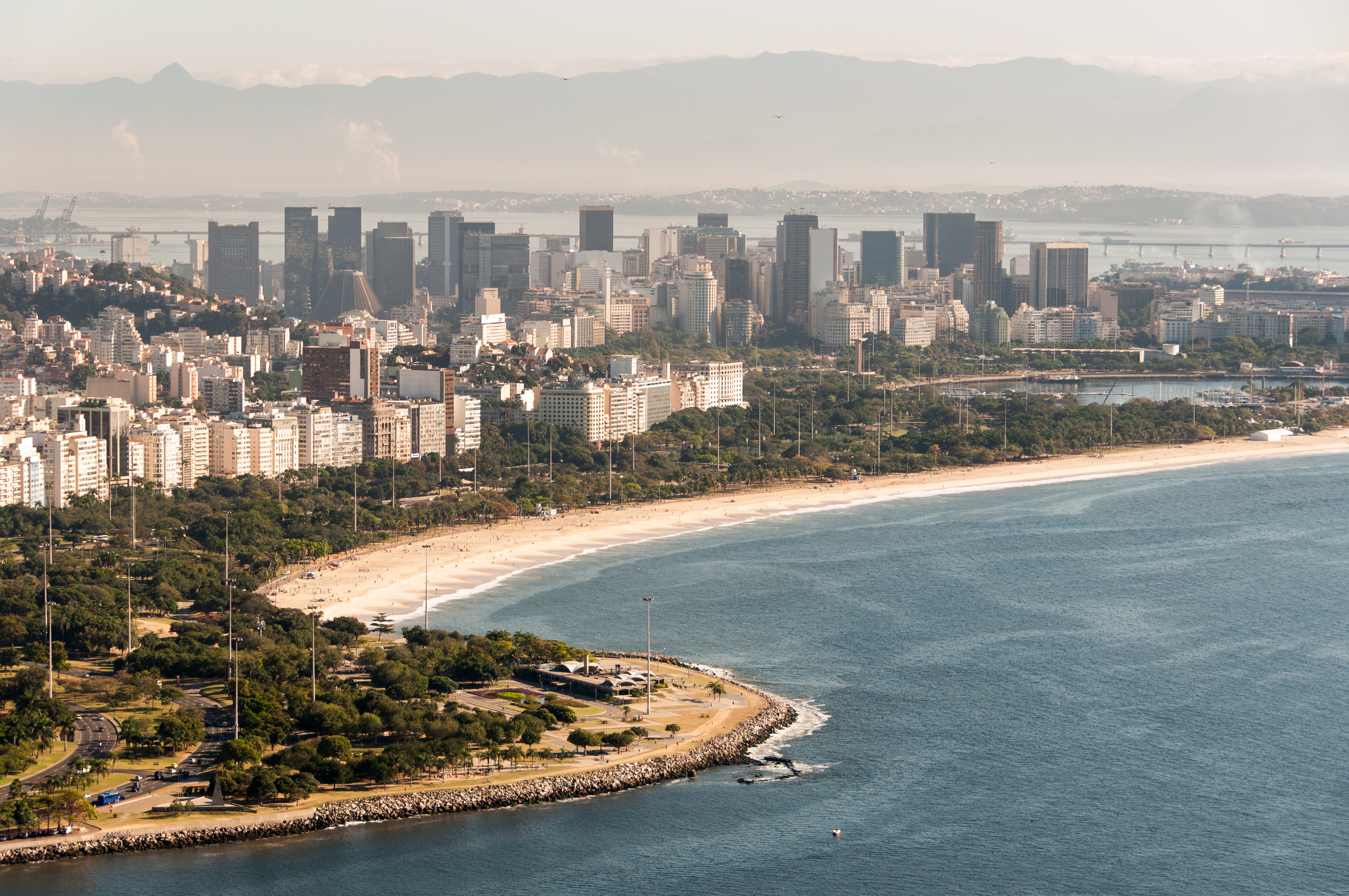
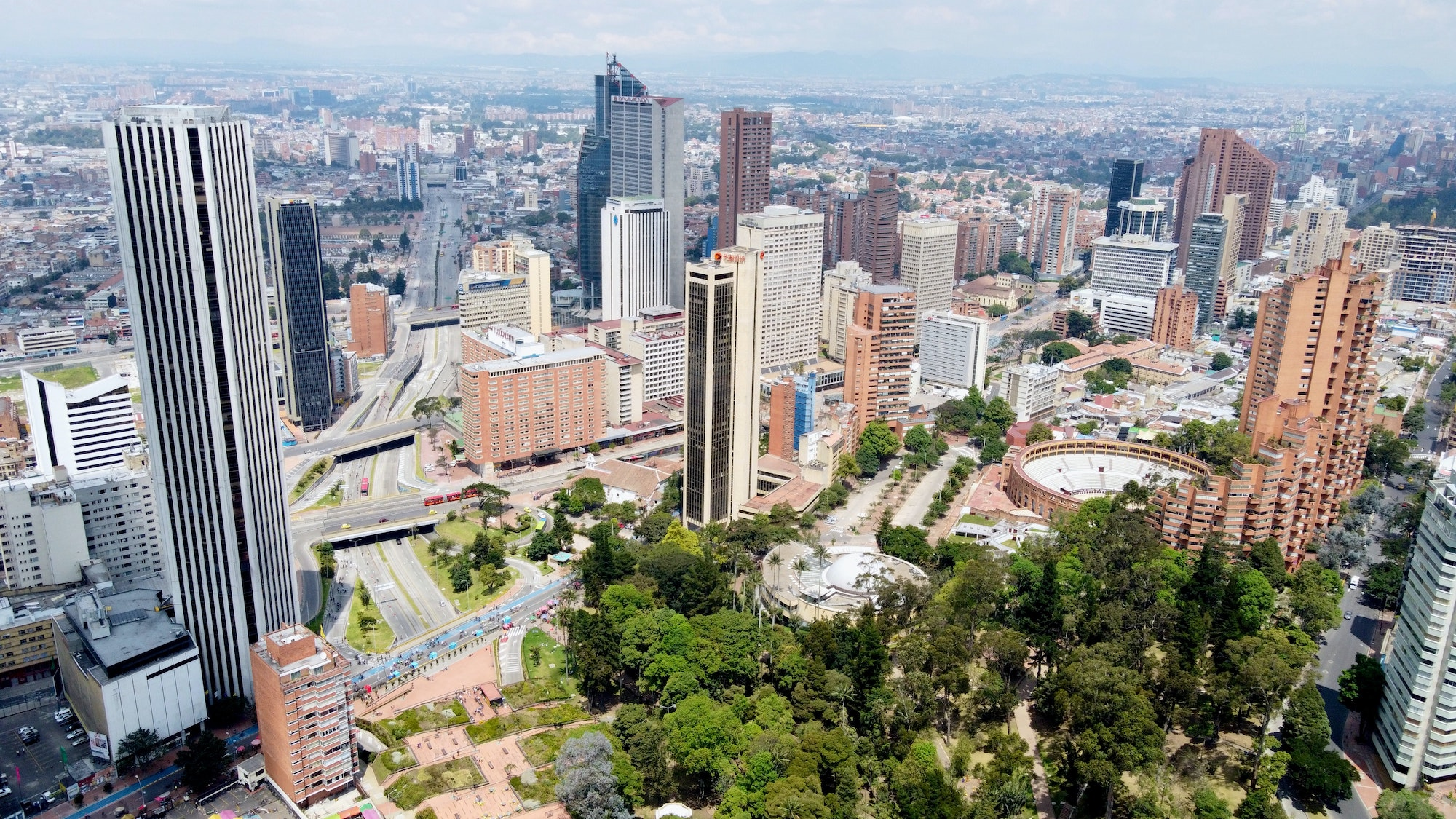
Largest population centres of South America by metropolitan area
| | Rank | City name | Member state | Pop. | Rank | City name | Member state | Pop. |
|---|---|---|---|---|---|---|---|---|---|
| São Paulo Buenos Aires | 1 | São Paulo | Brazil | 21,090,792 | 11 | Fortaleza | Brazil | 3,985,297 | Rio de Janeiro Bogotá |
| São Paulo Buenos Aires | 2 | Buenos Aires | Argentina | 13,693,657 | 12 | Salvador | Brazil | 3,953,290 | Rio de Janeiro Bogotá |
| São Paulo Buenos Aires | 3 | Rio de Janeiro | Brazil | 13,131,431 | 13 | Recife | Brazil | 3,914,397 | Rio de Janeiro Bogotá |
| São Paulo Buenos Aires | 4 | Bogotá | Colombia | 10,777,931 | 14 | Medellín | Colombia | 3,777,009 | Rio de Janeiro Bogotá |
| São Paulo Buenos Aires | 5 | Lima | Peru | 9,904,727 | 15 | Curitiba | Brazil | 3,502,804 | Rio de Janeiro Bogotá |
| São Paulo Buenos Aires | 6 | Santiago | Chile | 6,683,852 | 16 | Campinas | Brazil | 3,094,181 | Rio de Janeiro Bogotá |
| São Paulo Buenos Aires | 7 | Belo Horizonte | Brazil | 5,829,923 | 17 | Guayaquil | Ecuador | 2,952,159 | Rio de Janeiro Bogotá |
| São Paulo Buenos Aires | 8 | Caracas | Venezuela | 5,322,310 | 18 | Cali | Colombia | 2,911,278 | Rio de Janeiro Bogotá |
| São Paulo Buenos Aires | 9 | Porto Alegre | Brazil | 4,258,926 | 19 | Quito | Ecuador | 2,653,330 | Rio de Janeiro Bogotá |
| São Paulo Buenos Aires | 10 | Brasília | Brazil | 4,201,737 | 20 | Maracaibo | Venezuela | 2,576,836 | Rio de Janeiro Bogotá |

=== Languages ===
Portuguese, Spanish, English and Dutch are the official languages of UNASUR. Spanish is the official language of Bolivia and Venezuela. Dutch is the official language of Suriname; English is the official language of Guyana.

Indigenous languages of UNASUR include Wayuunaiki in northwestern Venezuela (Zulia) and Guaraní, Quechua and Aymara in Bolivia. At least three South American indigenous languages (Quechua, Aymara, and Guarani) are recognized along with Spanish as national languages.

Other languages found in UNASUR include, Hindustani and Javanese in Suriname; Italian in Venezuela. Arabic speakers, often of Lebanese, Syrian, or Arab Palestinian descent, can be found in Arab communities in Venezuela.

=== Religion ===
An estimated 87% of South Americans are Christians (69% Roman Catholic, 18% other Christian denominations mainly Traditional Protestants and Evangelicals but also Orthodoxy), accounting for 20% of Christians worldwide.

Due to the immigration of Indonesian workers, Suriname and Guyana have a large Hindu and Muslim community. Also Kardecist Spiritism can be found in several countries along with Afro-American religions.

Religion in UNASUR
| Countries | Christians | Roman Catholics | Other Christians | Other religions | No religion (atheists and agnostics) |
|---|---|---|---|---|---|
| Bolivia | 96% | 74% | 22% | 0% | 4% |
| Guyana | 57% | 7% | 50% | 40% | 3% |
| Suriname | 48% | 22% | 26% | 42% | 10% |
| Venezuela | 88% | 71% | 17% | 4% | 8% |

== Economy ==
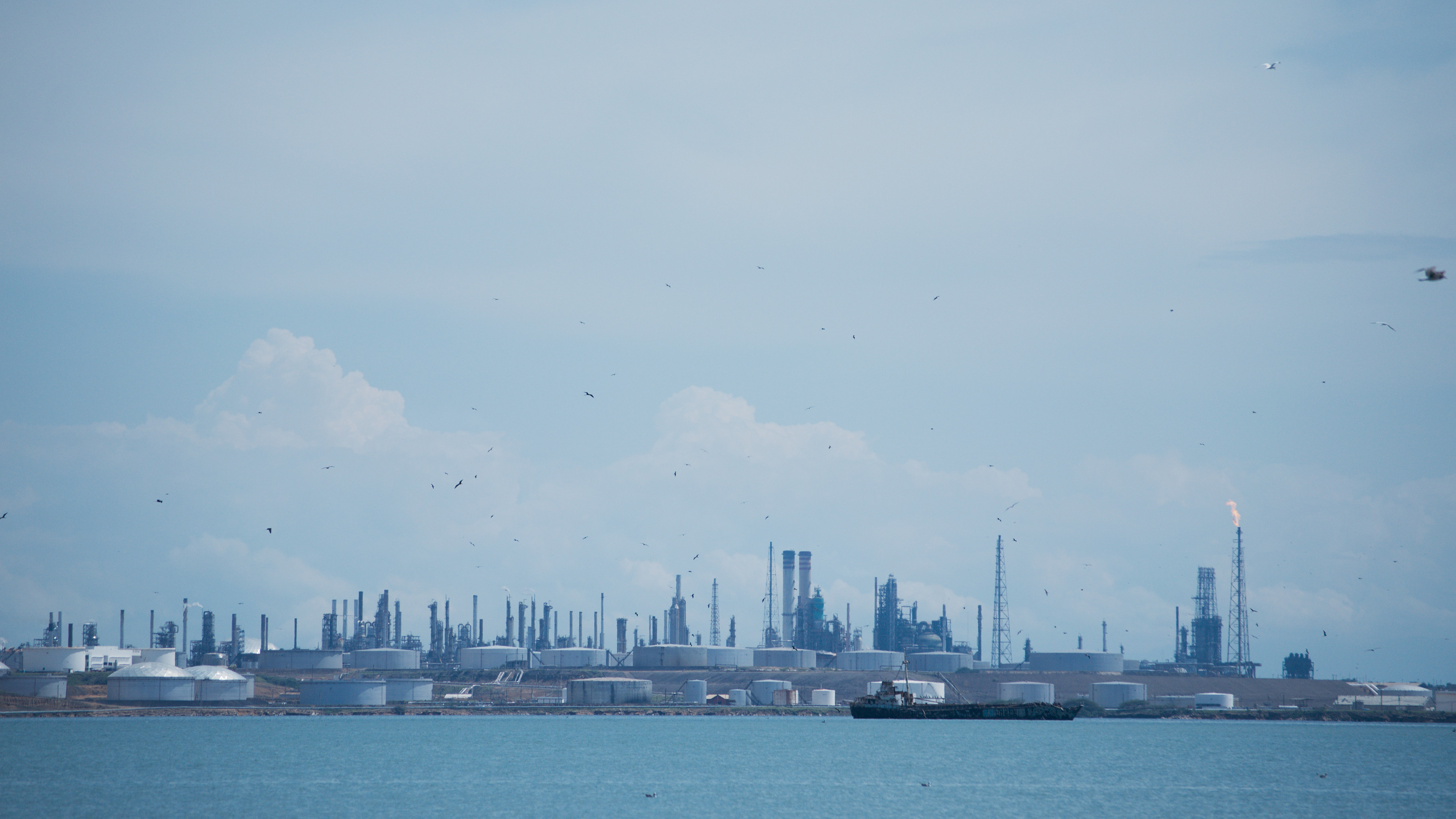
Paraguaná Refinery Complex, considered the second largest and largest capacity in the world.

The economy of UNASUR is divided between the mineral extractivism in the Amazon region and the agriculture present in practically all its States. Industrialization is of medium level to high in diverse regions, although very strong the presence of local industries of origin Foreign (multinational). The extraction and export of oil is notable in Venezuela, which owns the largest world reserves. Bolivia stands out for the production of natural gas, with important reserves of this matter that in recent years have led to what has been known as the "Gas War."

The highest nominal GDP in 2018 was Venezuela (62nd worldwide) with 96,328 billion dollars, followed by Bolivia (92nd at the global level) with 41,833 billion dollars.

The highest GDP in 2018 was in Venezuela (52nd worldwide) with 330,984 billion dollars, and Bolivia (88th worldwide) with 88,866 billion dollars.

The highest GDP per capita in 2018 was held by Suriname with 13,876, followed by Venezuela with 12,388. In terms of nominal per capita GDP, the ranking was headed by Venezuela with US$6,890, and Suriname with US$5,869.

=== Common Market ===
Members of UNASUR and main regional highways.

One of the initiatives of Unasur is the creation of a common market, starting with the elimination of tariffs for products considered non-sensitive until 2014 and for sensitive products until 2019.

The Initiative for the Integration of the Regional Infrastructure of South America is currently underway, with investments estimated at US$38 billion from the Inter-American Development Bank, the Andean Development Corporation, the National Bank for Economic and Social Development and the Financial Fund for Development of the Plata Basin.

The initial integration plans through the infrastructure cooperation of UNASUR came with the construction of the Bioceanic Corridor and the Interoceanic Highway. The Pacific Highway, between Peru and Brazil, began to be built in September 2005, financed 60% by Brazil and 40% by Peru, and was completed in December 2010.

=== Economic development ===
Selection of GDP PPP data (top 10 countries and blocks) in no particular order

Presidents of the seven founding countries (Argentina, Bolivia, Brazil, Ecuador, Paraguay, Venezuela and Uruguay) officially launched the South American Bank in Buenos Aires in December 2007. The heads of all the founding countries were at the ceremony, with the exception of President Tabaré Vázquez of Uruguay. The capital will be US$7b, with Venezuela responsible for US$3b and Brazil US$2b. The headquarters will be located in Caracas with offices in Buenos Aires and La Paz.

The Bank of the South will finance economic development projects to improve local competitiveness and to promote the scientific and technological development of the member states. Its founding charter affirms that the bank will promote projects in a "stable and equal" manner and priorities will be oriented towards reinforcing South American integration, reducing asymmetries, and promoting an egalitarian distribution of investments.

The Brazilian Minister, Guido Mantega, stated that the bank is not similar to the International Monetary Fund; it will be a credit institution similar to the World Bank.

=== Monetary policy ===
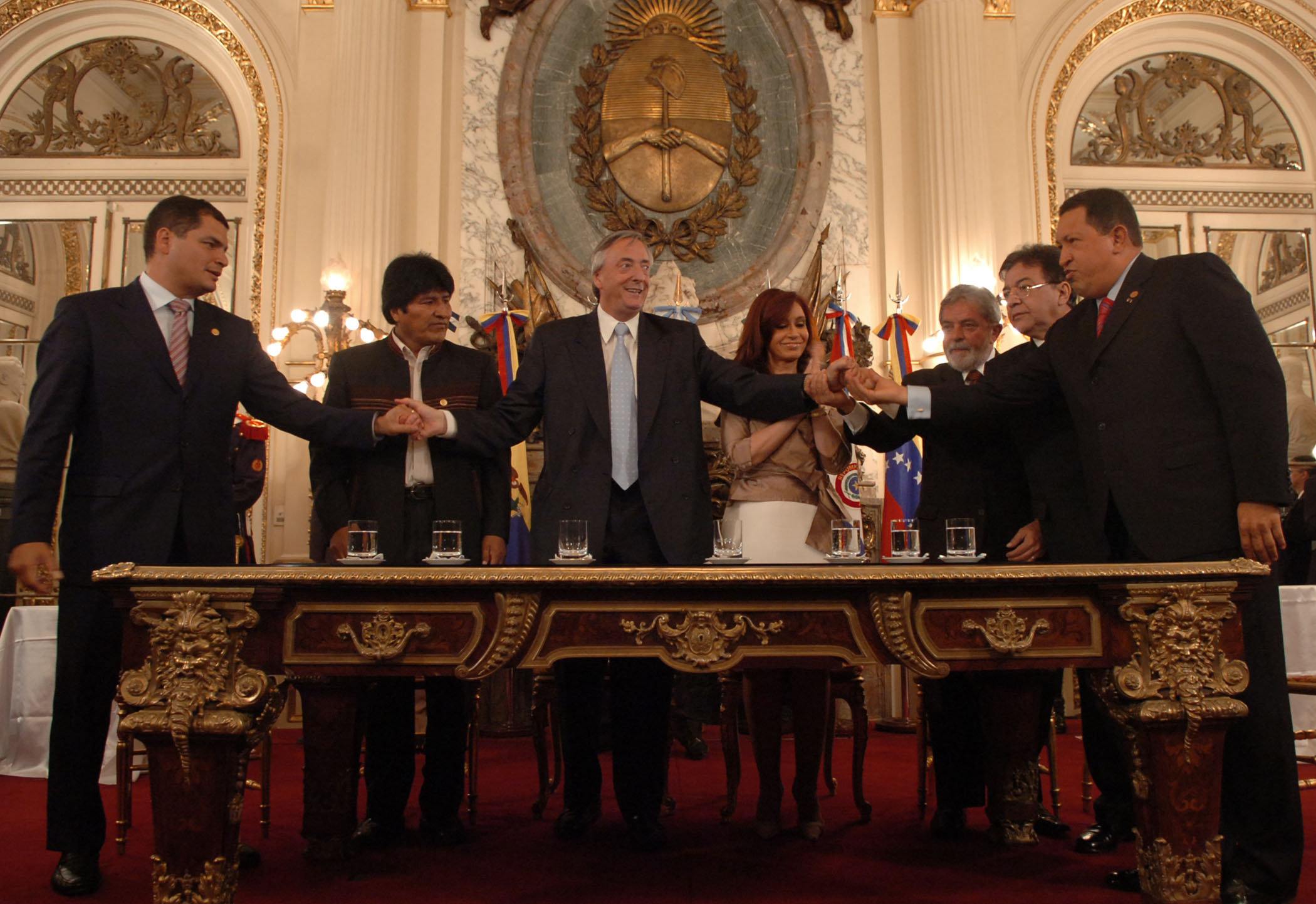
Rafael Correa, Evo Morales, Néstor Kirchner, Cristina Fernández, Luiz Inácio Lula da Silva, Nicanor Duarte, and Hugo Chávez at the signing of the founding charter of the Bank of the South

The Bank of the South (Portuguese: Banco do Sul, Spanish: Banco del Sur, Dutch: Bank van het Zuiden, English: Bank of the South) will establish monetary policy and finance development projects. One of the objectives of monetary union is to establish a Single South American currency. Support for the creation of this currency was provided in January 2007 by Peruvian President Alan García, and other South American authorities expressed themselves in favor, as Bolivian President Evo Morales in April of that year, who proposed that the currency Only one denominated "Pacha" ("earth" in Quechua language), however, except for the right of each country to suggest a name for the common currency.

== Defense policy ==
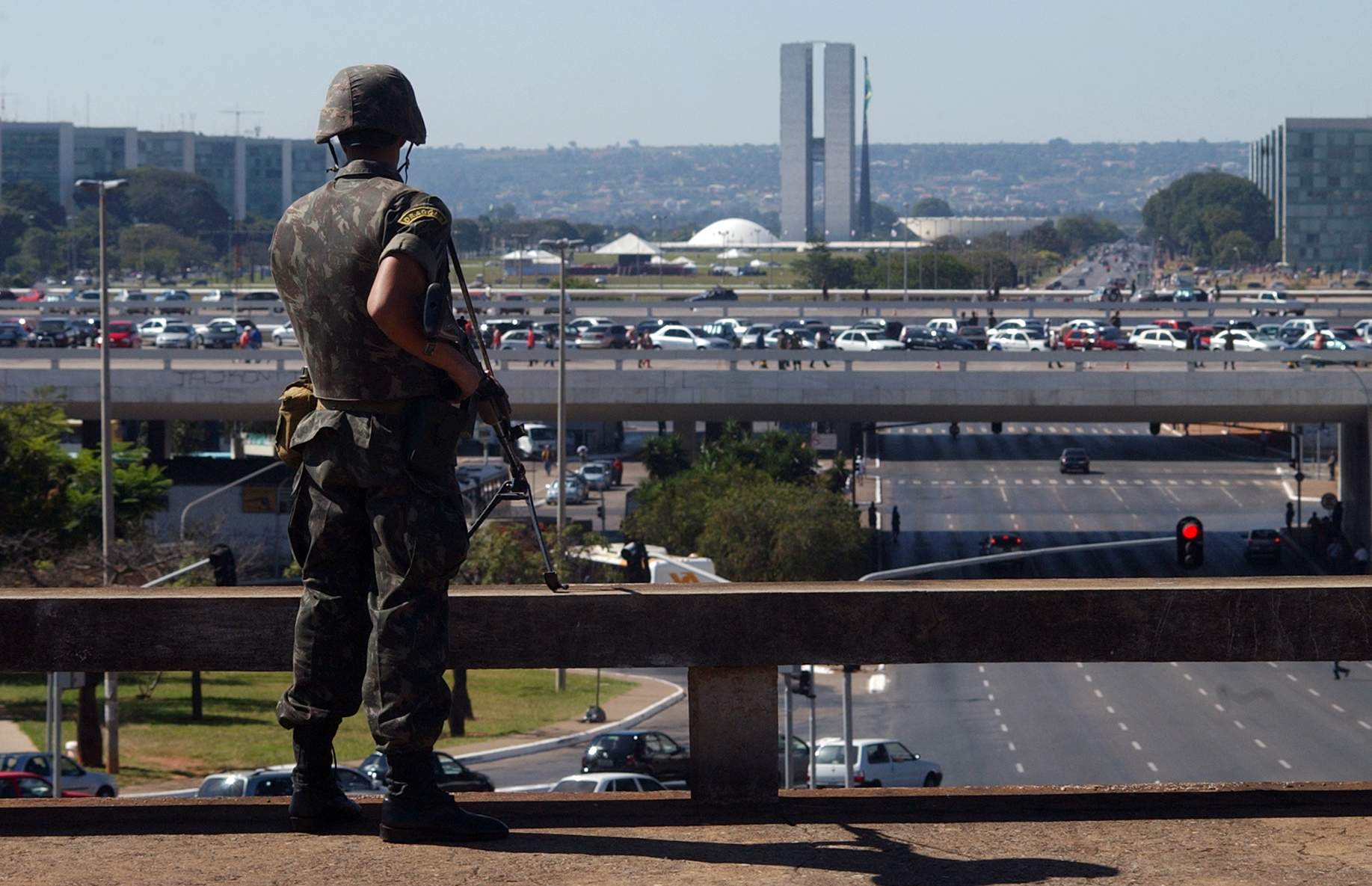
Soldier of the Brazilian Army patrols the surroundings of the Summit of Heads of State of Unasur in 2008, held in Brasília.

The South American Defense Council (CDS) was proposed by Venezuela and Brazil to serve as a mechanism for regional security, promoting military co-operation. From the beginning Brazil, Argentina and Chile, the countries that took the leadership of the project, made clear that they did not intend to form a NATO-like alliance, but a cooperative security arrangement, enhancing multilateral military cooperation, promoting confidence and security building measures and fostering defense industry exchange. Colombia initially refused to join the defense council due to the strong military ties it has with the United States through the Plan Colombia. However, after reviewing the proposal they decided to join on 20 July 2008.

Shortly following the signing by Colombia's president, President of Chile Michelle Bachelet appointed a working group to investigate and draft a plan for the new council. Finally, on 10 March 2009, the 12 nation members held, in Chile, the first meeting of the newly formed council.

In mid-2010, UNASUR played a key role in mediating the 2010 Colombia–Venezuela diplomatic crisis. On 1 September 2010, the agency "UnasurHaití" was created to provide US$100 million in help to Haiti.

== Democracy ==
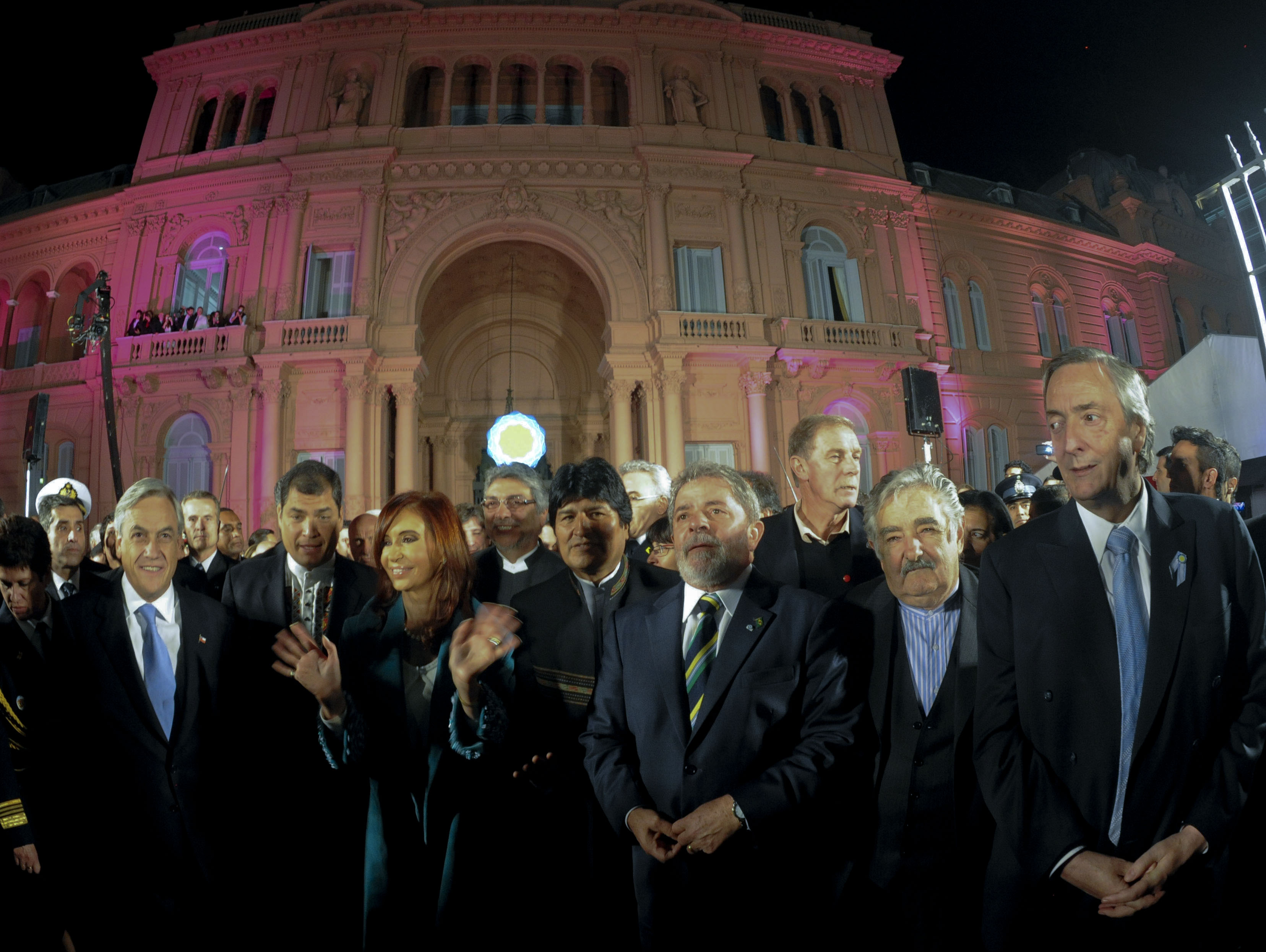
South American presidents in front of the Casa Rosada, Buenos Aires, during the bicentenary of the May Revolution.

On 26 November 2010, the Additional Protocol on Commitment to Democracy was signed in the city of Georgetown, Cooperative Republic of Guyana. The protocol derives from the mandate established in the Buenos Aires Declaration of 1 October 2010, which affirms that member states will not tolerate a challenge to institutional authority, nor attempt to strike a legitimately constituted civilian power, adopting concrete and immediate measures in case of breach of constitutional order. It is applicable "in the event of a breach or threat of a breach of the democratic order, of a violation of the constitutional order or in any situation that endangers the legitimate exercise of power and the observance of democratic values and principles."

In the event of such a situation, the Council of Heads of State and Government or the Council of Ministers of Foreign Affairs may be convened extraordinarily by the Pro-Tempore Presidency of the Union, ex officio or at the request of the affected State or another member of UNASUR, to deliberate on the application of sanctions to the affected state. Among the political and diplomatic sanctions envisaged by the Protocol, the following stand out:

- Suspension of the right to participate in the different organs and instances of Unasur
- Partial or total closure of land borders with the affected State, including suspension or limitation of trade, air and sea transportation, communications, energy supply, services and supply.

== Free movement of people ==
Visits by citizens of UNASUR to any other UNASUR member state of up to 90 days only require an identification document issued by the traveler's country. In November 2006, Argentina, Bolivia, Brazil, Chile, Colombia, Ecuador, Guyana, Paraguay, Peru, Suriname, and Uruguay agreed to abolish visa requirements for tourists between any of those nations.

Mercosur, along with its Associate members of Bolivia, Chile, Colombia and Ecuador established that their territories together form an "area of free residence with the right to work" to all its citizens, with no additional requirements other than nationality. The Free Movement and Residence Agreement was established in the Brasília summit based in a previous document signed on 6 December 2002.

Citizens of any Mercosur countries will have a simplified process in temporary residence visa of up to two years in any other member countries, with the requirements of a valid passport, birth certificate, and no criminal record. Temporary residence can become permanent if a licit means of living can be verified.

== Electoral monitors ==
UNASUR intended to create electoral monitor teams that would replace the monitors from the Organization of American States.

== Participating nation states ==
Signed
In force
Document
1969
1969
Cartagena Agreement
1991
1991
Treaty of Asunción
2004
2004
Cusco Declaration
2008
2011
Constitutive Treaty

Union of South American Nations (UNASUR)

Andean Pact (Andean Community of Nations)

Mercosur

UNASUR member states. (Territories in white not part of UNASUR.)

- Participating members of the Andean Community of Nations (CAN): ^{1 L}
  - Bolivia ^{M}
- Participating members of Mercosur: ^{2 L}
  - Venezuela ^{S}
- Other members:
  - Guyana ^{C}
  - Suriname ^{C}

^{1} These countries are also considered to be associate members of Mercosur.
^{2} These countries are also considered to be associate members of the Andean Community.
^{C} Caribbean Community (CARICOM) member state
^{L} Latin American Integration Association (ALADI) member state
^{M} Accessing member to Mercosur
^{S} Suspended

- Observers:
Member states of the Andean Community trade bloc.

Member states of the Mercosur trade bloc.

Member states of neither Andean Community nor Mercosur.

Exclusive Economic Zones of the member states of the USAN. Considering them, the total area reaches the 29,884,548 km^{2} (11,538,488 sq mi)

=== Participating non-South American territories ===
The following territories situated outside South America are part of member states and therefore participate:

- Isla Aves, a Venezuelan territory situated in the Antilles.

=== Non-participating South American states and territories ===
The following parts of South America are or were territories of non-South American states and therefore do not participate:

- Aruba, Bonaire and Curaçao are parts of the Kingdom of the Netherlands near the Venezuelan coastline.
- French Guiana, which is an overseas department of France and is therefore part of the European Union.
- The Falkland Islands and South Georgia and the South Sandwich Islands, which are overseas territories of the United Kingdom; they are also claimed by Argentina.
- Trinidad and Tobago, although not a member, this sovereign state had been a dependency of the United Kingdom and was invited to join the Union of South American Nations by President of Venezuela, Nicolas Maduro in July 2013.

A clickable Euler diagram showing the relationships between various multinational organizations in the Americas

== See also ==
- Pacific Alliance
- Mercosur
- Andean Community of Nations
- Community of Latin American and Caribbean States
- Continental union
- Economic integration
- South American Institute of Government in Health
- Free Trade Area of the Americas
- Latin American Integration Association
- Latin American Parliament
- Organization of Ibero-American States
- Central American Parliament
- Caribbean Community
- North American Union
- Organization of American States
- Rio Group
- European Union
- African Union
- PROSUL/PROSUR

== Bibliography ==
- José Antonio Sanahuja. "Post-liberal regionalism in South America: the case of Unasur", European University Institute, Robert Schuman Centre for Advanced Studies (EUI-RSCAS) 2012/05. Pdf version downloadable in "Working papers" (PDF). cadmus.eui.eu. Archived from the original (PDF) on 23 March 2014.
- José Briceño. "From the South American Free Trade Area to the Union of South American Nations: The Transformations of a Rising Regional Process". Latin American Policy, Volume 1, Issue 2, pages 208–229, December 2010
- Anne Marie Hoffmann: "South America's Neoliberal Turnaround: The End for Regional Social Policy", GIGA Focus Afrika No. 06/2016
