= South American Parliament =

Proposed body of the South American Union

South American Parliament Parlamento Suramericano

Type
- Type: Unicameral
- Seats: 99

Meeting place
- Villa sudamericana, Cochabamba, Bolivia

Website
- UNASURSG.org

The South American Parliament is a proposed body of the Union of South American Nations (USAN).

== History ==
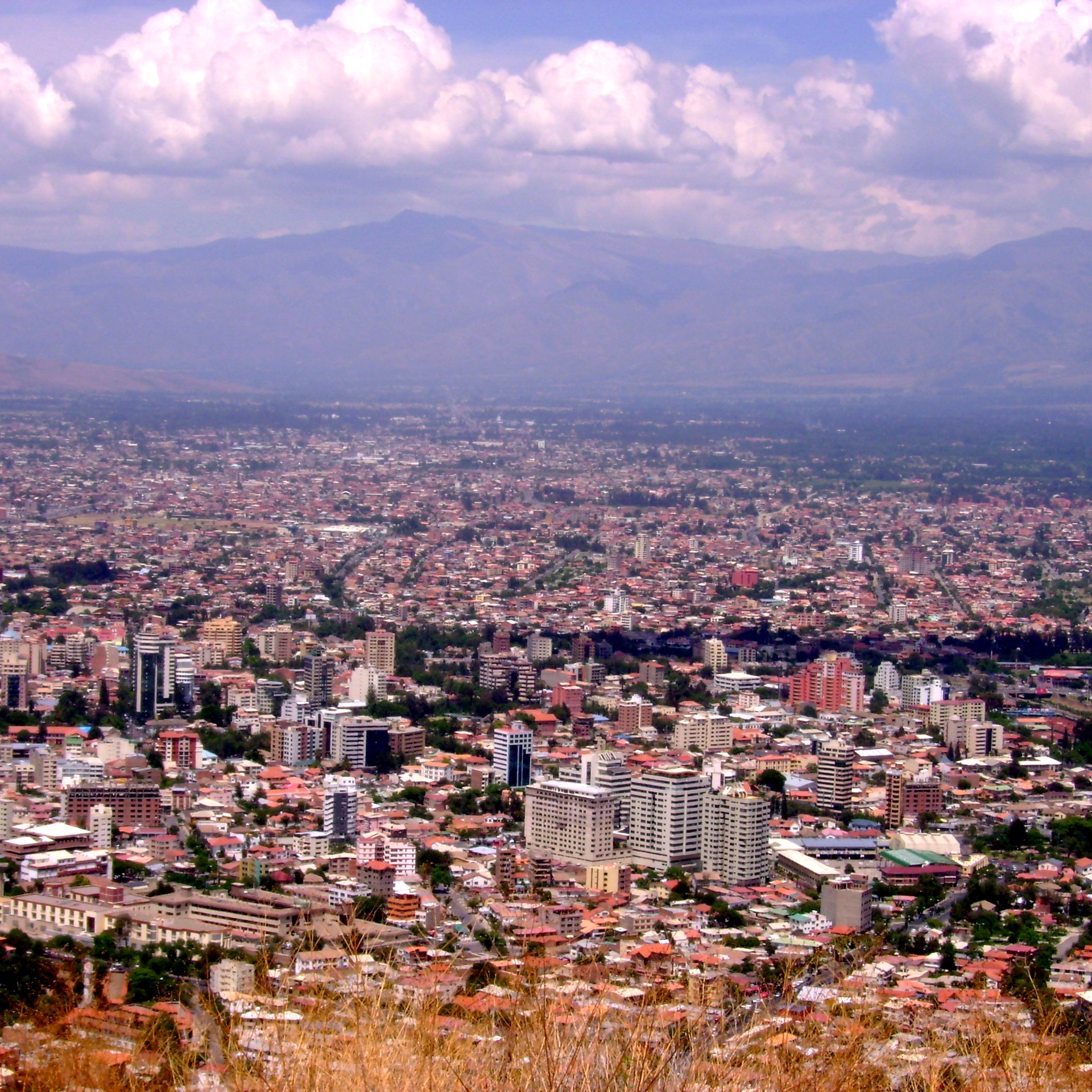
Cochabamba is to serve as the South American Parliament's seat.

The 2004 Cusco Declaration, announcing the USAN's formation, called for the establishment of a USAN parliament. The 2008 UNASUR Constitutive Treaty (effective since 2011) confirmed its intended establishment, but does not list it with the other bodies, and does not give any details on its composition. Article 17 states that the Parliament would be located in Cochabamba, Bolivia, and its creation would be subjected to an additional protocol. A transitory article of the Treaty states how this protocol would be created: members will appoint a "Special Commission" composed of national and regional Members of Parliament who would meet in Cochabamba to draft the protocol, pending to be considered at the Fourth Summit of Unasur leaders. The protocol would lay out composition of the Parliament and how it functions.

During these summits the presidents would hold meetings on energy, infrastructure, education and social policies, in addition to defining a transitional formula until the full force of the treaty, which must still be approved by legislatures, comes into effect. Foreign ministers are to meet every six months.

== Functioning ==
The Parliament will have ninety-nine parliamentarians. Each country will delegate up to five parliamentarians, more than the Andean Parliament's members, of the Mercosur Parliament and of the parliaments of Guyana and Suriname. The presidents of the legislative bodies of each member country of the Unasur will also integrate it.

It will have a routine of consistent operation in two annual meetings: the first in June and the second in November, although extraordinary meetings could also be convened.

The Parliament of the Unasur will have commissions and sub-committees, presidencies and vice-presidencies, secretaries and sub-secretaries.

All the pronouncements of the Parliament of the Unasur will be published in an official newspaper that will be created specifically for such purpose.

Powers are to be delegated to the Parliament, in order for it to consolidate the democracy in the region, to establish cooperative relationships among the member countries, to issue declarations and make recommendations, to foster the development of the representative democracy and to be in charge of the sub-organisations and institutions of Unasur.

The South American Parliament also has the task of leading the development and implementation, in coordination with the Bank of the South, of a new single South American currency that is to be in circulation throughout the region. Thus the Bank of the South, based in Venezuela and sub-offices in Buenos Aires and La Paz, in conjunction with the General Secretariat, based in Quito, and now with the South American Parliament, based in Cochabamba, is to seek economic and social well being throughout the continent and to advance the goal of establishing a future "Ciudadano Americano" (American Citizen). Other agreements would also enable the citizens of the twelve countries to move freely within the UNASUR area with only the National Identity Document of each country.

== Construction ==
The Bolivian government has launched the start of construction of the Parliament building with an area of 200 hectares in the Valle Alto area. A specialized military academy located in the same area is to preserve the security of Parliament.

== See also ==
- Latin American and Caribbean Congress in Solidarity with Puerto Rico's Independence
- Latin American Parliament
- Mercosur Parliament
