= 2004 South American Summit =

International meeting in Peru

- Host country: Peru
- Dates: 7–9 December 2004

The 2004 South American Summit – the third of its kind, after earlier events in Brasília (September 2000) and Guayaquil (July 2002) – was held in Cuzco and Ayacucho, Peru, on 7 –9 December 2004. Officially it constituted the Extraordinary Meeting of the Andean Presidential Council (Reunión Extraordinaria del Consejo Presidencial Andino ) and was also billed as the Third Meeting of Presidents of South America (III Reunión de Presidentes de América del Sur).

The main item on the agenda was the signature, by heads of state and plenipotentiary representatives of 12 South American nations, of the Cuzco Declaration, a two-page document containing a preamble to the deed of foundation of the South American Community of Nations (or "South American Union"), uniting the region's two existing free-trade organisations – Mercosur and the Andean Community.

Ayacucho was chosen for symbolic reasons: it was there that Antonio José de Sucre, fighting under the banner of Simón Bolívar "the Liberator", defeated the last Imperial Spanish troops in South America on 9 December 1824.

While the organisation's exact nature and functions – and even its name – remain unclear, it aspires to evolve along the lines followed by the continental integration efforts of the European Union, rather than becoming a mere free-trade area. The initiative emerged – largely at the instigation of Brazil – in response to the failed negotiations of the Free Trade Area of the Americas. The FTAA process has been stalemated for more than 12 months in the wake of irreconcilable differences, largely along the geopolitical faultlines between Latin America and the Caribbean on the one hand and the United States and Canada on the other.

== Participating nations ==
- Argentina – Néstor Kirchner not attending
- Bolivia – represented by Carlos Mesa
- Brazil – represented by Luiz Inácio Lula da Silva
- Colombia – represented by Álvaro Uribe
- Chile – represented by Ricardo Lagos
- Ecuador – Lucio Gutiérrez not attending
- Guyana – represented by Bharrat Jagdeo
- Paraguay – Nicanor Duarte not attending
- Peru – represented by Alejandro Toledo
- Suriname – represented by Ronald Venetiaan
- Uruguay – Jorge Batlle not attending
- Venezuela – represented by Hugo Chávez

Mexico (Foreign Minister Luis Ernesto Derbez) and Panama (President Martín Torrijos) are also attending the event, with nonparticipating observer status.

== See also ==
- Summit of the Americas
- Pan-American Conference
