= Council of South American Defense =

The Council of South American Defense (Spanish: Consejo de Defensa Suramericano, Portuguese: Conselho de Defesa Sul-Americano, Dutch: Zuid-Amerikaanse Defensie Raad) is a mechanism that aims to promote the exchange of safety among the countries that make up the Union of South American Nations, such as military exchanges, experiences in peacekeeping missions, military exercises, confidence-building measures, and mutual and co-ordinated assistance in areas of natural disasters.

Its statutes provide for a session once a year, and its resolutions are adopted by consensus.

The Presidency has the responsibility to co-ordinate all activities under the umbrella of the Council. The Presidency is exercised by the Pro Tempore President of UNASUR. Also, the Council has an advising body called the Center of Strategic Defence Studies.

The Defence Council is not a conventional military alliance like NATO, but it involves some regional military coordination.

== See also ==
- Bank of the South
- South American Parliament
- Union of South American Nations
