= Cusco Declaration =

2004 declaration of intent to form a South American Union

- Created: 8 December 2004
- Location: Cusco, Peru
- Signatories: 12 South American countries
- Purpose: Declaration of intent to establish the Union of South American Nations

The Cusco Declaration, formally titled Preamble to the Foundation Act of the South American Union, is a two-page declaration of intent signed by 12 South American countries during the Third South American Summit on 8 December 2004 in Cusco, Peru. It announces the foundation of the Union of South American Nations. It called for a regional parliament, a common market and a common currency.

== See also ==
- Constitutive Treaty
