= UNASUR Constitutive Treaty =

South American intergovernmental treaty

Constitutive Treaty
Treaty establishing the Union of South American Nations
- Signed: May 23, 2008
- Location: Brasília, Brazil
- Effective: March 11, 2011
- Condition: Ratified by 12 Member States
- Signatories: 12
- Parties: 12: Argentina; Bolivia; Brazil; Chile; Colombia; Ecuador; Guyana; Paraguay; Peru; Suriname; Uruguay; Venezuela
- Depositary: Government of Ecuador
- Languages: Dutch, English, Portuguese and Spanish

Full text
- Constitutive Treaty of the Union of South American Nations at Wikisource

The UNASUR Constitutive Treaty, officially the Constitutive Treaty of the Union of South American Nations, was signed on May 23, 2008 during the extraordinary summit of heads of state and government of the Union of South American Nations (UNASUR) held in Brasília, Brazil. It officially established the Union of South American Nations, an intergovernmental continental union of all twelve South American nations.

== Signatories ==
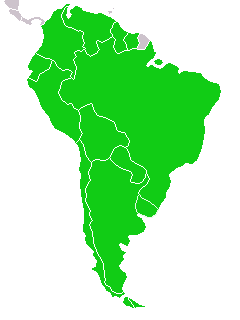
The twelve signatory states of the UNASUR Constitutive Treaty.

On behalf of	Signed by	Ratified	Date of ratification
Argentina	Cristina Kirchner	Yes Yes	2 August 2010
Bolivia	Evo Morales	Yes Yes	11 March 2009
Brazil	Luiz Inácio Lula da Silva	Yes Yes	14 July 2011
Chile	Michelle Bachelet	Yes Yes	22 November 2010
Colombia	Álvaro Uribe	Yes Yes	28 January 2011
Ecuador	Rafael Correa	Yes Yes	15 July 2009
Guyana	Bharrat Jagdeo	Yes Yes	12 February 2010
Paraguay	Nicanor Duarte	Yes Yes	9 June 2011
Peru	Alan García	Yes Yes	11 May 2010
Suriname	Ronald Venetiaan	Yes Yes	5 November 2010
Uruguay	Rodolfo Nin Novoa	Yes Yes	9 February 2011
Venezuela	Hugo Chávez	Yes Yes	13 March 2010

== Ratification ==
The Constitutive Treaty of the Union of South American Nations came into force on March 11, 2011, thirty days after the date of receipt of the ninth instrument of ratification.

== Treaty content ==
The treaty consists of 27 relatively short sections, and is the constitution of the new union. It outlines its structure and organs, and assumes that additional documents fill in the details.

=== Summary ===
The treaty declares the establishment and objects of the Union (in §§ 1-3), its organs (§§ 4-10 and 17), juridical foundation (§§ 11-13 and 22-27), and financial foundation (§ 16). It regulates the acceptance of new associate or full members and the right of cessation from the union in §§ 19, 20, 24, and 26, and the rules for adopting amendments to the treaty in § 25. Finally, §§ 14, 15, 18, and 21 declare the intent to employ dialogue among the member states, with its citizens, with third parties, and as the means for conflict resolution.

=== Membership ===
The 12 original signatories of the document have presented documentation of ratification to the Ecuadorian government. Other Latin American and Caribbean states may be admitted as associated members. An associated member may apply for and be granted full membership, but only after having been associated for at least four years, and only after five years have elapsed since the treaty came into force. This implies that no new full members outside the original twelve can be admitted before March 11, 2016.

A full or associated member state may unilaterally withdraw from the union. To do so, the state must deposit their cessation documentation in a similar manner as the ratification, and the cessation will take effect six months after the deposition. However, cessation of membership will not free states from any financial debts to the Union for unpaid membership fees or otherwise.

At the time the treaty came into force on March 11, 2011, it had been ratified by Argentina, Bolivia, Chile, Colombia, Ecuador, Guyana, Peru, Suriname, Uruguay, and Venezuela. The two other original signatories, Brazil and Paraguay, had not yet completed the ratification process by that date. By December 14, 2011, when Colombia deposited its instruments of ratification of the Constitutive Treaty with the Government of the Republic of Ecuador, the process was complete.

=== Amendments ===
Any member state may suggest amendments to the constitutional treaty. In order to be adopted, an amendment must be approved by the Council of Heads of State and Government, and then ratified by at least nine member states.

== Additional Protocol ==
On November 26, 2010, during the 2010 South American Summit, representatives introduced a democratic clause to the Constitutive Treaty of the Union of South American Nations. The amendment specifies measures to be taken against member-states whose political processes are not respected. The clause establishes sanctions, such as shutting down borders and the suspension of trade against the country that suffers an attempted coup.

The decision to include a democratic clause was made after the recent upheaval in Ecuador that briefly threatened the administration of President, Rafael Correa. The additional protocol was signed by all member-states of UNASUR.

== Entering into force ==
On March 11, 2011, when the Constitutive Treaty entered into legal force, establishing the Union of South American Nations as an international legal personality, the Foreign Ministers of the UNASUR member states met at Ciudad Mitad del Mundo, Ecuador, to celebrate the event and lay the foundation stone of the UNASUR Secretariat headquarters.

== See also ==
- Cusco Declaration
