= Member states of the Union of South American Nations =

Current members Suspended members Former members

There are four active member states of the Union of South American Nations after six member states suspended their participation in the organization in April 2018, while Ecuador and Uruguay announced their withdrawals in March 2019 and March 2020 respectively.

== Member States ==
Flag	Country	Capital	Area (km^{2})	Population	Density (/km^{2})	Currency	GDP per cap. (PPP)	Gini	HDI	Official, National, & Recognized languages
	Argentina República Argentina	Buenos Aires	2,780,403	43,417,000	14.49/km^{2}	Argentine peso	15,030	48.8	0.797	Spanish (de facto) also see Languages of Argentina for other Co-official languages
	Bolivia Estado Plurinacional de Bolivia; Bulivya Mamallaqta; Wuliwya Suyu	Sucre; La Paz	1,098,581	9,119,152	8.9/km^{2}	Bolivian boliviano	4,575	57.2	0.663	Spanish; Quechua; Aymara and 34 others also see Languages of Bolivia
	Brazil República Federativa do Brasil	Brasília	8,514,877	204,451,000	22/km^{2}	Brazilian real	11,065	55.0	0.718	Portuguese; Brazilian Sign Language also see Languages of Brazil for other Co-official languages
	Colombia República de Colombia	Bogotá	1,141,748	48,219,827	40/km^{2}	Colombian peso	9,091	58.5	0.710	Spanish; 68 other languages/dialects also see Languages of Colombia
	Guyana Co-operative Republic of Guyana	Georgetown	214,999	858,863	3.502/km^{2}	Guyanese dollar	7,004	43.2	0.633	English; Guyanese Creole; 11 other languages also see Languages of Guyana
	Suriname Republiek Suriname	Paramaribo	163,821	652,000	2.9/km^{2}	Surinamese dollar	8,947	41.5	0.680	Dutch also see Languages of Suriname
	Venezuela República Bolivariana de Venezuela	Caracas	916,445	28,199,822	30.2/km^{2}	Venezuelan bolívar	11,726	49.5	0.735	Spanish all other indigenous languages also see Languages of Venezuela

=== Suspended states ===
The following member states suspended their participation in the organization in April 2018.

Flag	Country	Capital	Area (km^{2})	Population	Density (/km^{2})	Currency	GDP per cap. (PPP)	Gini	HDI	Official, National, & Recognized languages
	Chile República de Chile	Santiago	756,950	16,763,470	22/km^{2}	Chilean peso	14,939	52.0	0.805	Spanish (de facto) also see Languages of Chile
	Ecuador República del Ecuador	Quito	256,370	13,922,000	53.8/km^{2}	Ecuadorian centavo United States dollar	8,021	54.4	0.720	Spanish also see Languages of Ecuador
	Paraguay República del Paraguay; Tetã Paraguái	Asunción	406,752	6,158,000	15.6/km^{2}	Paraguayan guaraní	4,710	53.2	0.665	Spanish; Guaraní also see Languages of Paraguay
	Peru República del Perú; Piruw Ripuwlika; Piruw Suyu	Lima	1,285,220	29,180,900	23/km^{2}	Peruvian sol	9,107	50.5	0.725	Spanish; Quechuan; Aymara all other indigenous languages also see Languages of Peru
	Uruguay República Oriental del Uruguay	Montevideo	176,215	3,477,779	19.8/km^{2}	Uruguayan peso	13,961	47.1	0.783	Spanish also see Languages of Uruguay

On 28 August 2018, Colombian president Iván Duque announced that foreign minister Carlos Holmes had officially notified Unasur of their intention to leave the bloc, effective in 6 months, denouncing it as an institution created by Hugo Chávez to sideline existing international treaties and referring to it as an accomplice to what they referred to as the dictatorship in Venezuela. Ecuador announced its withdrawal on 13 March 2019. Uruguay followed suit in March 2020. Following the 2022 Brazilian general election, newly elected president Luiz Inácio Lula da Silva signalled his intention to rejoin UNASUR. Argentina rejoined on 6 April 2023. Brazil rejoined on 5 May 2023. Colombia rejoined on 5 December 2023.

== Non-member States ==
=== Observer States ===
Flag	Country	Capital	Area (km^{2})	Population	Density (/km^{2})	Currency	GDP per cap. (PPP)	Gini	HDI	Official, National, & Recognized languages
Mexico	Mexico; Estados Unidos Mexicanos	Mexico City	1,972,550	112,322,757	56.9	Mexican peso	14,151	51.6	0.770	Spanish (de facto); 68 other indigenous languages also see Languages of Mexico
Panama	Panama; República de Panamá	Panama City	75,517	3,405,813	44.5	Panamanian balboa United States dollar	12,242	54.9	0.768	Spanish

=== Proposed Member States ===
Flag	Country	Capital	Area (km^{2})	Population	Density (/km^{2})	Currency	GDP per cap. (PPP)	Gini	HDI	Official, National, & Recognized languages
	Trinidad and Tobago; Republic of Trinidad and Tobago	Port of Spain	5,131	1,353,895	254.4	Trinidad and Tobago dollar	31,933	39.0	0.772	English
