= Jakob Maersk oil spill =

Coordinates: 41.1807645°N 8.6998633°W

- Date: January 29, 1975
- Location: Leixões, Portugal
- Type: Oil spill
- Deaths: 7

History
- Name: Jakob Maersk
- Port of registry: Copenhagen, (Denmark)
- Builder: Odense Steel Shipyard, Odense
- Yard number: 11
- Completed: 1966
- Identification: Call sign: OZYW; IMO number: 6605981
- Fate: Run around, caught fire and then exploded

General characteristics
- Type: Oil tanker
- Tonnage: 48,252 GRT; 89,412 DWT
- Length: 261.82 m (859.0 ft)
- Beam: 37.03 m (121.5 ft)
- Draught: 12.93 m (42.4 ft)
- Installed power: Stal-Laval steam turbine engine
- Speed: 17 knots (31 km/h; 20 mph)

Jakob Maersk was an oil tanker registered in Denmark that struck a sand bank on January 29, 1975, while entering the port of Leixões, Portugal, causing a major oil spill.

Built in 1966, the tanker was owned by Maerskline Navigation Company, a subsidiary of A.P. Moller, and contracted by Shell Oil Company, consisting of a crew of seventeen at the time of the accident. Seven of those seventeen crew members died during the explosion.

Jakob Maersk was carrying 88,000 tons of crude oil from Kharg Island in Iran while entering the Port of Leixões in the northern part of Portugal to discharge the oil to the Sacor Refinery. Receiving aid from tug boats, the ship grounded on a sand bank, causing a huge explosion and subsequent fire that burned for days. The explosion broke the ship apart, spilling crude oil into the water.

== Oil spill ==
At about 12:25 P.M. on January 29, 1975, the ship was entering the Port of Leixões in Portugal, while entering the Danish tanker hit a sandbar and this resulted in the spillage from the ship of massive amounts of oil into the ocean followed by a few explosions inside the engine room. The cause of this infamous disaster was because of human error. 7 of those 17 crew members died in that explosion, the majority of deaths were engineers.

During the time of the explosions, the ship began to sink, prompting survivors to jump into the water, the tugboat Monte de Luz assisted by rescuing survivors that were nearby.

The Jakob Maersk oil spill was the second largest spill at the time which occurred in the second largest city in Portugal. Out of the 40,000 to 50,000 tons of oil that were spilled consumed either by the fire or the ocean, 20,000 to 25,000 tons of that oil drifted into the sea and about 15,000 tons came to shore due to the wind direction during the first few days. The explosion caused thick black smoke to rise. The ship burned for 58 continuous hours.

There were reports of locals being affected by the fire that was caused but it did not escalate into serious effects or injuries.

== Containment and cleanup ==
Containment of the oil spill began with the placement of a floating boom at the harbor entrance. A straw barrier was placed around the wreck to briefly contain the spill while boats spread dispersants. The owners of the ship and the Shell company met together to decide how the oil spill was going to be cleaned or treated. The cleanup was the responsibility of the Portuguese Navy, Commandant Casquinno was appointed to clean up the oil spill and came up with a plan. The plan was separated into two actions, the first part of the plan was to clean up as much oil as possible that was in the water and the second part of the plan was to clean the oil that washed ashore.

A company called Fina Oil Company was nearby and contributed several drums of Finasol. This oil spill unlike others was very lucky due to the fact that there was an immediate response. There were boats readily available both large and small to use as transportation. Equipment was offered of all types especially heavy equipment that was necessary. Hoses and nozzles were provided by the local fire department. Labor was available from skilled to unskilled which was crucial for this operation.

The nearby Oporto airport made it easier to deliver specialized equipment within a near proximity. Communication was easily established in a nearby communications facility that was used as the Command Center. The type of shoreline made it an easy accessible area with fairly easy mobility of machinery and personnel. The fire that was caused was in some ways fortunate because it burned most of the fuel and if it had not been for it there would have been an even bigger mess on the shoreline.

BP made a huge contribution to the oil spill by contributing a chemical dispersant via airplane with 140 drums of BP 1100x on January 30, 1975, 150 of dispersant on January 31, 1975, provided a team of 5 to clean up the spill as much as possible. It was approximated that 2,000 barrels of dispersant was used to treat the oil spill. The purpose was to try and eliminate the oil on the coast using the waves as assistance to spread the dispersant. Even though it was a somewhat effective method is merely masked the oil in the sand. Later on machinery was brought in to dig up the contaminated sand and clean it using another method.

The most affected beach was the shore immediately adjacent to the wreck, where cleanup began with the removal of the upper layer of sand and the application of dispersants. It was bunker C oil a heavily residual oil which made it more difficult. This area was left until late in the cleanup and was extremely difficult to clean because the bunker C oil had been spread and untreated for some time. Dispersant was also added and affected very minimally due to the heavily seated bunker C. The ship's prow became stuck on a set of rocks near the Castelo do Queijo monument, remaining there for about 20 years, eventually becoming a landmark of the city until its removal.

== Ecological effects ==
Ecological damage appeared to be limited. Only half a dozen oiled birds were discovered during the first week on nearby shores. There was no apparent harmful effect on local fish populations, although a temporary difference in taste was observed. Dead seaweed and molluscs were found, but growth resumed shortly thereafter and populations returned to normal levels.

The cost of the catastrophe was estimated at 2.8 million dollars by the international Organisation for Economic Co-operation and Development.
