= St Vincent's Church, Braga =

Coordinates: 41.55603°N 8.421211°W

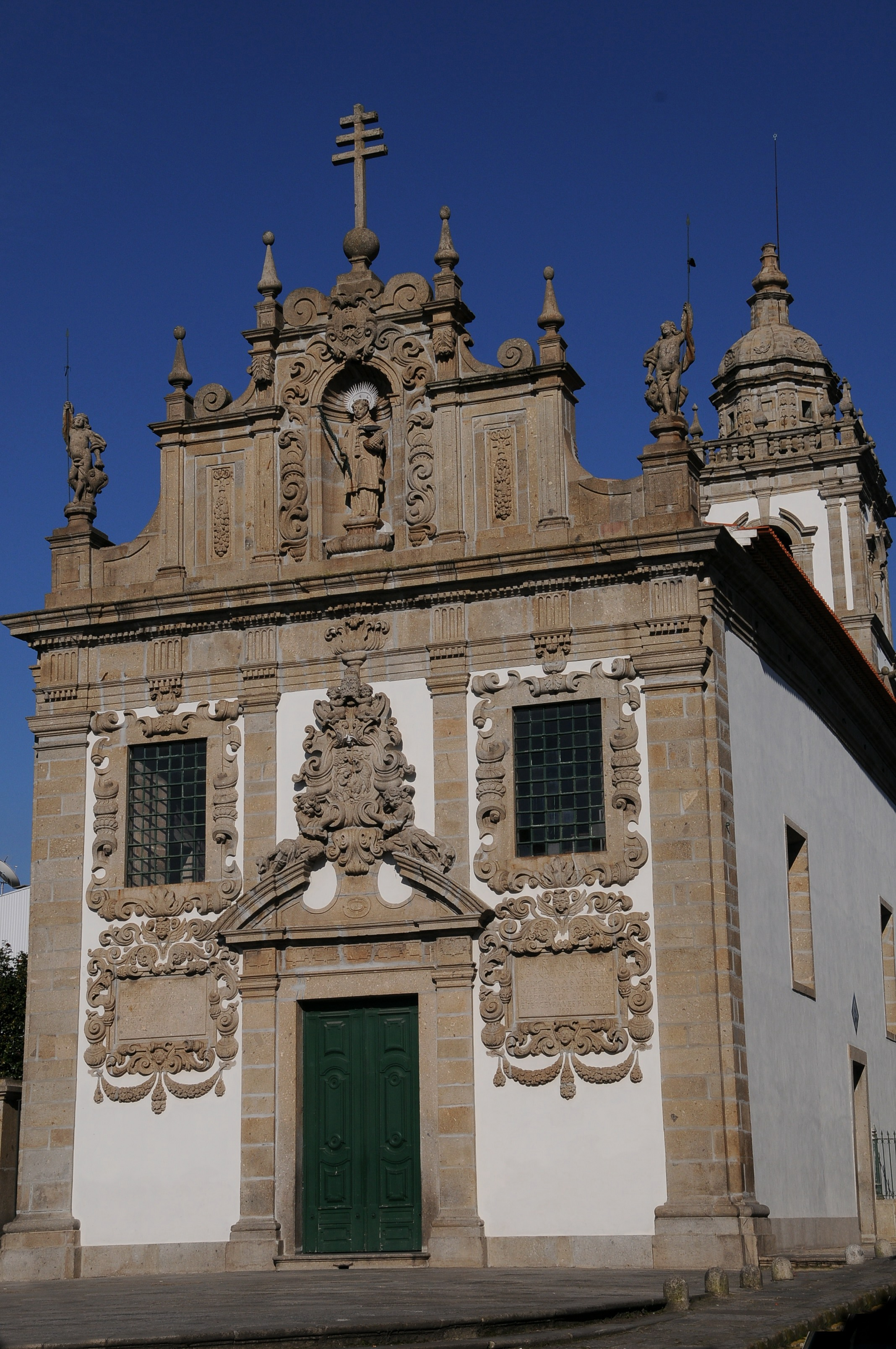
Saint Vincent Church-Braga

The Saint Vincent Church (Portuguese: Igreja de São Vicente) is a 16th-century baroque Catholic church in Braga, Portugal, dedicated to Saint Vincent of Saragossa. The Church has been classified as Property of Public Interest since 1986.

== Overview ==
It was built in 1565 and restored in 1691, on the same site where there was once a Visigoth church of the 7th century (656). In the sacristy there is a stone from that old building with the inscription: Here rests Remismuera since the first of May 618, Monday, in peace, Amen. This is the oldest authentic Christian monument in Braga, and the oldest reference of Segunda-feira, the Christian Portuguese name for Monday.

The façade is completed with the statue of St. Vincent in granite, set in a niche surmounted by the Papal Cross.

The church has a luxurious interior with wood carving work in the altars and azulejos on the walls.

== See also ==
- St Paul's Church
- Pópulo Church
- Saint Eulália Church
