= Carlos Amarante =

Portuguese engineer and architect

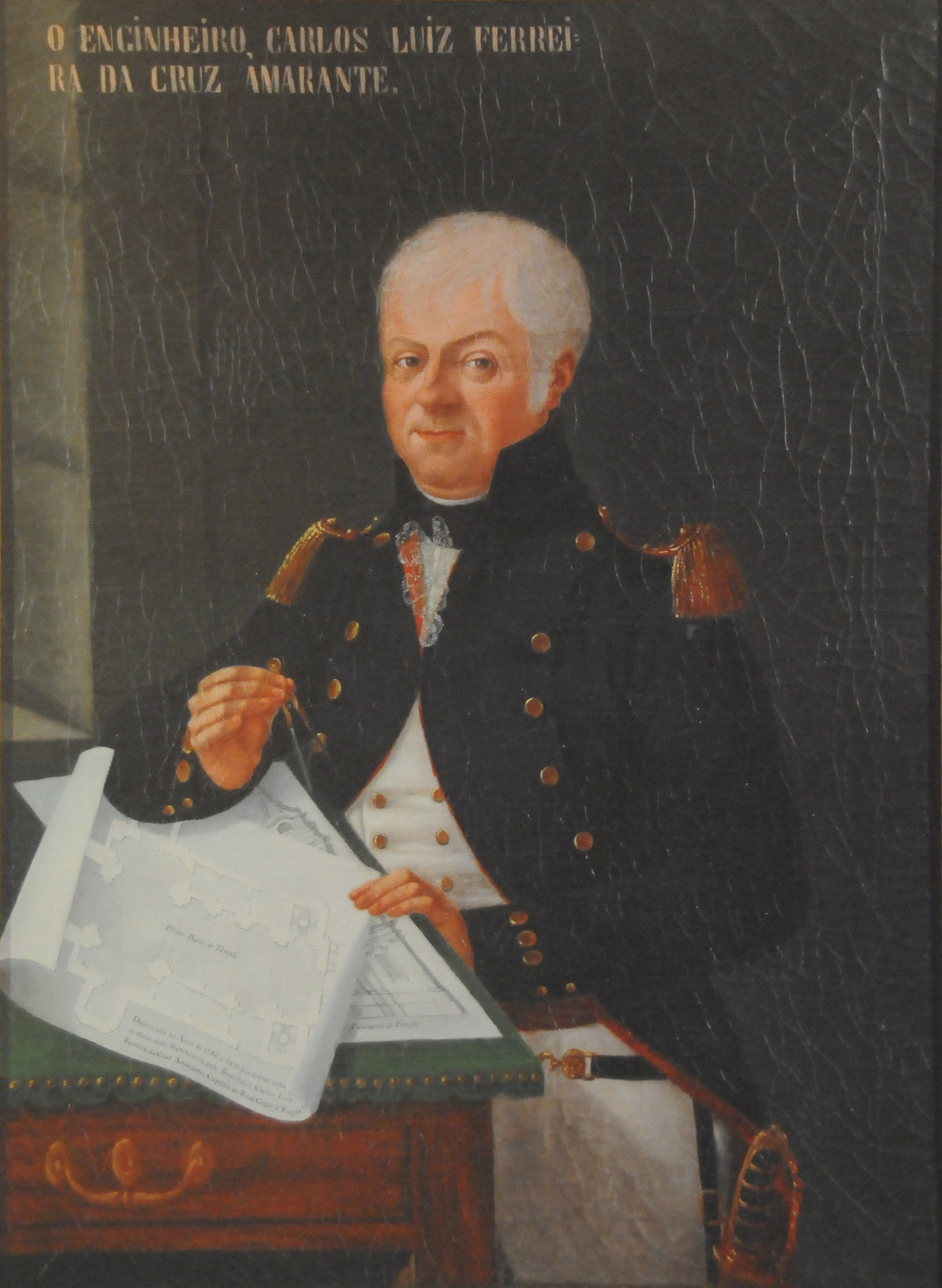
- Born: 30 October 1748; Braga
- Died: 22 January 1815 (aged 66); Porto
- Occupation: Architect
- Spouse: Luísa Clara Xavier
- Parent(s): Manuel Ferreira da Cruz Amarante, Maria Josefa Rosa de Almeida
- Buildings: Bom Jesus do Monte, Populo Church, Boat Bridge, Brejoeira Palace

Carlos Luís Ferreira da Cruz Amarante (30 October 1748 – 22 January 1815) was a Portuguese military engineer and architect. He played a key role in the transition from Baroque and Rococo styles to Neoclassicism in Portugal.

Largely self-taught, he began his career in Braga, where he designed religious and civic buildings that balanced traditional ornamentation with emerging neoclassical influences. His most notable work is the church at the Sanctuary of Bom Jesus do Monte, a landmark of late 18th-century Portuguese architecture. Later in his career, he fully embraced Neoclassicism in Porto, designing churches and infrastructure projects, including the city's first permanent bridge over the Douro River.

== Early life and education ==
Amarante was born in Braga, Portugal, to Manuel Ferreira da Cruz Amarante, a musician in the court of the Archbishops of Braga, and Maria Josefa Rosa de Almeida. At the age of 17, he entered the seminary but soon abandoned his religious studies due to a lack of vocation. He then turned to illustrating religious books and teaching music.

Some of his work from this era include the frontispiece of the book Estatutos de Nossa Senhora da Torre in 1765 and the organ design for the St Vincent's Church in 1769, both featuring asymmetrical Rococo motifs.

In 1771, he married Luísa Clara Xavier, with whom he had four children. Two years later, in 1773, he was appointed Inspector of Public Works in Braga. In 1783, he became the chamberlain to Archbishop Gaspar de Bragança, which allowed him access to the archbishop's library, where he acquired architectural knowledge as a self-taught student.

== Architectural Career ==
=== Early works in Braga ===
Amarante's first architectural projects were carried out in Braga. These included the residences of Dr. Francisco Maciel Aranha and the Vilhena Coutinho family, as well as the presbytery of the Church of Maximinos. Following these commissions, he gained recognition and became one of Braga's leading architects in the late 18th century.

Amarante's architectural work reflects the broader stylistic transition occurring in Braga during the late 18th century. While Neoclassicism was emerging as a dominant style, Braga's deep-rooted Baroque and Rococo traditions remained influential. The late Baroque and Rococo ornamental styles, derived from the works of André Soares and José de Santo António Vilaça, were prevalent in Braga during Amarante's career. By the late 1770s, Amarante's work began to reflect a clearer shift toward Neoclassicism, though his designs often balanced both Baroque and Neoclassical elements. The retable for the Irmandade de Barqueiros, proposed around 1774, exemplifies this transition: while Amarante favored a simpler, more refined structure, the brotherhood opted for additional ornamentation, reflecting the continued preference for grandeur in religious spaces.

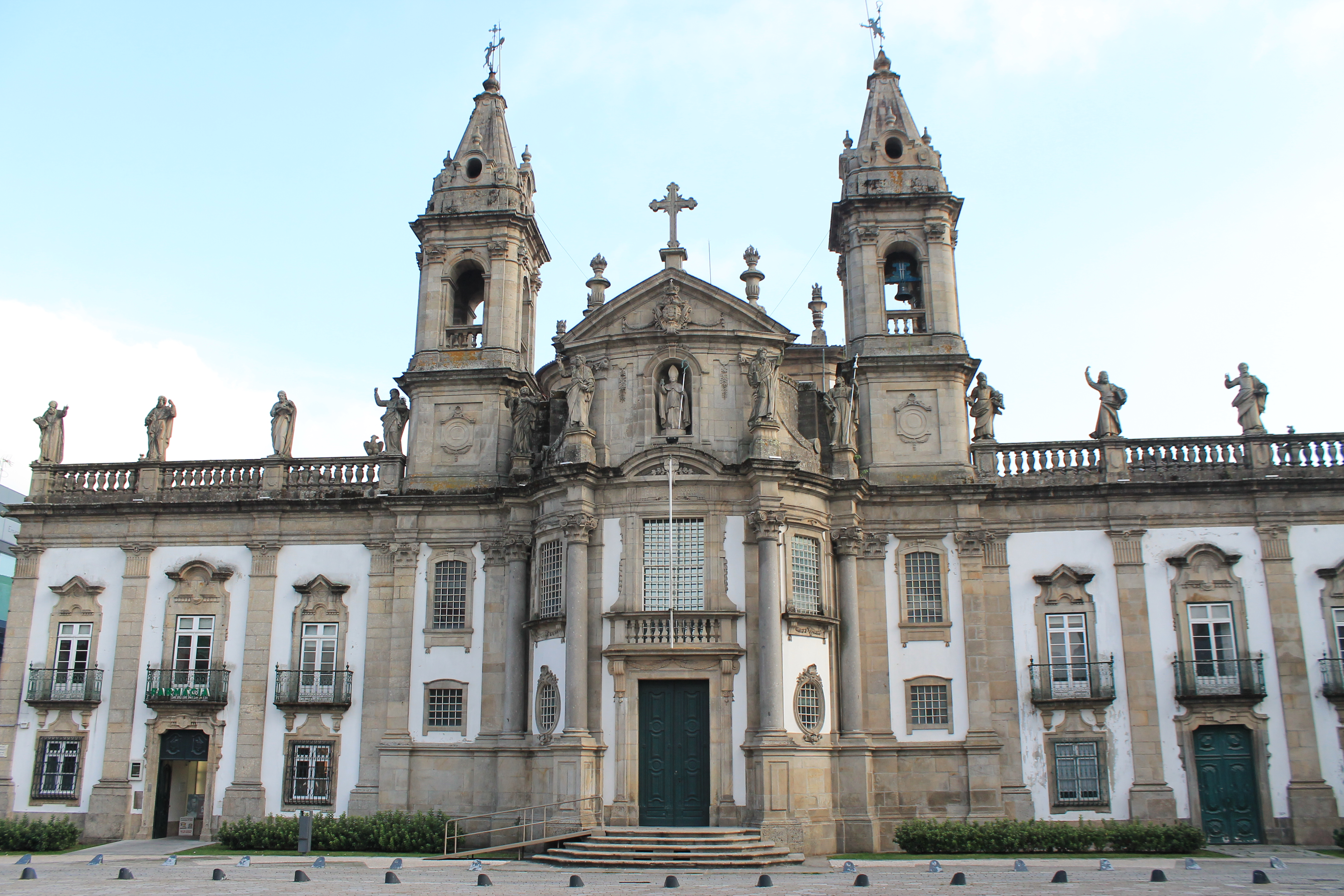
St Mark Hospital

This stylistic evolution became even more pronounced in the 1780s and 1790s, as Braga entered a period of artistic transformation. Many churches replaced their gilded interiors with marble-like altarpieces, indicative of changing tastes. Amarante's architectural contributions played a role in this transition, as seen in his designs for the retables at Church of Terceiros in 1781 and Senhora-a-Branca Church. However, in projects embracing the Neoclassical style such as the façade of the Pópulo Church and the Hospital of St Mark in Braga, Amarante continued to incorporate Baroque and Rococo elements.

=== Bom Jesus do Monte ===
Stairway of Virtues leading to the church of Bom Jesus do Monte

One of Amarante’s most significant works was the new church at the Sanctuary of Bom Jesus do Monte, designed in 1781 and built between 1784 and 1811. The archbishop of Braga wished for it to be of a monumental scale, comparable to the Estrela Basilica and the Palace of Mafra. He was responsible not only for the church but also for the surrounding gardens, the chapels, the Fountain of Moses, and the Stairway of Virtues.

For the high altar retable at Bom Jesus do Monte, completed in the late 1790s, Amarante blended Baroque grandeur with emerging Neoclassical trends, possibly influenced by Italian models from Lisbon or Porto, such as the work of Luís Chiari. His design featured a baldachin supported by straight, free-standing columns, a departure from heavily ornamented Baroque forms, replacing the typical crowning element with a dome. Nonetheless, its ornamental volutes echoed earlier Baroque influences, particularly the baldachin of Saint Peter’s Basilica in Vatican City. Amarante also proposed simplifying the Calvary iconography, reducing the number of figures in line with contemporary aesthetics favoring clarity. However, local confraternities resisted, preferring a more traditional Baroque arrangement. The final design was a compromise: the baldachin kept its Neoclassical framework, but the Calvary maintained its expanded sculptural group, preserving Baroque sensibilities. Additional elements, such as the Arma Christi and a pelican motif, further linked the work to the earlier styles.

=== Neoclassical works in Porto ===
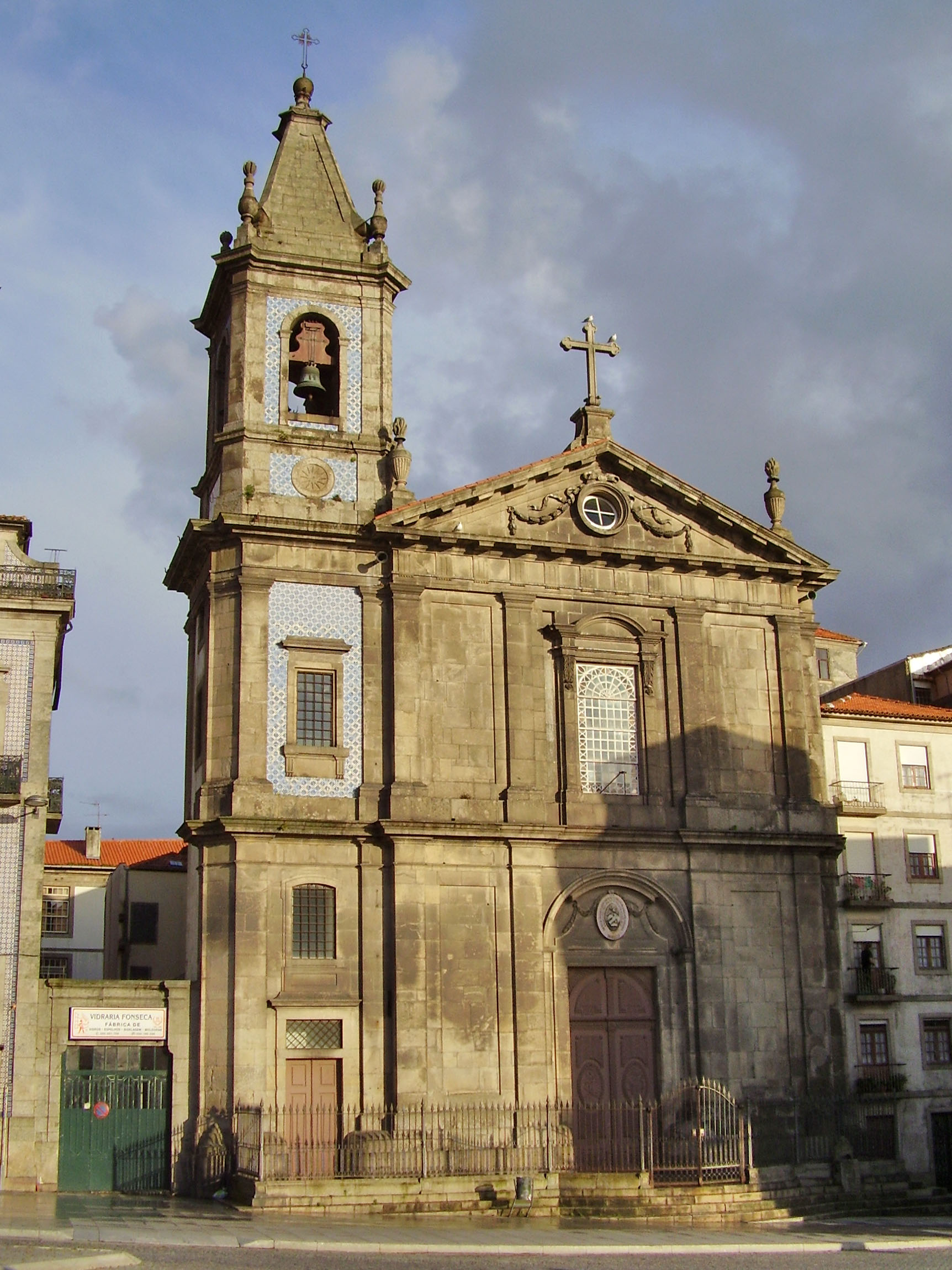
São José das Taipas Church

In Porto, Amarante fully embraced Neoclassicism, choosing this style for the churches of São José das Taipas and The Church of the Third Order of the Holy Trinity. Both of these designs would be altered, the first concerning the sacristy and main altarpiece, and the latter altered by architect João Francisco Guimarães. São José das Taipas Church would later house a painting depicting the Porto Boat Bridge disaster, which took place in a bridge designed by Amarante.

== Military Engineering Career ==
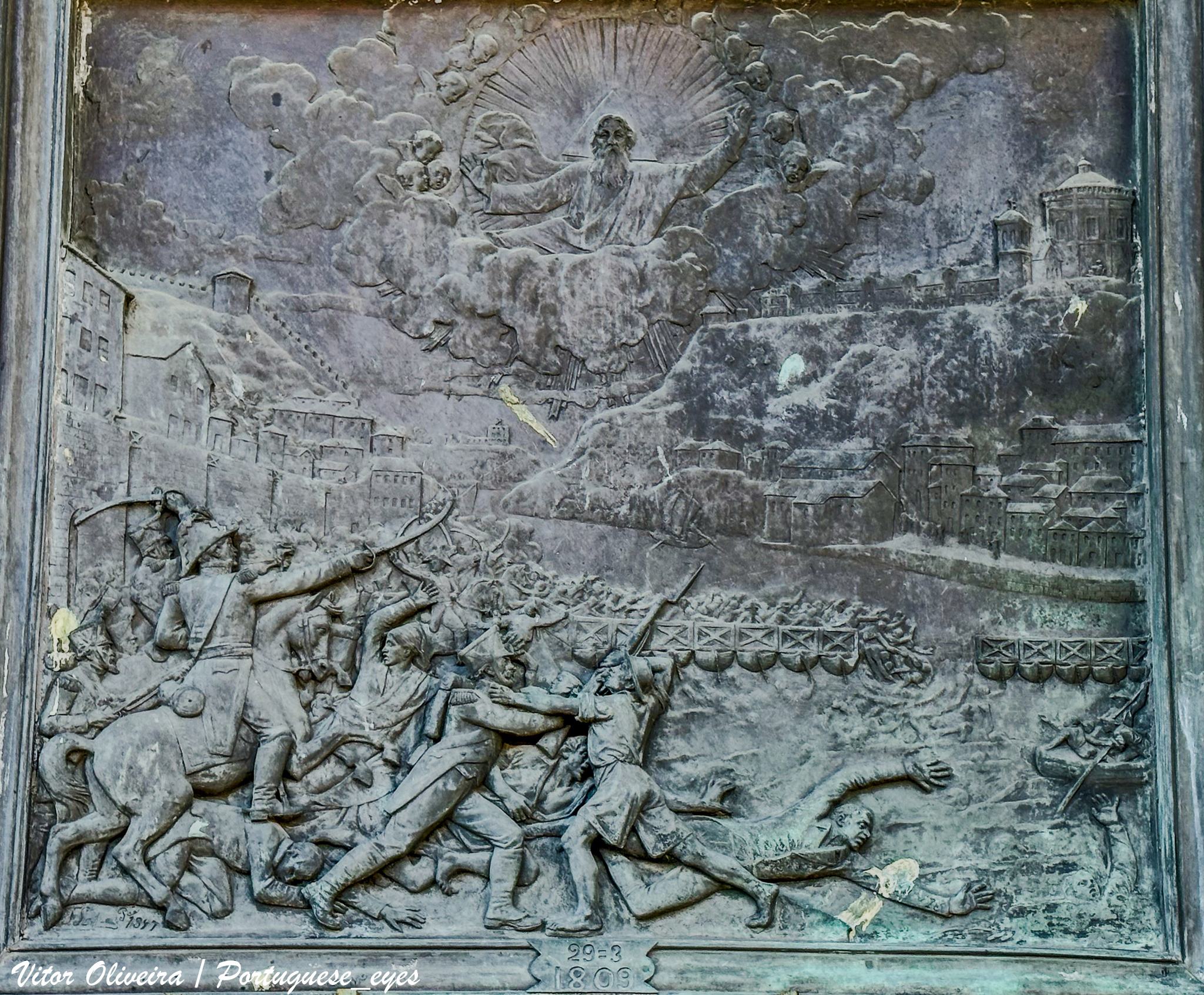
Bronze plate depicting the Porto Boat Bridge disaster

In 1789, after the death of his patron, Archbishop Gaspar de Bragança, Amarante began a military career. In 1792, he was appointed second lieutenant of the Royal Corps of Engineers and was tasked with drawing a topographical map from the Serra de Rio Maior to Leiria. He was promoted to first lieutenant in 1796 and, from 1799, was responsible for overseeing the construction of roads and bridges across Portugal.

In 1801, he was promoted to captain and was invited by Francisco de Almada e Mendonça to participate in the final phase of Porto’s urban transformation. There he designed the Boat Bridge (Ponte das Barcas) the first permanent crossing between Porto and Gaia in 1806. It was a pontoon bridge comprising 20 boats connected by iron ties, which could be opened to allow ships to pass through. This was the site of the Porto Boat Bridge disaster when the bridge partially collapsed as thousands of Porto residents fled invading French troops during the First Battle of Porto. In a prior plan from 1802, he had designed a single-arch stone bridge for the location, but the pontoon bridge design was chosen instead.

== Death and legacy ==
In 1812, Amarante was dismissed from the Royal Corps of Engineers due to a military engineering reform. He died in Porto on 22 January 1815 and was buried in the Church of the Third Order of the Most Holy Trinity. In 1837, as no one had claimed his remains, they were transferred to the general ossuary of the Order of the Trinity in Agramonte Cemetery.

== Works ==
- Bom Jesus do Monte - Braga
- Pópulo Church - Braga
- Hospital Church - Braga
- São Gonçalo Bridge over the Tâmega River in Amarante
- Boat Bridge - Porto
- Rectorate of University of Porto - Porto
- Trindade Church - Porto
- Brejoeira Palace - Monção
