= Porto Boat Bridge disaster =

1809 bridge collapse in Porto, Portugal

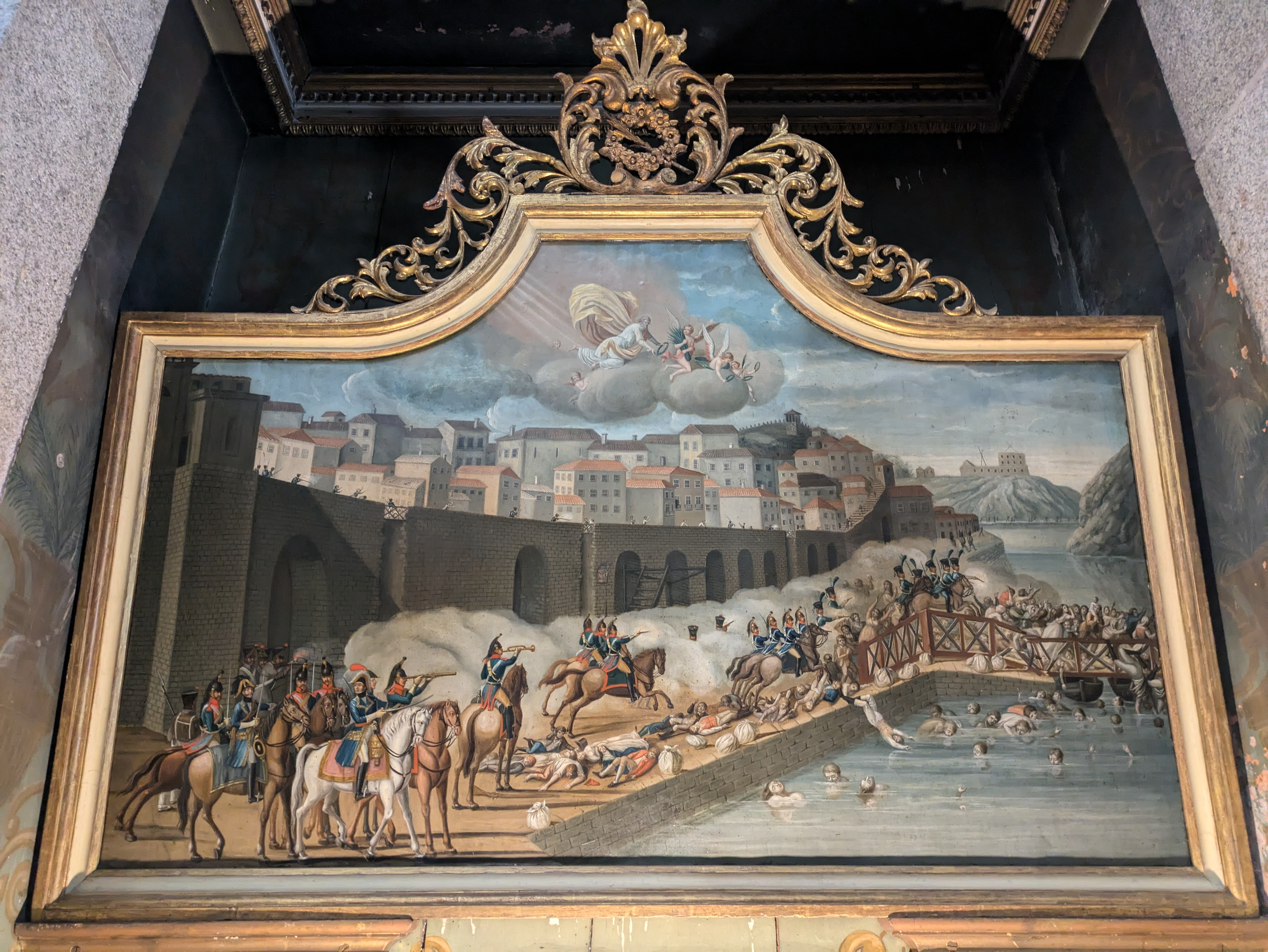
Suffrage of the Bridge of Boats (1845)

On 29 March 1809, the Ponte das Barcas (Portuguese for Bridge of Boats), a pontoon bridge on the River Douro in Porto, Portugal, was the site of one of the world's most deadly bridge disasters which occurred during the First Battle of Porto between Portuguese and French troops. While the exact number of deaths is unknown, estimates of around 4,000 deaths are usually given.

== The Bridge ==
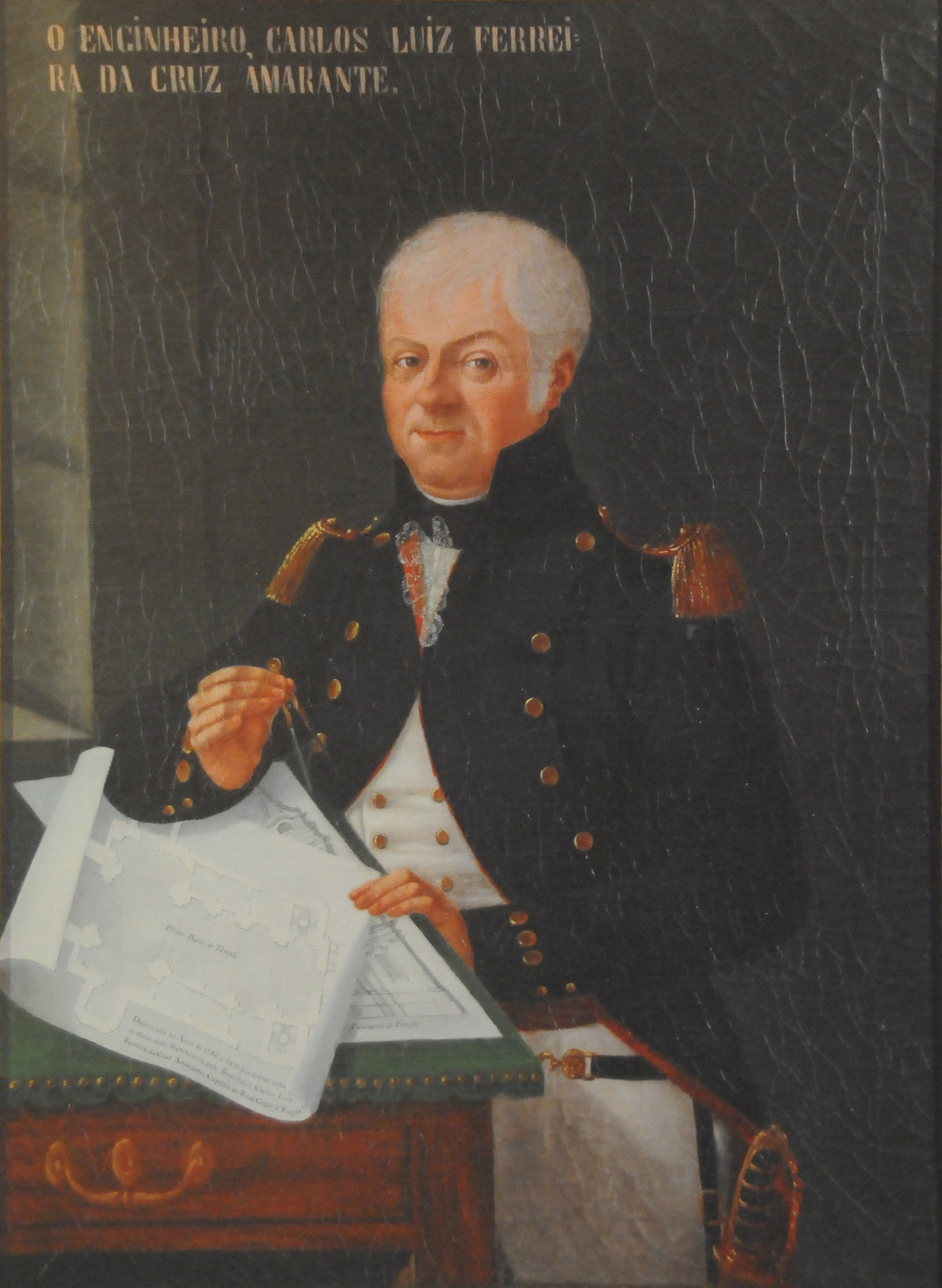
Carlos Amarante, designer of the bridge

Through the medieval period and earlier, passages over the River Douro between Porto and Gaia were principally undertaken in boats and rafts, with historic drawings showing intense traffic between the two shores; from 1744 a regular passenger boat service was established.

In special circumstances, such as periods of great festivity or the passage of armies, and depending on the flows and floods of the river, a temporary pontoon bridge (ponte de barcas) would have been constructed over the river. The first definite reference to such a pontoon bridge is in the chronicles of Fernão Lopes (1418–1459) who refers to an army of King Ferdinand I (1345-1383) which passed over a pontoon bridge between Porto and Gaia to relieve a siege of the city of Guimarães.

In 1806 a permanent pontoon bridge, designed by Carlos Amarante was constructed between Porto and Gaia. It was situated around a few metres west (downstream) of the site of the current Dom Luís I Bridge in the centre of Porto. Amarante was an architect and engineer responsible for designing many churches in Porto and Braga, including the Porto church of São José das Taipas, which was to become the central point of commemoration for the victims of the bridge dasaster.

In 1806, the first bridge [between Porto and Gaia] to be expressly designed as such as was inaugurated. It consisted of 20 boats laid side by side, anchored to the bottom of the river upstream and downsteam, over which ran a road to permit the passage of people, beasts and carts. This was a carefully constructed bridge: in his Descripção Topographica de Vila Nova de Gaya [1861] João António Monteiro de Azevedo commended the way the bridge "rose and fell with the tides, could be opened and closed to allow passage of large river traffic, and finally could be dismantled and re-established when the vicissitudes of the river demanded it."

— Manuel de Azeredo, Professor of Engineering, the University of Porto, 1998

== The First Battle of Porto ==
In the Napoleonic wars, French and Spanish troops briefly conquered Portugal in 1807, before being expelled by Portuguese and English forces in 1808. In January 1809, Napoleon ordered a second attempt. French troops commanded by Marshall Soult crossed Portugal's northern border with a view to taking Porto and then proceedings south to Lisbon. Soult's army captured the city of Chaves in central north Portugal on 12 March. They proceeded west towards Porto, capturing Braga on 20 March.

On 28 March, now outside of Porto, Soult wrote to the Bishop of Porto, in charge of the city, stating that the French only wished to free Portugal of the English, and asking for no resistance but threatening "rivers of blood" should it be offered.

That same day, French troops probed the city's defensive lines, which stretched around Porto from the coastal fortress of São Francisco Xavier in the west to the riverside district of Freixo, in the parish of Campanhã, at the eastern limits of the city, but their initial attacks met no success. The next morning, at 6 a.m. on 29 March, French forces launched a full-scale assault along the entire defensive line, gradually breaking through as fear and disorder spread among the defenders.

Though the Portuguese troops outnumbered the French, the defenders were poorly trained, organised and armed. Before the battle, the Bishop had already retreated to the Gaia side of the river. On 29 March, the French captured the city with minimal losses, and in the afternoon Soult permitted the city to be sacked (looted by his troops), the sacking to continue until 1 April.

== Disaster ==
The city of Porto occupies the north side of the river Douro, with the twin settlement of Vila Nova de Gaia on the south side. As French troops broke into Porto from the north and rapidly overcame the defending Portuguese soldiers, both defenders and city residents fled south over the Ponte das Barcas, towards Gaia, followed by the invaders.

The causes of the disaster are unclear and disputed. Deaths may have principally resulted from falls as weight of numbers led to the partial collapse of the bridge. Alternatively, or in addition, Portuguese soldiers may have opened the middle of the bridge - the bridge was designed to allow this for passage of river traffic - and citizens were pushed into the middle of the open river by the crowd fleeing behind them. The Portuguese cavalry, forced in retreat to the riverside, added to the disaster: people were killed by the cavalrymen's swords as they attempted to clear a path to the bridge; others were trampled under their horses. Still more people were killed by artillery fire from French troops on the Porto riverbank and from Portuguese soldiers. The latter took defensive positions at a battery positioned at Serra do Pilar, across the river, and started shooting towards Porto, killing more civilians than enemy soldiers. French troops later laid planks over the bridge to cross the river, driving back the Portuguese gunners. Following the disaster, French troops ultimately assisted some survivors who had fallen into the water.

Some reports state that by the end of disaster a few did succeed in crossing the river: they walked on the dead and drowning who filled the gaps in the damaged bridge.

== Memorials and commemoration ==
=== Church of São José das Taipas and shrine of the "Poor Souls of the Bridge" ===
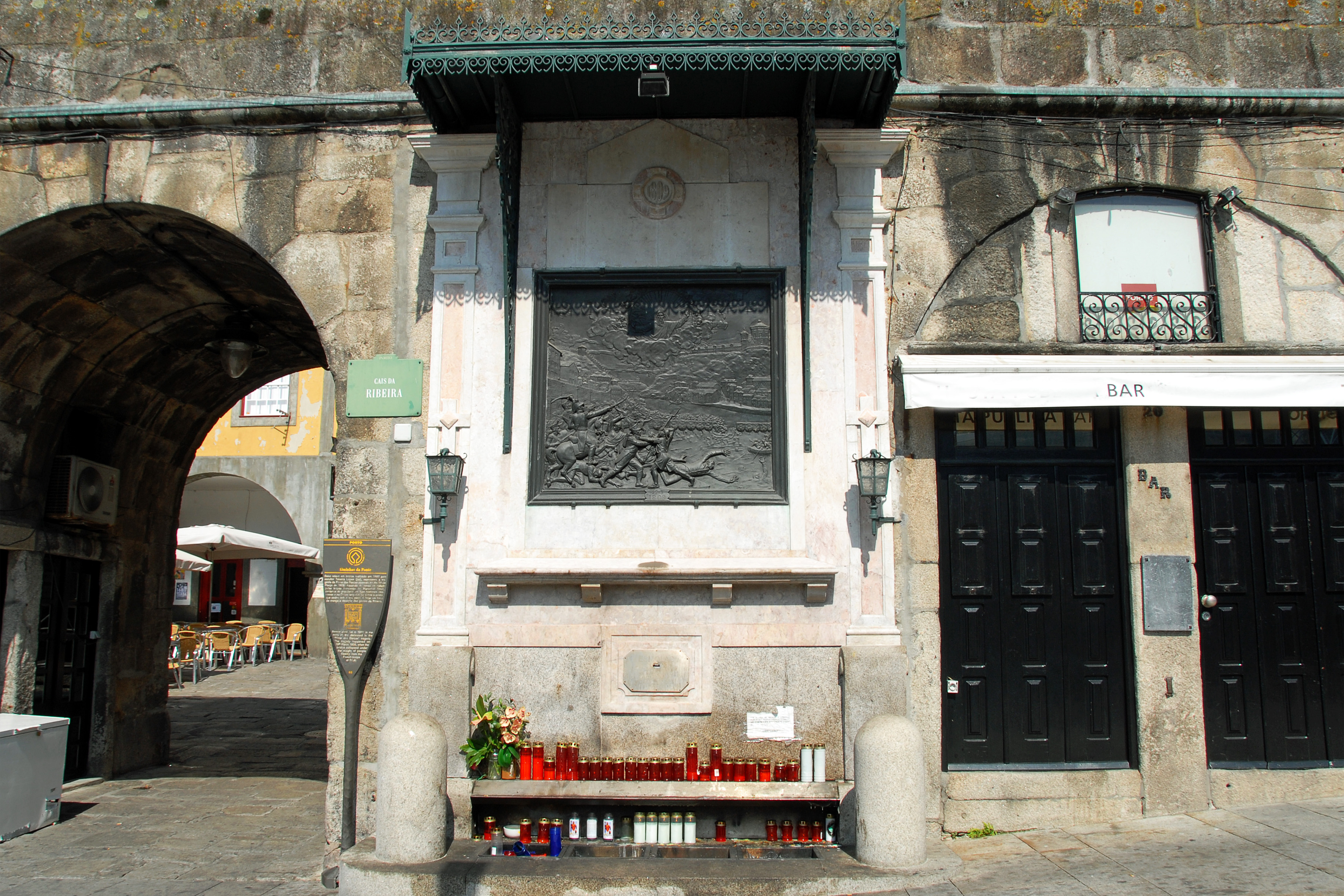
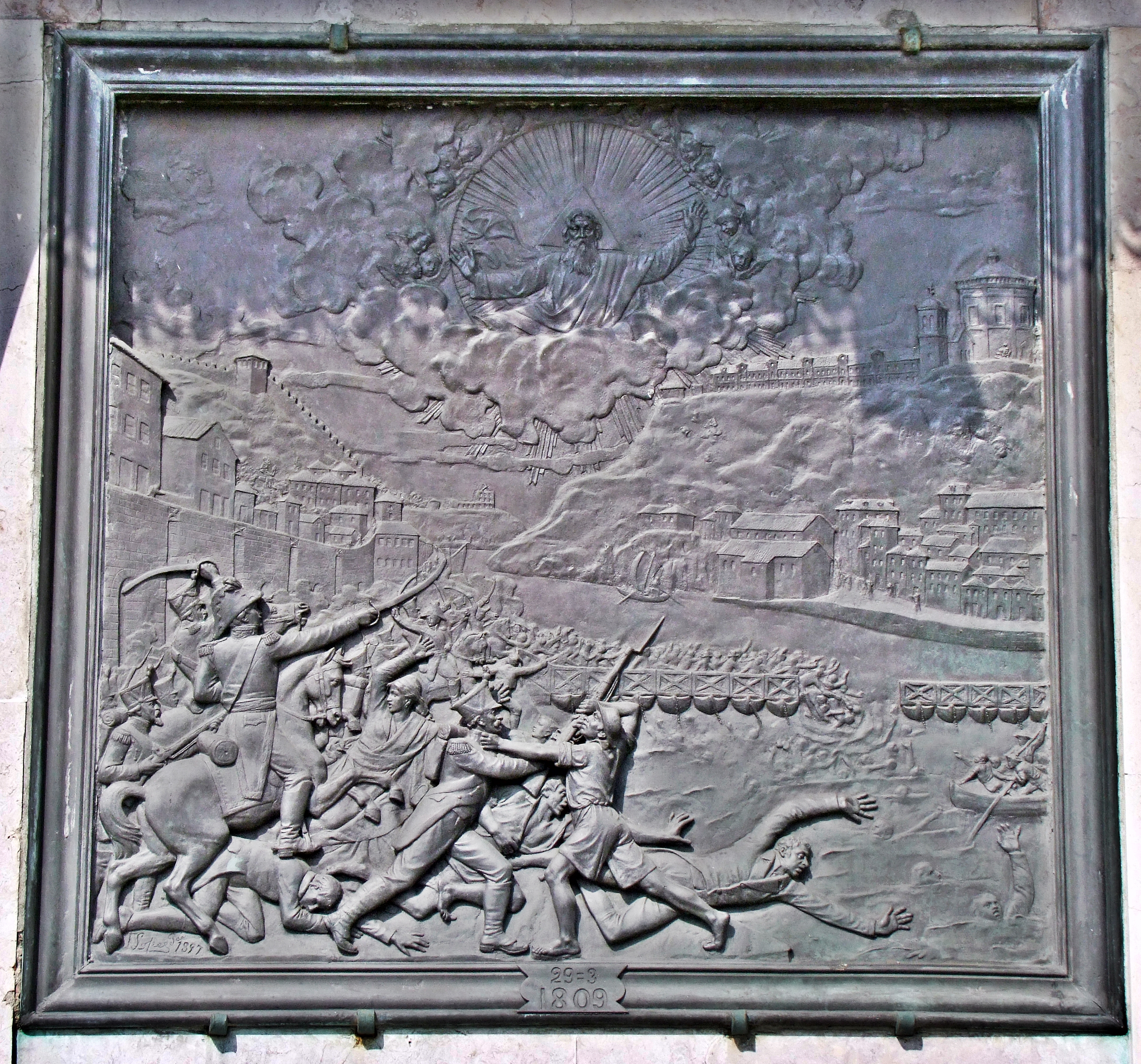
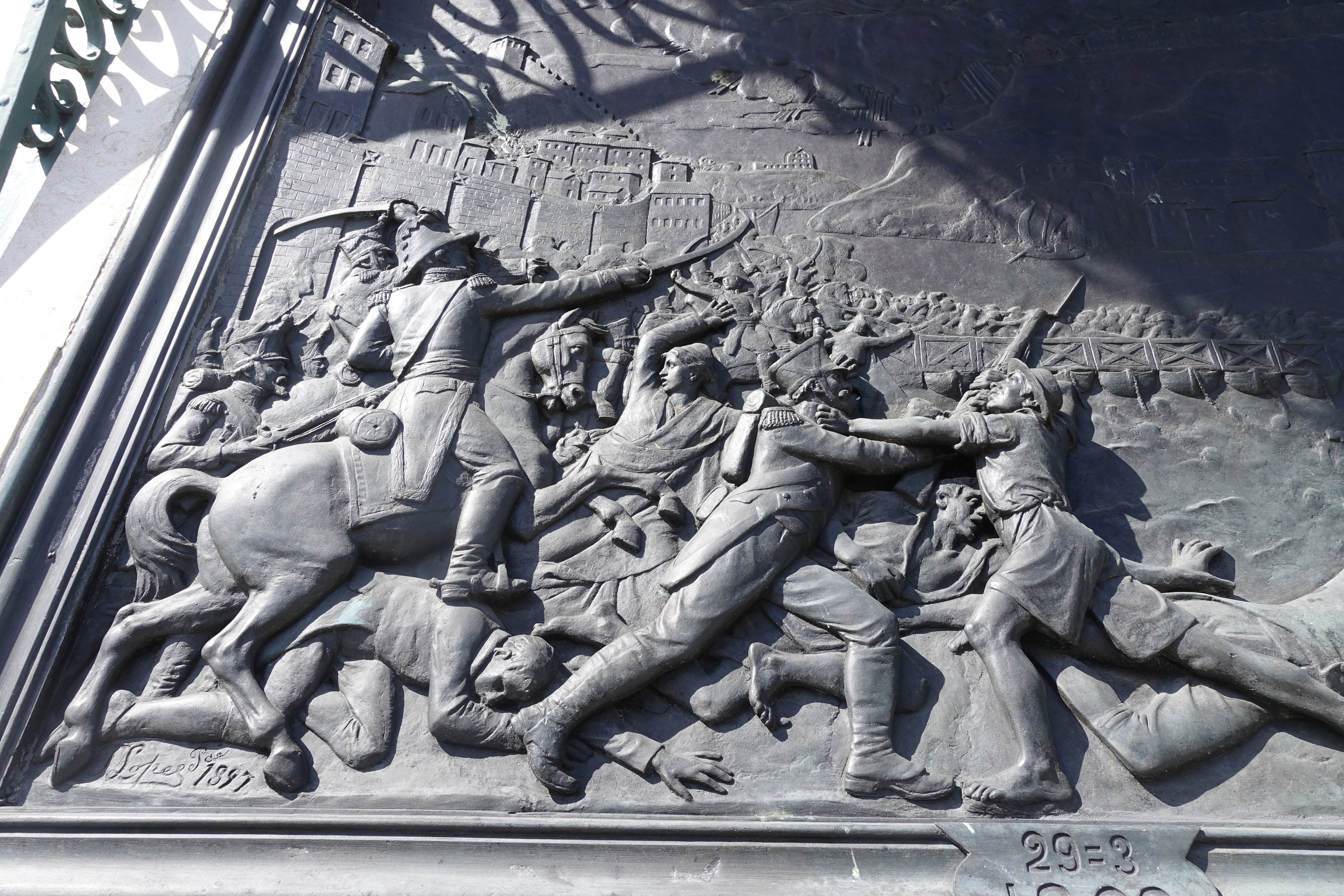
The shrine of the Alminhas da Ponte ("poor souls of the bridge") on the Porto Riverside with bas relief in bronze by José Joaquim Teixeira Lopes

A memorial painting, in oils on copper, showing the disaster was originally exhibited as part of a shrine on the Porto Ribeira (riverside) at the site of the bridge. Today this painting, attributed to António da Cunha, is displayed on the Altar of Souls of the nearby church of São José das Taipas, where the victims remains are interred. It was replaced at the shrine on the Ribeira (known as the Altar of the Alminhas da Ponte, "Poor Souls of the Bridge") by an 1897 piece in bronze by the sculptor José Joaquim Teixeira Lopes.

=== Monument to the Heroes of the Peninsular War ===
A 45 m (148 ft) twentieth century column in the middle of the Boavista Roundabout to the north west of the centre of Porto (Monumento aos Heróis da Guerra Peninsular) commemorates the victory of the Portuguese and the British against the French troops that invaded Portugal during the Peninsular War (1807–1814). The column, slowly built between 1909 and 1951, was a project by the celebrated Porto architect José Marques da Silva and the sculptor Alves de Sousa. The column is topped by a lion, the symbol of the joint Portuguese and British victory, which is bringing down the French Imperial Eagle. Around the base are sculptures of soldiers and civilians, the latter representing the people of Porto caught up in the boat bridge disaster.

=== 200th anniversary ===
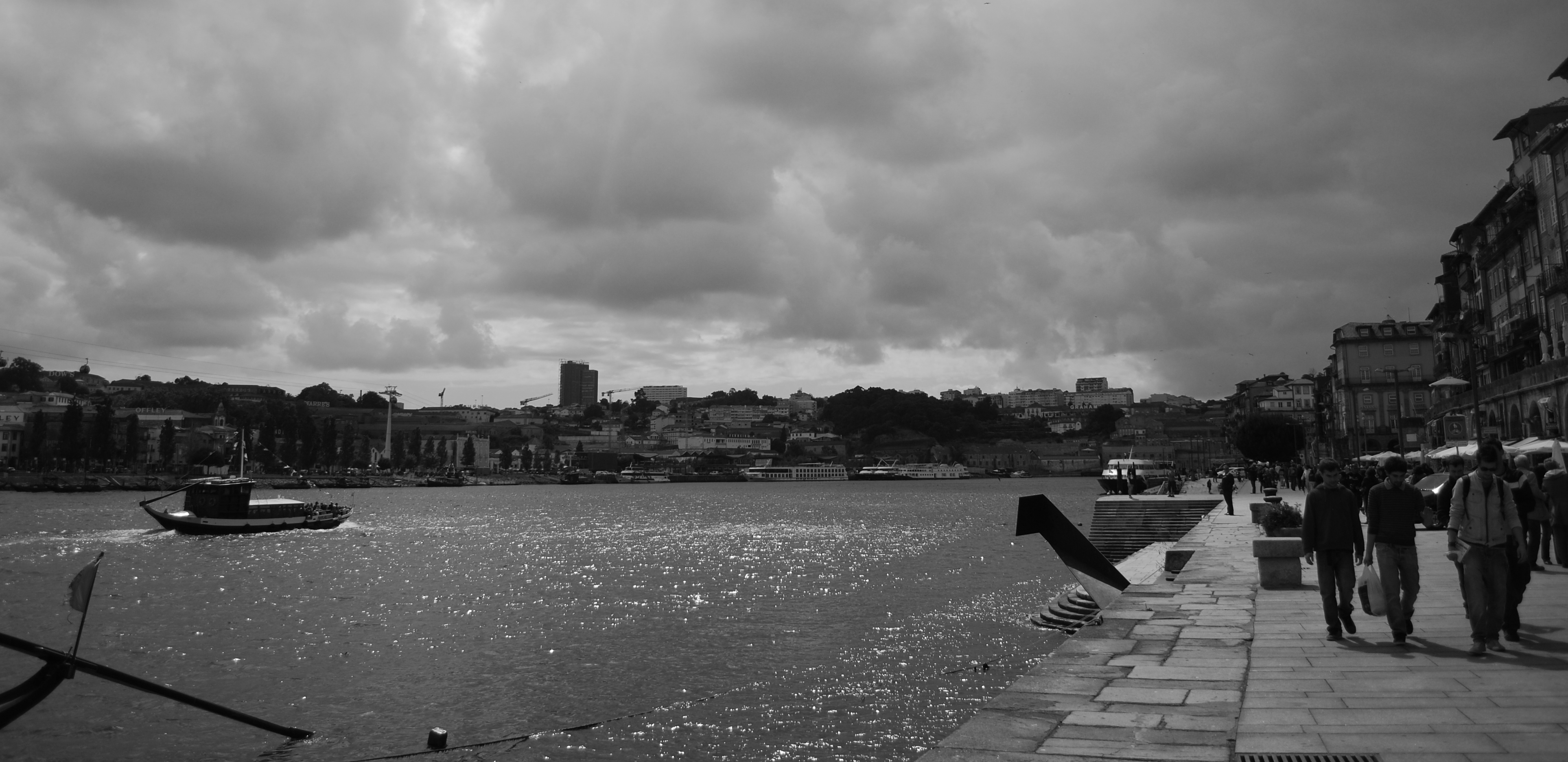
Porto river and the steel sculpture installed in 2009 at the spot where the bridge's cables were attached.

On 29 March 2009, the 200th anniversary of the disaster, the then President of Portugal, Aníbal Cavaco Silva attended a ceremony of commemoration in Porto and Gaia. He inaugurated a new sculpture consisting of steel elements marking the point where the cables of the Ponte das Barcas joined the Porto and Gaia riversides.
