= Nogueiró e Tenões =

- Civil parish
- Location in Portugal
- Coordinates: 41.548°N 8.384°W
- Country: Portugal
- Region: Norte
- Intermunic. comm.: Cávado
- District: Braga
- Municipality: Braga

Area
  - Total: 4.43 km^{2} (1.71 sq mi)

Population (2011)
  - Total: 5,129
  - Density: 1,160/km^{2} (3,000/sq mi)
- Time zone: UTC+00:00 (WET)
  - Summer (DST): UTC+01:00 (WEST)

Nogueiró e Tenões is a civil parish in the municipality of Braga, in the Portuguese district of the same name. It was formed in 2013 by the merger of the former parishes Nogueiró and Tenões. The population in 2011 was 5,129, in an area of 4.43 km^{2}.

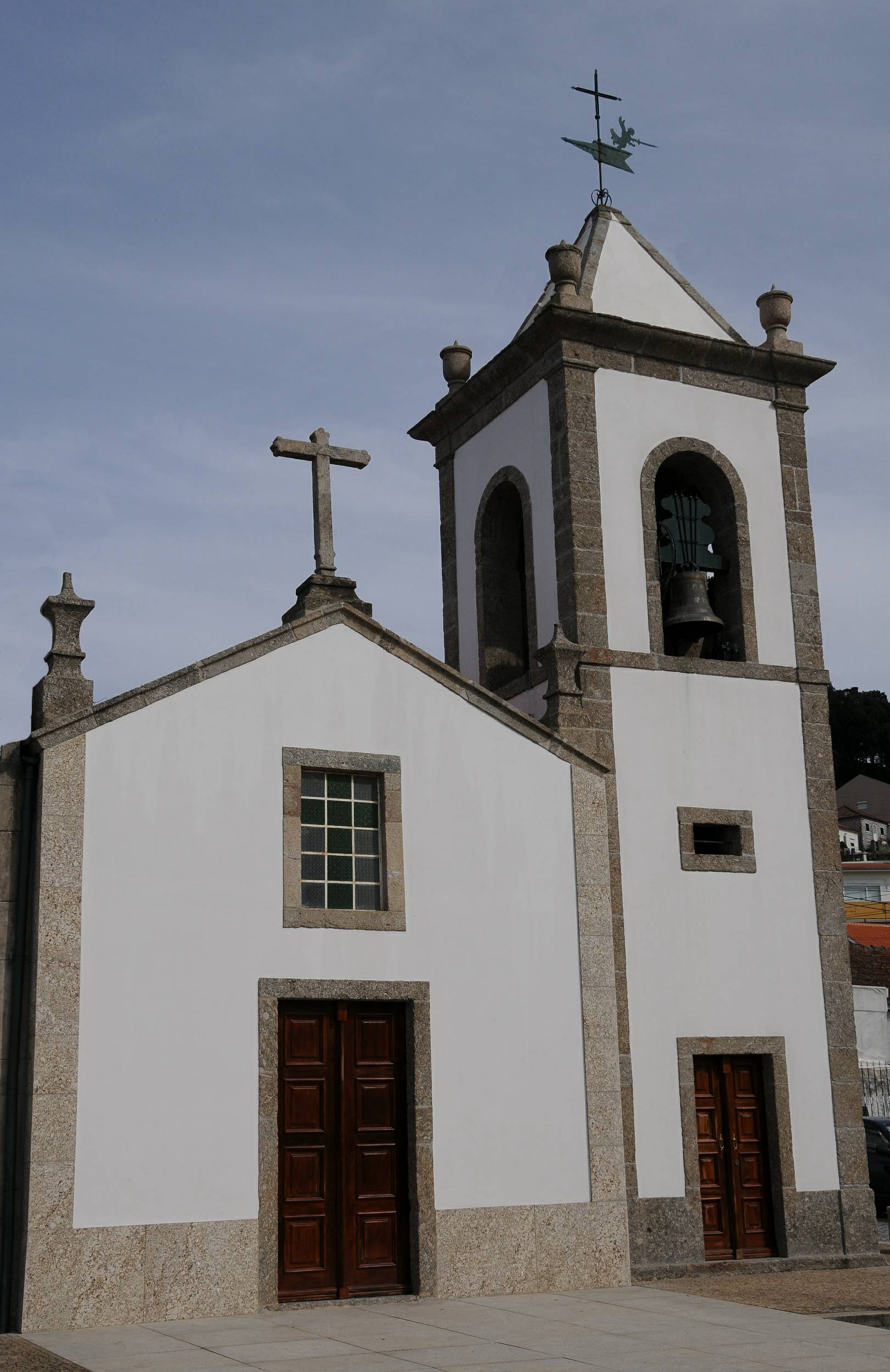
Nogueiró Church

== Architecture ==
- Bom Jesus do Monte
- Bom Jesus funicular
- Saint Eulália Church
