= António Teixeira Lopes =

Portuguese sculptor (1866–1942)

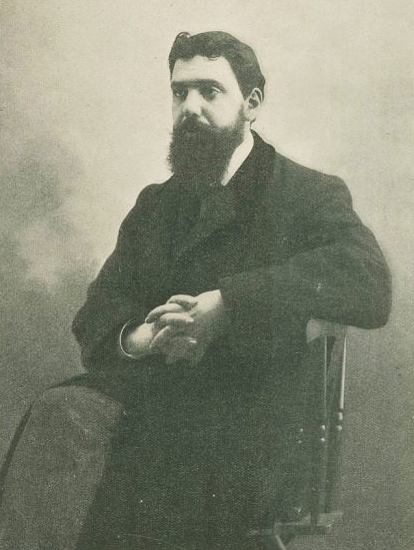
- Born: 27 October 1866; Vila Nova de Gaia, Portugal
- Died: 21 June 1942 (aged 75); Alijó, Portugal
- Occupation: Sculptor

António Teixeira Lopes (27 October 1866–21 June 1942) was a Portuguese sculptor.

== Life ==
Teixeira Lopes was the son of sculptor José Joaquim Teixeira Lopes and started learning his art in his father's workshop. In 1882 he entered the Academy of Fine Arts (Escola de Belas Artes) in Porto, where he continued his education with celebrated artists like sculptor António Soares dos Reis and painter João Marques de Oliveira. In 1885 he left for Paris, where he entered the École des Beaux-Arts and became a distinguished student.

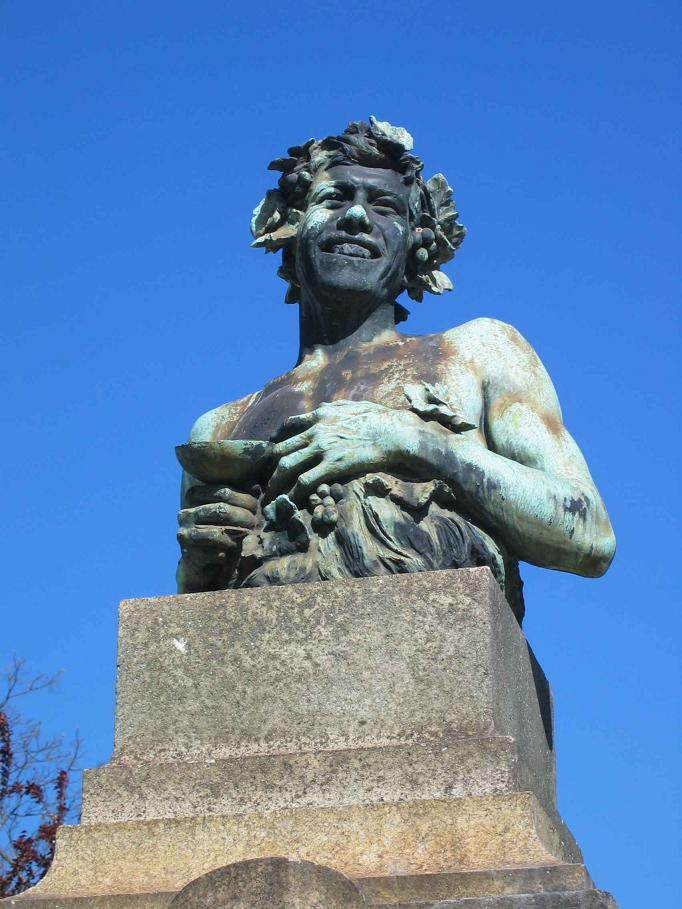
Bust of Bacchus (1916) by Teixeira Lopes in República Square in Porto.

Around 1895, together with his brother, architect José Teixeira Lopes, he built his atelier in Vila Nova de Gaia, which nowadays houses a museum (the Casa-Museu Teixeira Lopes) dedicated to his work. He was professor of the School of Fine Arts of Porto for many years.

== Works ==
Teixeira Lopes dealt mostly with allegoric, historical and religious themes, using clay, marble and bronze as materials. His vast work dots public spaces, palaces and churches in Portugal.

Infancia de Caim (Childhood of Cain) is housed by the Soares dos Reis National Museum
