= Brejoeira Palace =

Coordinates: 42.0415°N 8.4943°W

- Palácio da Brejoeira
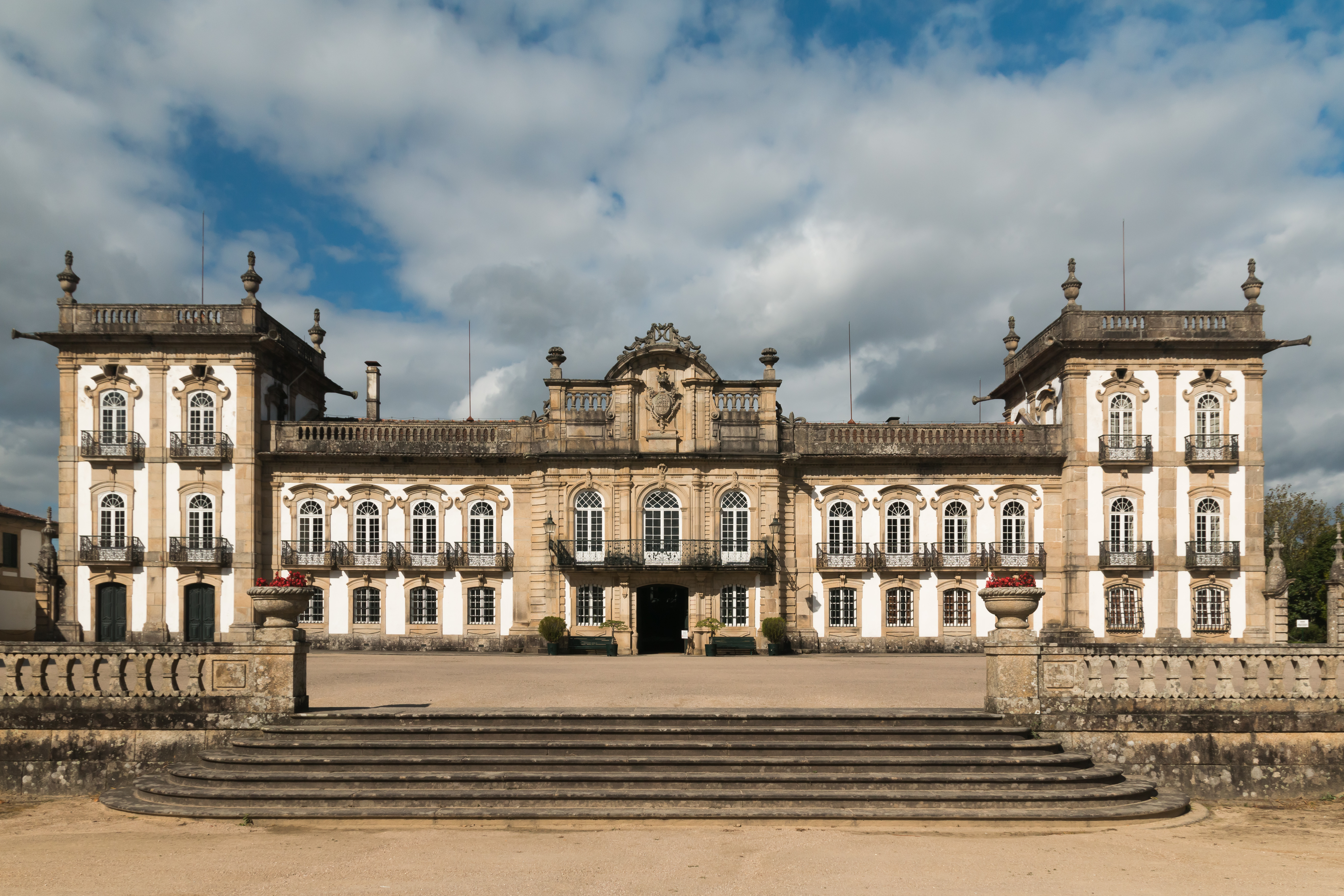
- Palace of Breijoeira's main facade
- Interactive map of the Brejoeira Palace area

General information
- Type: Palace
- Architectural style: Portuguese Northern Baroque
- Location: Monção, Portugal
- Construction started: 1805
- Completed: 1834
- Governing body: Private

Design and construction
- Architect: Carlos Amarante

Website
- Palácio da Brejoeira

The Brejoeira Palace (Portuguese: Palácio da Brejoeira) is a palace in Monção, Portugal.

The Palace was constructed in the 18th century according to a project from the architect Carlos Amarante.

It has been classified by IPPAR since 1910.

The palace opened for the public in 2010.
