= Saint Eulália Church (Tenões, Braga, Portugal) =

Church building in Braga, Braga District, Portugal

Coordinates: 41.5577°N 8.3859°W

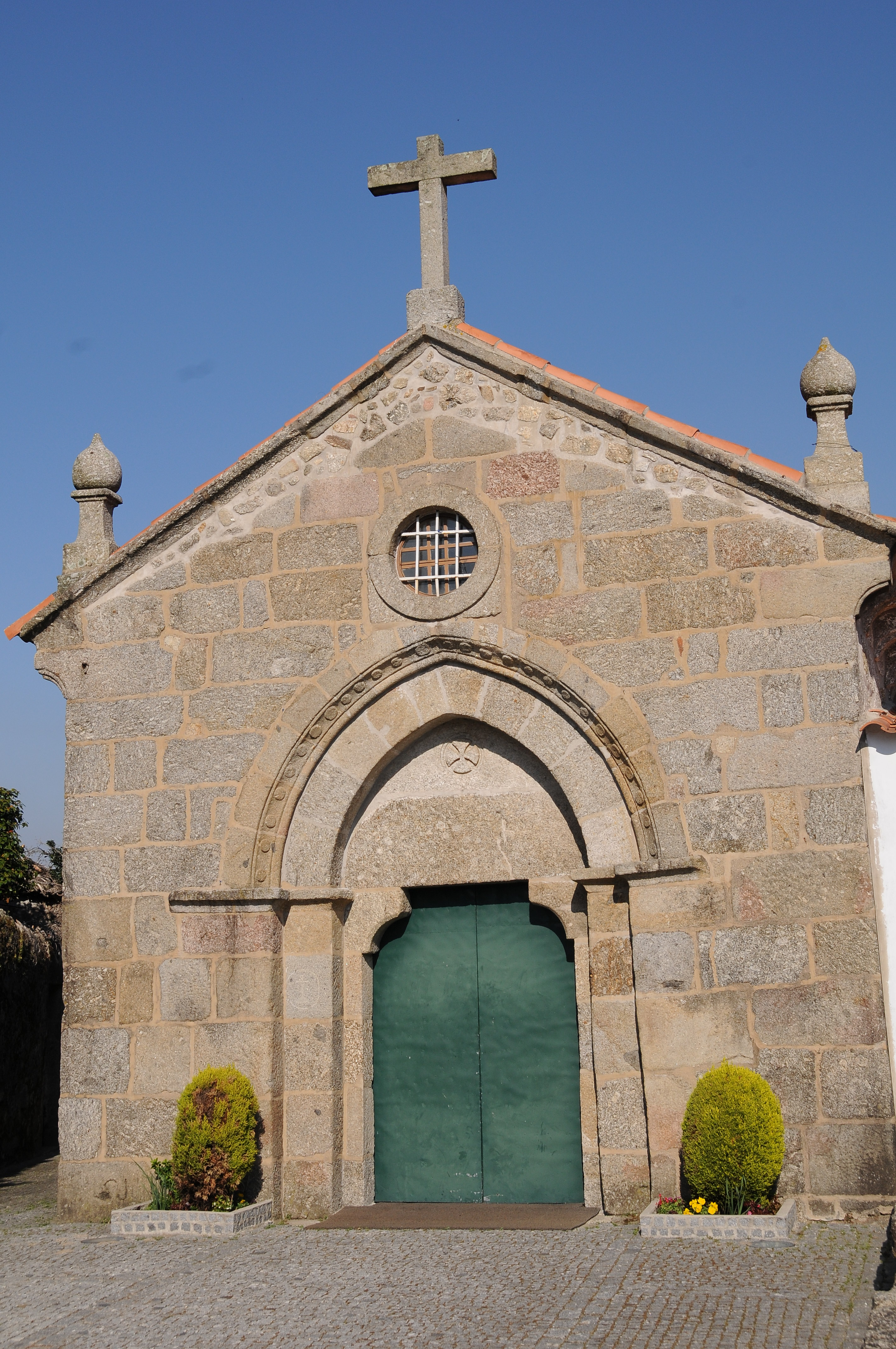
Saint Eulália Church-Braga

The Saint Eulália Church (Portuguese: Igreja de Santa Eulália) is a Romanesque Portuguese church in Tenões, Braga, Portugal, near Bom Jesus.

The church is dedicated to Saint Eulalia.

It is classified by IPPAR. since 1967.
