= José Joaquim Teixeira Lopes =

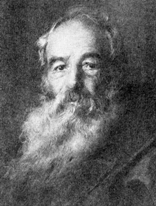
Image of José Joaquim

José Joaquim Teixeira Lopes, (Alijó, São Mamede de Ribatua, Portugal 24 February1837 – Vila Nova de Gaia, Portugal 16 March 1918) was a Portuguese sculptor and ceramicist. He is also known as Teixeira Lopes, Pai (father) to distinguish him from his sons António Teixeira Lopes, also a sculptor and José Teixeira Lopes (pt), an architect.

== Biography ==
Born the Tras os Montes village of São Mamede de Ribatua in the council of Alijó in 1837, Teixeira Lopes's father was a blacksmith and small scaler farmer. He did not have an artistic education but due to his obvious talent his parents sent him as an apprentice in the office of Manuel de Fonseca Pinto in Porto. At the age of 13 he was able as Fonseca Pinto's apprentice to carry out various tasks including the decoration of barges in the wharves of Vila Nova de Gaia. He became apprentice to a second master, Emídio Amatucci.

Later he entered as a student in the Academia Portuense de Belas Artes. Studying during the day, at night he would create images that his wife would sell in the markets of Gaia and Matosinhos.

In 1862, his proposal for a statue of Dom Pedro V for Batalha Square won a competition, with the work to be funded by the Council of Porto.

In 1864 he won a scholarship to travel to Paris where he stayed for two years, studying at the École Impériale de Beaux-Arts.

== Works ==
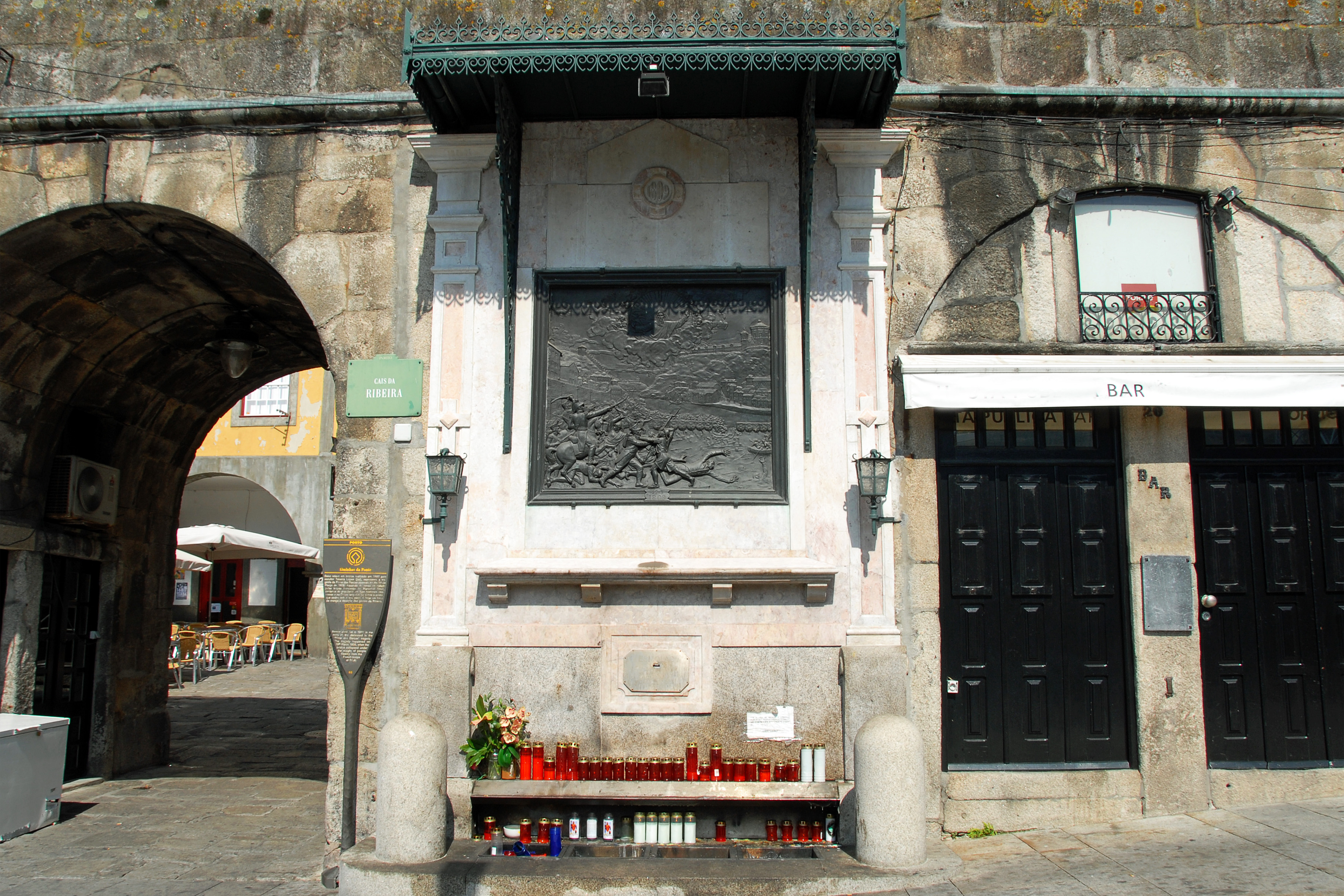
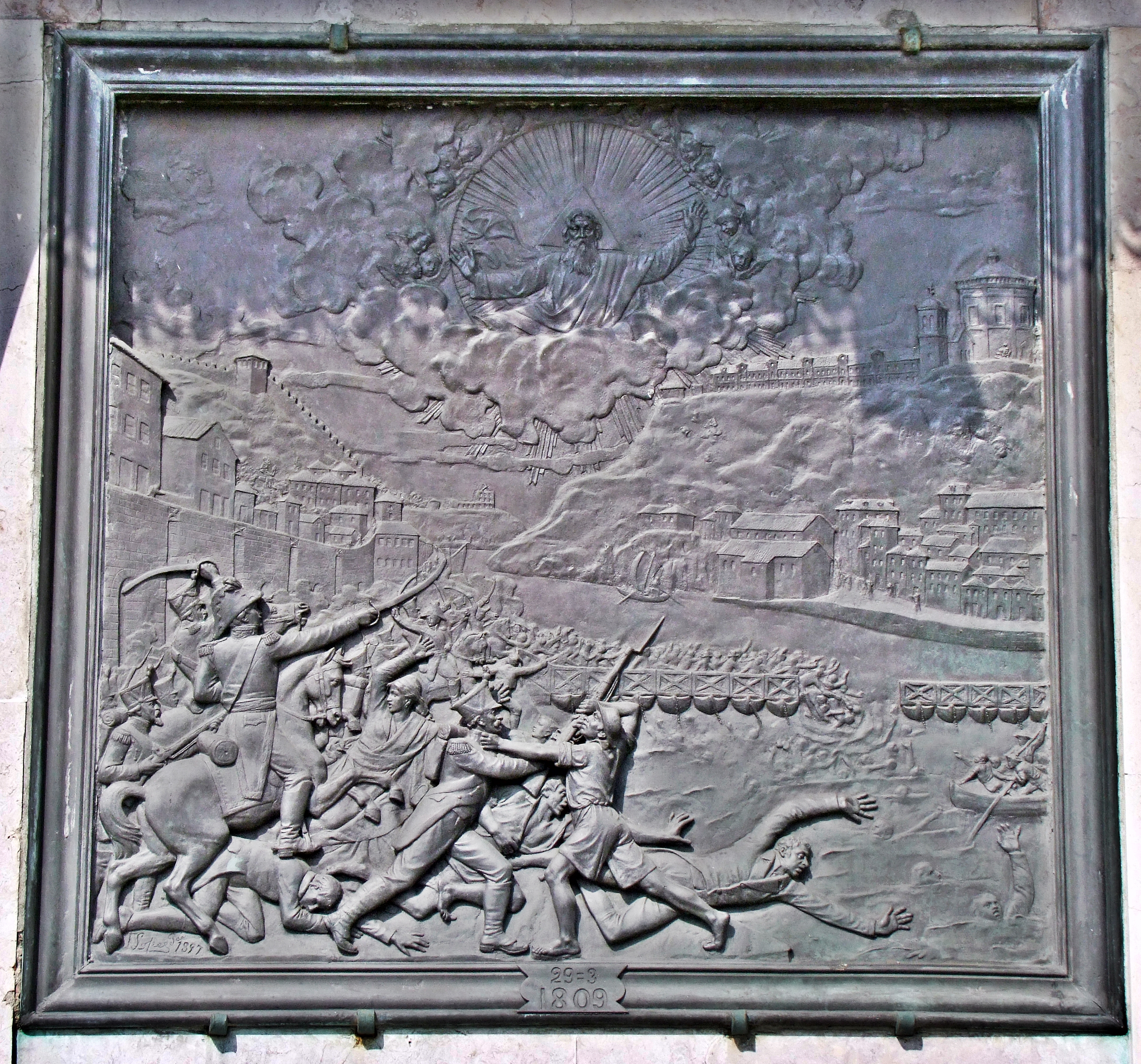
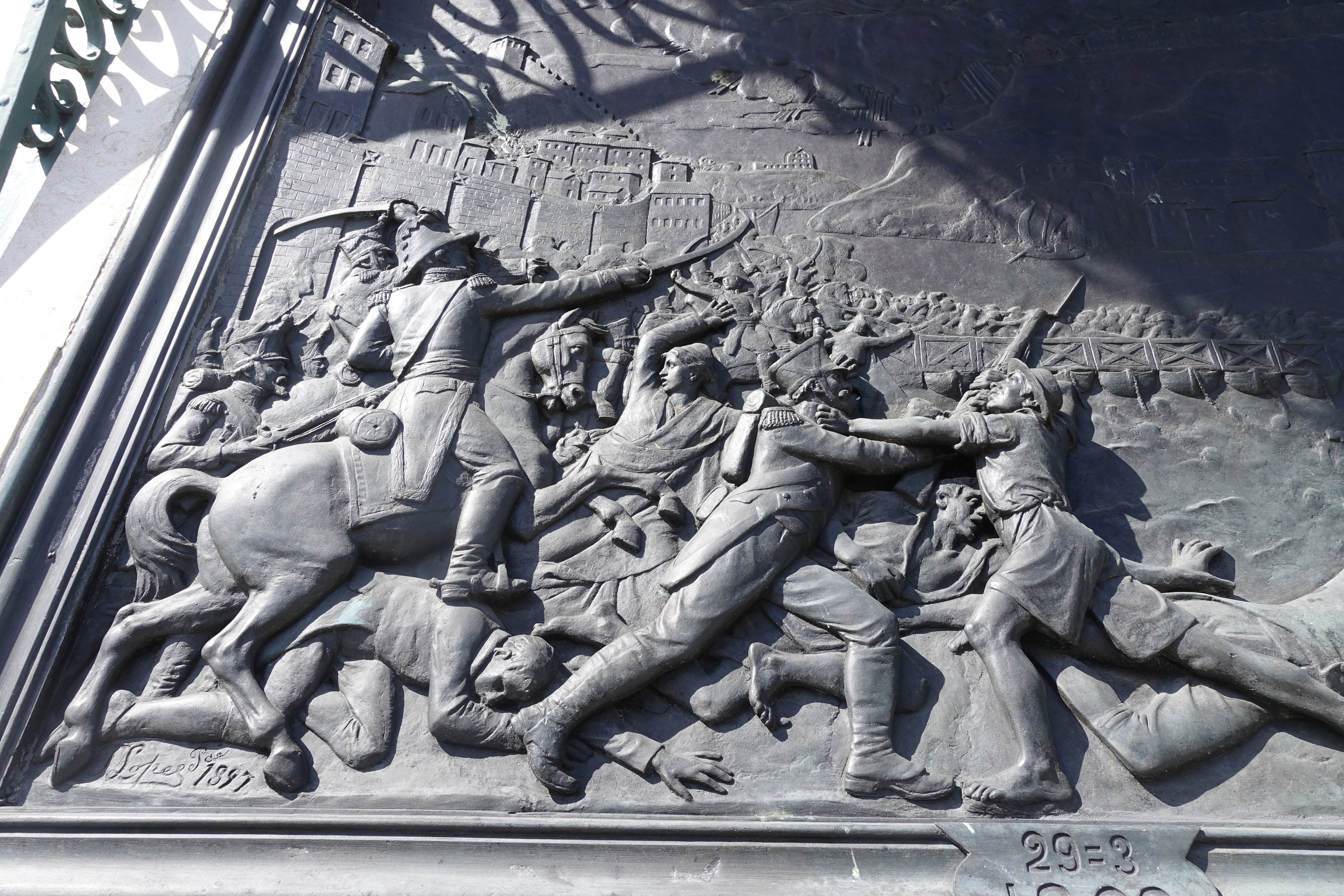
The shrine of the Alminhas da Ponte ("Poor Souls of the Bridge") on the Porto Riverside with bas relief in bronze by José Joaquim Teixeira Lopes

He was a prominent figure in the Portuguese Romantic movement. Among his works are a wide range of statues and bas reliefs as well as pieces in ceramics and painted tiles.

His works include:

- The statue of Passos Manuel in Matosinhos;
- The statue of D. Pedro V, in the Praça da Batalha in Porto (1862) — the first public monument of this type in the city;
- The bas-relief "Baptism of Christ" (in Porto cathedral)
- The bas-relief "Alminhas da Ponte" ("the poor souls of the bridge") in homage to the victims of the Porto Boat Bridge disaster at a shrine on the Porto Riverside.
