= Pópulo Church =

Coordinates: 41.5520°N 8.4288°W

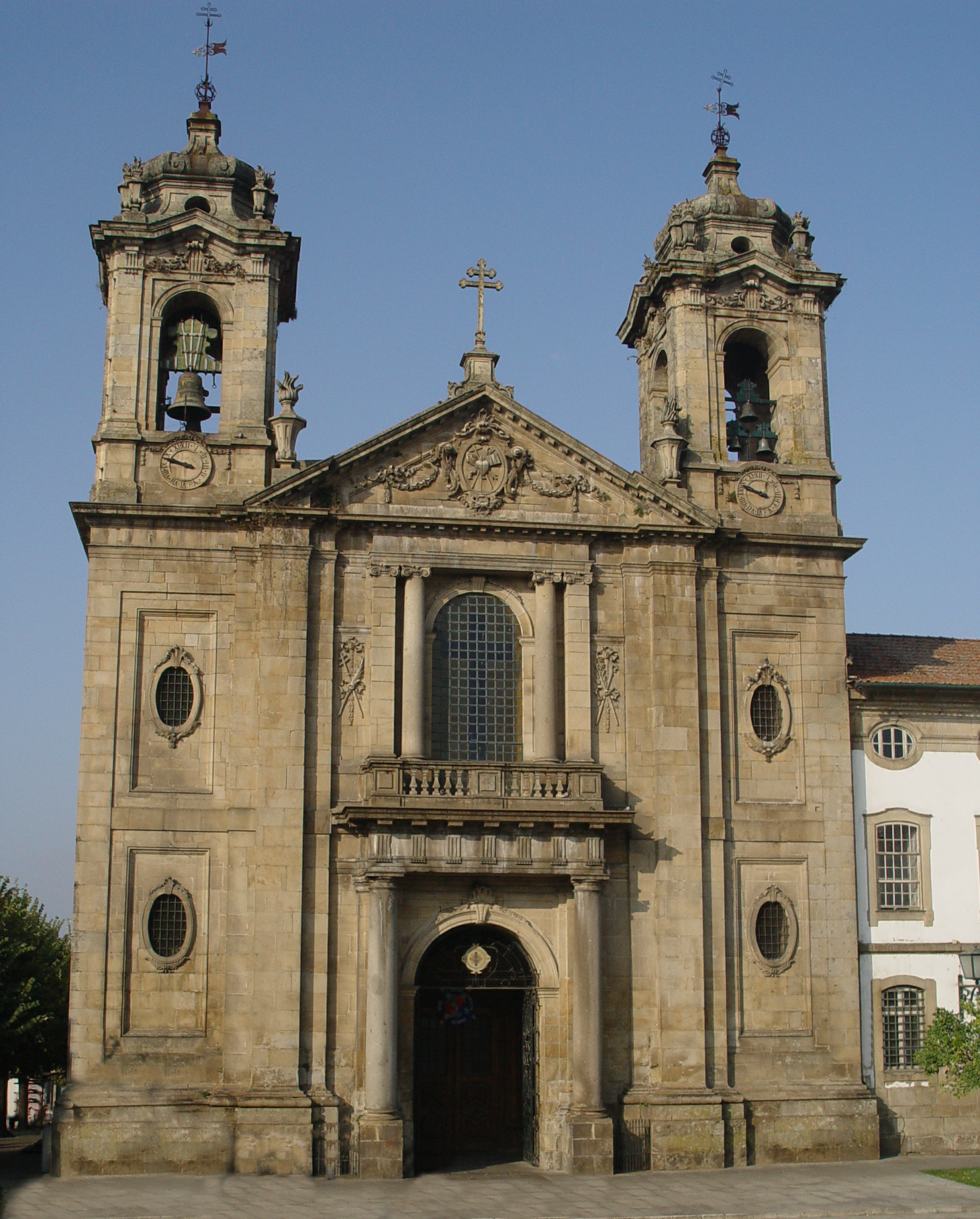
Pópulo Church

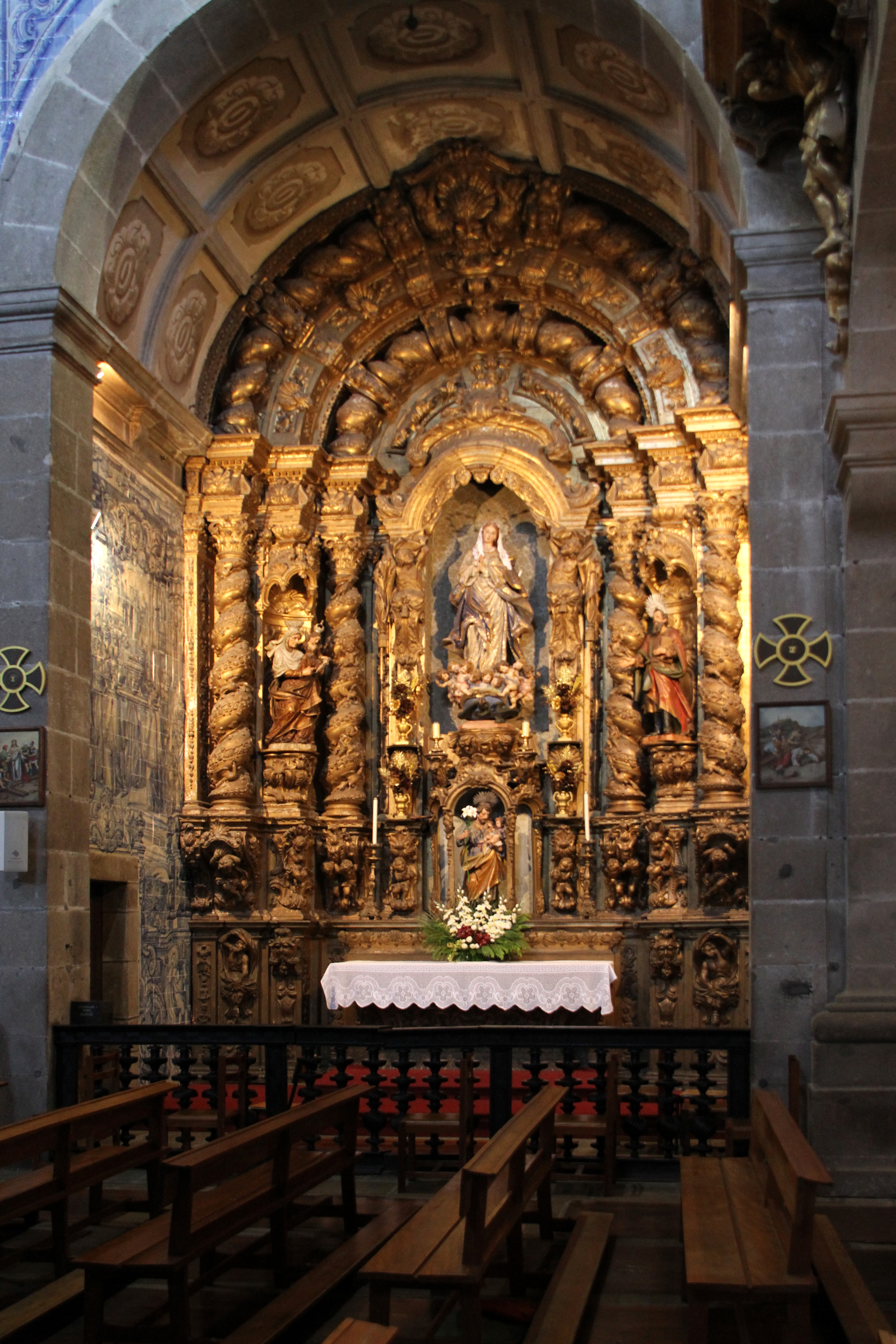
Interior of Pópulo Church

Pópulo Church (Portuguese: Igreja e Convento de Santa Maria del Popolo) is a Neoclassical church located in Braga, Portugal. The church has been classified as Property of Public Interest since 1977.

== About ==
The church's construction began at the end of the 16th century under the order of Archbishop D. Frei Agostinho de Jesus, to invoke the Virgin Mary who is glorified in Santa Maria del Popolo church in Rome.

Its front underwent some change in the 18th century to a Neoclassical style designed by Carlos Amarante, a Portuguese architect. Its interior is decorated with tiles with great pictorial value as well as its Baroque altar.

Close to the church, and belonging to the same architectural block is an ancient monastery, which is now part of the Town Hall Services.

== See also ==
List of churches in Portugal
