= Sanctuary of Bom Jesus do Monte =

Church building in Braga, Portugal

- Santuário do Bom Jesus do Monte
- Stairway and church of Bom Jesus do Monte

General information
- Location: Braga, Portugal
- Coordinates: 41°33′17.8″N 8°22′37.3″W

UNESCO World Heritage Site
- Official name: Sanctuary of Bom Jesus do Monte in Braga
- Criteria: Cultural: (iv)
- Reference: 1590
- Inscription: 2019 (43rd Session)
- Area: 26 ha (64 acres)
- Buffer zone: 232 ha (570 acres)

Portuguese National Monument
- Type: Non-movable
- Criteria: National Monument
- Designated: 15 December 2020
- Reference no.: IPA.00005694

The Sanctuary of Bom Jesus do Monte is a Portuguese Catholic shrine in Tenões, outside the city of Braga, in northern Portugal. Its name means Good Jesus of the Mount.

This sanctuary is a notable example of Christian pilgrimage site with a monumental, Baroque stairway that climbs 116 meters (381 feet). It is an important tourist attraction in Braga.

On 7 July 2019, the Sanctuary of Bom Jesus do Monte in Braga was inscribed as a UNESCO World Heritage Site.

== History ==
Many hilltops in Portugal and other parts of Europe have been sites of religious devotion since antiquity, and it is possible that the Bom Jesus hill was one of these. However, the first indication of a chapel over the hill dates from 1373. This chapel - dedicated to the Holy Cross - was rebuilt in the 15th and 16th centuries. In 1629 a pilgrimage church was built dedicated to the Bom Jesus (Good Jesus), with six chapels dedicated to the Passion of Christ.

The present Sanctuary’s construction started in 1722, under the patronage of the Archbishop of Braga, Rodrigo de Moura Telles. His coat of arms is seen over the gateway, in the beginning of the stairway. Under his direction the first stairway row, with chapels dedicated to the Via Crucis, were completed. Each chapel is decorated with terra cotta sculptures depicting the Passion of Christ. He also sponsored the next segment of stairways, which has a zigzag shape and is dedicated to the Five Senses. Each sense (Sight, Smell, Hearing, Touch, Taste) is represented by a different fountain. At the end of this stairway, a Baroque church was built around 1725 by architect Manuel Pinto Vilalobos.

The first chapels, stairway and church works extended through the 18th century. In an area behind the church (the Terreiro dos Evangelistas), three octagonal chapels were built in the 1760s with statues depicting episodes that occur after the Crucifixion, such as the meeting of Jesus with Mary Magdalene. The exterior design of the beautiful chapels is attributed to renowned Braga architect André Soares. Around these chapels there are four Baroque fountains with statues of the Evangelists, also dating from the 1760s.

Around 1781, archbishop Gaspar de Bragança decided to complete the ensemble by adding a third segment of stairways and a new church. The third stairway also follows a zigzag pattern and is dedicated to the Three Theological Virtues: Faith, Hope and Charity, each with its fountain. Overall the staircase has 583 steps. The old church was demolished and a new one was built following a Neoclassic design by architect Carlos Amarante. This new church, began in 1784, had its interior decorated in the beginning of the 19th century and was consecrated in 1834. The main altarpiece is dedicated to the Crucifixion.

In the 19th century, the area around the church and stairway was expropriated and turned into a park. In 1882, to facilitate the access to the Sanctuary, the water balance Bom Jesus funicular was built linking the city of Braga to the hill. This was the first funicular to be built in the Iberian Peninsula and is still in use.

The Sanctuary has been classified as Property of Public Interest since 1970.

== Significance ==
The design of the Sanctuary of Bom Jesus, with its Baroque nature emphasised by the zigzag form of its stairways, influenced many other sites in Portugal (such as the Santuário de Nossa Senhora dos Remédios in Lamego) and the Santuário do Bom Jesus de Matosinhos in Congonhas, Minas Gerais, in Brazil. As the pilgrims climbed the stairs, (by tradition encouraged to do so on their knees) they encountered a theological programme that contrasted the senses of the material world with the virtues of the spirit, at the same time as they experienced the scenes of the Passion of Christ. The culmination of the effort was the temple of God, the church on the top of the hill. The presence of several fountains along the stairways give the idea of purification of the faithful.

The new church (built 1784–1834) by Carlos Amarante was one of the first Neoclassic churches in Portugal.

This church was elevated to a Minor Basilica status on 5 July 2015 by Pope Francis.

== Gallery ==
Stairway of the Three Theological Virtues below the basilica

Main façade and bell towers of the basilica

Nave looking toward the high altar

High altar, with a sculpted Crucifixion scene beneath a gilded canopy

Inside the basilica dome

Pipe organ with gilded case

Terreiro dos Evangelistas

A garden pavilion above the grotto

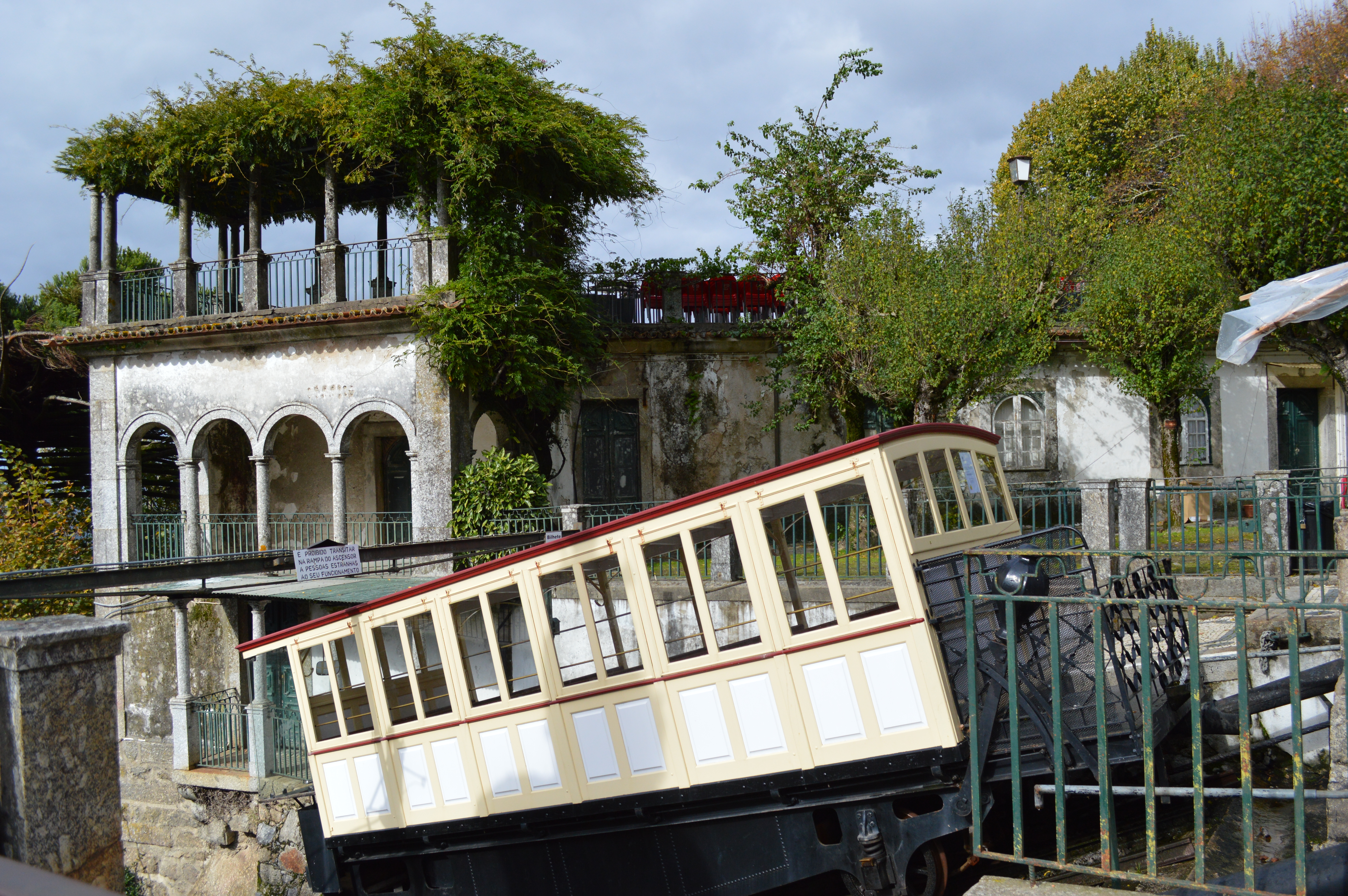
Bom Jesus funicular

== See also ==
- Bom Jesus do Monte Funicular
- Sanctuary of Our Lady of Sameiro
- Sacri Monti of Piedmont and Lombardy
