= Fort of São Francisco Xavier =

Fort in Porto, Portugal

Coordinates: 41.169°N 8.690°W

Forte de São Francisco Xavier
- Fort of São Francisco Xavier
- Porto, Grande Porto, Norte in Portugal

Site information
- Type: Fort
- Owner: Portuguese Republic
- Open to the public: Public

Site history
- Built: 6th century
- Materials: Granite, Wood, Metal/Steel

The Fort of São Francisco Xavier (Portuguese: Forte de São Francisco Xavier), commonly known as the 'Castelo do Queijo' (Cheese Castle), is a fortification situated on the coast of the civil parish of Nevogilde in the northern Portuguese municipality of Porto.

== History ==
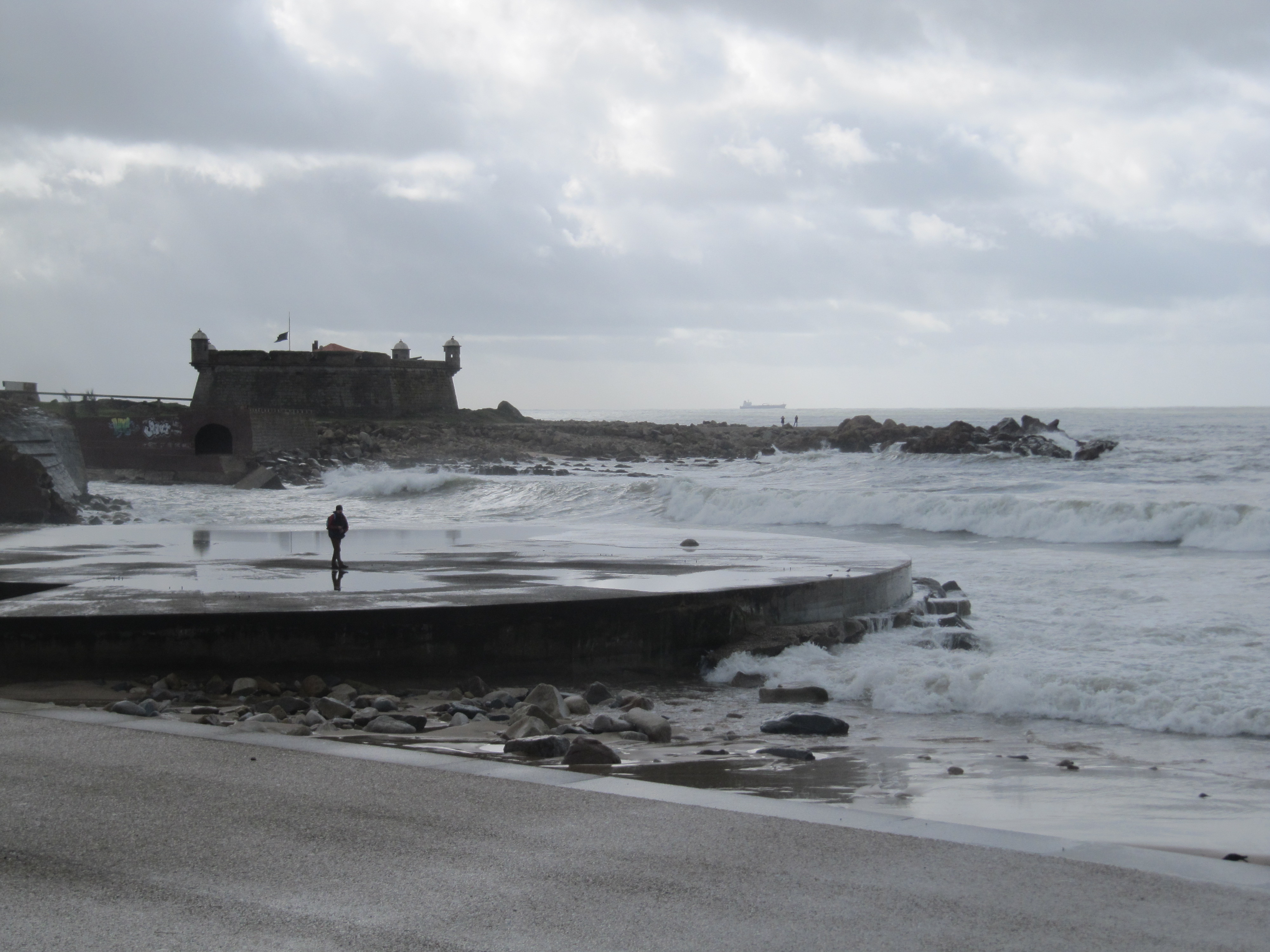
A perspective of the fortress along the coast

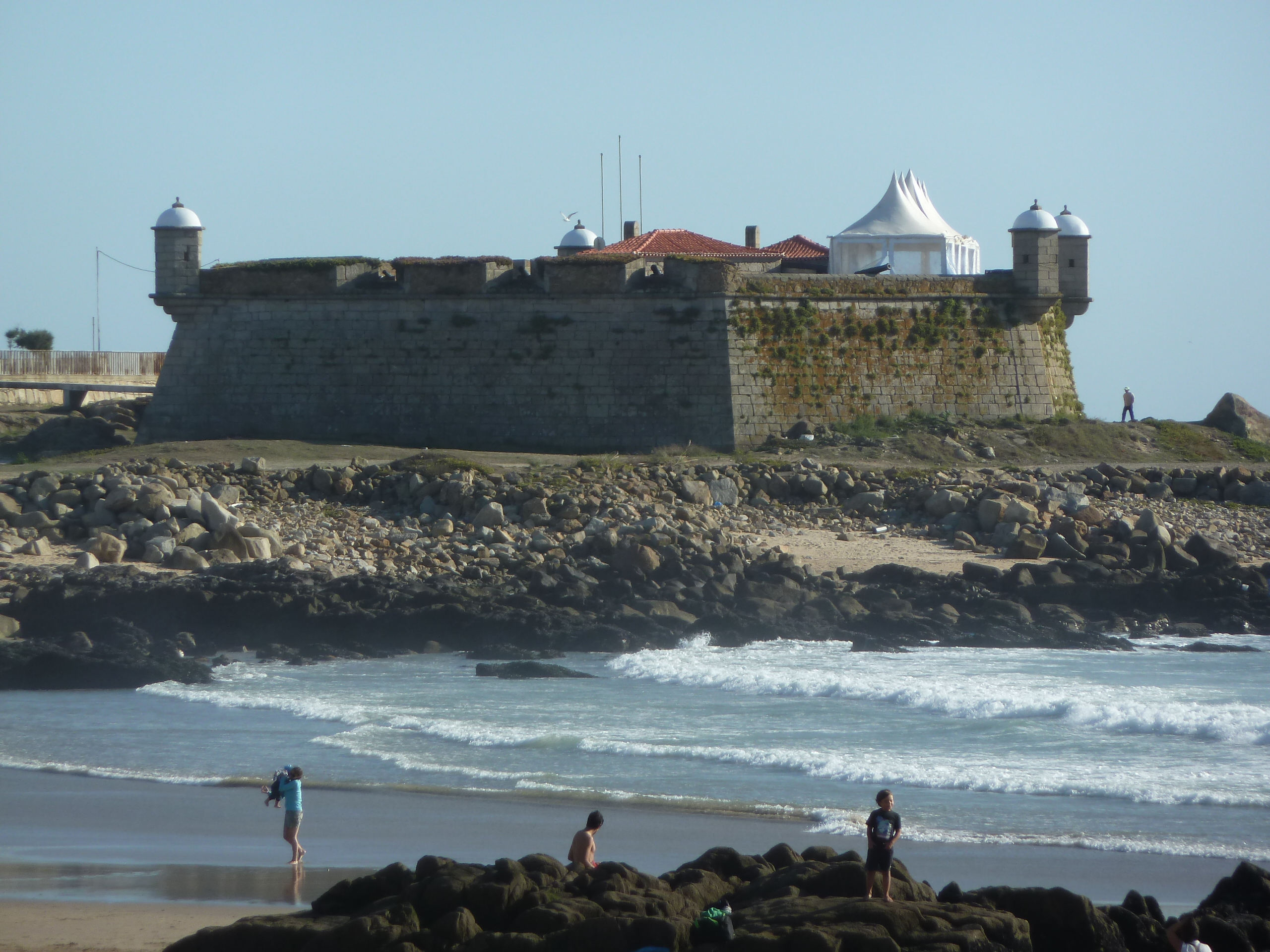
Lateral slopes walls of the fortification

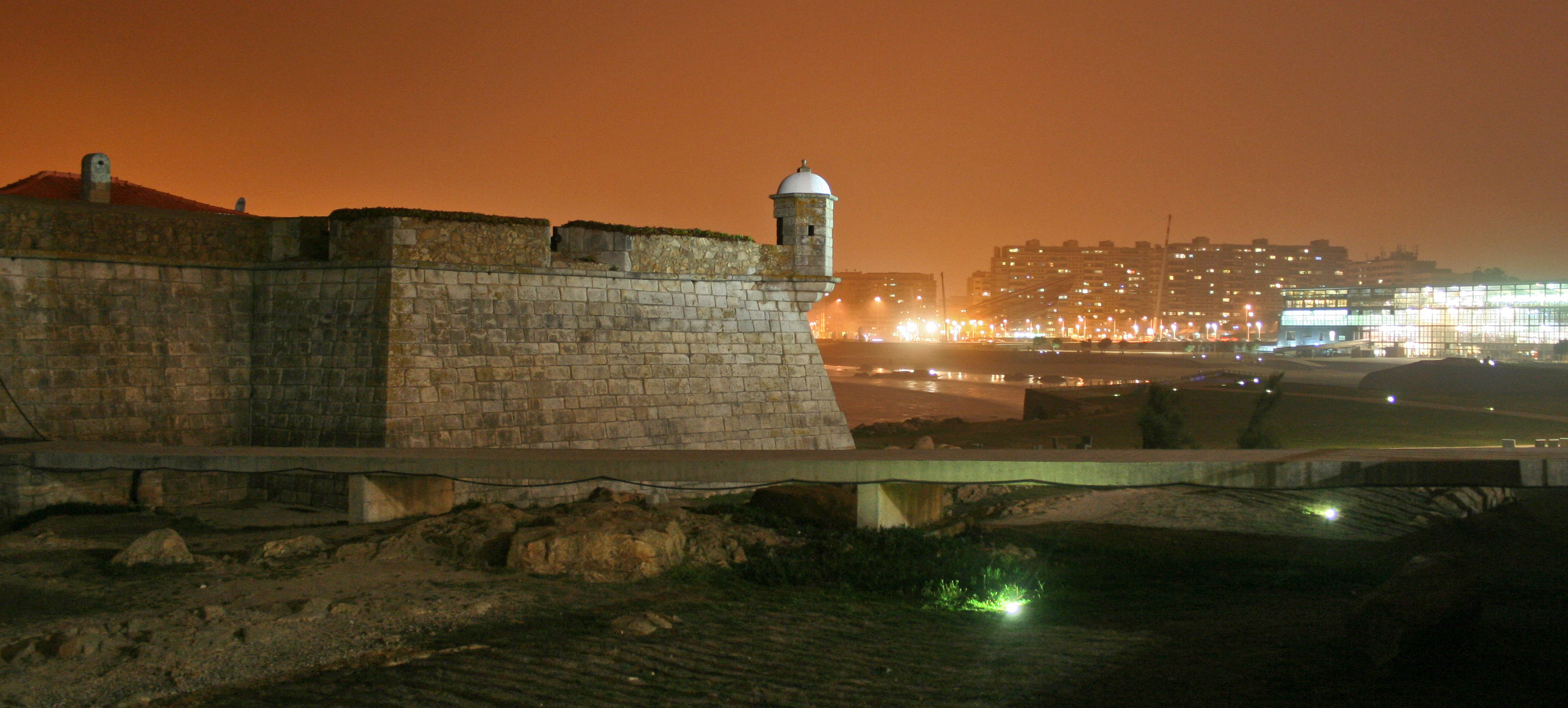
A view of the fortification in the evening

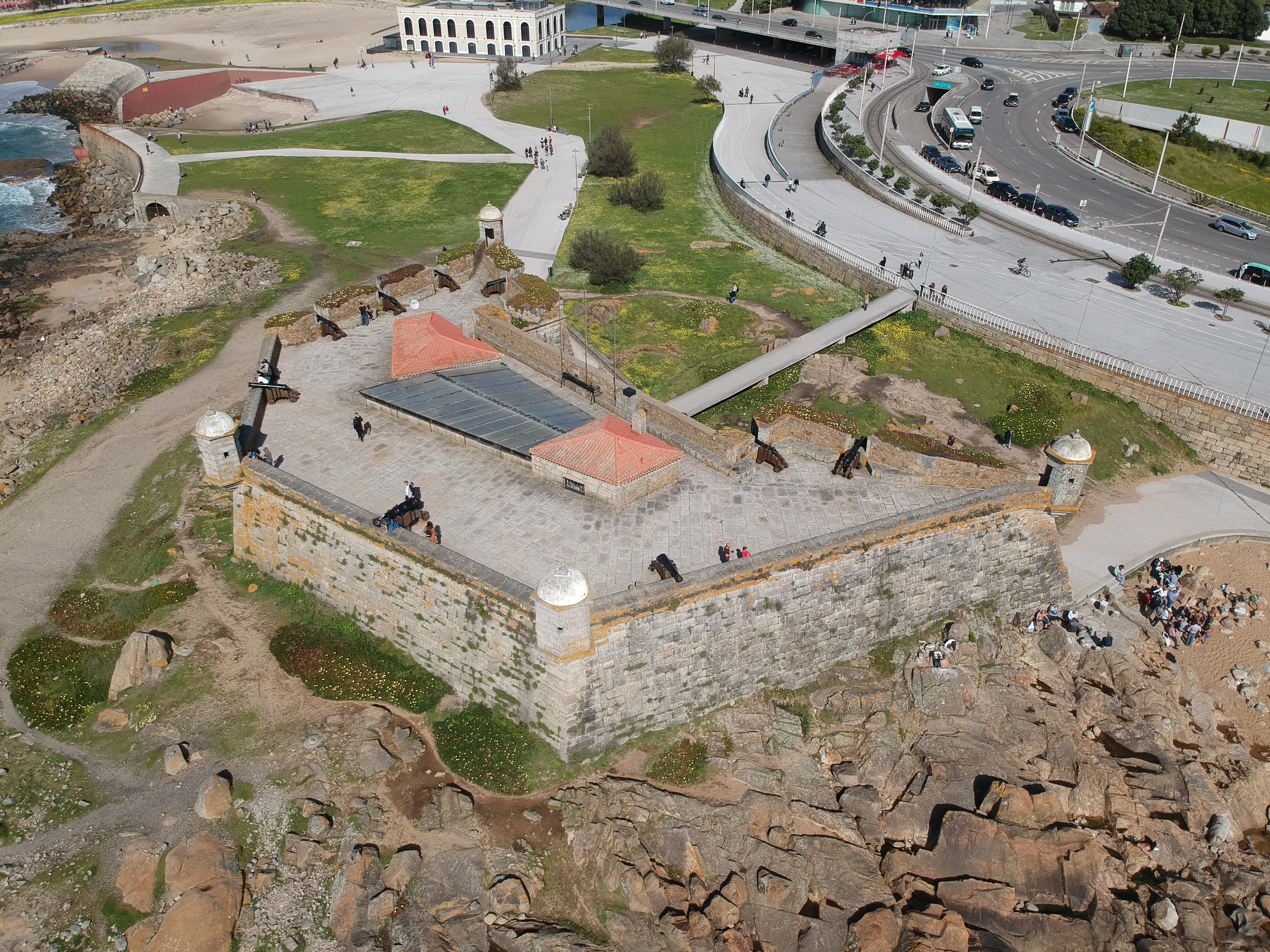
Aerial view

In early era of settlement, the rocky area of Queijo was sacred to the Draganes, a Celtic tribe that arrived in the 6th century.

The fortification was likely constructed sometime in the 15th century, over the primitive structure that already existed. King John IV of Portugal ordered the construction of a new fort in 1643, designed by French military engineer Miguel de l'Ècole, and directed by Fernando César de Carvalhais Negreiros, then Captain of the Royal Armada (Portuguese: Capitão da Armada Real).

No one knows when the Castle of São Francisco Xavier was founded; it is presumed to be between 1661 and 1662, when the coast was under threat of the armada of Galicia.

Judges and municipal aldermen for the city of Porto, captain António Pires Picão and various other carrack and caravel captains arrived at the conclusion in 1643 that the fort was badly located, owing to a lack of safe area for disembarking. This as the area was rocky and influenced by strong waters. Friar João Turriano, engineer of the Kingdom, was asked to give his opinion and he determined that that fortification should be constructed away from the site, in the locality of Pedra do Queijo (using the existing materials).

During the Restoration Wars, the fort was rebuilt (at the expense of the city), at a time when citizenry feared attacks from squadrons of Spanish fleets.

By 1717, the city of Porto was responsible for the maintenance of the fort, a heavy burden for municipal coffers, and forcing the town council to petition King John V of Portugal to decommission the fort, owing to its superfluous need. As they mentioned, the fort:

was a great expense in the Coffers of the City, in the payment of officials that were created to assist the said Castle, where they don't reside, taking advantage of the convenience of the land.

Yet, the King's Council of War, indifferent to the suggest, maintained the fortress active. In 1751, a private chapel was constructed to assist military officers serving at the site.

On 11 April 1758, abbey Manoel da Silva Pereira, referred to a lieutenant (as captain/commander), a constable, Sargent, 11 artillerymen stationed at the fort, including unspecified soldiers that were sent to the fort time-to-time, which pertained to the regiment in Porto. But, by 1804 its usefulness had waned, and could not fulfill its function, given military tactics of the time. Between 1807 and 1811, during the French invasion, the fort was not used in a defensive role.

During the siege of Porto (1832-1833), Miguelist forces occupied the fort until Lordelo, even as they were confronted by batteries and the Liberal navy. By the end of the civil war the fort was destroyed. In August 1860, a plan of the fort included drawbridge, residence of the Governor, chapel in ruins, housing for military officers also in ruins, a ramp to the esplanade, moat, areas inundated by the sea, four quarters for soldiers, kitchen, powder magazine and a vaulted house for quarters. It was assigned for the Veterans Company (1839), during the revolt of Maria da Fonte (1846), and occupied by troops from the Junta of Porto, and was bombarded by the frigate Íris, supporting the government of Maria II.

Between 1890 and 1910 it was in the possession of the Guarda Fiscal (Fiscal Guard).

In 1934 it was classified as a Property of Public Interest.

The Municipal Commission for Art and Archaeology (Portuguese: Comissão Municipal de Arte e Arqueologia) proposed that the fort be adapted for the use as a museum in 1938. Following restoration work in 1942, the fort was once again abandoned, and the spaces were reactivated in 1943 during the course of the World War, when anti-aircraft batteries were installed, fearing German attacks. In order to collect funds to assist the paying for a permanent guard, the fort's doors were opened to the public: the fort was used as overlook, for a charge one escudo.

The Junta Freguesia of Nevogilde installed some services in the fort in April 1944. Immediately, within the year, the junta received orders to remove the equipment from the site by the Direcção Geral da Fazenda Pública (General Directorate for Public Finances), which provoked indignation by the city council. But, by 1949 the Junta de Freguesia continued to have their installations in the fort. They shared the spaces with a naval brigade from the Portuguese Legion, remaining there until 25 April 1974. Between 1977 and 1978, the post was held by northern commandos.

On 26 April 1961, the site was included in the Special Protection Zone. On 24 September 2008, the DRCNorte proposed that the fort be included in the maritime promenade and Avenida de Montevideu designation which, by 7 January 2009, was accepted by the consultative council of IGESPAR.

== Architecture ==
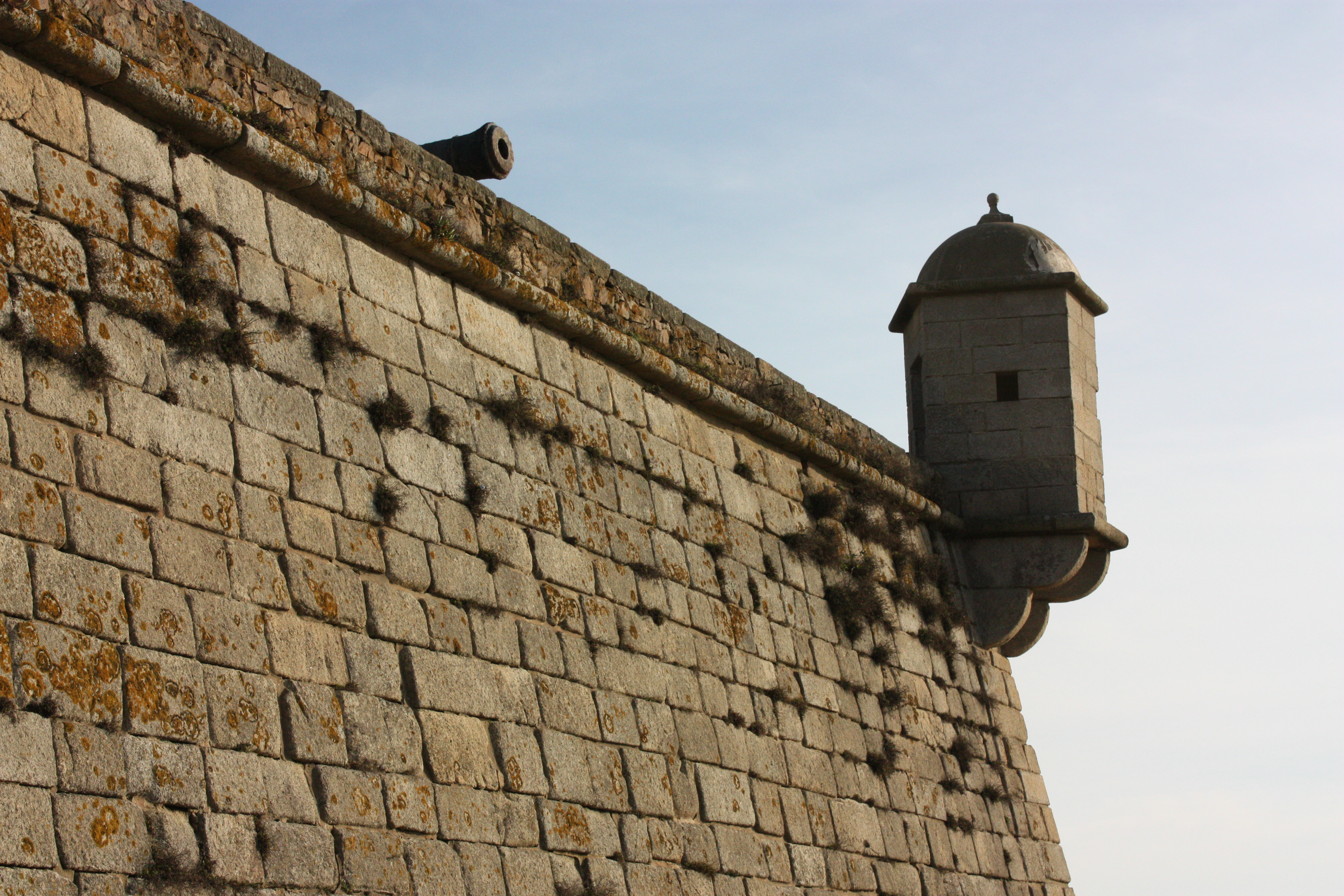
A watchtower at one of the corners, showing the rounded roof and ornamental cornices

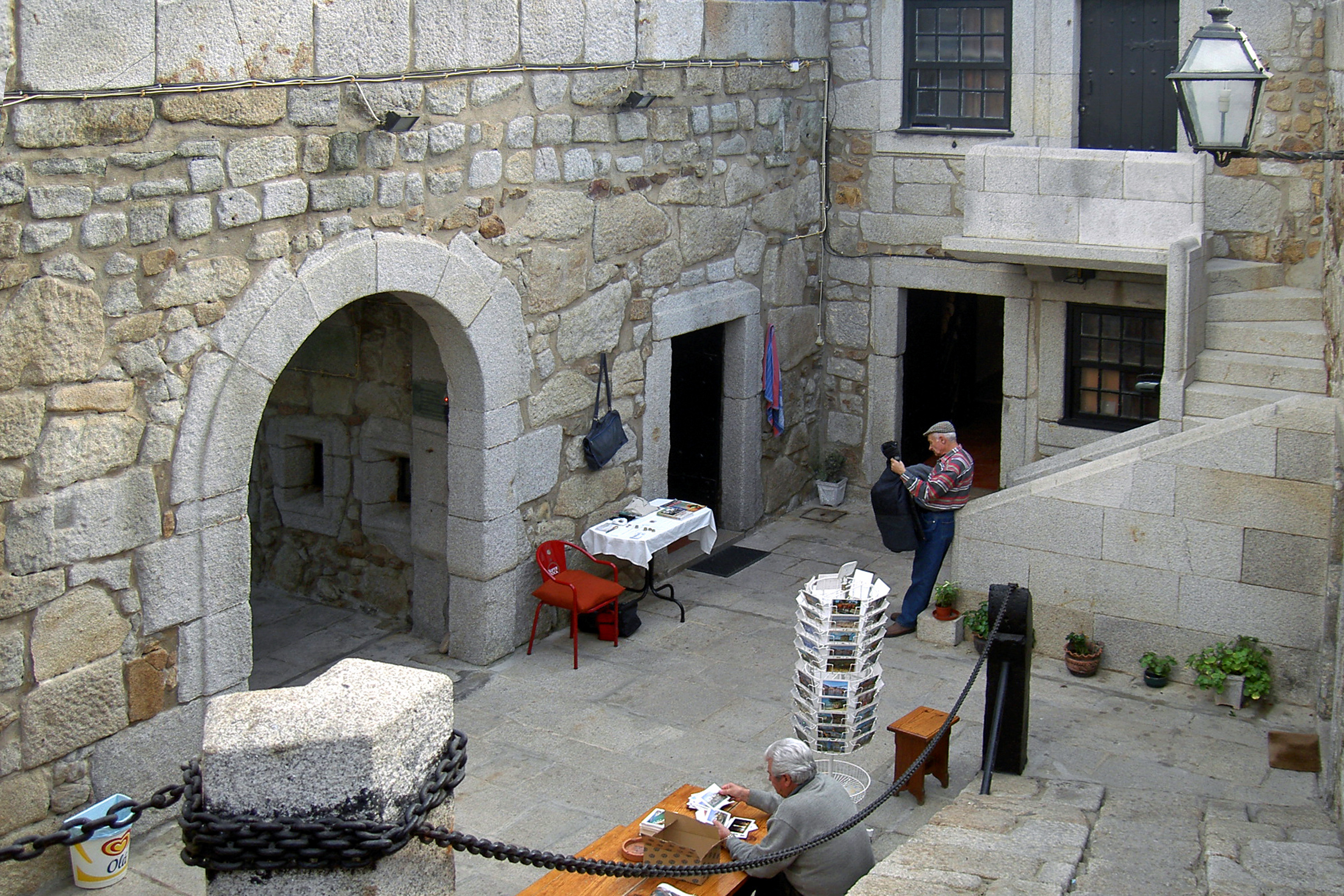
A view of the interior courtyard from the main gateway

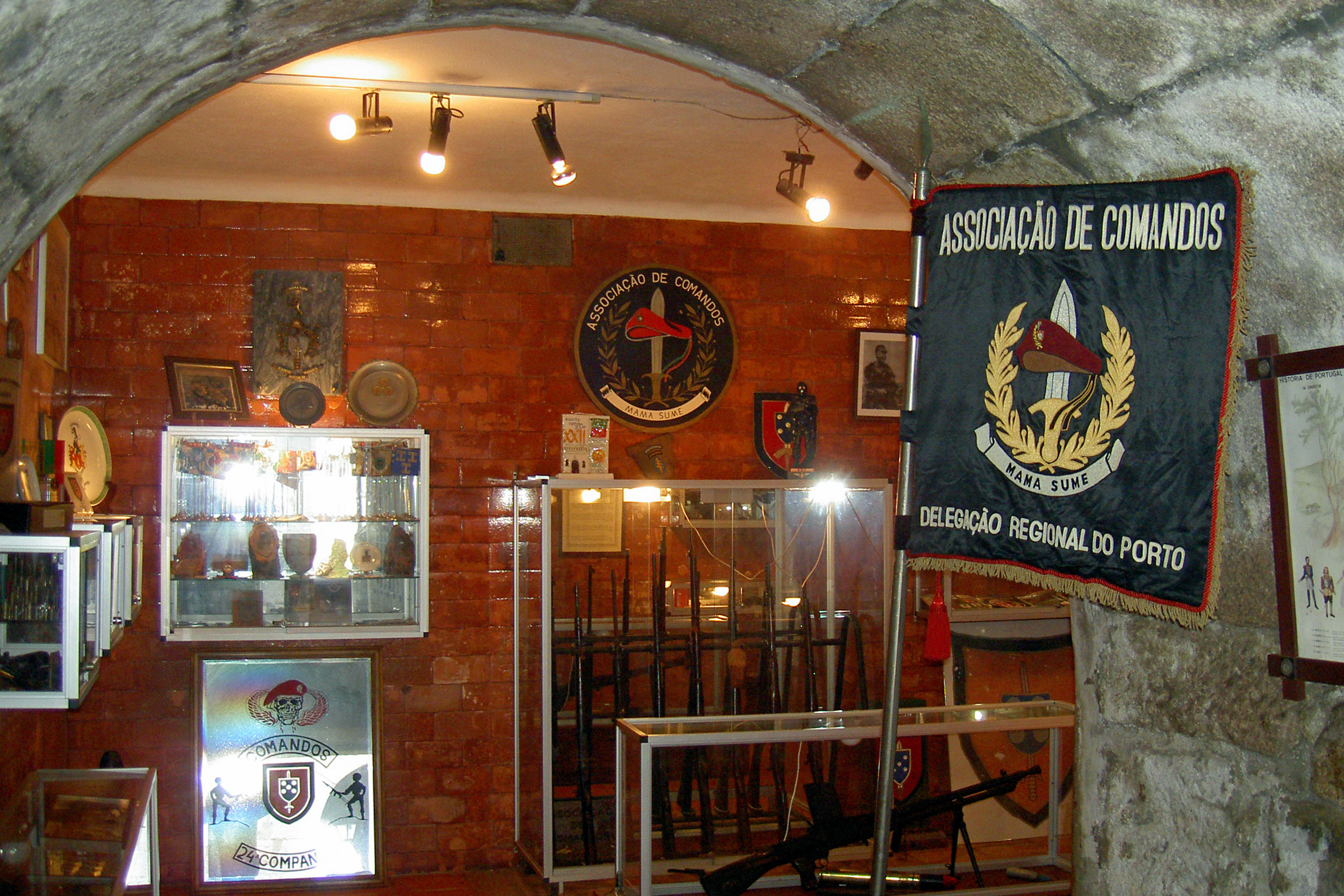
Inside the military museum located within the structure

The fort is situated on a dominant position over the ocean, a short distance from the mouth of the Douro and Leça Rivers. To the northeast is the city park connected directly to the sea.

The trapezoidal fortress is situated over a cliff, circled by a dry moat and areas that become inundated during high tide. The high walls are constructed with granite masonry in regular sloping rows, surmounted by a rounded frieze and topped by irregular battlements. Along the pentagonal facades are watchtowers resting on triangular corbels of stepped logs. The watchtowers are supported on cornices and formed into molded, round domes addorsed to the corners. The main facade (oriented towards the southeast) includes wall broken by main gate with rounded arch accessed by wooden drawbridge, over corbels. Over the portal, and interrupting the cornice, is the coat-of-arms of Portugal, surmounted by royal crown, under a granite sphere. Flanking the relief stone are vertical grooves reinforced by iron frame, from which hang the supporting chains of the drawbridge.

The drawbridge leads into a small tunnel sectioned into two spaces (preserving traces of doors), covered by barrel vault that includes three arrow slits on each side. On the left side of the tunnel entrance is a bronze plaque, with the inscription:

All did not return...with tears that do not see, with a cry that can not hear, here we are, in silent sense...with them, providing them our tribute...Command. 9 March 1985.

A rounded niche on the left, in granite masonry, shelters a representation in stone of the St. Francis Xavier, and to the right a similar niche houses an image of the Virgin Mary. The tunnel connects to the courtyard, covered with metal grids and glass plates, that provide access to bar, powder magazine covered in barrel vault, stairs, balconies and gateways to the remaining dependencies. From the lobby there is an access ramp to the upper deck.

An oratory, to the invocation of St. Francis Xavier was located within the hall of the former-residence of commander of the fort.
