= Cambeses =

Cambeses may refer to the following places in Portugal:

- Cambeses (Barcelos), a parish in the municipality of Barcelos
- Cambeses (Monção), a parish in the municipality of Monção
- Cambeses do Rio, a parish in the municipality of Montalegre
