= Siege of Monção =

Fernandine Wars

- Part of Fernandine Wars
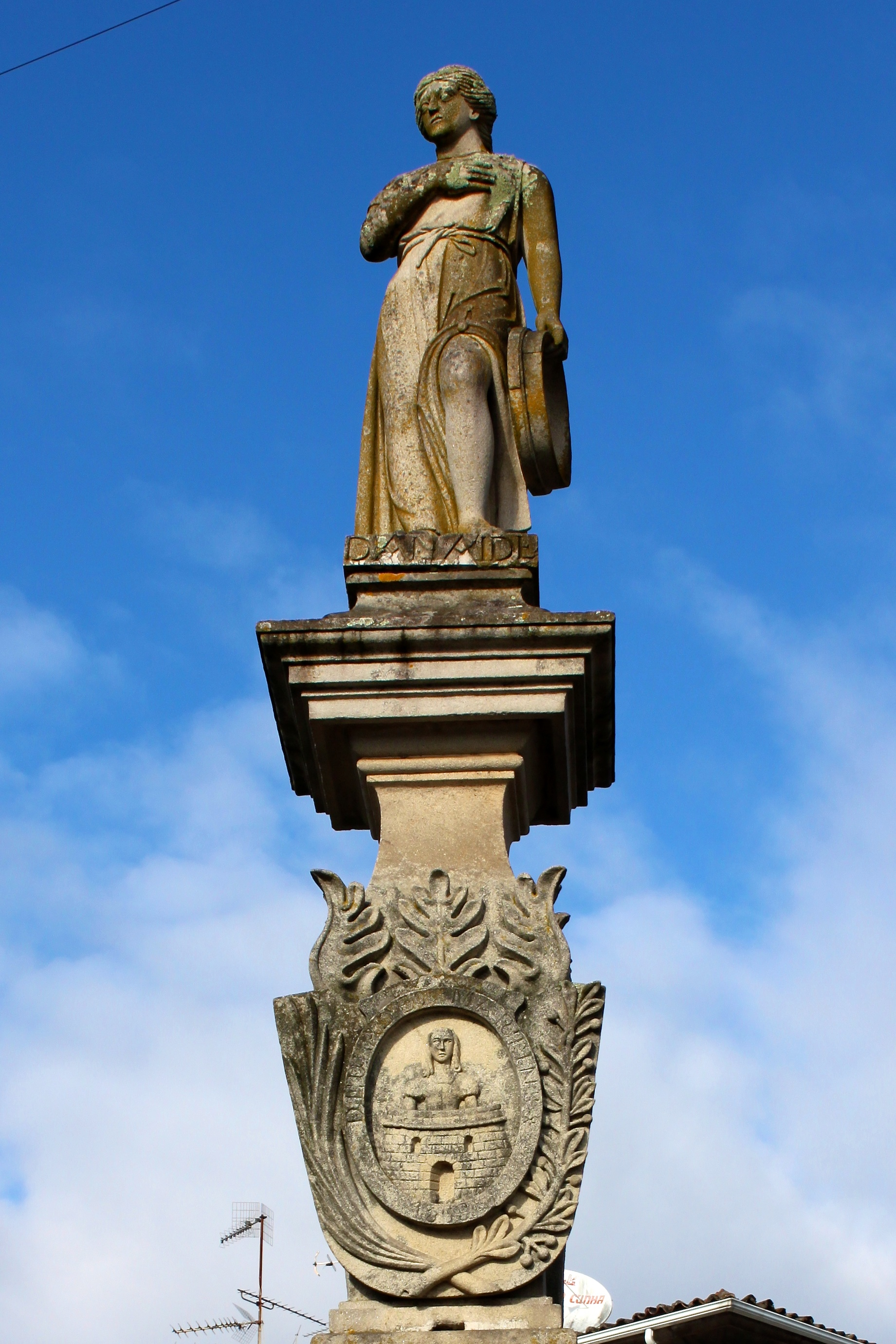
- Statue of Martins in Monção
Date	1369
Location	Monção, Portugal
Result	Portuguese victory

Belligerents
Kingdom of Portugal	Crown of Castile

Commanders and leaders
Vasco Gomes de Abreu; Deu-la-Deu Martins	Pedro Rodrigues Sarmento

Strength
Unknown	Unknown

Casualties and losses
Unknown	Unknown

The siege of Monção was a military confrontation between the Kingdom of Portugal and the Crown of Castile during the Fernandine Wars.

== Background ==
During the Fernandine Wars, the Kingdom of Portugal faced a series of military threats. Monção became a target for Castilian forces. Led by Pedro Rodrigues Sarmento, the Castilians laid siege to the town, intending to force its surrender through starvation rather than direct confrontation. The defenders, accompanied with Deu-la-Deu Martins, the wife of the town's captain-major, Vasco Gomes de Abreu, faced a decrease of supplies and an increasingly desperate situation.

== Siege ==
The siege dragged on, and food in Monção was decreasing. Deu-la-Deu Martins then took charge, using the remaining flour, she baked a small number of bread and ascended the town's walls. From there, she threw the bread toward the enemy shouting:

"To you, who, unable to conquer us by force of arms, have wanted to surrender us by hunger, we, more humane, and because, thanks be to God, we find ourselves well provided for, seeing that you are not satisfied, we send you this help, and we will give you more, if you ask for it."

This action made the Castilian forces believe that Monção was abundant in supplies, and, already tired, they lifted the siege.

== Aftermath ==
The retreat of the Castilian army saved Monção from falling into enemy hands.

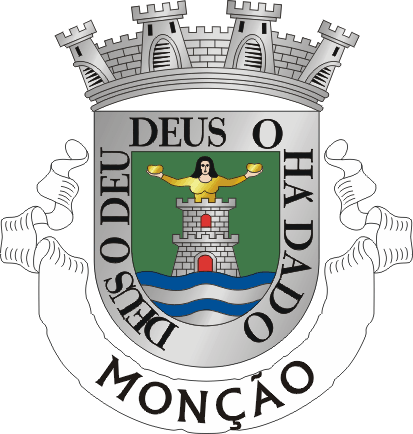
Coat of Arms of Monção

In Monção, an image of her appears on the town's coat of arms, which also has the phrase "God gave it, God has given it", apparently in acknowledgement of what Martins told the Castilians.
