= South American Institute of Government in Health =

Intergovernmental organization

South American Institute of Government in Health (ISAGS)
- Founded: July 25, 2011
- Type: Intergovernmental Organization
- Location: Rio de Janeiro, Brazil
- Origins: Part of the South American Council of Health of UNASUR
- Key people: José Gomes Temporão, Executive Director
- Website: www.isags-unasul.org

The South American Institute of Government in Health (ISAGS) is a public intergovernamental institution of UNASUR whose main goal is to promote exchange, critical thinking, knowledge management and generate innovation in policy and governance for health, thus offering South American Health Ministries the best available practices and evidences on health management. It was created by the Heads of State and Government of UNASUR after a proposal of the South American Council of Health gathered in Cuenca, Ecuador, in April 2010. According to the institute's Executive Director José Gomes Temporão, "Isags works in alliance with experts and networks present in the twelve countries of South America to foster the best practices in health to the 400 million inhabitants of this part of the world".

Created by UNASUR's Council of Heads of State and of Government as proposed by the South American Council of Health, gathered in Cuenca, Ecuador in April 2010, ISAGS operations are based on the Triennial Work Plan 2012–2015, which is itself a result of the priorities defined by the Quinquennial Plan 2010-2015 of the South American Council of Health.

ISAGS's three basic functions are managing and producing knowledge, developing leadership, and providing technical support. All three are carried out participatively, not only in what regards the identification of problems, but also in carrying out and sharing solutions.

Besides the South American Council of Health, other UNASUR councils have also proposed the creation of their own institutions to develop their activities, like the South American Defense Council. Its Defense Strategic Studies in Defense operates in Argentina's capital, Buenos Aires.

== Member countries ==
All of the 12 independent nations of South America are members of the South American Council of Health and, therefore, are part of ISAGS.

- Argentina
- Bolivia
- Brazil
- Chile
- Colombia
- Ecuador
- Guyana
- Paraguay
- Peru
- Suriname
- Uruguay
- Venezuela

== History ==
=== South American Health Council ===
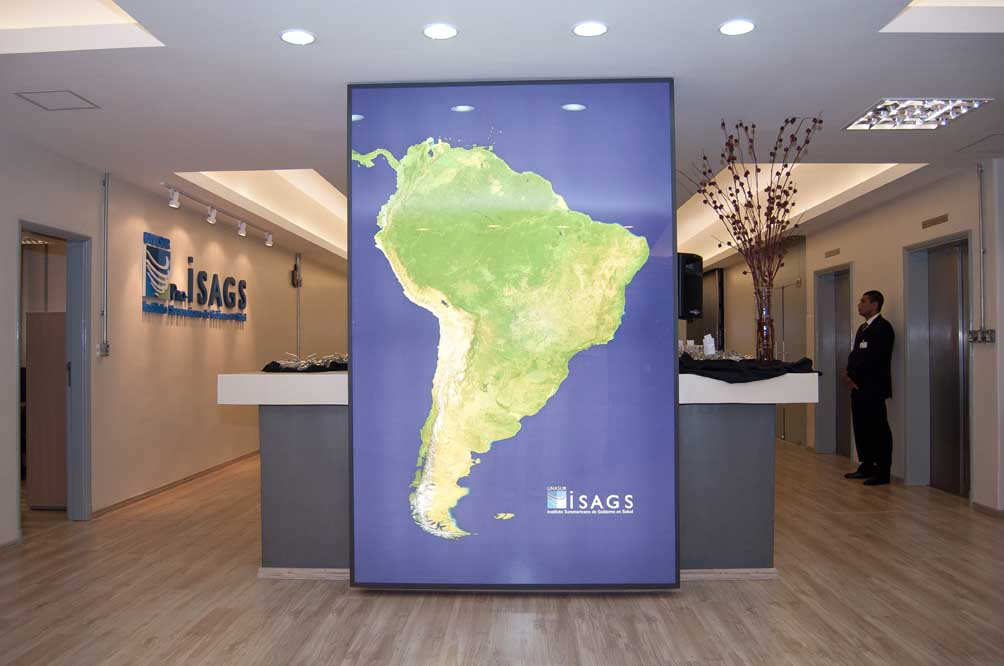
Institute's headquarter in Rio de Janeiro

The South American Council of Health (CSS), created on December 16, 2008, also known as Unasur-Health, is a permanent council composed of Ministers from member countries of UNASUR. This body was created in order to constitute a space of integration concerning health, incorporating the efforts and improvements from other mechanisms of regional integration, such as MERCOSUR, Organismo Andino de Salud (ORAS-CONHU)and ACTO, to promote common policies and coordinated activities among member countries. It is also a consultation and consensus body concerning health, which intends to delve deeply into relevant themes and strengthen public policies aimed at improving the living conditions of the inhabitants of the South American continent.

The council aims to strengthen, in the constitution of a South American political institution with expertise in sanitary issues, the development of solutions to challenges that go beyond national borders, developing values and mutual interests among the neighboring countries, thus facilitating the interaction of health authorities of the Member States through the sharing of knowledge and technology in the region.

The Quinquennial Plan puts forward five axes so as to contribute to the South American integration:

1. Health Surveillance and Response,
2. Development of Universal Health Systems,
3. Health Promotion and Action on Social Determinants,
4. Universal Access to Medicine,
5. Development of Human Resources Management.

Beyond that, political coordination is established in the South American Health Council in topics such as common positions in international fora. The WHO Reform is one example.

In November 2009, through Resolution 05/2009, the South American Council of Health decided to create ISAGS. Rio de Janeiro would have its Headquarters. The Human Resources Technical Group was in charge of elaborating of the institute's project.

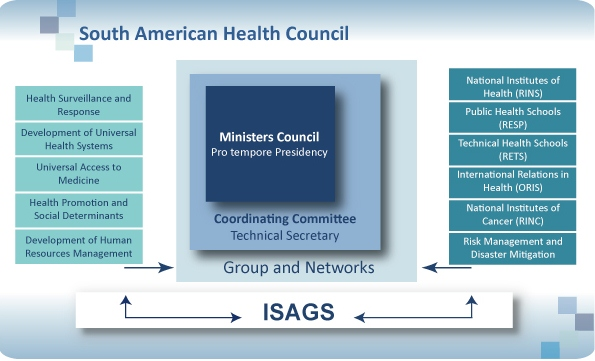
South American Health Council's Structure

According to Paulo Buss, who envioned the institute, it was created to "be the a space for permanent analysis of the impact of health policies, including the efficiency of implemented attention models (...) it establish a dialog with other experiences accumulated by other regional centres (like ILPES, CELADE and others) and it should interact with public health and related fields postgrad schools.

ISAGS was opened on 25 July 2011 with the presence of the then UNASUR General Secretary María Emma Mejía, the then Pro-Tempore President of the South American Health Council Jorge Venegas, of the Brazilian Minister of Health Alexandre Padilha, of the former Brazilian Minister of Foreign Relations Celso Amorim and Health Ministries representants of Bolivia, Brazil, Chile, Colombia, Ecuador, Guyana, Paraguay, Peru, Suriname, Uruguay e Venezuela.

=== Achievements ===
Since its creation, ISAGS has organized 6 workshops and supported meetings that resulted in publications and political coordinations in international fora.

The workshops were:

- Health Systems in South America
- Communication in Health
- Sanitary Surveillance Systems in South America
- Health Surveillance
- Global Health and Health Diplomacy
- Governance in Health, Environment and Sustainable Development in an Intersectorial Context

The workshops are broadcast live through the Internet in Portuguese, Spanish and English. Then, they are converted into open videoclasses.

== Basic functions ==
=== Management and production of knowledge ===
Organize and produce knowledge on public health and governance of the health sector, taking in only established results and carrying out researches, generating innovation in health policies and health governance to produce new evidences. Systematize, organize and disseminate technical and scientific information on regional and global health, with the overarching goal of providing support to the process of decision-making.

=== Develop leadership in management ===
Respond to needs regarding the training of leaders to manage health systems, services, organizations and programs. Organize workshops between managers and specialists, where actual experiences of innovations in management are shared.

=== Technical support ===
Provide technical support to national health systems and institutions using new methodologies that promote knowledge transfer and facilitate the formulation of new policies for managing health institutions and systems of the member countries. Develop models to evaluate not only the products, but also the causes and effects of cooperation. Support the development of external policies to be shared by UNASUR members.

== Administrative structure ==
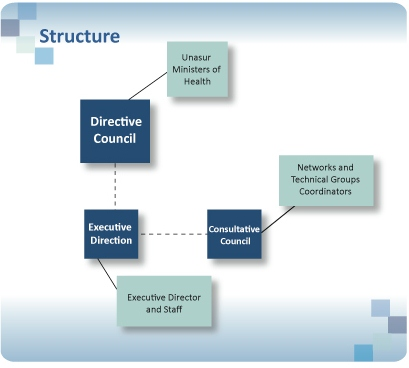
ISAGS' Structure

ISAGS is a public intergovernmental entity that is part of the UNASUR's South American Health Council. It is formed by the executive board and the Directive and Consultative Councils.

The executive board is responsible for administering ISAGS according to the goals, functions, policies, plans, programs and projects established and approved by the Directive Council.

The Directive Council is one of ISAGS's permanent units and carries out directive functions, guided by the priorities established at the South American Health Council. It is formed by delegates assigned by the Health Ministers of member countries and is responsible for defining institutional policies.

The Consultative Council, responsible for producing recommendations regarding the planning, management, implementation and evaluation of ISAGS's programs, is formed by:

- Senior Coordinators of UNASUR-Salud's technical groups;
- Coordinators of UNASUR's Networks of Structuring Institutions;
- Specialists in critical areas of knowledge in health
