= Castle of Monção =

Castle in Viana do Castelo District, Portugal

Coordinates: 42.078°N 8.481°W

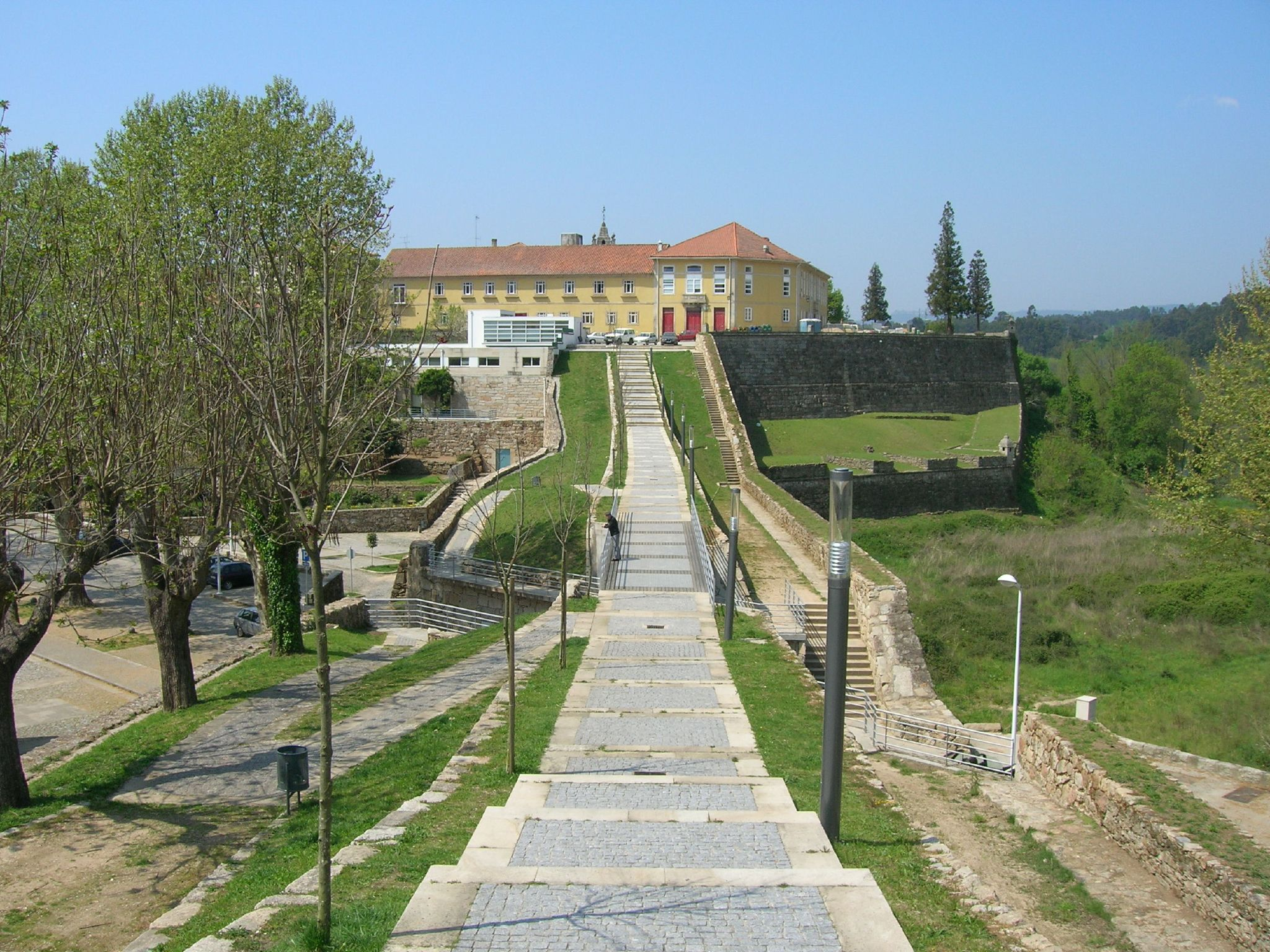
Castle of Monção

The Castle of Monção (Portuguese: Castelo de Monção) is a medieval castle in the civil parish of Monção e Troviscoso, municipality of Monção, the Portuguese district of Viana do Castelo.

It is classified as a National Monument.
