= Longos Vales's Monastery =

Monastery in Monção, Portugal

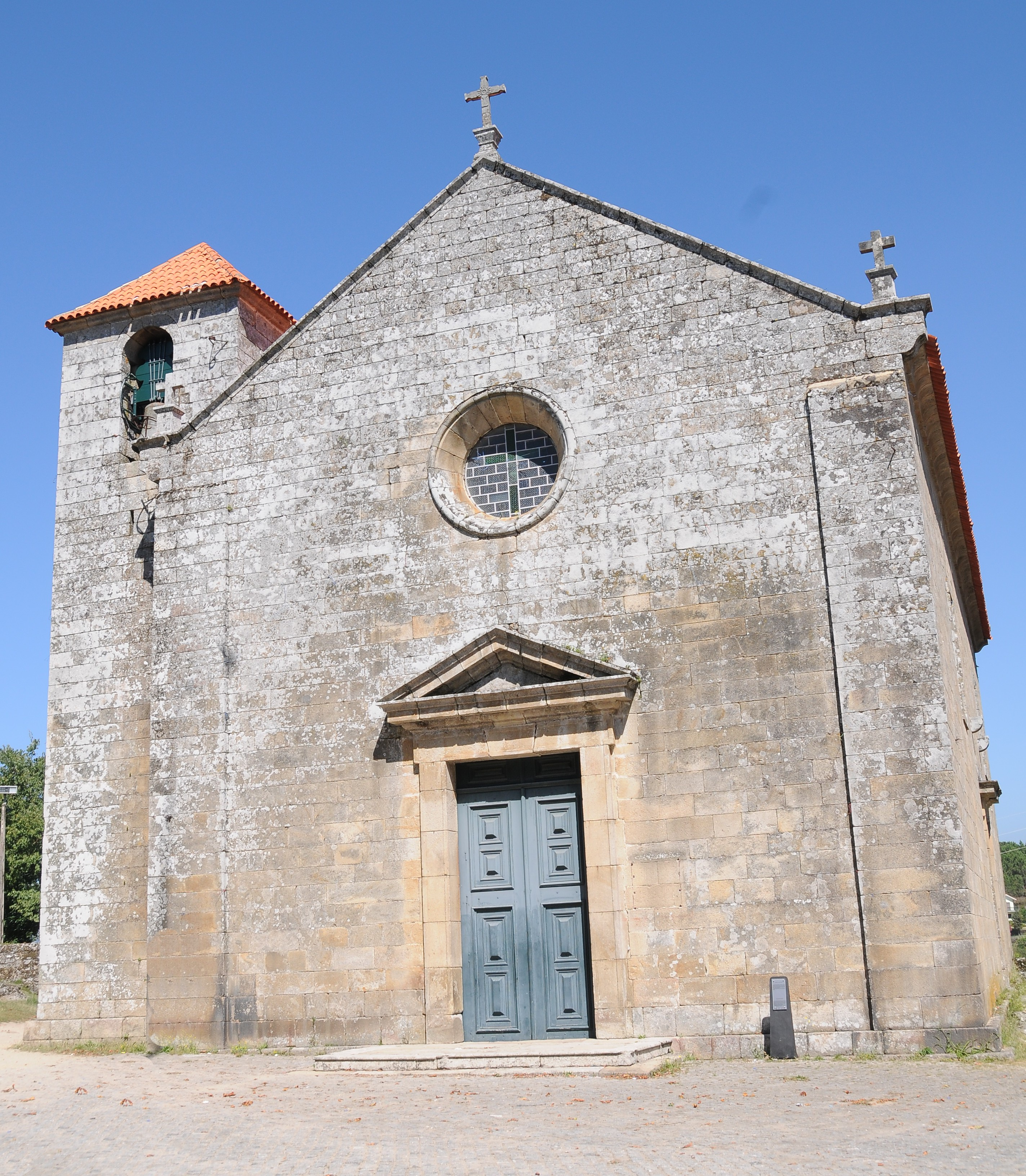

Religion
- Affiliation: Roman Catholic
- Ecclesiastical or organisational status: Church

Location
- Location: Monção, Portugal
- Interactive map of Longos Vales's Monastery
- Coordinates: 42°03′04.03″N 8°26′40.29″W

Architecture
- Type: Church
- Materials: Granite

The Longos Vales's Monastery (Portuguese: Mosteiro de Longos Vales) is a monastery in Longos Vales, Monção, Portugal.

== History ==
The foundation of the monastery is attributed to D. Afonso Henriques in the second half of the 12th century.

The only enduring element of the primitive medieval construction with its clearly Romanesque style is the main chapel, the remainder of the group was subjected to remodelling work when it passed into the hands of the Society of Jesus.

Nowadays, the monastery is private property, with the exception of the church which continues to be part of the parochial headquarters of the parish.

It is classified by IPPAR as a National Monument since 1926.

== See also ==
- National Monuments of Portugal
- Churches in Portugal
