= Church of the Misericórdia de Valadares =

Church of the Misericórdia
- Church of Mercy/Charity of Valadares
- Igreja da Misericórdia
- Church of the Misericórdia
- 42°4′25.66″N 8°21′49.06″W
- Location: Viana do Castelo, Alto Minho, Norte
- Country: Portugal

Architecture
- Architect: Domingos Gonçalves
- Style: Baroque, Neoclassicism

Specifications
- Length: 31.45 m (103.2 ft)
- Width: 17.60 m (57.7 ft)

The Church of the Miserícordia de Valadares (Portuguese: Igreja da Misericórdia de Valadares), or Church of Mercy/Charity of Valadares, is a 17th–18th-century Portuguese church located in the civil parish of Valadares, municipality of Monção in continental Portugal. The church was classified as Property of Public Interest in 1961.

== History ==
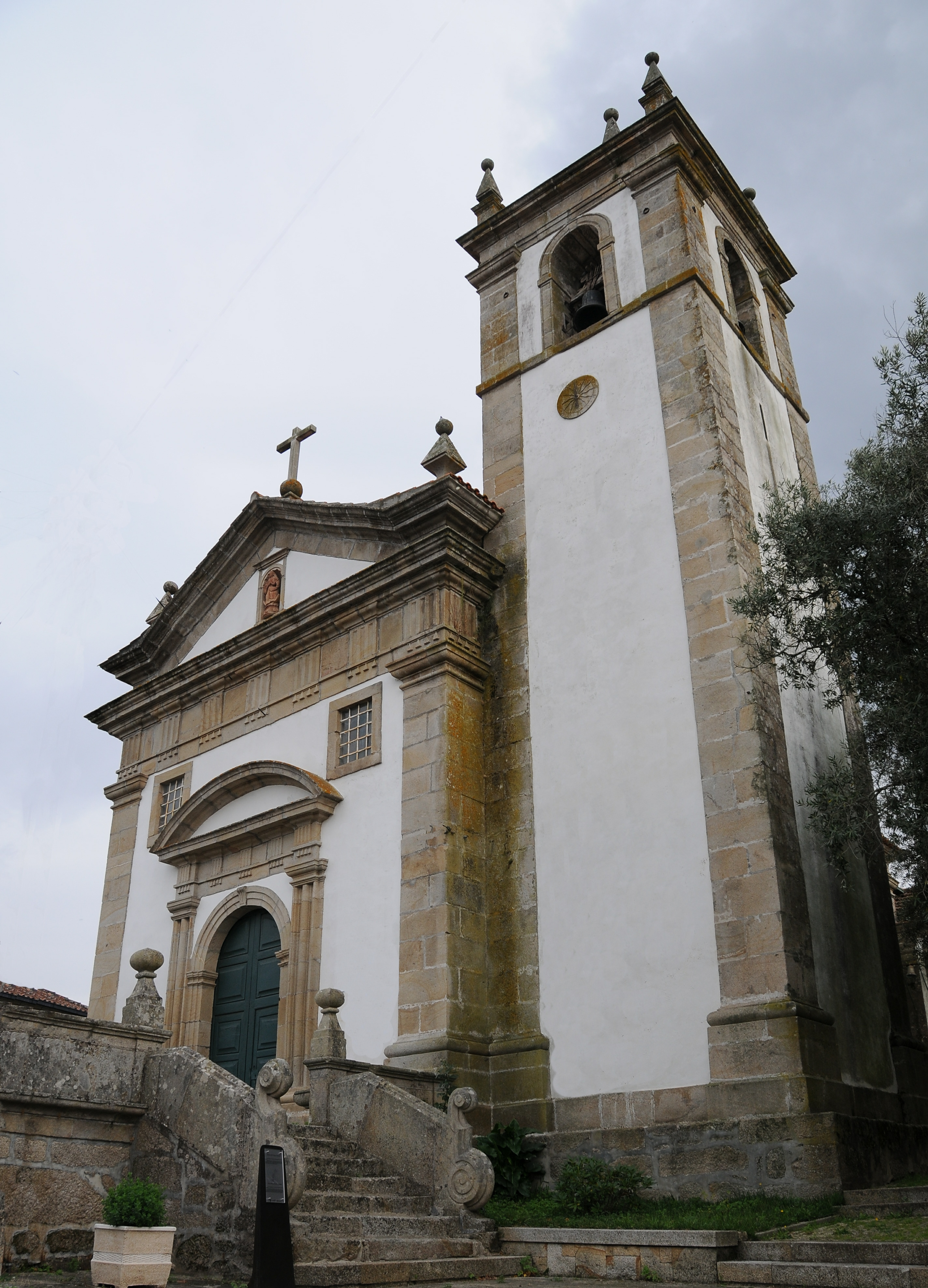
The front façade of the Baroque-Neoclassical church of Valadares

Originally, the need to establish a presence in the village of Valadares was developed in 1535, when the religious brotherhood approached King Philip I of Portugal to solicit its creation. But, it was only in 1687 that the project to build a church was contemplated: the design was issued to master Domingos Gonçalves at a cost of 3$500 réis. Those that wanted to join the brotherhood of the Misericórdia of Valadares was required to pay a tribute: in the first half of the 18th century membership dues were between $300 and $480 réis, depending on their station and level of participation. The primary administrative body of this group (the Portuguese: Mesa) was different then most Misericórdias at the time: it included a provedor, secretary, prosecutor (all men of high status), a treasurer and twelve brothers (the remaining of lower status). There were also four councillors from the wealthy gentry that formed the junta. In total 16 elements, that met several times throughout the year, when it was necessary but not on fixed intervals. (occasionally, the entire quorum would meet also as the Mesa grande). Members of the inner quorum included the clergy of the neighbouring parishes and a few military officers, while it is likely that the powerful, wealthy nobles of Monção and Melgaço were integrated into this group.

The charitable organization decided to construct a new house in Valadares in 1688. Stonemason Francisco Gonçalves (of the parish of Ceivães) and his assistant Francisco da Costa solicited the Misericórdia for funds to complete the project, at one time addressing their treasurer André Gomes to transfer the 148$000 réis from the organization's coffers. In 1689, the Misericórdia purchased a house from Manuel Monteiro, that existed alongside the old Misericórdia building for 57$700, in order to build the new building. This project proceeded during the mid 18th century, and involved a string of masons, painters, sculptures and masters. By 1736, already complete, there was a decision to complete renovations of the main chancel and two lateral chapels, with a promise of 30$000 réis from brother Domingos Domingues Ramos.

At this time (1738) the Misericórdia had eleven clergy providing services, such as the legate of the Deão da Baía, who issued an order that the Misericórdia, among other obligations, should celebrate 500 masses for the souls in purgatory (around 1741). In the same year a new project was begun by the painter Luís Peixoto (from Arcos de Valdevez) for 386$500, but having insufficient funds, the brotherhood contracted a loan for 300$000 réis to pay the difference. A tender for the lateral altars was completed in favour of António Gandra for 81$000 réis in 1748. In the same period, the brothers decided to open an exterior door and window. But, this project created tensions with Captain-General João Manuel de Araújo Azevedo e Andrade who stopped the project, alleging that he had territorial rights of access from his residence through the locality. In order to end the conflict, the monks decided to provide the General a key to the church, in order that he may have access, at his leisure, to the "divine offices" of the Misericórdia. Shortly thereafter, a new administrative body rescinded this privilege and confiscated the key, owing to issues of security.

In 1749, the exterior, including the courtyard and benches were remodelled by master mason João do Cano, for 68$500 réis, a price that he reduced three times; the cost of the project diminished so greatly, that by the end of the commission, the mason petitioned the administrative council to raise his stipend, in order to cover his personal costs. The brotherhood, owing to their satisfaction, obliged the artisan, since they felt the project was well conceived and executed, but subtracted a promised eight alqueires of corn (which was also promised at the time). The ombudsman of the Confraria das Almas, solicited the participation of the brothers of the Misericórdia in order to realize a remodelling of their altar, since there was exposed wood and damage, and since they alone did not have the capacity to pay the costs of such a project on their own. The group already had a guarantee from the Confraria de São Pedro for this project, but request 30$000 réis for gold-leafing and work on the retable (the Misericórdia offered 20$000).

The residents of the town petitioned the Misericórdia administration to install an image of the Cristo Crucificado (Crucified Christ) in the chancelin 1750. The brothers consented as long as the completed work remained with the Misericórdia. The parishioners were authorized to realize religious ceremonies at the altar, including festivals, as long as they did not coincide with those of the Misericórdia. It was father Manuel de Sousa, in the name of the parishioners, that solicited this authorization, guaranteeing all costs would be paid by the devotees, which was accepted by the council, as long as they "did not affect the benefits of the Santa Casa" and that the altar was built below the arch.

Conflict between the municipal government followed. In September 1752, the confreres derided the council while demanding that they show them their books. This was done because there existed an accord to split the funds paid by vendors who used the churchyard, and there existed some skepticism on the part of the brotherhood as to their rights and remuneration. The brothers counselled reform of the accord between the partners, but petitioned the king to "give each man his right". The following year the vendors, who occupied the spaces of the brotherhood, used the church tower to tie down their tents and used the church pews for their own use, which created tensions. These vendors eventually armed their tents some distance from the church, and solicited the brotherhood for space in front of the Misericórdia Velha in order to establish their tents. The confreres consented to the rental, but determined that no part of the churchyard would be occupied again.

In 1764, the confreres petitioned royal authority to build a tomb, which was a typical of the period, since the space had no place to bury their dead. The tomb was located the eastern corner of the church and Misericórdia Velha.

While, by 1765, it was able to take in 324$861 réis in receipts, while expending 302$000 réis (a meager profit), by 1804 the situation had turned grave. The brotherhood of the Misericórdia sent a letter to the Crown, informing it of "grave financial situation" that existed in the Santa Casa, referring to corruption of the previous board. In their communique, the former brotherhood of not paying the expenses; of taking monies belonging to the Santa Casa; of embezzling moneys destined to it from a benefactor (José de Araújo Pereira, who had died in Rio de Janeiro in 1787, leaving behind 4000 cruzados); and of pocketing accumulated interest from these receipts. Upon receiving these charges, the Prince Regent ordered an inspection of the state of the finances of Santa Casa, sending in an administrator/auditor from the comarca of Viana do Castelo. It was only in 1807 when the review was officially begun into the accounts of the Misericórdia. The 1787 auditor, Bento Manuel Machado de Araújo, explained that he had taken 1200$000 from the benefactor, but had made all the necessary provisions. Regardless, the analysis by auditors between 1774 and 1804 revealed a debit of 1789$869 réis, but that the Misericórdia had not received 11553$949 in outstanding payments. This analysis only helped to confirm the decision of the Administrator General of the district of Viana do Castelo in 1838: a majority of the Misericórdias were badly administrated, resulting in the loss of funds, that was treated by their administration with little zeal. In 1839, the same administrator sent a financial commissioner to reform the bureaucracy, examine the errors and clean up the sloppiness in the Misericórdia of Valadares.

In 1848, a tender was issued to many of the masons for the remodelling of the exterior walls of the church.

In 1855, the municipality of Valadares was extinguished.

By the last quarter of the 19th century, the church continued to be remodelled in some form, which included the construction of the valance of the triumphal arch and the lateral retables of the chancel were constructed.

On 3 August 1931, the administrative table of the Misericórdia begins to be managed by an administrative commission. But, by 28 February 1955, this group realized its last session.

== Architecture ==
The church is located in the centre of the town of Valadares, in a space that was used traditionally for fairs, and whose vendors paid a fee to occupy space. It is found in an elevated churchyard, encircled by a wall and bunkets of rock, with the access made by a lateral staircase and railing crowned by pinnacles topped with spheres.

The church plan is composed of a rectangular nave and chancel, bell-tower and sacristy, as well as polygonal annex: each articulated space is topped by tiled roof. Although the facades are plastered and whitewashed, the foundations, doorways and windows are projected cornices, with wedge pilasters on the corners, while the building is surmounted by pinnacles and crosses on most gables.

The principal facade, with vibrant entablature and metopes, is overlaid by a triangular pediment, with the tympanum hosting an image of Nossa Senhora da Misericórdia (OurLady of Mercy). An arched portal-arched, based on Tuscan capitals, is framed by a space defined by Tuscan pilasters, supporting a curved pediment over a metope entablature. On either side of this symmetrical facade are two rectangular windows. The four-storey bell-tower that includes: a stone clock, four-exposure belfry, a stone face with cornices and a cupola with four corner and one central pinnacles. The north façade has two rectangular windows at the nave and chancel, while two windows and door on the southern façade.

The frontispiece follows the model of the Church of São Vitor (Braga), although simplified, that introduces some modifications, such as the arch on the portico. It has several structural affinities with the front facade and interior of the Church of the Misericórdia in Monção. Much like in the churches of Monção and Ponte de Lima, this church has squared-off vaulted ceilings over cornices that are supported by corbels, and lateral niches with Neoclassical gilded retables, hiding much of its structure. The coat-of-arms of the Santa Casa da Misericórdia are located on the roof of the sub-choir, choir stalls and the confessionaries in the chancel. Paintings on the roof of the nave, are also similar to those in Monção, although the content here is richer, while figures are treated more naively. The figures on the ceiling of the chancel are treated much better than in the nave, and the themes were influenced by the treasties of friar Luis de Melgaço, reconciling many biblical examples of the priests of the Catholic and Orthodox churches, the virtues and saints. Along with the Misericórdia of Melgaço, the church of Valadares was the only district without a hospital in the 19th century: there are no documents that suggested that the Misericórdia was used for this role, as was typical of the period.

=== Interior ===
The interior is plastered and whitewashed. A choir is located on arched corbels with wooden balustrades accessible from a door to the right. Meanwhile the sub-choir with wooden awnings, is accessible from the right arm of the Santa Casa da Misericórdia alongside a baptismal fountain.

On the opposite wall there is a door flanked by soupe, with a rectangular pulpit on a stone corbel, surrounded by a wooden balustrade. At the front of the nave, there are two retables with gilded carvings, protected by iron railings, that shelter the image of the Sacred Heart of Jesus (pulpit side) and Our Lady of Fátima (epistle-side), both flanked by pews.

The floors are in wood, while the angular roof, is divided into square boxes, painted along the centre with the images from the life of the Virgin, while along the two lateral rows show scenes from the life of Christ. On the extreme ends of the nave are symbols representing the martyrdom of Christ, while a triumphal arch, filled with a gilt valance. The main chapel has two closets and two lateral niches, framed in stone and trimmed with curved pediment, with carved and gilded retables.

The main altar, carved and gilded, with a tabernacle surrounded by angels, includes a throne with the Holy Eucharist. The paved floor and curved roof are in wood, with a projected cornice and wood panels painted with images from the bible's Old Testament, the fathers of the Eastern Orthodox and the Catholic Church, the three cardinal virtues, saints Peter and Paul (the two pillars of the Catholic Church) and a scene from the Adoration of the Magi.

With the squared-off vaulted ceiling from the high-choir to the triumphal arch are scenes from the life the Virgin Mary: "São Joaquim, Santa Ana e a Virgem" (Saint Joachim, Saint Anne and the Virgin); "Santa Ana ensina a Virgem a ler" (Saint Anne teaches the Virgin to read); "Anunciação" (The Annunciation); "Visitação" (The Visitation); "Fuga para o Egipto" (Flight into Egypt); "Mater Omnium"; "Esponsais da Virgem" (The Betrothal of the Virgin); "Assunção da Virgem" (The Assumption of the Virgin); "Coroação da Virgem" (The Heart of the Virgin); and "Cristo Redentor" (Christ the Redeemer). In the two lateral tiers there are images from the life of Christ. On the right lateral tier, from the choir to arch: "São Lucas"; "São João Evangelista"; "Anjo com coluna" (Angel with Column); "Última Ceia" (The Last Supper); "Cristo no horto" (Christ in the Garden of Gethsemane); "beijo de Judas" (Judas' Kiss); "Cristo perante Pilatos" (Christ before Pilate); "Cristo atado à coluna" (Christ bound to a column); "colocação da coroa de espinhos" (Placing the crown of thorns); and "Ecce Homo". In counterpoint, on the left lateral tier: "Cristo inicia o caminho do Calvário" (Christ begins his road to Calvary); "Simão de Cirene carregando a cruz" (Simon of Cyrene carrying the cross); "Jesus falando às mulheres de Jerusalém" (Jesus talking to the women of Jerusalem); "Crucificação" (The Crucifixion); "exalçamento da cruz" (The Exclamation of the Cross); "Calvário" (Calvary); "Descida da cruz" (Descent from the Cross); "anjo com cruz" (Angel with Cross); "São Marcos"; and "São Mateus". On the extreme ends of the roof are figures of angels, with symbols of the martyrdom of Christ: carnations, crown of thorns, scourge, dice, sword, candle, shroud, hand, lance, torch, crop, chalice, rooster, a pouch with 30 pieces of coin and a flag with the inscription S.P.Q.R.
