= South American Council of Health =

- Founded: December 16, 2008
- Type: Intergovernmental Organization
- Location: Lima, Peru
- Origins: formed in Rio de Janeiro, as part of UNASUR
- Region served: South America
- Key people: Midori de Habich, President Pro Tempore
- Website: www.minsa.gob.pe/unasur/index

The South American Council of Health, created on December 10, 2008, is a permanent council composed of Ministers from member countries of Unasur (Union of South American Nations). This body was created in order to constitute a space of integration concerning health, incorporating the efforts and improvements from other mechanisms of regional integration, such as MERCOSUR, Organismo Andino de Salud (ORAS CONHU) and Amazon Cooperation Treaty Organization, to promote common policies and coordinated activities among member countries. It is also a consultation and consensus body concerning health, which intends to delve deeply into relevant themes and strengthen public policies aimed at improving the living conditions of the inhabitants of the South American continent.

In July 2011, the Council established its South American Institute of Government in Health, aimed to be a think-tank to promote exchange, critical thinking, knowledge management and generate innovation in policy and governance for health, thus offering South American Health Ministries the best available practices and evidences on health management.

== Objectives ==
- strengthen, in the constitution of a South American political institution with expertise in sanitary issues
- development of solutions to challenges that go beyond national borders, developing values and mutual interests among the neighboring countries
- facilitating the interaction of health authorities of the Member States through the sharing of knowledge and technology in the region.

== Structure ==
The Council is composed by the Health Ministries of Unasur’s Member States. In order to achieve the Council’s goals, the Coordinating Committee - responsible for preparing propositions of Agreements and Resolutions - was created. It is formed by the representatives and deputies of each Member State and a representative of the MERCOSUR, Organismo Andino de Salud (ORAS CONHU), Amazon Cooperation Treaty Organization and PAHO in the capacity of observers and transiently. The Council's Presidency is held by the Health Minister of the country nominated for the Pro Tempore Presidency (PPT) of UNASUR. It is in charge of coordinating the activities of all councils and managing the Technical Secretary. The Pro Tempore President has a two-year term that may be extended for another two years, being unconditionally succeeded by a president from a different country. The CSS is underpinned by the Technical Secretary in charge of the Pro Tempore Presidency (PPT) and two countries of the previous and following PPT, in order to ensure the continuity of works. There are also the Technical Groups responsible for analyzing, preparing and developing proposals, plans and projects that contribute to the South American integration in health, according to the alignment established by the South American Health Agenda. The Technical Groups are divided into areas of work defined by the South American Health Council, with one country in charge of the coordination and another country as the deputy coordinator. In addition to the Technical Groups, the Council also has preexisting and developing Structuring Networks that aim to spread knowledge in the field of health.
