= Deu-la-Deu Martins =

Legendary Portuguese woman

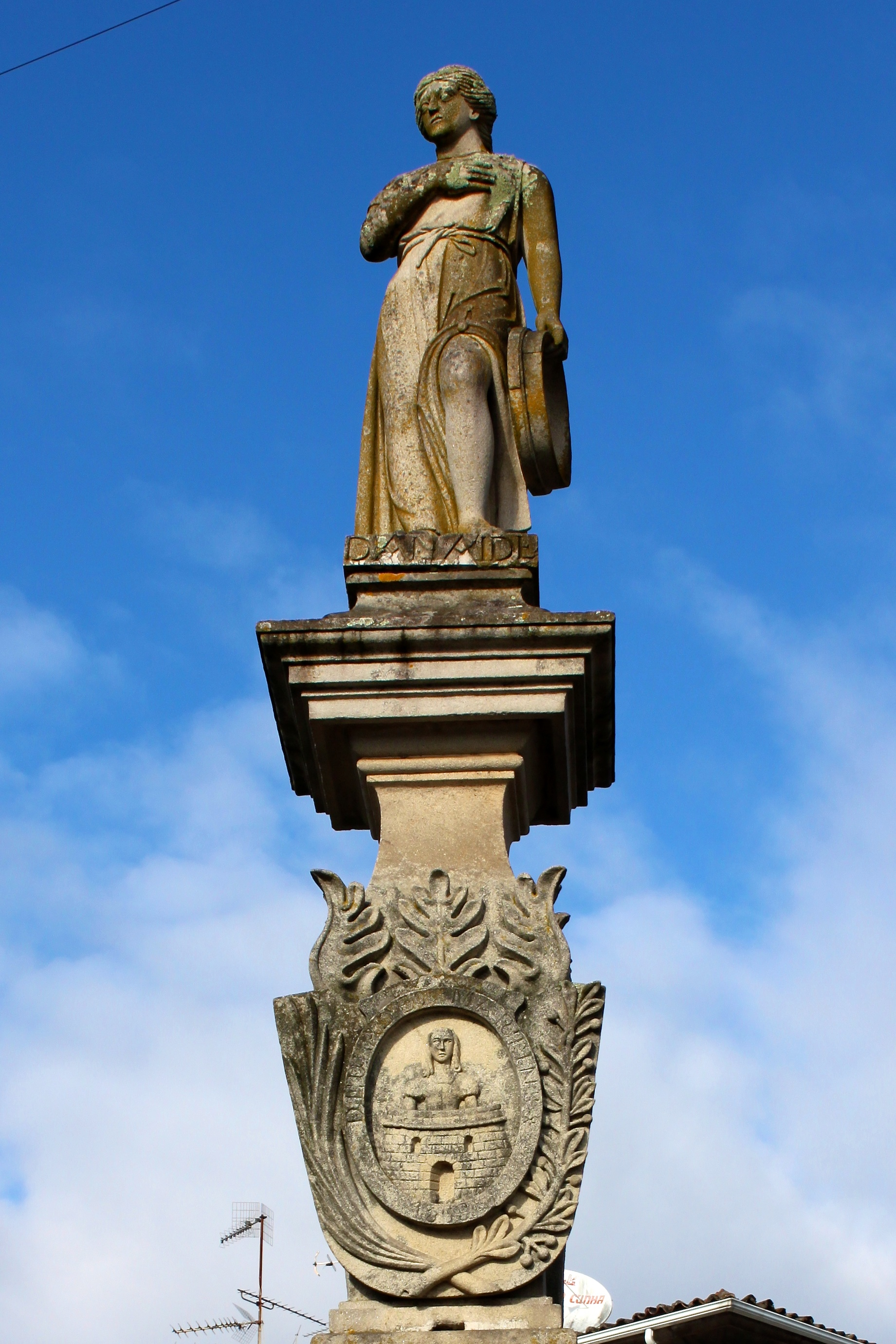
Statue of Martins in Monção

Deu-la-Deu Martins is a legendary character from the northern Portuguese town of Monção, known for having deceived the Castilian army during the Fernandine Wars in the 14th century, thereby saving the people of Monção.

== The legend ==
Martins was the wife of Vasco Gomes de Abreu, who was the Captain-General of Monção during the Fernandine Wars between the Kingdom of Portugal under King Ferdinand I and the Crown of Castile under Kings Henry II and, later, John I. The Fernandine Wars were fought over Ferdinand's claim to the Castilian succession after the murder of King Peter of Castile in 1369.

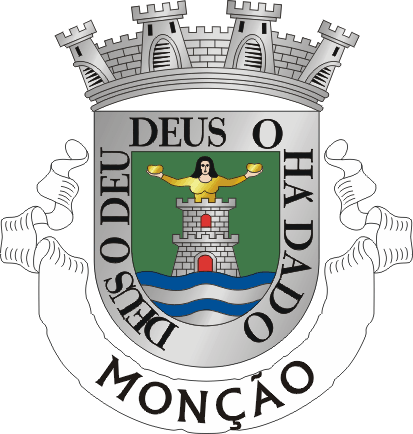
Coat of Arms of Monção

Monção is situated to the immediate south of the Minho river with Castile in Spain north of the river. The town came under siege from the Castilians and food became scarce within its walls. According to the legend, Martins ordered that the little remaining flour should be collected and used to make loaves of bread. Knowing that the Castilians were also running out of bread, she then climbed the wall with the loaves and threw them to the Castilian soldiers, shouting: "For you, who could not conquer us by force of arms and wanted us to surrender through hunger. Thank God, we are well provided for and seeing that you are hungry, we send you this help and we will give you more, if you ask!" Believing that there was still considerable resistance within the walls, and being themselves very hungry, the Castilians are said to have lifted the siege and returned home.

== Present-day recognition ==
The story is just a legend. In Monção, an image of her appears on the town's coat of arms, which also has the phrase "God gave it, God has given it", apparently in acknowledgement of what Martins told the Castilians. There is a statue in Largo do Loreto in Monção that shows her distributing the bread. A square in the town also bears her name and there is a chapel in her memory in a local church. Her name is also used for a local wine.
