= José Gomes Temporão =

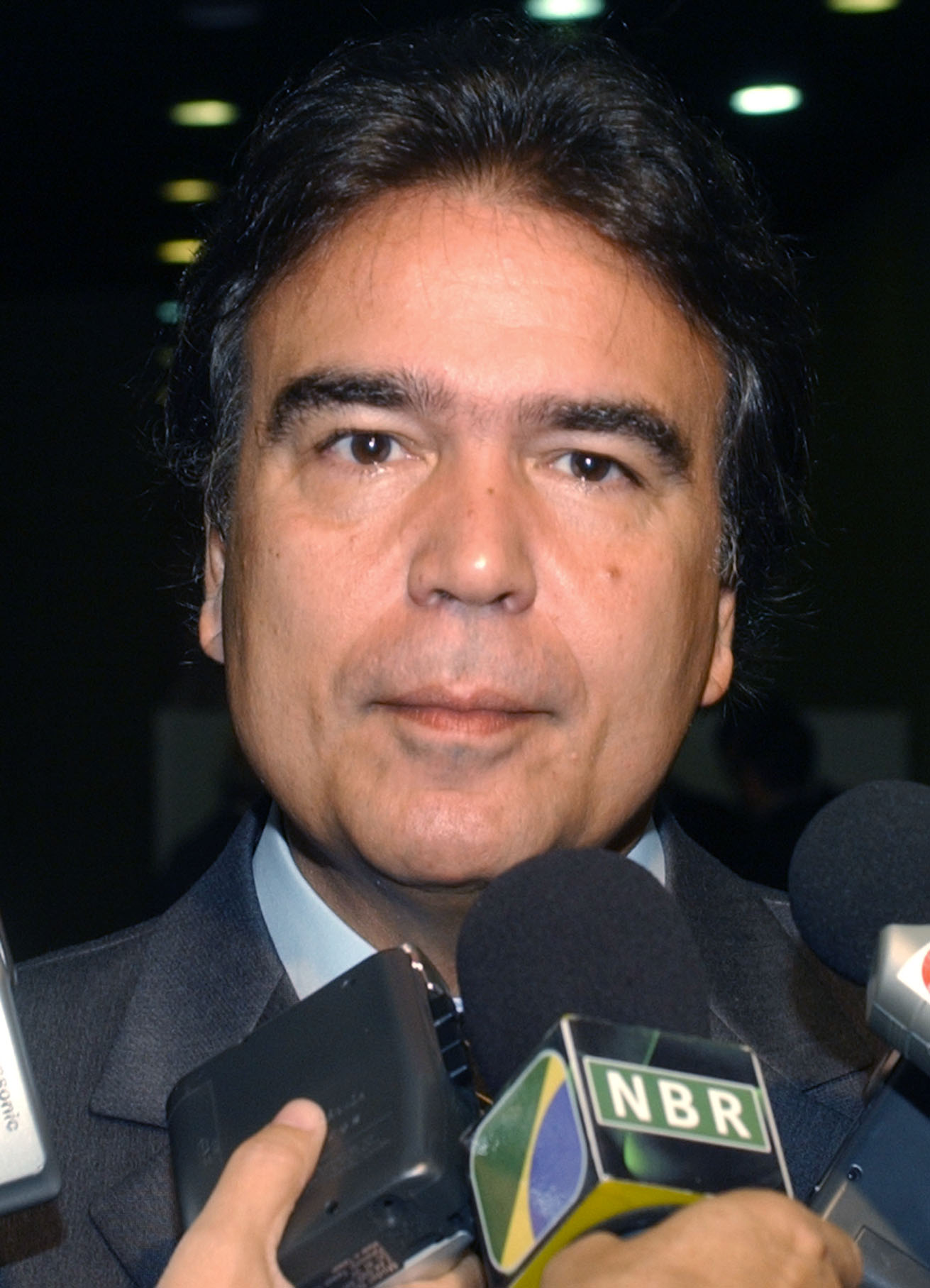

41st Minister of Health of Brazil
- In office 16 March 2007 – 31 December 2010
- President: Luiz Inácio Lula da Silva
- Preceded by: Agenor Álvares
- Succeeded by: Alexandre Padilha

Personal details
- Born: 20 October 1951 (age 74) Merufe, Monção, Portugal
- Party: Brazilian Socialist Party
- Education: Federal University of Rio de Janeiro, Rio de Janeiro State University, Oswaldo Cruz Foundation
- Occupation: Doctor

José Gomes Temporão (born 20 October 1951) is a Brazilian public health physician and politician, formerly of the Brazilian Democratic Movement Party, who later joined the Brazilian Socialist Party. He was Brazilian Minister of Health from 2007 to 2010, during the second term of President Luiz Inácio Lula da Silva's administration.

== Biography ==
José Gomes Temporão was born in the freguesia of Merufe, in the town of Monção, on the north of Portugal, on October 20, 1951. His parents, Sara Gomes and José Temporão, emigrated to Brazil when he was just one month old, settling in Rio de Janeiro. His father is the owner of 'Mosteiro', one of the most well-reputed restaurants in downtown Rio.

Temporão graduated on the Federal University of Rio de Janeiro Medical School on 1977. He became a researcher in tropical diseases on that same university and became a master in public health at the Oswaldo Cruz Foundation - FIOCRUZ. He later also got a PhD in Social Medicine on the Rio de Janeiro State University.

From March 1991 to April 1992, he was Sub-Secretary of Health for the State of Rio de Janeiro, appointed by the late Leonel Brizola. Some months later, in 1993, Leonel Brizola invited Temporão to be the director of IVB (Instituto Vital Brazil), one of the most important developers of vaccines in Brazil.

Temporão is also a former director of the [National Institute of Cancer] (INCA), between 2003 and 2005.

== Ministry policies ==
=== Abortion ===
Temporão states that abortion should be treated by the government as a matter of public health. This represents the position of President Lula, as well. This caused outrage from more conservative sectors of the Brazilian society, such as the National Conference of Brazilian Bishops, and his own mother, described by him as a very devout Catholic. During Pope Benedict XVI's visit to Brazil, he ceased to give statements about the issue, at the request of his mother.

=== Dengue and yellow fever ===
One of the first challenges encountered by Temporão as Health Minister was two endemic crises. The first was a yellow fever outbreak near Pirenópolis, inward Goiás, and the other was a dengue outbreak in Rio (Rio de Janeiro). During the dengue endemic, he was criticized by César Maia, then Mayor of Rio. Temporão responded that an outbreak in which several people died was not the most suitable moment for a mutual exchange of accusations. In 2001, he had been appointed by Maia as Sub-Secretary of Health for the City of Rio. He held office for five months, leaving because of political disagreements with Maia.

=== LGBT community ===
During Temporão's term he launched a national awareness campaign about the risk of HIV infection among the members of the LGBT community.

During the 1st National LGBT Conference, he announced that he would support an ordinance allowing sex reassignment surgery to be performed by the Sistema Único de Saúde (SUS), Brazil's public health system.

=== HIV/AIDS ===
On 10 October 2008, it was announced that SUS would be authorized, starting in 2009, to distribute Raltegravir, an antiretroviral drug for people with HIV who have developed multidrug resistance to common treatments. This is the 18th drug incorporated by Brazil's HIV treatment program.

== Friction with his party ==
After declaring that the National Health Foundation is corrupt, Temporão came into conflict with members of his own party in the Congress. The president of the foundation is Danilo Forte, which is affiliated with Henrique Eduardo Alves, leader of the Brazilian Democratic Movement Party in the Lower House. Despite pressures from the Congress, President Lula denied that Temporão or any other ministers would be dismissed before the 2010 elections. On 5 September 2011, he joined the Brazilian Socialist Party.

== Other activities ==
- Drugs for Neglected Diseases Initiative (DNDi), Member of the Friends of DNDi
