= Cambeses (Barcelos) =

- Civil parish
- Location in Portugal
- Coordinates: 41.483°N 8.532°W
- Country: Portugal
- Region: Norte
- Intermunic. comm.: Cávado
- District: Braga
- Municipality: Barcelos

Area
  - Total: 3.31 km^{2} (1.28 sq mi)

Population (2011)
  - Total: 1,300
  - Density: 390/km^{2} (1,000/sq mi)
- Time zone: UTC+00:00 (WET)
  - Summer (DST): UTC+01:00 (WEST)

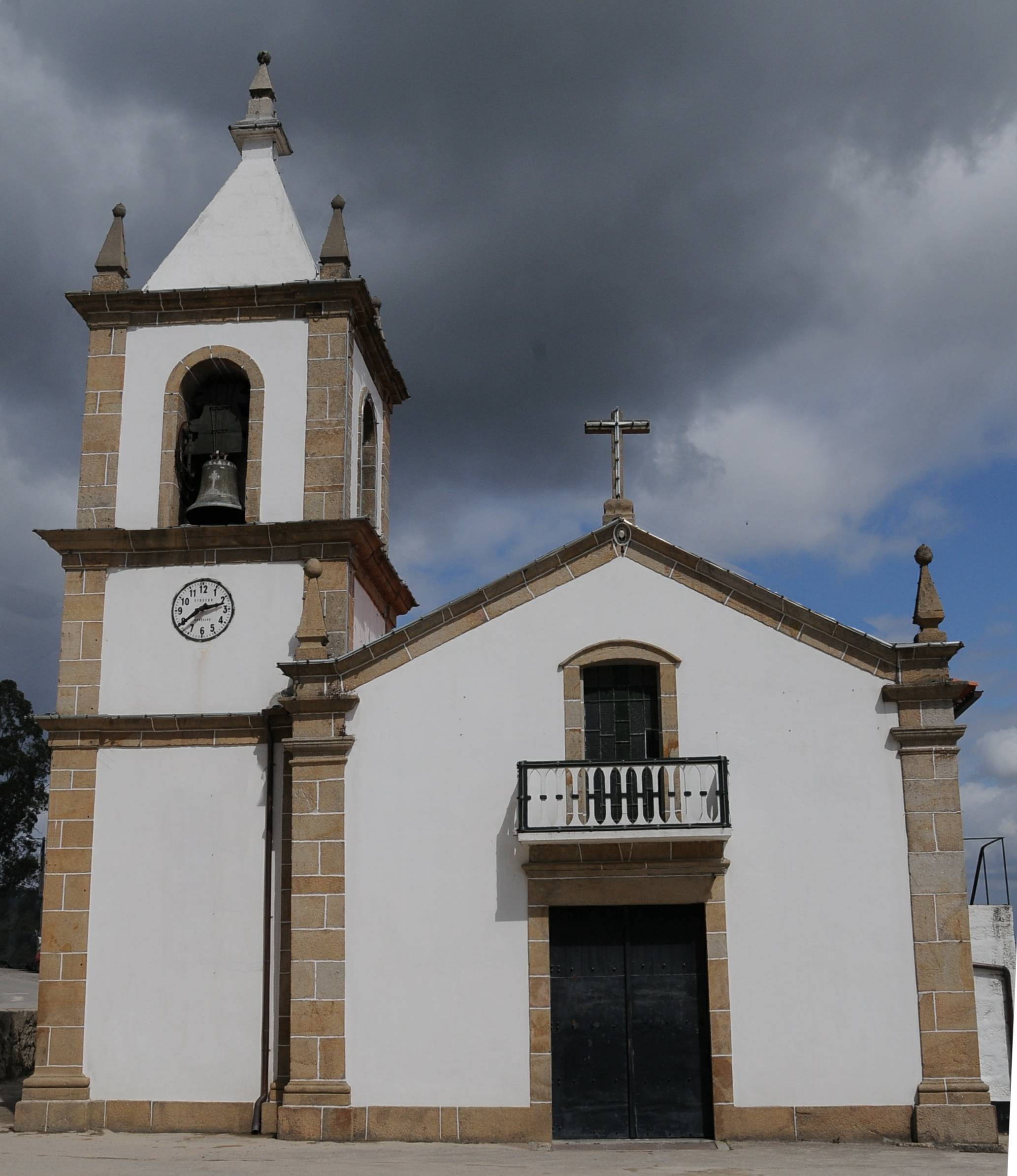
Cambeses Church

Cambeses is a Portuguese freguesia ("civil parish"), located in the municipality of Barcelos. The population in 2011 was 1,300, in an area of 3.31 km^{2} (1.28 sq mi).
