= Monção =

- Municipality
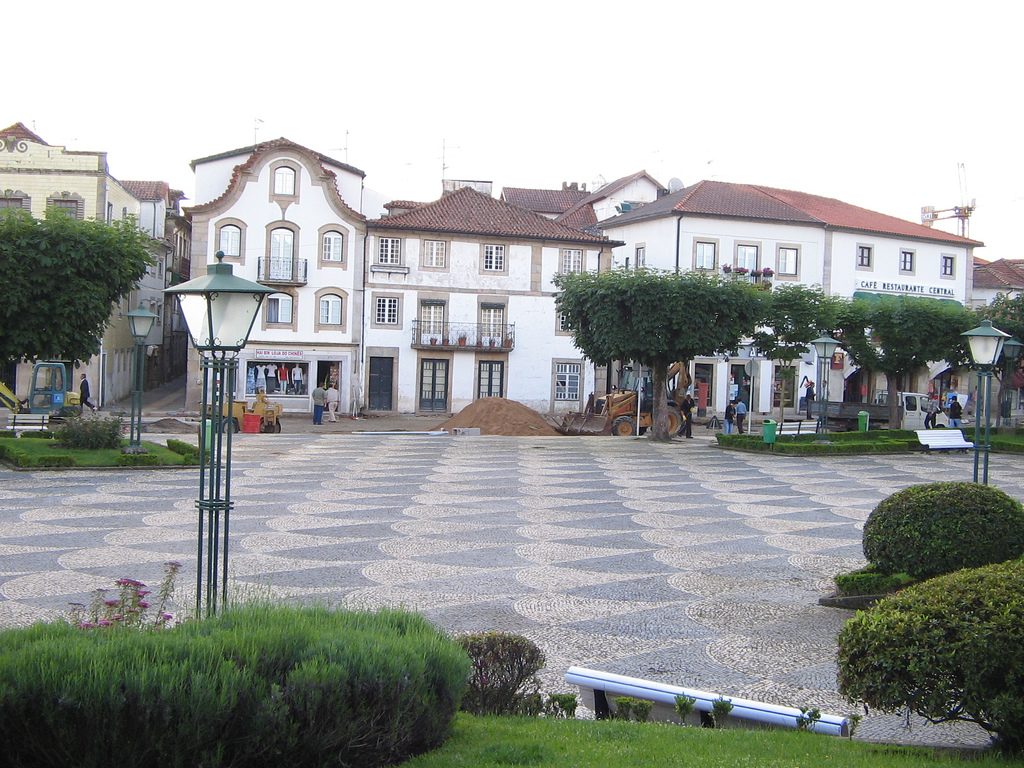

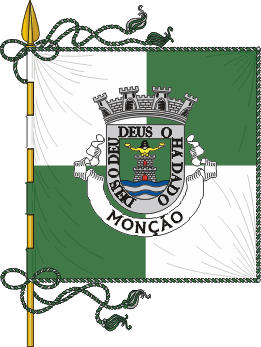
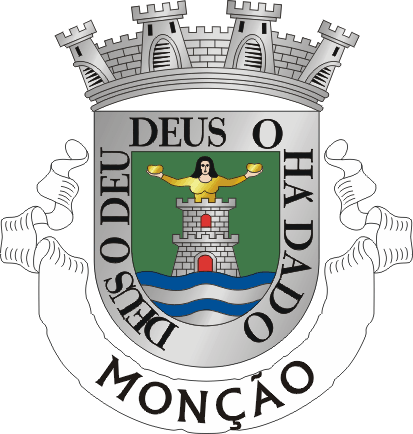
- Flag Coat of arms
- Interactive map of Monção
- Location within Portugal Location within Europe
- Country: Portugal
- Region: Norte
- Subregion: Alto Minho
- District: Viana do Castelo
- Municipal charter: March 12, 1261; 765 years ago
- Parishes: 24

Government
  - Body: Câmara Municipal de Monção
  - Mayor: António Barbosa (PPD/PSD 2025-2029)

Area
  - Land: 211.31 km^{2} (81.59 sq mi)

Population (2021)
  - Total: 17 818
- Demonym: monçanense
- Postal code: 4950
- Municipal holiday: March 12
- Website: www.cm-moncao.pt

Monção (Portuguese pronunciation: [mõˈsɐ̃w]) is a town and municipality in the Alto Minho subregion of Portugal. It is situated on the southern bank of the Minho River, which serves as the natural border between Portugal and Spain. Directly across the river lies the Spanish town of Salvaterra de Miño, with which it forms the Monção–Salvaterra de Miño Eurocity. The population in 2011 was 19,230, in an area of 211.31 km^{2}. The current mayor is the Social Democrat António Barbosa. The municipal holiday is March 12.

== Etymology ==
According to the linguist José Pedro Machado, the name Monção comes from the Latin montianus, which means mountainous, or of the mountain.

However, according to other authors, such as C. Clark and Dorothy Quillinan, the name comes from the medieval Latin name Mons Sanctum, meaning “Holy Mountain,” which in turn would have been a translation of the settlement’s ancient name, Orosion, which would have been used by the Greeks and later by the Suebi.

Until January 1935, Monção was also spelt as Monsão.

In neighbouring Spain, amongst older generations, Monção is known as Monzón, reflecting a direct translation of the Portuguese word monção, which also means “monsoon.”

== History ==
Monção received a foral (charter) from King Afonso III dated March 12th of 1261. It became famous in the course of the Fernandine Wars, due to the unparalleled action of Deu-la-deu Martins, the alcaide’s wife, which managed to end the siege imposed by Castile, by throwing their last food reserves over the walls. This is why even today, in the town’s coat of arms, a woman appears half-length, atop a tower, brandishing a loaf of bread in each hand; around her appears the town’s motto: «God gave it, God has given it», a corruption of the heroine’s name.

== Geography ==
=== Climate ===
Monção has a hot-summer Mediterranean climate (Köppen: Csa) with mild, rainy winters and hot dry summers. Although short, the summer season is dry enough to avoid being classified has a humid subtropical climate or an oceanic climate like nearby Vigo.

Climate data for Monção (Valinha), 1991-2020 normals and extremes 1971-2020
Month	Jan	Feb	Mar	Apr	May	Jun	Jul	Aug	Sep	Oct	Nov	Dec	Year
Record high °C (°F)	23.8 (74.8)	26.8 (80.2)	30.1 (86.2)	33.2 (91.8)	36.4 (97.5)	40.9 (105.6)	42.0 (107.6)	41.9 (107.4)	39.9 (103.8)	36.0 (96.8)	26.0 (78.8)	25.6 (78.1)	42.0 (107.6)
Mean daily maximum °C (°F)	13.5 (56.3)	15.4 (59.7)	18.5 (65.3)	20.1 (68.2)	23.2 (73.8)	26.7 (80.1)	29.9 (85.8)	30.2 (86.4)	27.2 (81.0)	21.8 (71.2)	16.3 (61.3)	13.8 (56.8)	21.4 (70.5)
Daily mean °C (°F)	9.2 (48.6)	10.1 (50.2)	12.9 (55.2)	14.3 (57.7)	17.1 (62.8)	20.1 (68.2)	22.6 (72.7)	22.8 (73.0)	20.5 (68.9)	16.7 (62.1)	12.1 (53.8)	9.8 (49.6)	15.7 (60.3)
Mean daily minimum °C (°F)	5.0 (41.0)	4.9 (40.8)	7.2 (45.0)	8.6 (47.5)	11.0 (51.8)	13.6 (56.5)	15.4 (59.7)	15.4 (59.7)	13.8 (56.8)	11.5 (52.7)	7.8 (46.0)	5.8 (42.4)	10.0 (50.0)
Record low °C (°F)	−5.2 (22.6)	−3.0 (26.6)	−5.1 (22.8)	−2.0 (28.4)	−0.5 (31.1)	3.8 (38.8)	7.1 (44.8)	7.0 (44.6)	4.0 (39.2)	1.0 (33.8)	−1.5 (29.3)	−3.4 (25.9)	−5.2 (22.6)
Average precipitation mm (inches)	142.8 (5.62)	99.5 (3.92)	105.2 (4.14)	109.4 (4.31)	93.2 (3.67)	42.8 (1.69)	22.2 (0.87)	27.6 (1.09)	67.4 (2.65)	160.8 (6.33)	157.1 (6.19)	154.2 (6.07)	1,182.2 (46.54)
Average precipitation days (≥ 1 mm)	12.6	10.2	10.3	11.9	10.9	5.7	3.5	4.1	6.4	11.7	12.8	12.4	112.5
Mean monthly sunshine hours	98	105	151	168	196	240	282	265	207	148	118	85	2,063
Source 1: Instituto de Meteorologia
Source 2: Portuguese Environment Agency (for sunshine 1967-1990)

== Administration ==
=== Administrative subdivisions ===
Administratively, the municipality is divided into 24 civil parishes (freguesias):

- Abedim
- Anhões e Luzio
- Barbeita
- Barroças e Taias
- Bela
- Cambeses
- Ceivães e Badim
- Lara
- Longos Vales
- Mazedo e Cortes
- Merufe
- Messegães, Valadares e Sá
- Monção e Troviscoso
- Moreira
- Pias
- Pinheiros
- Podame
- Portela
- Riba de Mouro
- Sago, Lordelo e Parada
- Segude
- Tangil
- Troporiz e Lapela
- Trute

== Demographics ==
Population of Monção Municipality (1801–2011)
1801	1849	1900	1930	1960	1981	1991	2001	2011
12,095	14,983	26,077	24,585	27,393	23,799	21,799	19,956	19,230

== Notable people ==
- Joaquim Pereira Pimenta de Castro (1846–1918), a Portuguese army officer and politician
- José Gomes Temporão (born 1951), a Brazilian doctor and Minister of Health of Brazil, from 2007 to 2010.
- Fernando Vilar (born 1954), a Uruguayan journalist and news anchor.

== See also ==
- Vinho Verde, a wine variety common to the Alto Minho
- Brejoeira Palace
- Mercy Charitys's Church of Valadares
- Longos Vales's Monastery
- Castelo de Monção
