= Interpol Terrorism Watch List =

Watching of terrorism list

ICPO-INTERPOL
- Formation: April 11, 2002; 23 years ago
- Headquarters: Lyon, France
- Secretary-General: Valdecy Urquiza
- President: Ahmed Naser Al-Raisi

Interpol launched the Interpol Terrorism Watch List on 11 April 2002 for access by Interpol offices and authorized police agencies in its 184 member countries, during the 17th Interpol Regional Conference for the Americas in Mexico City. Following the September 11 terrorist attacks and United Nations Security Council Resolution 1373, Interpol took a number of steps, including the establishment of a 24-hour, 7 days a week command center and a linkage system to identify terrorist financing lists, to support its member countries' police forces.

The Interpol Terrorism Watch List permits access by authorized police agencies to information on fugitives and suspected terrorists. The Interpol Watch List is a centralized list of those persons who are subject to Interpol notices issued for arrest (red), location (blue) and information (green). Additionally, the Terrorism Watch List includes passports reported stolen. The Watch List is available for police officers given special access codes.

Interpol also encourages the use of its I24/7 system alongside the watch list.
