= Alexander Prokopchuk =

Russian police officer

Vice President of Interpol for Europe
- In office 10 November 2016 – 18 October 2019
- President: Meng Hongwei; Kim Jong Yang
- Secretary-General: Jürgen Stock
- Succeeded by: Šárka Havránková

Personal details
- Born: 18 November 1961 (age 64) Ukraine SSR, USSR
- Relations: Ihor Prokopchuk (brother)
- Education: Kyiv State University; Financial University

Alexander Vasilyevich Prokopchuk (Russian: Александр Васильевич Прокопчук; 18 November 1961) is a Russian police officer, Major General of Ministry of Internal Affairs of the Russian Federation since 14 June 2011, and the former Vice President of Interpol for Europe from 10 November 2016 until 18 October 2019. He was the first Vice President of Interpol to be elected from Russia.

== Early life and education ==
Prokopchuk was born in the Ukrainian Soviet Socialist Republic, USSR. He graduated from Kyiv State University with a degree in Romano-Germanic Languages and Literature in 1983, and the Financial University with a degree in law in 2000. Candidate of Economic Sciences.

== Career ==
=== Interpol ===
Prokopchuk served as the Vice President of Interpol for Europe from 10 November 2016 to 18 October 2019.

During his tenure as Vice President of Interpol for Europe and following the resignation of Interpol President Meng Hongwei and his apprehension by Chinese authorities in 2018, Prokopchuk became a possible successor choice to Hongwei as President of Interpol. His candidacy was opposed and lobbied against by two Kremlin critics, Bill Browder, a British financier and CEO of Hermitage Capital Management, and Mikhail Khodorkovsky, an exiled Russian businessman, who feared that Russia would abuse the post. US Secretary of State Mike Pompeo stated that the United States is endorsing Kim Jong Yang of South Korea and called on other countries to do the same. On 21 November 2018, Interpol elected Kim Jong Yang from South Korea as its president.

== Personal life ==
Prokopchuk's younger brother, Ihor Prokopchuk, is a Ukrainian diplomat who serves as the country's permanent representative to the Organization for Security and Co-operation in Europe (OSCE).
