= Eugen Seydel =

Austrian police chief (1879-1958)

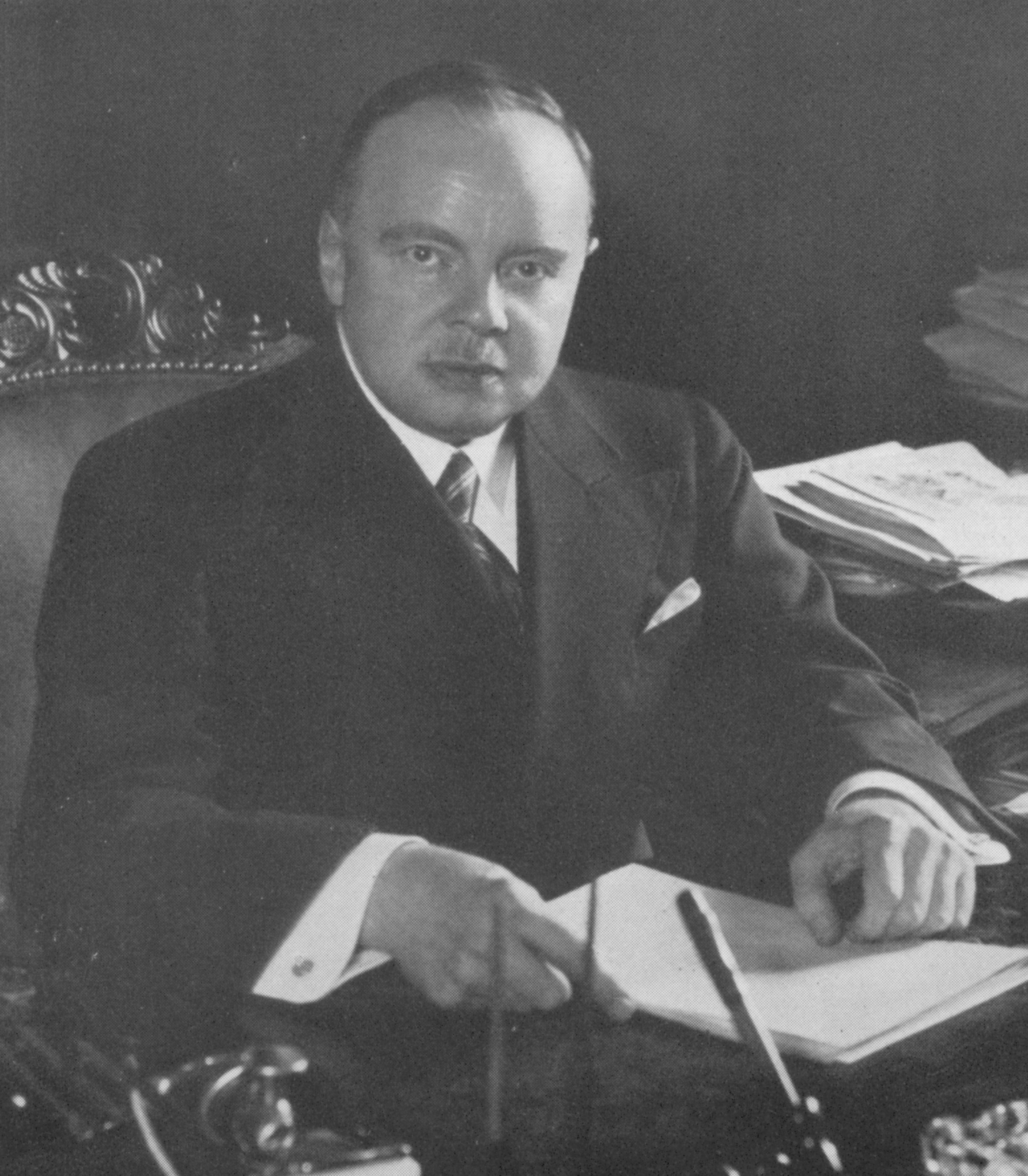
- Eugen Seydel, 1939
- Born: 1879; Vienna, Austria
- Died: 1958 (aged 78–79)
- Burial place: Meidling Cemetery
- Known for: President of ICPC 1934-1935
- Predecessor: Franz Brandl
- Successor: Micheal Skubl

Eugen Seydel was an Austrian police chief in Vienna and president of the International Criminal Police Commission (ICPC - now known as Interpol) from 1934 to 1935. Seydel was born in Vienna in 1879 and died in 1958.

== Career ==
In 1932, Seydel was appointed Vice President of the Vienna Police. From 20 March 1933 to 28 September 1934, he served as Police President, heading the Federal Police Directorate in Vienna. He subsequently held the position of President of the International Criminal Police Commission from 1934 to 1935. Seydel passed away in 1958 and was laid to rest in Meidling Cemetery in Vienna.
