= Interpol =

International police organization

Coordinates: 45.7822°N 4.8484°E

International Criminal Police Organization
- - Arabic: منظمة الشرطة الجنائية الدولية
  - French: Organisation internationale de police criminelle
  - Spanish: Organización Internacional de Policía Criminal

- Common name: Interpol
- Abbreviation: ICPO–INTERPOL
- Motto: Connecting police for a safer world

Agency overview
- Formed: 7 September 1923; 103 years ago
- Preceding agencies: First International Criminal Police Congress (1914); International Police Conference (1922); International Criminal Police Commission (1923)
- Employees: 1,050 (2019)
- Annual budget: €176 million (2023)

Jurisdictional structure
- International agency
- Countries: 196 member states
- Governing body: General Assembly
- Constituting instrument: ICPO–INTERPOL Constitution and General Regulations

Operational structure
- Headquarters: Lyon, France
- Multinational agency
- Nationalities of personnel: 130 (2024)
- Agency executives: Valdecy Urquiza, Secretary-General; Lucas Philippe, President; Sarka Havrankova, Vice President

Facilities
- National Central Bureaus: 196

Website
- interpol.int

The International Criminal Police Organization – INTERPOL (ICPO–INTERPOL), commonly known as Interpol (UK: /ˈɪntərpɒl/ IN-tər-pol, US: /-poʊl/ -pohl; stylized in all caps), is an international organization that facilitates worldwide police cooperation and crime control. It is the world's largest international police organization. It is headquartered in Lyon, France, with seven regional bureaus worldwide and a National Central Bureau in each of its 196 member states.

The organization today known as Interpol was founded on 7 September 1923 at the close of a five-day International Police Congress in Vienna as the International Criminal Police Commission (ICPC). It adopted many of its current duties throughout the 1930s. After coming under Nazi control in 1938 following the German annexation of Austria, the agency eventually had its headquarters moved to the same building as the Gestapo in Berlin. The organization remained largely inactive until the end of World War II. In 1956, the ICPC adopted a new constitution and the name Interpol, derived from its telegraphic address used since 1946.

Interpol provides investigative support, expertise and training to law enforcement worldwide, focusing on three major areas of transnational crime: terrorism, cybercrime and organized crime. Its broad mandate covers virtually every kind of crime, including crimes against humanity, child pornography, drug trafficking and production, political corruption, intellectual property infringement, as well as white-collar crime. The agency also facilitates cooperation among national law enforcement institutions through the use of criminal databases, crime information centers, and communications networks. Contrary to popular belief, Interpol is not itself a law enforcement agency.

Interpol has an annual budget of €142 million ($155 million), most of which comes from annual contributions by its member police forces in 181 countries. It is governed by a General Assembly composed of all member countries, which elects the executive committee and the president (currently Lucas Philippe of France) to supervise and implement Interpol's policies and administration. Day-to-day operations are carried out by the General Secretariat, comprising around 1,000 personnel from over 100 countries, including both police and civilians. The Secretariat is led by the secretary-general, currently Valdecy Urquiza, the former vice president of Interpol for the Americas.

Pursuant to its charter, Interpol seeks to remain politically neutral in fulfilling its mandate, and is thus barred from interventions or activities that are political, military, religious, or racial in nature and from involving itself in disputes over such matters. The agency operates in four languages: Arabic, English, French and Spanish.

== History ==
Until the 19th century, cooperation among police in different national and political jurisdictions was organized largely on an ad hoc basis, focused on a specific goal or criminal enterprise. The earliest attempt at a formal, permanent framework for international police coordination was the Police Union of German States, formed in 1851 to bring together police from various German-speaking states. Its activities were centred mostly on political dissidents and criminals. A similar plan was launched by Italy in the 1898 Anti-Anarchist Conference of Rome, which brought delegates from 21 European countries to create a formal structure for addressing the international anarchist movement. Neither the conference nor its follow up meeting in St. Petersburg in 1904 yielded results.

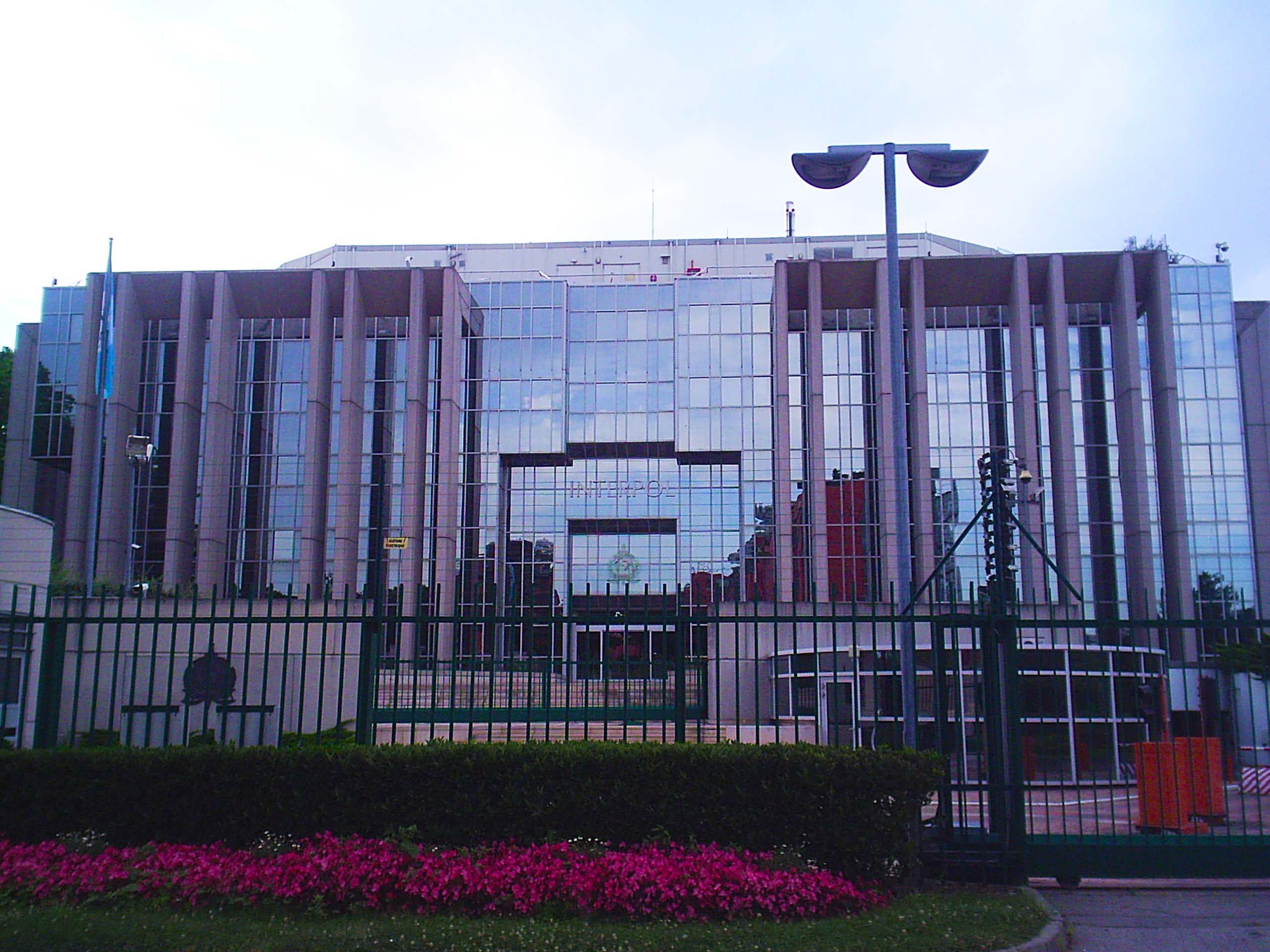
Interpol headquarters in the 6th arrondissement of Lyon, France

The early 20th century saw several attempts to formalize international police cooperation, driven by increasing international travel and commerce, which facilitated transnational criminal enterprises and fugitives on the run. The first major effort was the International Criminal Police Congress, held in Monaco in 1914. This event brought diplomats and legal officials from two dozen countries to discuss international collaboration in criminal investigations, the sharing of investigative techniques, and extradition procedures. The Monaco Congress outlined twelve principles that would eventually form the foundation of Interpol, such as establishing direct communication between police forces in different countries, creating international standards for forensics and data collection, and streamlining the process for handling extradition requests. However, the idea of an international police organization remained inactive during the First World War. In 1922, the United States attempted a similar initiative through the International Police Conference in New York City, but it failed to garner international support.

A year later, in 1923, a new initiative was undertaken at another International Criminal Police Congress in Vienna, spearheaded by Johannes Schober, President of the Viennese Police Department. The 22 delegates agreed to found the International Criminal Police Commission (ICPC), the direct forerunner of Interpol, which would be based in Vienna. Founding members included police officials from Austria, Germany, Belgium, Poland, China, Egypt, France, Greece, Hungary, Italy, the Netherlands, Japan, Romania, Sweden, Switzerland and Yugoslavia. The same year, wanted person notices were first published in the ICPCs International Public Safety Journal. The United Kingdom joined in 1928. By 1934, the ICPC's membership more than doubled to 58 nations. The United States did not join Interpol until 1938, although a U.S. police officer unofficially attended the 1923 congress.

Following the Anschluss in 1938, the Vienna-based organization fell under the control of Nazi Germany; on November 29, 1941, Interpol had offices at Am Kleinen Wannsee 16; the commission’s headquarters were eventually moved to Berlin in 1942. Most member states withdrew their support during this period. From 1938 to 1945, the presidents of the ICPC included Otto Steinhäusl, Reinhard Heydrich, Arthur Nebe and Ernst Kaltenbrunner. All were generals in the Schutzstaffel (SS); Kaltenbrunner was the highest-ranking SS officer executed following the Nuremberg trials.

In 1946, after the end of World War II, the organization was revived as the International Criminal Police Organization (ICPO) by officials from Belgium, France, Scandinavia, the United States and the United Kingdom. Its new headquarters were established in Paris, then from 1967 in Saint-Cloud, a Parisian suburb. They remained there until 1989 when they were moved to their present location in Lyon.

Until the 1980s, Interpol did not intervene in the prosecution of Nazi war criminals in accordance with Article 3 of its Charter, which prohibited intervention in "political" matters.

== Constitution ==
The role of Interpol is defined by the general provisions of its constitution.

Article 2 states that its role is:

1. To ensure and promote the widest possible mutual assistance between all criminal police authorities within the limits of the laws existing in the different countries and in the spirit of the Universal Declaration of Human Rights.
2. To establish and develop all institutions likely to contribute effectively to the prevention and suppression of ordinary law crimes.

Article 3 states:

It is strictly forbidden for the Organization to undertake any intervention or activities of a political, military, religious or racial character.

== Operating procedures ==
Contrary to the common idea due to frequent portrayals in popular media, Interpol is not a supranational law enforcement agency and has no agents with arresting powers. Instead, it is an international organization that functions as a network of law enforcement agencies from different countries. The organization thus functions as an administrative liaison among the law enforcement agencies of the member countries, providing communications and database assistance, mostly through its central headquarters in Lyon, along with the assistance of smaller local bureaus in each of its member states.

Interpol's databases at the Lyon headquarters can assist law enforcement in fighting international crime. While national agencies have their own extensive crime databases, the information rarely extends beyond one nation's borders. Interpol's databases can track criminals and crime trends around the world, specifically by means of authorized collections of fingerprints and face photos, lists of wanted persons, DNA samples, and travel documents. Interpol's lost and stolen travel document database alone contains more than 12 million records. Officials at the headquarters also analyse this data and release information on crime trends to the member countries.

An encrypted Internet-based worldwide communications network allows Interpol agents and member countries to contact each other at any time. Known as I-24/7, the network offers constant access to Interpol's databases. While the National Central Bureaus are the primary access sites to the network, some member countries have expanded it to key areas such as airports and border access points. Member countries can also access each other's criminal databases via the I-24/7 system.

Interpol issues eight types of Interpol notices, seven of which are: red, blue, green, yellow, black, orange, and purple. An eighth special notice is issued at the request of the United Nations Security Council. As of 2019, there were 62,448 valid Red and 12,234 Yellow notices in circulation.

In the event of an international disaster, terrorist attack, or assassination, Interpol can send an Incident Response Team (IRT). IRTs can offer a range of expertise and database access to assist with victim identification, suspect identification, and the dissemination of information to other nations' law enforcement agencies. In addition, at the request of local authorities, they can act as a central command and logistics operation to coordinate other law enforcement agencies involved in a case. Such teams were deployed eight times in 2013. Interpol began issuing its own travel documents in 2009 with hopes that nations would remove visa requirements for individuals traveling for Interpol business, thereby improving response times. In September 2017, the organization voted to accept Palestine and the Solomon Islands as members.

== Finances ==
In 2019, Interpol's operating income was €142 million, of which 41 percent were statutory contributions by member countries, 35 percent were voluntary cash contributions and 24 percent were in-kind contributions for the use of equipment, services and buildings. With the goal of enhancing the collaboration between Interpol and the private sector to support Interpol's missions, the Interpol Foundation for a Safer World was created in 2013. Although legally independent of Interpol, the relationship between the two is close enough for Interpol's president to obtain in 2015 the departure of HSBC CEO from the foundation board after the Swiss Leaks allegations.

From 2004 to 2010, Interpol's external auditors was the French Court of Audit. In November 2010, the Court of Audit was replaced by the Office of the Auditor General of Norway for a three-year term with an option for a further three years.

== Offices ==
In addition to its General Secretariat headquarters in Lyon, Interpol maintains six regional bureaus and three special representative offices:

- Buenos Aires, Argentina
- Brussels, Belgium (special representative office to the European Union)
- Yaoundé, Cameroon
- Abidjan, Côte d'Ivoire
- San Salvador, El Salvador
- Addis Ababa, Ethiopia (special representative office to the African Union)
- Nairobi, Kenya
- New York City, United States (special representative office to the United Nations) (Note: Interpol also maintains a liaison office to the United Nations Office on Drugs and Crime in Vienna)
- Harare, Zimbabwe

Interpol's Command and Coordination Centres offer a 24-hour point of contact for national police forces seeking urgent information or facing a crisis. The original is in Lyon with a second in Buenos Aires added in September 2011. A third was opened in Singapore in September 2014.

Interpol opened a Special Representative Office to the UN in New York City in 2004 and to the EU in Brussels in 2009.

The organization has constructed the Interpol Global Complex for Innovation (IGCI) in Singapore to act as its research and development facility, and a place of cooperation on digital crimes investigations. It was officially opened in April 2015, but had already become active beforehand. Most notably, a worldwide takedown of the SIMDA botnet infrastructure was coordinated and executed from IGCI's Cyber Fusion Centre in the weeks before the opening, as was revealed at the launch event.

== Leadership ==
=== Presidents ===
==== Paul Dickopf (1968–1972) ====
Under the Nazi government of Adolf Hitler, Paul Dickopf was a member of the National Socialist German Students' League, Sturmabteilung and the Schutzstaffel before and during World War II.

Dickopf was elected as the president of Interpol in 1968, apparently aided by the good contacts of François Genoud to the Arab world. While his former Nazi connections were known, he maintained his post until 1972.

==== Jackie Selebi (2004–2008) ====
After being charged of corruption in January 2008, Jackie Selebi resigned as president of Interpol and was put on extended leave as National Police Commissioner of South Africa.

In July 2010 Selebi was found guilty of corruption by the South African High Court in Johannesburg for accepting bribes worth €156,000 from a drug trafficker.

==== Khoo Boon Hui (2008–2012) ====
Jackie Selebi was temporarily replaced by Arturo Herrera Verdugo, the National Commissioner of Investigations Police of Chile and former vice president for the American Zone, who remained acting president until the appointment of Singaporean Khoo Boon Hui in October 2008.

==== Mireille Ballestrazzi (2012–2016) ====
On November 8, 2012, the 81st General Assembly closed with the election of Deputy Central Director of the French Judicial Police, Mireille Ballestrazzi, as the first female president of the organization.

==== Meng Hongwei (2016–2018) ====
In November 2016, Meng Hongwei, a politician from the People’s Republic of China, was elected president during the 85th Interpol General Assembly, and was to serve in this capacity until 2018.

At the end of September 2018, Meng was reported missing during a trip to China, after being “taken away” for questioning by discipline authorities. Chinese police later confirmed that Meng had been arrested on charges of bribery as part of a national anti-corruption campaign. On October 7, 2018, INTERPOL announced that Meng had resigned his post with immediate effect and that the Presidency would be temporarily occupied by Interpol Senior Vice-president (Asia) Kim Jong Yang of South Korea.

==== Kim Jong Yang (2018–2021) ====
On November 21, 2018, Interpol’s General Assembly elected Kim Jong Yang to fill the remainder of Meng’s term, in a controversial election which saw accusations that the other candidate, Vice President Alexander Prokopchuk of Russia, had used Interpol notices to target critics of the Russian government.

Four American senators had accused Vice President Alexander Prokopchuk of abusing Red Notices, likening his election to "putting a fox in charge of the henhouse". A statement posted by the Ukrainian Helsinki Human Rights Union and signed by other NGOs raised concerns about his ability to use his Interpol position to silence Russia's critics. Russian politicians criticized the U.S. accusation as politically motivated interference.

==== Ahmed Nase Al-Raisi (2021–2025) ====
On November 25, 2021, Ahmed Naser Al-Raisi, inspector general of the United Arab Emirates’s interior ministry, was elected as president. The election was controversial due to the UAE’s human rights record, with concerns being raised by some human rights groups (e.g. Human Rights Watch) and some MEPs.

In June 2021, 35 French Parliamentarians, Members of Parliament and Senators, including from the majority and the opposition, urged President Emmanuel Macron to oppose the candidacy of the UAE's General Ahmed Nasser Al-Raisi, citing the accusations of torture against him. It was the second appeal by the deputy of the Rhône, Hubert Julien-Laferrière, who had first written to Macron earlier in 2021. He questioned how a profile like Al-Raisi's, who was responsible for the torture of political opponent Ahmed Mansoor and of a British academic Matthew Hedges, can become the president of a most respectable institution.

While the UAE was arranging trips for Al-Raisi to Interpol's member countries, opposition against the Emirati candidate amplified. A number of German MPs signed a petition to express "deep concern" and reject the candidacy of Al-Raisi for the post of Interpol director. Rodney Dixon, the British lawyer of Matthew Hedges and Ali Ahmad, submitted a complaint and urged the Swedish authorities to arrest Al-Raisi upon his arrival in Sweden. The two Britons also raised a similar request to arrest al-Raisi with the Norwegian police authorities. Both Sweden and Norway apply jurisdiction that allows them to open investigations of crime, irrespective of a person's nationality or the origin country of the crime.

In October 2021, Al-Raisi had to face further opposition, as the lawyers submitted a complaint to the French Prosecutor in Paris. The claims cited Al-Raisi's role in the unlawful detention and torture of Ali Issa Ahmad and Matthew Hedges. Filed under the principle of universal jurisdiction, the complaint gave French officials the authority to investigate and arrest foreign nationals. As Raisi is not a head of state, French authorities had all the rights to arrest and question him on entering the French territory.

As the General Assembly was approaching, the opposition was rising. In November 2021, a Turkish lawyer Gulden Sonmez filed a criminal complaint against Al-Raisi's nomination in Turkey, where the vote was to take place. Sonmez said the Emirates' attempt to cover its human rights records and to launder its reputation. Besides, Hedges and Ahmad were also expected to file a lawsuit in Turkey against Al-Raisi, ahead of the General Assembly.

==== Lucas Philippe (2025–) ====
On November 27, 2025, Lucas Philippe, senior advisor for international affairs to the General Director of the French National Police, was elected as president.

== Criticism ==
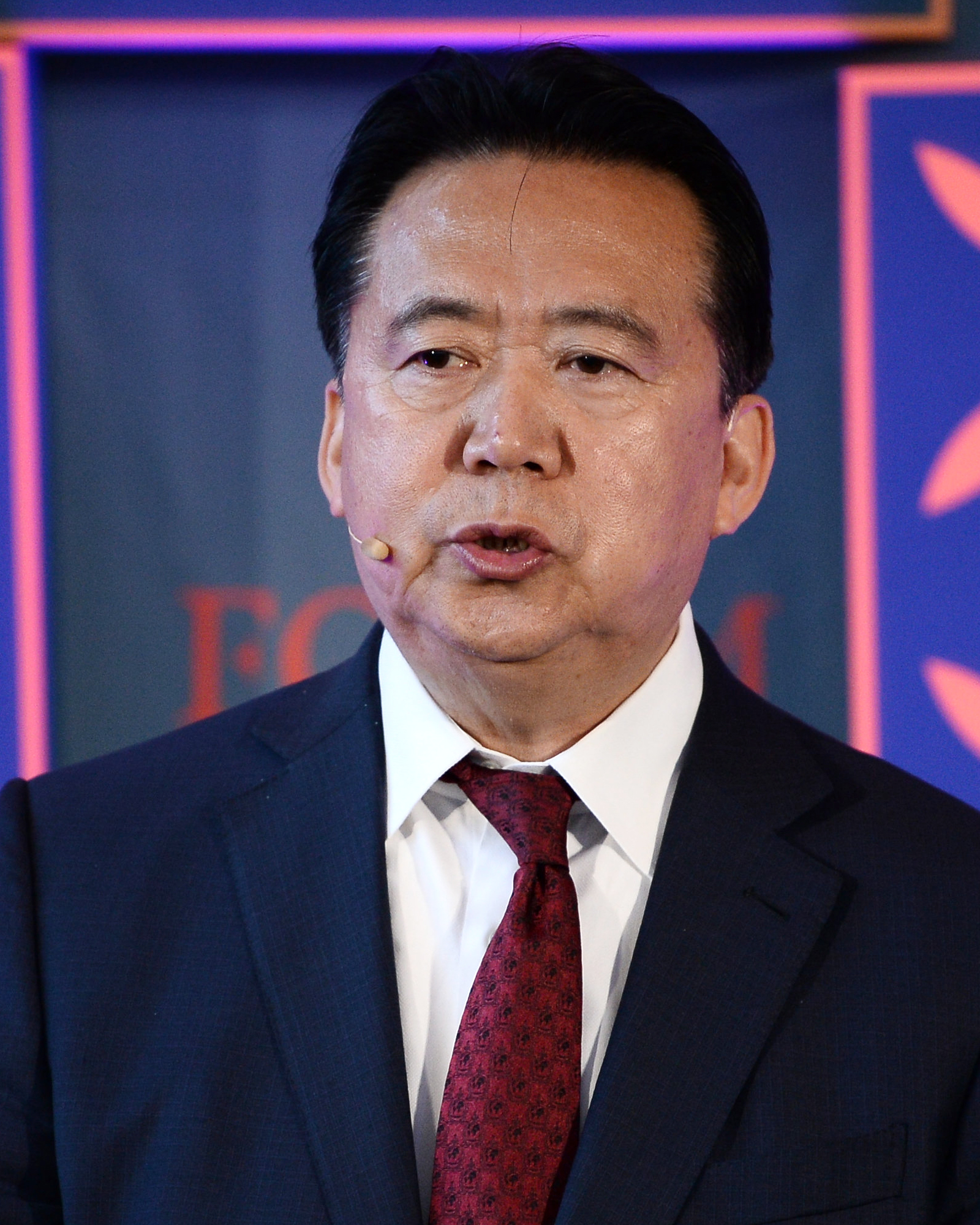
Former Interpol President Meng Hongwei was arrested in China for abusing his position for personal gain and misusing state funds and taking more than $2 million in bribes. He resigned as president of Interpol and was expelled from the Chinese Communist Party

=== Abusive requests for Interpol arrests ===
Despite its politically neutral stance, some have criticized the agency for its role in arrests for petty pretexts that critics contend were ultimately politically motivated. In their declaration, adopted in Oslo (2010), Monaco (2012), Istanbul (2013), and Baku (2014), the OSCE Parliamentary Assembly (PACE) criticized some OSCE member States for their abuse of mechanisms of the international investigation and urged them to support the reform of Interpol in order to avoid politically motivated prosecution. The resolution of the Parliamentary Assembly of the Council of Europe of 31 January 2014 criticizes the mechanisms of operation of the Commission for the Control of Interpol's files, in particular, non-adversarial procedures and unjust decisions. In 2014, PACE adopted a decision to thoroughly analyse the problem of the abuse of Interpol and to compile a special report on this matter. In May 2015, within the framework of the preparation of the report, the PACE Committee on Legal Affairs and Human Rights organized a hearing in Yerevan, during which both representatives of NGOs and Interpol had the opportunity to speak. According to Freedom House, Russia is responsible for 38% of Interpol's public Red Notices. There currently are "approximately 66,370 valid Red Notices, of which some 7,669 are public."

Refugees who are included in the list of Interpol can be arrested when crossing the border. In the year 2008, the office of the United Nations High Commissioner for Refugees pointed to the problem of arrests of refugees on the request of INTERPOL in connection with politically motivated charges.

In 2021, Turkey, China, the United Arab Emirates, Iran, Russia, and Venezuela were accused of abusing Interpol by using it to target political opponents. China used Interpol against the Uyghurs, where the government issued a Red Notice against activists and other members of the ethnic minority group living abroad. Since 1997, 1,546 cases from 28 countries of detention and deportation of the Uyghurs were recorded. In the case of Turkey, Interpol had to turn down 800 requests, including one for NBA basketball player Enes Kanter Freedom. The UAE was also accused as one of the countries attempting to buy influence in Interpol. Using the Interpol Foundation for a Safer World, the Arab nation gave donations of $54 million. The amount was estimated as equal to the statutory contributions together made by the other 194 members. It was asserted that the Emirates' growing influence over Interpol gave it the opportunity to host the General Assembly in 2018 and in 2020 (that was postponed due to the COVID-19 pandemic).

In January 2026, thousands of files provided to media by a whistleblower revealed that Russia uses Interpol to target critics abroad by accusing them of committing crimes. The data also suggested that Interpol receives more internal complaints about Russia than any other country, which had extra checks introduced on it after its invasion of Ukraine in 2022. BBC said that the leaked files suggested the introduced measures did not prevent Russia from abusing the system, and that some of the measures were quietly dropped in 2025.

==== World ====
Organizations such as Detained in Dubai, Open Dialog Foundation, Fair Trials International, Centre for Peace Studies, and International Consortium of Investigative Journalists, indicate that non-democratic states use Interpol to harass opposition politicians, journalists, human rights activists, and businessmen. The countries accused of abusing the agency include China, Russia, the United Arab Emirates, Qatar, Bahrain, Iran, Turkey, Kazakhstan, Belarus, Venezuela, and Tunisia.

The Open Dialog Foundation's report analysed 44 high-profile political cases which went through the Interpol system. A number of persons who have been granted refugee status in the European Union (EU) and the US—including Russian businessman Andrey Borodin, Chechen Arbi Bugaev, Kazakh opposition politician Mukhtar Ablyazov and his associate Artur Trofimov, and Sri Lankan journalist Chandima Withana —continue to remain on the public INTERPOL list. Some of the refugees remain on the list even after courts have refused to extradite them to a non-democratic state (for example, Pavel Zabelin, a witness in the case of Mikhail Khodorkovsky, and Alexandr Pavlov, former security chief of the Kazakh oppositionist Ablyazov). Another case is Manuel Rosales, a politician who opposed Hugo Chavez and fled to Peru in 2009 and was subject to a red alert on charges of corruption for two weeks. Interpol deleted the request for prosecution immediately. Interpol has also been criticized for mistaking people on yellow alerts. One case was Alondra Díaz-Nuñez, who in April 2015 was apprehended in Guanajuato City, Mexico being mistaken for a missing American teenager. Interpol came under heavy criticism from Mexican news and media for helping out Policia Federal Ministerial, Mexican Federal Police, and the U.S. Embassy and Consulate in Mexico, in what was believed to be a kidnapping.

==== Eastern Europe ====
The 2013 PACE's Istanbul Declaration of the OSCE cited specific cases of such prosecution, including those of the Russian activist Petr Silaev, financier William Browder, businessman Ilya Katsnelson, Belarusian politician Ales Michalevic, and Ukrainian politician Bohdan Danylyshyn.

On 25 July 2014, despite Interpol's Constitution prohibiting them from undertaking any intervention or activities of a political or military nature, the Ukrainian nationalist paramilitary leader Dmytro Yarosh was placed on Interpol's international wanted list at the request of Russian authorities, which made him the only person wanted internationally after the beginning of the 2014 Russian military intervention in Ukraine. For a long time, Interpol refused to place former President of Ukraine Viktor Yanukovych on the wanted list as a suspect by the new Ukrainian government for the mass killing of protesters during Euromaidan. Yanukovych was eventually placed on the wanted list on 12 January 2015. However, on 16 July 2015, after an intervention of Joseph Hage Aaronson, the British law firm hired by Yanukovych, the international arrest warrant against the former president of Ukraine was suspended pending further review. In December 2014, the Security Service of Ukraine (SBU) liquidated a sabotage and reconnaissance group that was led by a former agent of the Ukrainian Bureau of INTERPOL that also has family relations in the Ukrainian counter-intelligence agencies. In 2014, Russia made attempts to place Ukrainian politician Ihor Kolomoyskyi and Ukrainian civic activist Pavel Ushevets, subject to criminal persecution in Russia following his pro-Ukrainian art performance in Moscow, on the Interpol wanted list.

On October 30, 2023, Belarusian filmmaker Andrey Gnyot got arrested when he landed in Belgrade as he was put on an Interpol warrant list. He is accused by the Belarusian authorities of tax evasion and issued an extradition request. During the 2020–2021 Belarusian protests, Gnyot co-founded the Free Association of Athletes (SOS-BY), bringing together athletes opposed to the Lukashenko regime. He spent seven months in detention in Belgrade before being transferred to house arrest in June 2024. Amnesty International called on the Serbian authorities to cease the extradition process.

==== Middle East ====
According to a report by the Stockholm Center for Freedom that was issued in September 2017, Turkey has weaponized Interpol mechanisms to hunt down legitimate critics and opponents in violation of Interpol's own constitution. The report lists abuse cases where not only arrest warrants but also revocation of travel documents and passports were used by Turkey as persecution tools against critics and opponents. The harassment campaign targeted foreign companies as well. Syrian-Kurd Salih Muslim was briefly detained at Turkey's request on 25 February 2018 in Prague, the capital of the Czech Republic, but was released 2 days later, drawing angry protests from Turkey. On 17 March 2018, the Czech authorities dismissed Turkey's request as lacking merit.

On 25 January 2022, Serbian authorities extradited a Bahraini dissident, Ahmed Jaafar Mohamed Ali. The decision came despite an injunction to postpone the extradition until 25 February by the European Court of Human Rights (ECHR). Director of Advocacy at the Bahrain Institute for Rights and Democracy (BIRD), Sayed Ahmed Alwadaei criticized Interpol and said that violating the decision of ECHR indicates how "red lines will be crossed" under Interpol President Ahmed Al-Raisi's leadership. When contacted about the case by The Guardian, Interpol stated that decisions regarding extradition and arrests were the responsibility of member countries and Interpol, including its president, is not involved in the process. Human rights groups had lobbied against Ahmed Al Raisi's candidacy as Interpol President, accusing him of failing to investigate complaints of torture against UAE security forces, allegations of which he rejects.

==== Appeals and requests withdrawals ====
The procedure for filing an appeal with Interpol is a long and complex one. For example, the Venezuelan journalist Patricia Poleo and a colleague of Kazakh activist Ablyazov, and Tatiana Paraskevich, who were granted refugee status, sought to overturn the politically motivated request for as long as one and a half years, and six months, respectively.

Interpol has previously recognized some requests to include persons on the wanted list as politically motivated, e.g., Indonesian activist Benny Wenda, Georgian politician Givi Targamadze, ex-president of Georgia Mikheil Saakashvili, ex-mayor of Maracaibo and 2006 Venezuelan presidential election candidate Manuel Rosales and ex-president of Honduras Manuel Zelaya Rosales; these persons have subsequently been removed. However, in most cases, Interpol removes a Red Notice against refugees only after an authoritarian state closes a criminal case or declares amnesty (for example, the cases of Russian activists and political refugees Petr Silaev, Denis Solopov, and Aleksey Makarov, as well as the Turkish sociologist and feminist Pinar Selek).

=== Diplomacy ===
In 2016, Taiwan criticized Interpol for turning down its application to join the General Assembly as an observer. The United States supported Taiwan's participation, and the US Congress passed legislation directing the Secretary of State to develop a strategy to obtain observer status for Taiwan.

The election of Meng Hongwei, a Chinese national, as president and Alexander Prokopchuk, a Russian, as vice president of Interpol for Europe drew criticism in anglophone media and raised fears of Interpol accepting politically motivated requests from China and Russia.

=== Business ===
In 2013, Interpol was criticized over its multimillion-dollar deals with private sector bodies such as FIFA, Philip Morris, and the pharmaceutical industry. The criticism was mainly about the lack of transparency and potential conflicts of interest, such as Codentify. After the 2015 FIFA scandal, the organization has severed ties with all the private-sector bodies that evoked such criticism, and has adopted a new and transparent financing framework.

== Reform ==
From 1 to 3 July 2015, Interpol organized a session of the Working Group on the Processing of Information, which was formed specifically in order to verify the mechanisms of information processing. The Working Group heard the recommendations of civil society as regards the reform of the international investigation system and promised to take them into account, in light of possible obstruction or refusal to file crime reports nationally.

The Open Dialog Foundation, a human rights organization, recommended that Interpol, in particular: create a mechanism for the protection of rights of people having international refugee status; initiate closer cooperation of the Commission for the Control of Files with human rights NGOs and experts on asylum and extradition; enforce sanctions for violations of Interpol's rules; strengthen cooperation with NGOs, the UN, OSCE, the PACE, and the European Parliament.

Fair Trials International proposed to create effective remedies for individuals who are wanted under a Red Notice on unfair charges; to penalize nations which frequently abuse the Interpol system; to ensure more transparency of Interpol's work.

The Centre for Peace Studies also created recommendations for Interpol, in particular, to delete Red Notices and Diffusions for people who were granted refugee status according to 1951 Refugee Convention issued by their countries of origin, and to establish an independent body to review Red Notices on a regular basis.

== Emblem ==
The current emblem of Interpol was adopted in 1950 and includes the following elements:

- the globe indicates worldwide activity
- the olive branches represent peace
- the sword represents police action
- the scales signify justice
- the acronyms "OIPC" and "ICPO", representing the full name of the organization in both French and English, respectively.

== Flag ==
The current flag of Interpol was adopted in 1950 and includes the following elements:

- The lightning bolts symbolize fast telecommunication and police work
- The blue represents the official color theme of the organization
- The Interpol symbol is featured in the middle

== Membership ==
=== Members ===
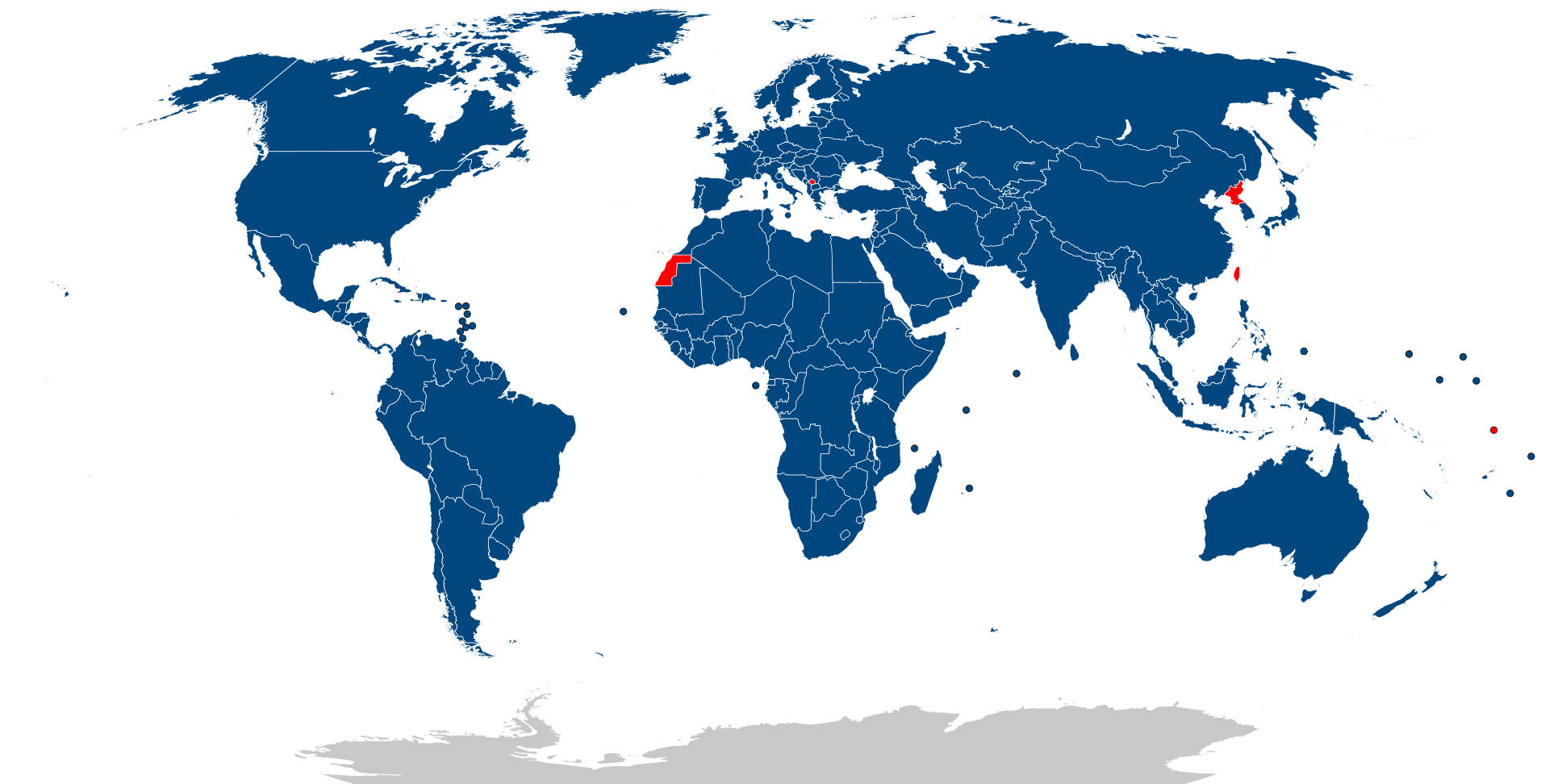
Member states Non-member states

Interpol currently has 196 member countries: Aruba, Curaçao, and Sint Maarten are members of Interpol, although they are dependent territories of the Netherlands and not sovereign states. The Constitution of the Interpol allows membership of dependent territories as long as they meet the criteria under Article 4.

Country	Date of entry
Afghanistan	21 October 2002
Albania	4 November 1991
Algeria	21 August 1961
Andorra	23 November 1987
Angola	5 October 1982
Antigua and Barbuda	6 October 1986
Argentina	13 June 1956
Armenia	4 November 1992
Aruba	23 November 1987
Australia	13 June 1956
Austria	13 June 1956
Azerbaijan	4 November 1992
Bahamas	2 October 1973
Bahrain	18 September 1972
Bangladesh	5 October 1976
Barbados	4 November 1981
Belarus	9 September 1993
Belgium	13 June 1956
Belize	23 November 1987
Benin	22 September 1961
Bhutan	19 September 2005
Bolivia	21 August 1963
Bosnia and Herzegovina	4 November 1992
Botswana	5 November 1980
Brazil	6 October 1986
Brunei	20 September 1984
Bulgaria	4 November 1989
Burkina Faso	18 September 1961
Burundi	5 October 1970
Cambodia	13 June 1956
Cameroon	18 September 1961
Canada	13 June 1956
Cape Verde	6 October 1986
Central African Republic	18 September 1961
Chad	22 September 1961
Chile	13 June 1956
China	13 June 1956
Colombia	13 June 1956
Comoros	6 October 1986
Congo	21 August 1961
Côte d'Ivoire	4 September 1961
Costa Rica	13 June 1956
Croatia	4 November 1992
Cuba	13 June 1956
Curaçao	31 October 2011
Cyprus	4 November 1962
Czech Republic	4 November 1993
Democratic Republic of the Congo	13 June 1961
Denmark	13 June 1956
Djibouti	5 October 1980
Dominica	4 November 1987
Dominican Republic	13 June 1956
Ecuador	13 June 1956
Egypt	13 June 1956
El Salvador	13 June 1956
Equatorial Guinea	18 September 1961
Eritrea	27 October 1993
Estonia	4 November 1992
Eswatini	5 November 1980
Ethiopia	13 June 1956
Fiji	6 October 1986
Finland	13 June 1956
France	13 June 1956
Gabon	22 September 1961
Gambia	21 August 1965
Georgia	4 November 1992
Germany	13 June 1956
Ghana	5 October 1958
Greece	13 June 1956
Grenada	4 November 1983
Guatemala	13 June 1956
Guinea	18 September 1961
Guinea-Bissau	6 October 1986
Guyana	6 October 1986
Haiti	13 June 1956
Honduras	13 June 1956
Hungary	4 November 1989
Iceland	13 June 1956
India	13 June 1956
Indonesia	6 October 1986
Iran	13 June 1956
Iraq	13 June 1956
Ireland	13 June 1956
Israel	13 June 1956
Italy	13 June 1956
Jamaica	4 November 1963
Japan	13 June 1956
Jordan	13 June 1956
Kazakhstan	4 November 1992
Kenya	18 September 1961
Kiribati	6 October 1986
Kuwait	18 September 1962
Kyrgyzstan	4 November 1992
Laos	6 October 1986
Latvia	4 November 1992
Lebanon	13 June 1956
Lesotho	5 November 1980
Liberia	18 September 1961
Libya	13 June 1956
Liechtenstein	4 November 1987
Lithuania	4 November 1992
Luxembourg	13 June 1956
Madagascar	18 September 1961
Malawi	5 November 1980
Malaysia	6 October 1986
Maldives	4 November 1987
Mali	22 September 1961
Malta	4 November 1962
Marshall Islands	6 October 1986
Mauritania	18 September 1961
Mauritius	6 October 1986
Mexico	13 June 1956
Micronesia	6 October 1986
Moldova	4 November 1992
Monaco	4 November 1987
Mongolia	6 October 1986
Montenegro	4 November 2006
Morocco	13 June 1956
Mozambique	5 November 1980
Myanmar	13 June 1956
Namibia	5 November 1980
Nauru	6 October 1986
Nepal	5 October 1970
Netherlands	13 June 1956
New Zealand	13 June 1956
Nicaragua	13 June 1956
Niger	22 September 1961
Nigeria	18 September 1961
North Macedonia	4 November 1992
Norway	13 June 1956
Oman	18 September 1972
Pakistan	13 June 1956
Palau	6 October 1986
Palestine	18 September 2017
Panama	13 June 1956
Papua New Guinea	6 October 1986
Paraguay	13 June 1956
Peru	13 June 1956
Philippines	13 June 1956
Poland	13 June 1956
Portugal	13 June 1956
Qatar	18 September 1972
South Korea	13 June 1956
Romania	13 June 1956
Russia	4 November 1992
Rwanda	5 October 1970
Saint Kitts and Nevis	4 November 1987
Saint Lucia	4 November 1987
Saint Vincent and the Grenadines	4 November 1987
Samoa	6 October 1986
San Marino	4 November 1987
Sao Tome and Principe	6 October 1986
Saudi Arabia	13 June 1956
Senegal	18 September 1961
Serbia	4 November 2006
Seychelles	6 October 1986
Sierra Leone	5 October 1961
Singapore	6 October 1986
Sint Maarten	31 October 2011
Slovakia	4 November 1993
Slovenia	4 November 1992
Solomon Islands	6 October 1986
Somalia	13 June 1956
South Africa	13 June 1956
South Sudan	14 November 2011
Spain	13 June 1956
Sri Lanka	13 June 1956
Sudan	13 June 1956
Suriname	6 October 1986
Sweden	13 June 1956
Switzerland	13 June 1956
Syria	13 June 1956
Tajikistan	4 November 1992
Tanzania	5 October 1961
Thailand	13 June 1956
Timor-Leste	6 October 2002
Togo	18 September 1961
Tonga	6 October 1986
Trinidad and Tobago	4 November 1962
Tunisia	13 June 1956
Turkey	13 June 1956
Turkmenistan	4 November 1992
Uganda	5 October 1961
Ukraine	4 November 1992
United Arab Emirates	18 September 1972
United Kingdom	13 June 1956
United States	13 June 1956
Uruguay	13 June 1956
Uzbekistan	4 November 1992
Vanuatu	6 October 1986
Vatican City	4 November 1992
Venezuela	13 June 1956
Vietnam	6 October 1986
Yemen	13 June 1962
Zambia	5 November 1980
Zimbabwe	5 November 1980

==== Subnational-bureaus ====
- American Samoa
- Anguilla
- Bermuda
- British Virgin Islands
- Cayman Islands
- Gibraltar
- Hong Kong
- Montserrat
- Macau
- Puerto Rico
- Turks and Caicos Islands
- United Nations for Kosovo

==== Exclusions ====
Two member states of the United Nations and three partially-recognized states are currently not members of Interpol: North Korea and Tuvalu, as well as Kosovo, Taiwan, and the Sahrawi Arab Democratic Republic.

The Republic of China (Taiwan) joined Interpol in September 1961. After the People's Republic of China was seated as "China" in the UN, Interpol transferred its recognition from the ROC to the PRC in September 1984.

Kosovo is represented by United Nations in Interpol.

In 2023, over 60 Interpol member states voiced their support for Taiwan's bid to re-join the organization. Specifically, representatives from Taiwan's diplomatic allies Eswatini, Palau, Paraguay, Belize, Saint Vincent and the Grenadines, the Marshall Islands, and Saint Kitts and Nevis spoke up for Taiwan during the assembly.

== See also ==
- Cybercrime – Type of crime based in computer networks
- Europol – European Union law enforcement agency (A similar EU-wide organization.)
- Intelligence assessment – Evaluation of sensitive state, military, commercial, or scientific information
- International Criminal Court – International tribunal organisation
- Interpol notice – International alert/announcement
- Interpol Terrorism Watch List – Watching of terrorism list
- Interpol Travel Document – Travel document issued to Interpol officers
- InterPortPolice – International organization of law enforcement agencies
- Operation Identify Me – Interpol investigation launched in 2023
- Schengen Information System – EEA database to support law enforcement
- UN Police – Part of UN peace operations
