= Ihor Prokopchuk =

Ukrainian diplomat

- Ігор Прокопчук
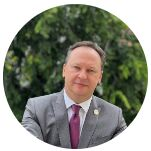

Ambassador of Ukraine to Romania
- Incumbent
- Assumed office 4 May 2022
- Preceded by: Paun Rohovei (acting)

Permanent Representative of Ukraine to the international organizations in Vienna
- In office 2010–2019
- Preceded by: Volodymyr Yelchenko

Ambassador of Ukraine to Lithuania
- In office 15 April 2008 – 2010
- Preceded by: Borys Klimchuk
- Succeeded by: Serhiy Popyk (acting)

Personal details
- Born: March 3, 1968 (age 58) Korosten, Zhytomyr Oblast, Ukrainian SSR, Soviet Union (now Ukraine)
- Children: 2
- Education: Taras Shevchenko National University of Kyiv

Ihor Vasyliovych Prokopchuk (Ukrainian: Ігор Васильович Прокопчук; 3 March 1968) is a Ukrainian diplomat.

== Early life and education ==
Prokopchuk graduated from Taras Shevchenko National University of Kyiv in 1992.

== Career ==
He started his diplomatic career in 1992 as an attaché at the Department of Information, Ukrainian Ministry of Foreign Affairs.

From 2008 until 2010 he was Ambassador of Ukraine to Lithuania.

Permanent Representative of Ukraine to the international organizations in Vienna since 2010, he is the head of the Permanent Mission of Ukraine to the OSCE.

== Personal life ==
Ihor Prokopchuk is the younger brother of Russian police officer and major general Alexander Prokopchuk, who served as Vice President of Interpol for Europe from 10 November 2016 until 18 October 2019.
