= President of Interpol =

Governing head of the International Criminal Police Organization

- Président d'Interpol
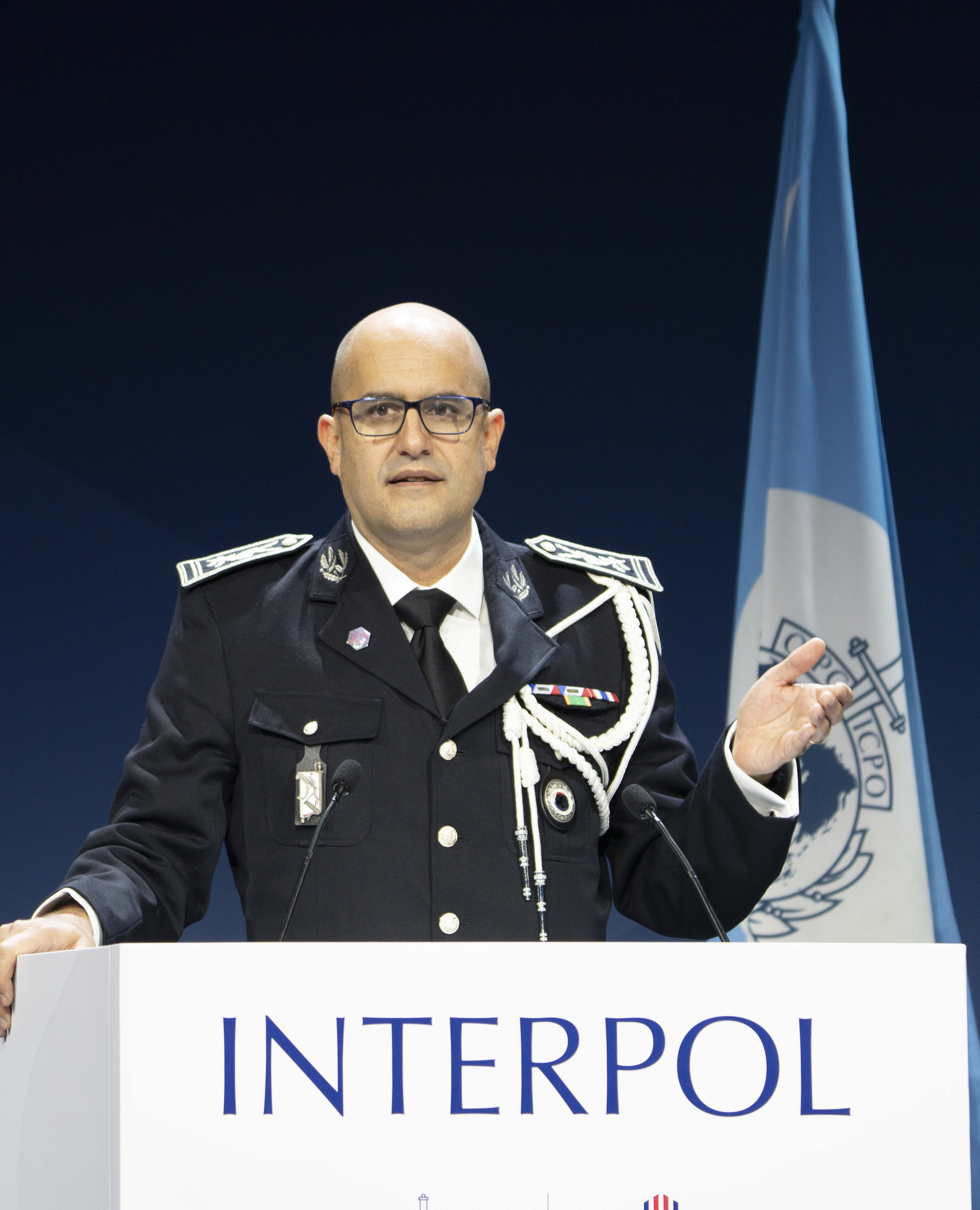
- Incumbent; Lucas Philippe since 27 November 2025
- Interpol
- Member of: INTERPOL Executive Committee; INTERPOL General Assembly
- Seat: Lyon, France
- Appointer: General Assembly
- Term length: 4 years, non-extendable
- Constituting instrument: ICPO-INTERPOL Constitution and General Regulations
- Formation: 7 September 1923 (as presidents of the ICPC); 1956 (as presidents of INTERPOL)
- First holder: Johann Schober (ICPC); Agostinho Lourenço (INTERPOL)
- Deputy: Vice-presidents
- Salary: Unpaid
- Website: Official website

The President of Interpol (French: Président d'Interpol) is the governing head of Interpol. The current president is Lucas Philippe, who was elected in November 2025. The president is tasked with presiding and directing the discussions at meetings of the General Assembly and the Executive Committee.

== List of officeholders ==
During World War II, most member states withdrew their support; as a result, Nazi German presidents are not officially recognized.

No.	Portrait	Name (Birth–Death)	Term of office			Country	Ref.
No.	Portrait	Name (Birth–Death)	Took office	Left office	Time in office	Country	Ref.
President of the ICPC
1		Johann Schober (1874–1932)	7 September 1923	1932	8–9 years	(First Austrian Republic) (Federal State of Austria) Austria	
2		Franz Brandl (1875–1953)	1932	1934	1–2 years	(First Austrian Republic) (Federal State of Austria) Austria	
3		Eugen Seydel (1879–1958)	1934	1935	0–1 years	(First Austrian Republic) (Federal State of Austria) Austria	
4		Otto Tinz (1879–1958)	1935	1935	4 months	(First Austrian Republic) (Federal State of Austria) Austria	
5		Michael Skubl (1877–1964)	1935	1938	2–3 years	(First Austrian Republic) (Federal State of Austria) Austria	
6		Otto Steinhäusl (1879–1940)	April 1938	20 June 1940 #	2 years, 2 months	Nazi Germany	
7		Reinhard Heydrich (1904–1942)	24 August 1940	4 June 1942 X	1 year, 284 days	Nazi Germany	
8		Arthur Nebe (1894–1945)	June 1942	January 1943	7 months	Nazi Germany	
9		Ernst Kaltenbrunner (1903–1946)	January 1943	12 May 1945	2 years, 4 months	Nazi Germany	
10		Florent Louwage	1945	1956	10–11 years	Belgium	
President of the INTERPOL
11		Agostinho Lourenço (1886–1964)	1956	1960	3–4 years	Portugal	
12		Sir Richard Jackson (1902–1975)	1960	1963	2–3 years	United Kingdom	
13		Fjalar Jarva (1910–1978)	1963	1964	0–1 years	Finland	
14		Firmin Franssen	1964	1968	3–4 years	Belgium	
15		Paul Dickopf (1910–1973)	1968	1972	3–4 years	West Germany	
16		William Higgitt (1917–1989)	1972	1976	3–4 years	Canada	
17		Carl Persson (1919–2014)	1976	1980	3–4 years	Sweden	
18		Jolly Bugarin (?–2002)	1980	1984	3–4 years	Philippines	
19		John Simpson (1932–2017)	1984	1988	3–4 years	United States	
20		Ivan Barbot (1937–?)	1988	1992	3–4 years	France	
21		Norman Inkster (born 1938)	1992	1994	1–2 years	Canada	
22		Björn Eriksson (born 1945)	1994	1996	1–2 years	Sweden	
23		Toshinori Kanemoto	1996	2000	3–4 years	Japan	
24		Jesús Espigares Mira (born 1946)	2000	2004	3–4 years	Spain	
25		Jackie Selebi (1950–2015)	2004	13 January 2008	3–4 years	South Africa	
26		Arturo Herrera Verdugo (born 1951); Acting	13 January 2008	9 October 2008	270 days	Chile	
27		Khoo Boon Hui (born 1954)	9 October 2008	November 2012	4 years	Singapore	
28		Mireille Ballestrazzi (born 1954)	November 2012	November 2016	4 years	France	
29		Meng Hongwei (born 1953)	10 November 2016	7 October 2018	1 year, 10 months	China	
—		Kim Jong Yang (born 1961)	7 October 2018	20 November 2018	44 days	South Korea	
30		Kim Jong Yang (born 1961)	21 November 2018	24 November 2021	3 years, 3 days	South Korea	
31		Ahmed Naser Al-Raisi	25 November 2021	27 November 2025	4 years, 2 days	United Arab Emirates	
32		Lucas Philippe	27 November 2025	Incumbent	9 months and 27 days	France	
