= Embassy of Ukraine, Vilnius =

Diplomatic mission of Ukraine to Lithuania

Embassy of Ukraine in Vilnius
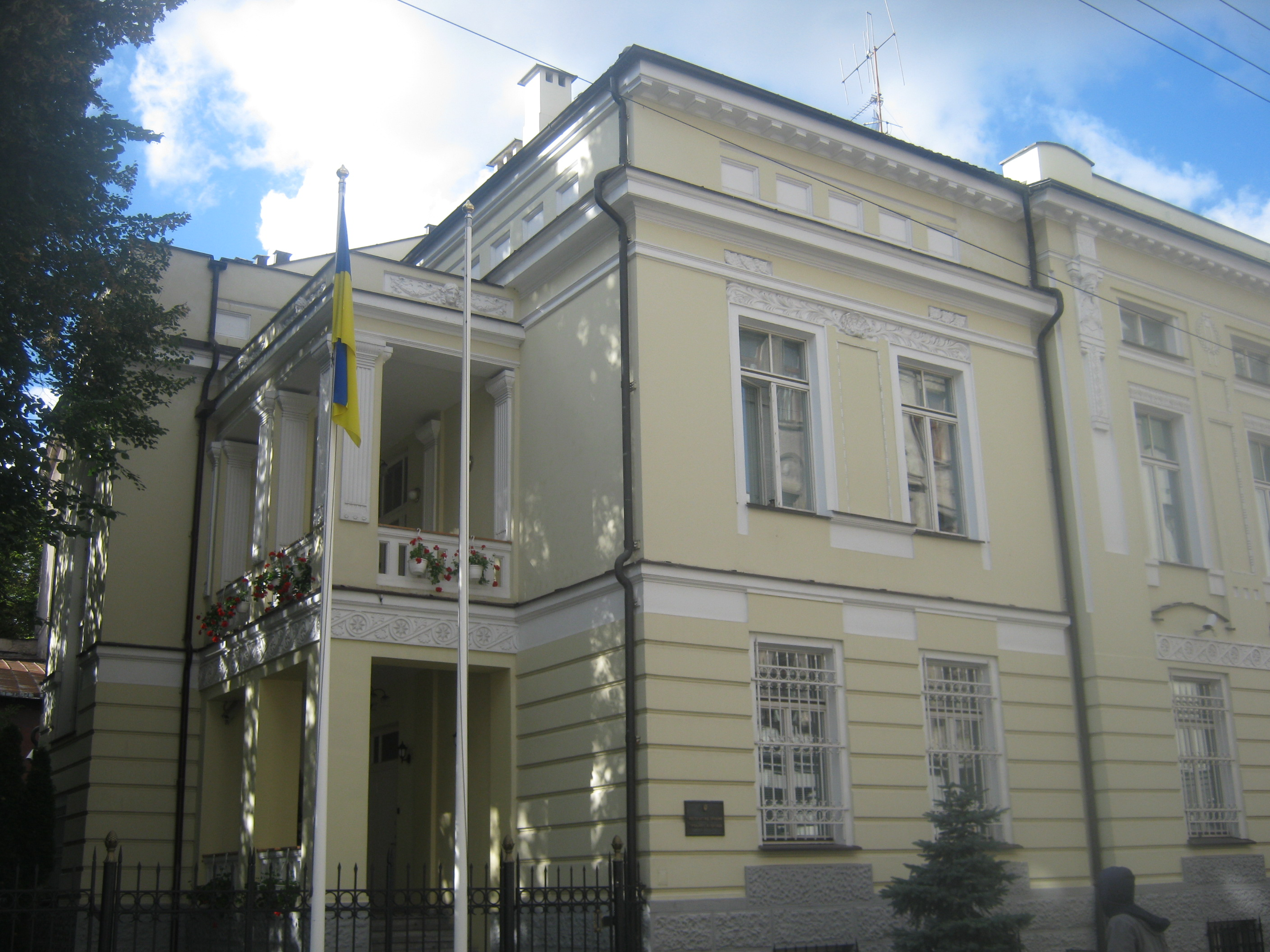
- Location: Vilnius
- Address: 4 Teatro str, Vilnius
- Coordinates: 54°40′51″N 25°16′26″E
- Ambassador: Petro Beshta

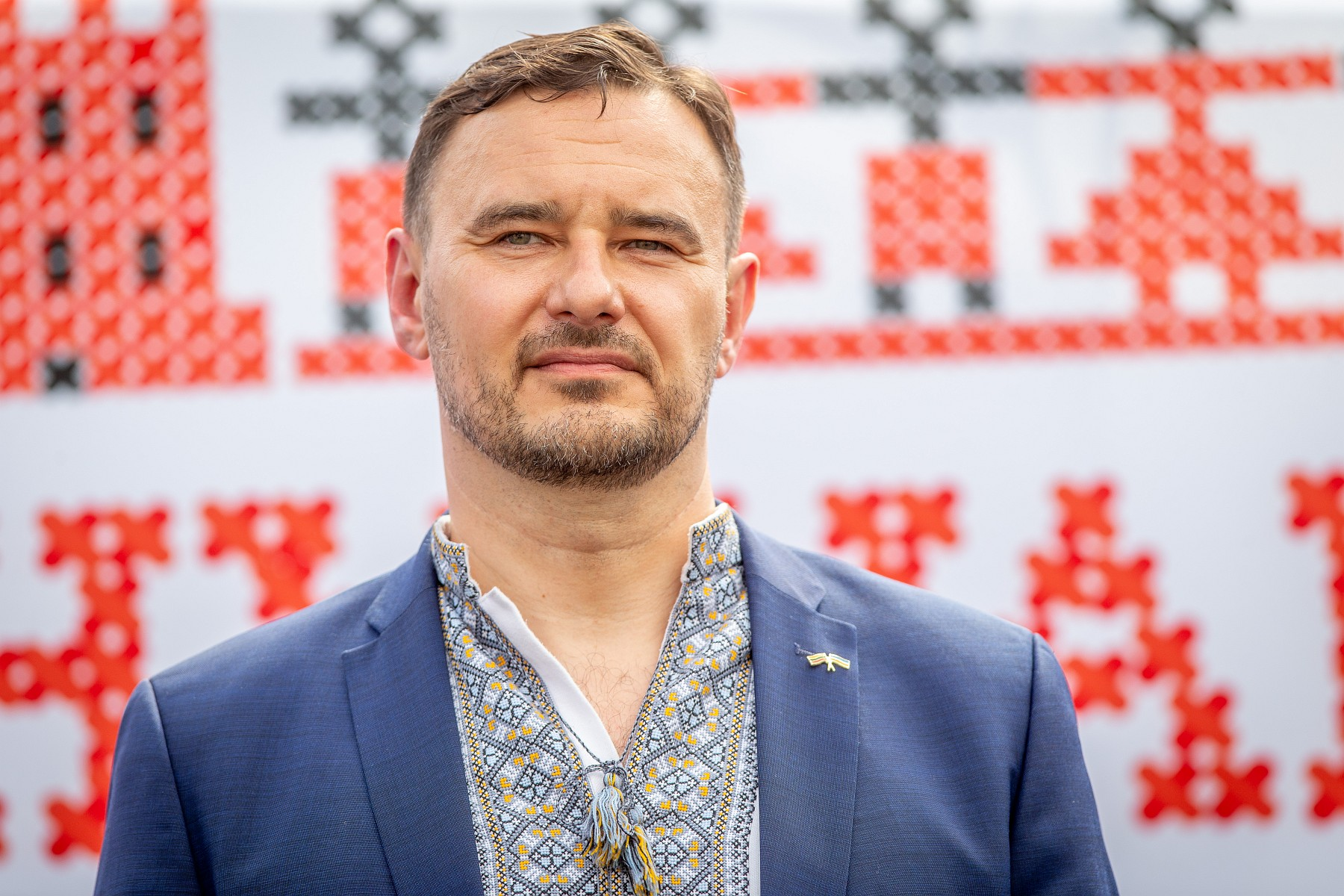
Current ambassador Petro Beshta

Embassy of Ukraine in Vilnius is the diplomatic mission of Ukraine in Lithuania.

== History ==
Ukraine recognised independence of Lithuania on 26 August 1991. Lithuania recognised independence of Ukraine on 4 December 1991. Diplomatic relations were established on 12 December 1991. The Embassy of Ukraine in Lithuania was opened in August 1993. The embassy is located in a building acquired by Ukraine in July 1994.

Ukraine has an embassy in Vilnius and 3 honorary consulates (in Klaipėda, Šalčininkai and Visaginas).

== Ambassadors ==
1. Siluyan Muzhilovsky (1649)
2. Volodymyr Kedrovskiy (1919–1921)
3. Mikhaylo Parashchuk (1921)
4. Eugene Terletsky (1921–1923)
5. Rostislav Bilodid (1992–1999)
6. Valentyn Zaichuk (2000–2001)
7. Mykola Derkach (2001–2004)
8. Boris Klimchuk (2004–2008)
9. Ihor Prokopchuk (2008–2010)
10. Valery Zhovtenko (2011–2015)
11. Volodymyr Yatsenkivsky (2015 -2021)
12. Petro Beshta (2022- )

== See also ==
- Lithuania-Ukraine relations
- Foreign relations of Lithuania
- Foreign relations of Ukraine
- Diplomatic missions of Ukraine
