= Ahmed Naser Al-Raisi =

Former president of Interpol

- أحمد الريسي
- Al-Raisi in 2022

President of Interpol
- In office 25 November 2021 – November 2025
- Secretary-General: Jürgen Stock; Valdecy Urquiza
- Preceded by: Kim Jong Yang
- Succeeded by: Lucas Philippe

Personal details
- Born: United Arab Emirates
- Education: Otterbein University; University of Cambridge; Coventry University; London Metropolitan University
- Occupation: Police officer

Ahmed Naser Al-Raisi (Note: also romanised as Ahmed Nasser Al-Raisi) (Arabic: أحمد الريسي) is an Emirati police officer and a Major General of the United Arab Emirates Ministry of Interior and the former 30th President of Interpol, serving from November 2021 to November 2025. He was elected by the general assembly of Interpol on 24 November 2021. Al Raisi was the first Arab to be elected as the President of Interpol and the first President of Interpol from the Middle East since its foundation in 1923. He was succeeded by current president Lucas Phillipe.

== Early career and education ==
Al-Raisi joined the Abu Dhabi Police Force in 1980 as a member of the "burglar alarm branch". He rose through the ranks to become General Director of Central Operations in 2005. He received a BSc in computer science from Otterbein University in 1986, a diploma in police management from the University of Cambridge in 2004, an MBA from Coventry University in 2010 and a doctorate from London Metropolitan University in 2013.

He co-authored Social & security impact of the internet, which was published by the Emirates Center For Strategic Studies and Research in 2009.

== Career ==
=== Ministry of Interior ===
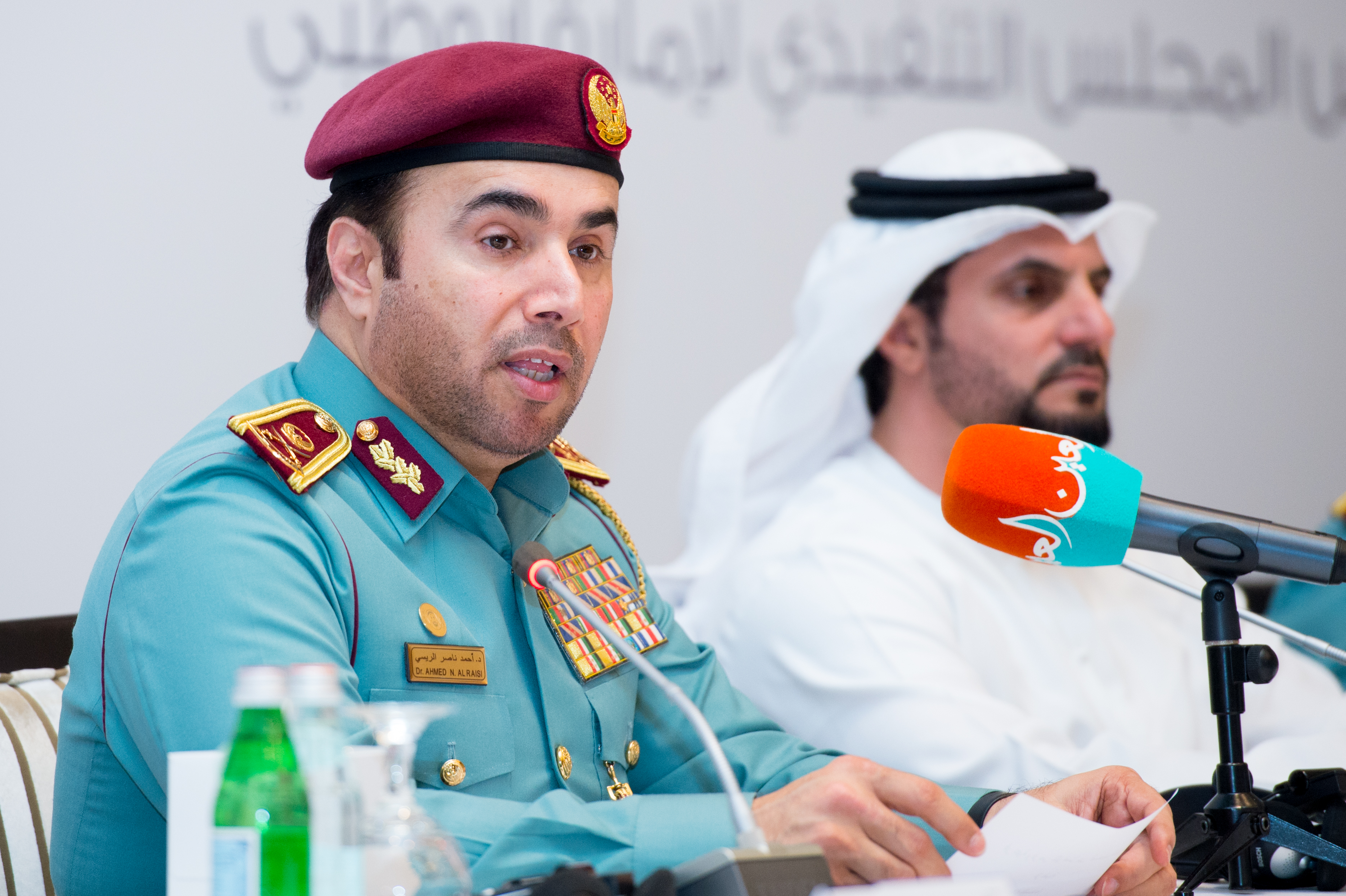
Al-Raisi as General Inspector of UAE Ministry of Interior during a press conference in 2018

Al-Raisi was appointed General Inspector of the United Arab Emirates Ministry of Interior in 2015.

According to The Guardian, he played a key role in the arrest of Matthew Hedges in 2018, a British academic arrested for espionage in the UAE. Human rights organisations accuse Al Raisi of overseeing a state security apparatus that has misused the red notice system of Interpol.

=== Interpol President ===
==== Candidacy and opposition ====
Al-Raisi was the official candidate of the United Arab Emirates to succeed Kim Jong Yang as President of Interpol in 2022. Prior to Interpol presidency, Al Raisi has served as Interpol delegate of Asia since 2018.

Al Raisi was accused of presiding over torture by two Britons, Matthew Hedges and Ali Issa Ahmad. His candidacy was opposed by a coalition of 19 non governmental organizations who wrote an open letter to Interpol advising against his appointment. A report by David Calvert-Smith, a former chief prosecutor of the United Kingdom, said that Al-Raisi is unsuited to the post. The report also accused Interpol of being influenced by a donation made by UAE to Interpol, of which was categorically rejected by an Interpol spokesperson. Matthew Hedges asked members of Interpol not to consider Al-Raisi for the position.

Al-Raisi has pursued his candidacy in an open and public manner, breaking with the typically opaque pattern of the election process.

In November 2021, three members of the German parliament released a joint statement which said that electing Al-Raisi would endanger the reputation of Interpol and that the nomination violates the second article of Interpol's basic law. The UAE Embassy in Berlin released a statement that states the accusations brought forth against Al Raisi were false. Thirty-five French legislators asked Emmanuel Macron to oppose Al-Raisi's candidacy in a letter.

==== Lawsuits and criminal complaints ====
In June 2021, a criminal complaint was filed in Paris by the Gulf Centre for Human Rights against Al-Raisi. The complaint accuses him of being responsible for the torture of Ahmed Mansoor, a prominent UAE dissident arrested in 2017.

Al-Raisi was sued by Matthew Hedges and Ali Issa Ahmed in UK, Sweden, Norway and France, where Interpol is based. Rodney Dixon, the lawyer of Matthew Hedges and Ali Ahmad, raised a complaint with the Swedish police to arrest al-Raisi upon his arrival to the country, as part of his campaign tour before the vote. Hedges and Ahmad raised a similar request with the Norwegian police authorities asking them for help and to use the opportunity of al-Raisi's visit to arrest him, if an investigation is opened. In the UK, a hearing was scheduled in February 2024 however the claimants unilaterally discontinued their claims in advance of the hearing. Matthew Hedges and Ali Issa Ahmad attempted to file another complaint in Glasgow, Scotland during the Interpol's annual general meeting in November 2024 where Al Raisi was attending however Scottish Police said they will not investigate.

A lawyer representing Emirati human rights activist Ahmed Mansoor, William Bourdon filed a torture complaint against Ahmed Nasser al-Raisi in a Paris court, under the principle of universal jurisdiction. Held in solitary confinement, Mansoor had been described as a prisoner of conscience by Amnesty International. The lawyers for Matthew Hedges and Ali Issa Ahmad, who had accused al-Raisi of torture, also filed a criminal complaint with investigative judges of the specialised judicial unit for crimes against humanity and war crimes of the Paris Tribunal.

In March 2022, a preliminary inquiry was opened by the French anti-terror prosecutors into alleged torture and acts of barbarism accusations against Al Raisi.

In May 2022, Matthew Hedges and Ali Issa Ahmad testified before the investigative judges of the specialised judicial unit for crimes against humanity and war crimes in Paris Tribunal. The two former detainees told the judge that Ahmed Nasser al-Raisi was responsible for the torture, to which they were subjected while in detention in the UAE. Ahmad said “al-Raisi is to blame, as he was the chief of police and the prison service” and that he was aware of what was happening to him in the prison.

==== Election ====
The election took place in Istanbul on 25 November with al-Raisi running against Šárka Havránková, a vice president of Interpol. Al-Raisi won after three rounds of voting and was elected for a four-year term with about 69% of votes. He is the first candidate from the Middle East to be elected president.

The United Arab Emirates are the second-largest contributor to Interpol's budget, which has led to allegations that the UAE bought the outcome of the election. Al-Raisi's part-time role will be mostly ceremonial, a fact Interpol emphasised repeatedly. However, al-Raisi seems keen to change Interpol's policies. His campaign promise to increase the use of modern technology at Interpol was seen by some as a reference to the electronic surveillance tools used by authoritarian regimes. Writing for the Neue Zürcher Zeitung, Ulrich Schmid (journalist) called his election a reason for authoritarian countries to celebrate, as it would further erode the standing of human rights in international organisations. The Guardian's Ruth Michaelson characterised the election as a "big soft-power win" for the UAE.

==== Tenure ====
Al Raisi is a member of Interpol's executive committee. In January 2022, al-Raisi arrived to headquarters of Interpol in Lyon as President of Interpol.

On 25 January 2022, Serbian authorities extradited a Bahraini dissident, Ahmed Jaafar Mohamed Ali. The decision came despite an injunction to postpone the extradition until 25 February by the European Court of Human Rights (ECHR). Director of Advocacy at the Bahrain Institute for Rights and Democracy (BIRD), Sayed Ahmed Alwadaei said violating the decision of ECHR indicates how "red lines will be crossed" under al-Raisi's leadership. He said the Interpol will be "complicit in any abuse faced by Ali". When contacted about the case by The Guardian, an Interpol spokesperson stated that decisions regarding extradition and arrests were the responsibility of member countries and Interpol is not involved in the process.

== Executive roles ==
Al-Raisi is the chairman of the American University in the Emirates board of trustees. He also chairs the board of directors of the Baniyas Club.

== Notes ==
Positions in intergovernmental organisations
Preceded by Kim Jong Yang	Former president of the International Criminal Police Organization (INTERPOL); 2018–2025	Incumbent
