= Secretary General of Interpol =

Chief administrative officer of Interpol

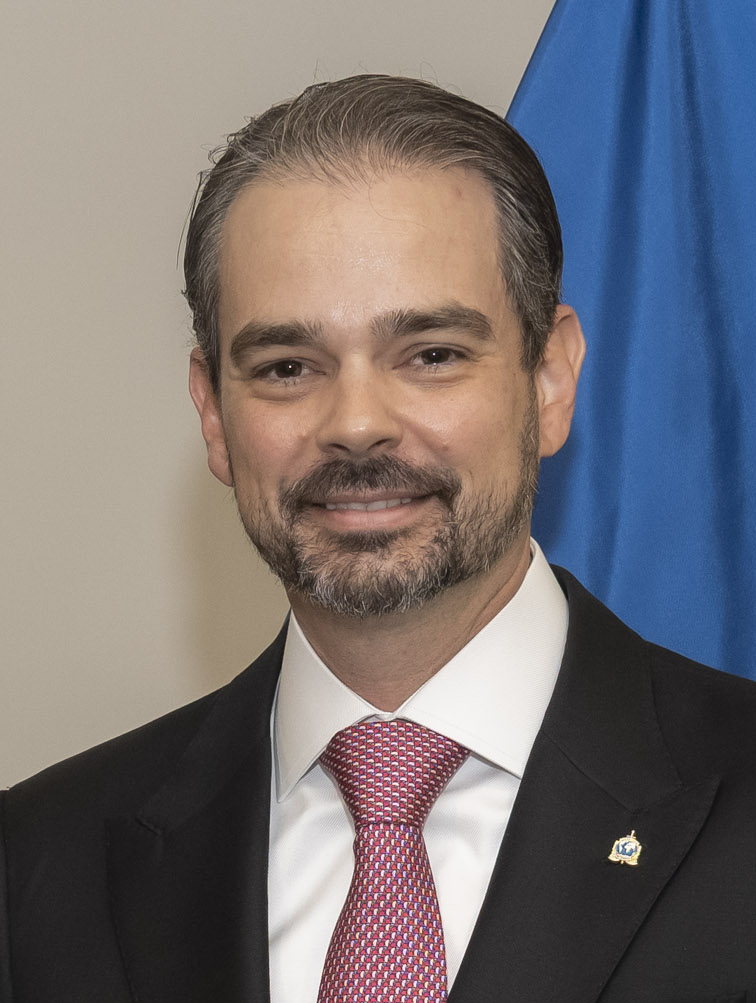
- Incumbent (Brazil) Valdecy Urquiza since 7 November 2024
- General Secretariat
- Type: Chief administrative officer
- Status: Active
- Member of: General Secretariat
- Nominator: Interpol General Assembly
- Appointer: General Assembly
- Term length: Five years renewable once
- First holder: Oskar Dressler (1923–1946)
- Website: Official website

Secretary General of Interpol is the chief administrative officer and the highest official of the Interpol. It conducts administrative tasks at the General Secretariat and is responsible for the implementation of the decisions made by the General Assembly and executive committee.

The post of Interpol's secretary general is proposed by the executive committee while the General Assembly is responsible for the appointment. It is generally appointed for a term of five years and may be re-appointed only once. Its role is principally regulated by the Articles 28–30. A secretary general is also responsible for policymaking under the General Secretariat's framework. It coordinates with the member states chiefs working in concerned department and organisations.

== History ==
Secretary general was created in 1932 under the Article 5. Prior its inception, the organisation was headed by a secretary rather than a secretary general. Oskar Dressler became the first secretary of the Interpol and he was later appointed as secretary general after the post was created in 1932. Dressler served as a secretary general of the organisation from 1932 to 1946. Valdecy Urquiza of Brazil, appointed Jürgen Stock' successor by the Executive Committee on 25 June 2024, is the first non-European/American person to be appointed to lead the organization.

== List of officeholders ==
Secretaries general since organization's inception in 1923.

| No. | Portrait | Name (Birth–Death) | Term of office | | | Country |
| No. | Portrait | Name (Birth–Death) | Took office | Left office | Time in office | Country |
|---|---|---|---|---|---|---|
| 1 | | Oskar Dressler (1878–1959) | 7 September 1923 (Note: Secretary to the International Police Congress (September 1923–October 1932)) | June 1946 | 22 years, 7 months | Austria |
| 2 | | Louis Ducloux (1883–1956) | June 1946 | June 1951 | 5 years | France |
| 3 | | Marcel Sicot (1898–1981) | June 1951 | August 1963 | 12 years, 2 months | France |
| 4 | | Jean Népote (1915–1986) | August 1963 | 26 October 1978 | 15 years, 2 months | France |
| 5 | | André Bossard (born 1926) | October 1978 | October 1985 | 7 years | France |
| 6 | | Raymond Kendall (born 1933) | October 1985 | 2 October 2000 | 15 years | United Kingdom |
| 7 | | Ronald Noble (born 1956) | 3 November 2000 | 7 November 2014 | 14 years, 4 days | United States |
| 8 | | Jürgen Stock (born 1959) | 7 November 2014 | 7 November 2024 | 10 years, 0 days | Germany |
| 9 | | Valdecy Urquiza (born 1981) | 7 November 2024 | Incumbent | 1 year, 304 days | Brazil |

== See also ==
- Secretary-General of the United Nations
- Secretary General of the Organisation of Islamic Cooperation
- Secretary General of the Organization of American States
- President of Interpol
