= Jürgen Stock =

German police officer and academic (born 1959)

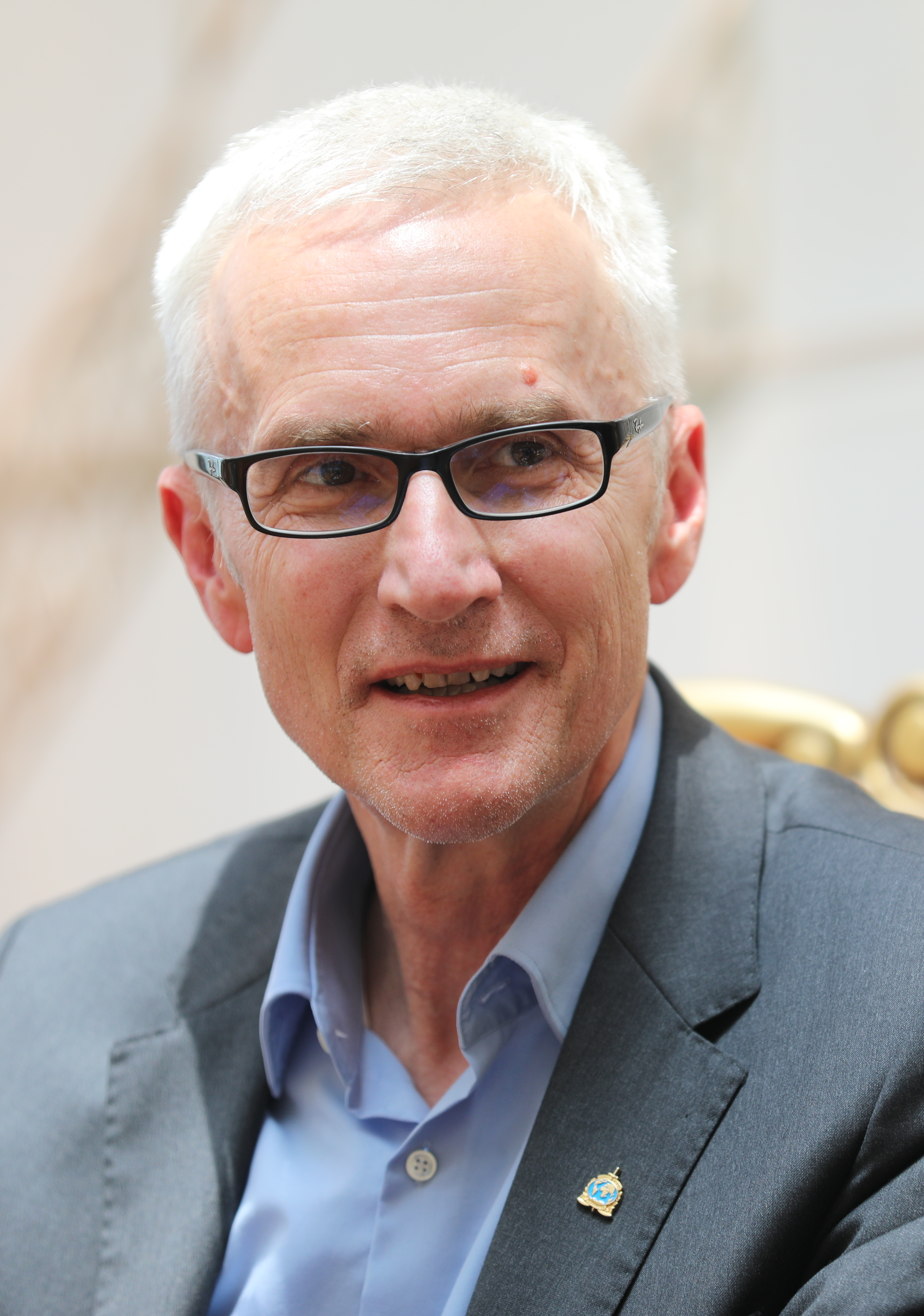
- Stock in 2016

8th Secretary General of Interpol
- In office November 7, 2014 – November 7, 2024
- President: Mireille Balestrazzi; Meng Hongwei; Kim Jong Yang; Ahmed Naser Al-Raisi
- Preceded by: Ronald Noble
- Succeeded by: Valdecy Urquiza

Personal details
- Born: 4 October 1959 (age 66) Wetzlar, West Germany
- Education: University of Giessen

Jürgen Stock (born 4 October 1959) is a German police officer and academic. He served as secretary general of Interpol from November 7, 2014 to November 7, 2024. Stock joined the Kriminalpolizei in Hesse in 1978 and stayed on as an officer until 1992. Between 1992 and 1996, he studied criminology at the University of Giessen.

== Biography ==
Stock was born on 4 October 1959, in Wetzlar, Germany. He joined the Kriminalpolizei in Hesse in 1978 and stayed on as an officer until 1992. Between 1992 and 1996 he went to the University of Giessen to occupy himself with scientific research in criminology. In 1996, he worked as a lawyer, before returning to the Bundeskriminalamt to become the deputy head of a unit combating economic crime. Stock became President of the University of Applied Police Science located in Saxony-Anhalt in 1998.

In 2000, he returned once more to the Bundeskriminalamt to head the Institute of Law Enforcement Studies and Training. In 2004, he became Vice President of the Bundeskriminalamt.

He is also an Honorary Professor of Law and Criminology at the University of Giessen.

== Interpol ==
Since 2005, Stock has worked for Interpol. He was Vice President of Europe at the organisation between 2007 and 2010. On 7 November 2014, he was elected Secretary General of Interpol by the General Assembly, he took over the position from Ronald Noble with immediate effect. He was elected for a five-year term. In October 2019, he was re-elected for a second five-year term.
