= Kim Jong Yang =

South Korean politician and police officer (born 1961)

- 김종양

Member of the National Assembly
- Incumbent
- Assumed office 30 May 2024
- Preceded by: Kim Yeong-seon

President of Interpol
- In office 21 November 2018 – 24 November 2021; Acting: 7 October 2018 — 20 November 2018
- Secretary-General: Jürgen Stock
- Preceded by: Meng Hongwei
- Succeeded by: Ahmed Naser Al-Raisi

Personal details
- Born: 30 October 1961 (age 64) Changwon, South Gyeongsang, South Korea
- Party: People Power
- Education: Korea University; Seoul National University; Dongguk University
- Occupation: Police officer

Korean name
- Hangul: 김종양
- Hanja: 金鍾陽
- RR: Gim Jongyang
- MR: Kim Chongyang

Kim Jong Yang (Korean: 김종양; born 30 October 1961) is a South Korean politician and police officer who was the 29th president of Interpol from 21 November 2018 to 24 November 2021.

== Career ==
=== National Police Agency ===
Kim was Commissioner of Gyeonggi Provincial Police Agency, the law enforcement agency for South Korea's most populous province. As a police chief, Kim took part in efforts to spread South Korean policing strategies to other nations, including the Philippines, through financial assistance and training programs.

=== Interpol ===
In 2015 Kim was elected as Interpol's vice-president for Asia.

Following the arrest and detainment of Interpol President Meng Hongwei in China, Kim took on the role of Acting President.

Although Interpol Vice-president and Russian interior ministry official Alexander Prokopchuk had been widely tipped to be Meng's successor, at a meeting in Dubai on 18–21 November 2018 Kim was elected to serve the remaining two years of Meng's term. Prokopchuk's candidacy had been opposed by Western nations, which had objected to the Russian government's abuses of Interpol red notices to target dissidents and political opponents.

Positions in intergovernmental organisations
Preceded by Meng Hongwei	President of Interpol; 2018–2021	Succeeded by Ahmed Naser Al-Raisi
