= Otto Steinhäusl =

German Schutzstaffel (SS) officer (1879–1940)

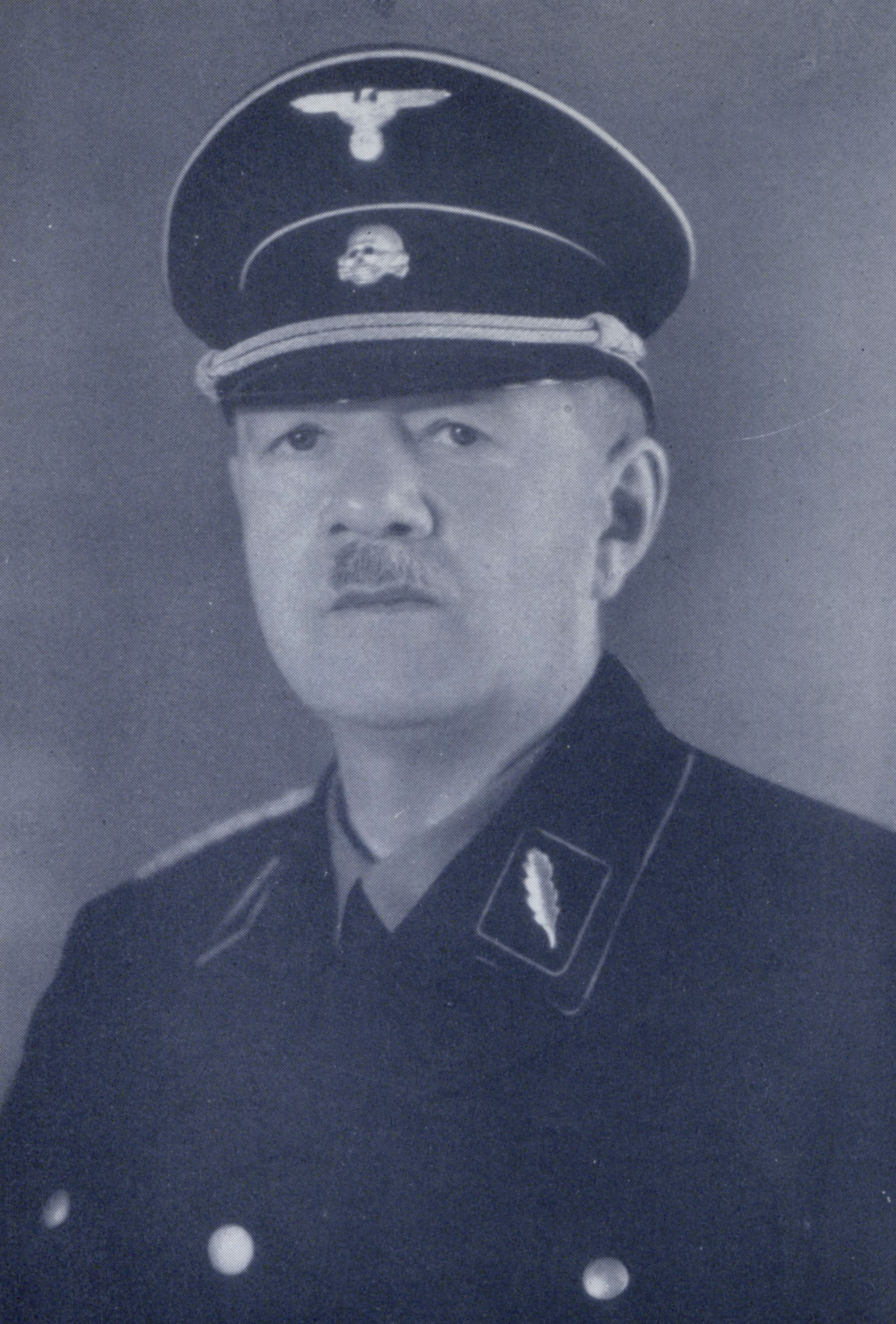
- Steinhäusl in the uniform of an SS-Standartenführer, 1939.
- Born: 10 March 1879; Budweis, Austria-Hungary
- Died: 20 June 1940 (aged 61); Vienna, Ostmark, Nazi Germany
- Military career
- Allegiance: Austria (to 1938); Nazi Germany
- Branch: Schutzstaffel
- Rank: Oberführer
- Commands: Polizeipräsident of Vienna
- Awards: Anschluss Medal

Otto Steinhäusl (10 March 1879 – 20 June 1940) was an Austrian-born SS-Oberführer, Polizeipräsident (police president) of Vienna, and President of the International Criminal Police Commission (ICPC) (1938–1940).

== Early career ==
In 1902/03 he served in the 17th Infantry Regiment as a one-year volunteer. He received his doctorate in law in 1905. In 1906/07 he completed his judicial year, after which he was a conceptual trainee at the Vienna Police Department. In 1911 he was transferred to Moravian-Ostrava and built up the security service there. For his contribution to the unmasking of Colonel Redl, he received the Golden Cross of Merit. He returned to Vienna in 1913 and was promoted to police commissioner in 1915. During the First World War, he worked in the Records Office of the Austro-Hungarian Counterintelligence Service. In 1919 he was promoted to police superintendent and in 1921 to police councilor. Steinhäusl served as Vienna's head of police and Polizeipräsident starting in the early 1930s. It is also believed to be the time which he joined the underground Austrian SS. Otto Strasser alleged that Steinhäusl was a secret Gestapo agent, and that in July 1933 there was an operation orchestrated by Steinhäusl to either kidnap Strasser, and smuggle him across the German frontier, or imprison him. However, the attempt met with failure.

In the aftermath of the assassination of Austrian Chancellor Engelbert Dollfuss on 25 July 1934, Steinhäusl was found to be one of the conspirators and arrested. In December 1935, he was sentenced to 7 years in prison by a military court for high treason. Steinhäusl was released from prison in July 1936, due to the Juliabkommen.

== Anschluss and reinstatement ==
On the morning of 12 March 1938, the 8th Army of the German Wehrmacht crossed the German-Austrian border. They did not face resistance by the Austrian Army—on the contrary, the German troops were greeted by cheering Austrians with Hitler salutes, Nazi flags and flowers. Due to this, the Nazi invasion is also called the Blumenkrieg (war of flowers). By noon on the same day, Reichsführer-SS Heinrich Himmler removed the current President of the International Criminal Police Commission, Dr. Michael Skubl, who would later be replaced by Steinhäusl, who had just been released from prison. Steinhäusl was reinstated as Polizeipräsident of Vienna, and promoted to SS-Standartenführer on the day of the Anschluss.

== Polizeipräsident of Vienna and President of the ICPC ==
Steinhäusl (left) with Oberst der Schutzpolizei Carl Retzlaff in 1939. Retzlaff was commander of the Schutzpolizei in Vienna.

As Polizeipräsident of Vienna, Steinhäusl conspired with two higher leaders of the Austrian SS, Fridolin Glass and Josef Fitzthum, to retain the existing force structure of the Austrian police. Hoping to preempt a massive reorganization that might place their own careers in jeopardy, they persuaded the chief of Ordnungspolizei, Kurt Daluege, to refrain from a purge, claiming that most of the detectives, policemen, and even neighborhood patrolmen had been illegal Nazi activists before the Anschluss. Daluege was sceptical but agreed to wait until evidence could be organized and scrutinized. The response was the concoction of fraudulent documents that included backdated membership cards, forged dossiers, fabricated reports, and a host of other laundered or counterfeit items. By September 1938 nearly 1,000 policemen were officially confirmed to have been activists, of whom 700 were also admitted into the SS.

As sociologist Mathieu Deflem writes, "Steinhäusl became the new International Criminal Police Commission President in April 1938. Not only was Steinhäusl’s loyalty to Germany secure, German leaders also reckoned he would be but an interim figure, as he was known to suffer from tuberculosis. The first meeting under Steinhäusl’s Presidency, in Bucharest in 1938, produced only one unanimous decision: that the next meeting was to be held in Berlin. A preliminary program for the Berlin meeting was drafted, a copy has survived in the FBI files on Interpol, but, as noted, the meeting was canceled."

== Death and aftermath ==
Steinhäusl, a long-time sufferer of tuberculosis, died on 20 June 1940 in Vienna. He was 61 years old.

Secretary General of the International Criminal Police Commission, Oskar Dressler sent a report to all ICPC members which specified that he and other police, including Nazi officials Arthur Nebe and others, had decided "to request the Chief of the German Security Police" to accept the Presidency of the ICPC. Reportedly, twenty-seven police officials representing 15 states consented to the suggestion. Because this was less than two-thirds of the total ICPC membership, the countries that could not be addressed were not counted and those that had abstained were considered as not voting against the motion, so that, the Nazi controlled ICPC leadership reasoned, the necessary majority was reached. In a circular letter of 24 August 1940, Reinhard Heydrich declared that he had been informed that his candidacy as ICPC President had "passed unanimously". Heydrich continued that he would "lead the Commission into a new and successful future" and that the ICPC headquarters would “from now on be located in Berlin".

== Summary of SS career ==
=== Dates of rank ===
- SS#292773
- SS-Standartenführer: 12 March 1938
- SS-Oberführer: 25 July 1938

=== Notable decorations ===
- Anschluss Medal (1938)

== See also ==
- Interpol

Government offices
Preceded by Michael Skubl	President of the ICPC; 1938–1940	Succeeded by Reinhard Heydrich
