= Lucas Philippe =

President of INTERPOL

President of Interpol
- Incumbent
- Assumed office 27 November 2025
- Secretary-General: Valdecy Urquiza
- Preceded by: Ahmed Naser Al-Raisi

Personal details
- Born: France
- Occupation: Police officer

Lucas Philippe is a French police officer and the Senior Advisor for International Affairs to the General Director of the French National Police. Mr. Philippe is serving as the current and 31st President of Interpol since 27 November 2025

== Early career ==
Philippe began his career in 1995 as an lieutenant in the National Police, working in the anti-terrorism section of the judicial police in Paris before moving to anti-gang unit in Marseille and later coordinating international partners of the Anti-Narcotics Unit.

Philippe provided security sector support to the Libyan government as an attaché of the French government from 2011-2013 before leaving the police force in 2017. During this time, Philippe launched two security-related businesses in Singapore. In 2020 he returned to the National Police, focusing on international cooperation in the Director-General's office.
