= Meng Hongwei =

Chinese politician (born 1953)

- 孟宏伟
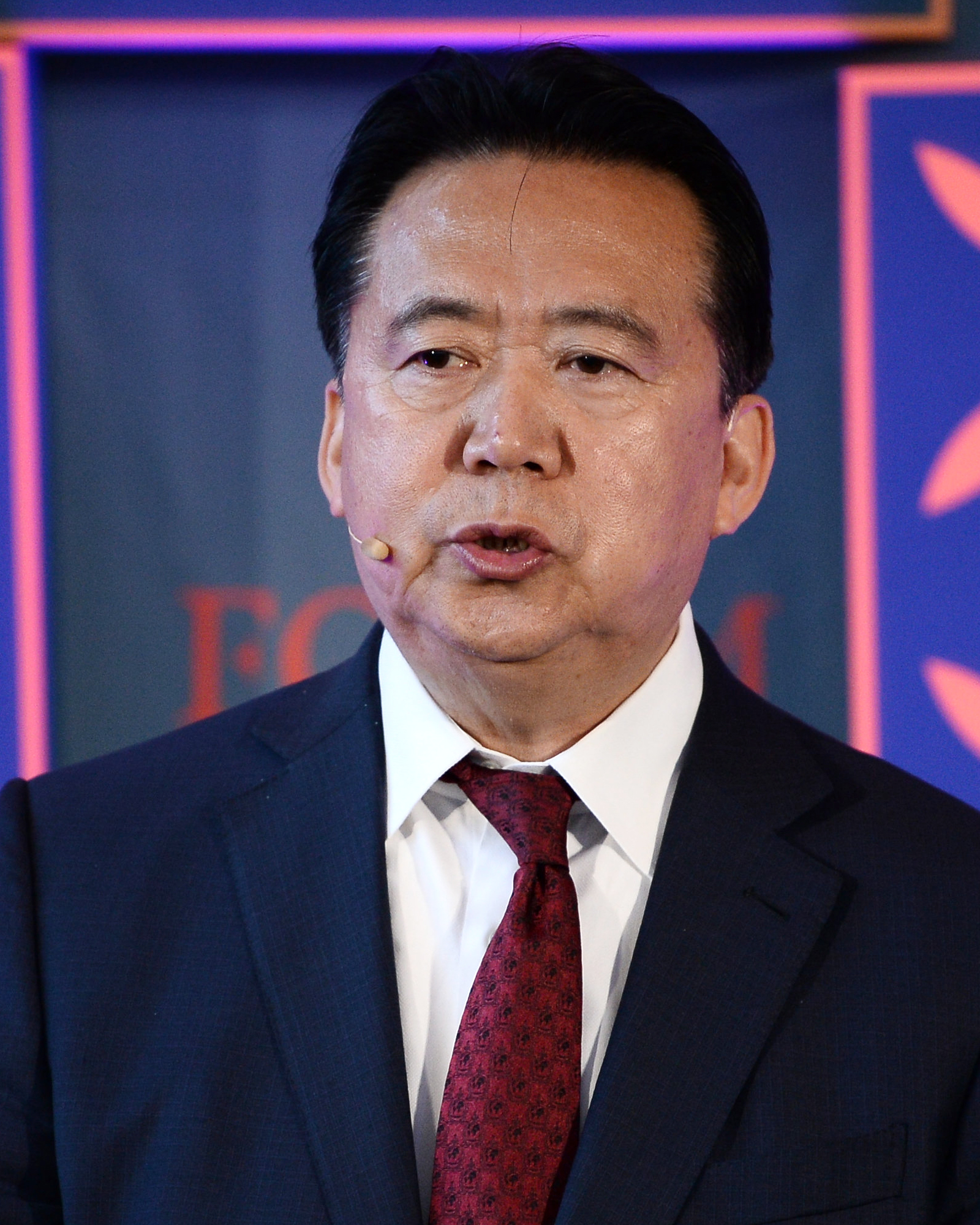
- Meng in 2017

President of Interpol
- In office 10 November 2016 – 7 October 2018
- Secretary-General: Jürgen Stock
- Preceded by: Mireille Ballestrazzi
- Succeeded by: Kim Jong Yang

Vice Minister of Public Security
- In office 10 April 2004 – 7 October 2018
- Minister: Zhou Yongkang; Meng Jianzhu; Guo Shengkun; Zhao Kezhi
- Premier: Wen Jiabao; Li Keqiang

Deputy Director of the State Oceanic Administration
- In office 18 March 2013 – 8 December 2017
- Premier: Li Keqiang
- Director: Liu Cigui; Wang Hong

Director of the China Coast Guard
- In office 18 March 2013 – 8 December 2017
- Premier: Li Keqiang
- Preceded by: Position created
- Succeeded by: Position abolished

Personal details
- Born: November 1953 (age 72) Harbin, Heilongjiang, China
- Party: Chinese Communist Party (1975-2019, expelled)
- Spouse: Grace Meng
- Children: 2
- Education: Peking University

Meng Hongwei (simplified Chinese: 孟宏伟; traditional Chinese: 孟宏偉; pinyin: Mèng Hóngwěi; born November 1953) is a former Chinese politician and police officer who was the President of Interpol from 2016 to 2018. He also served as Vice-minister of Public Security in China from 2004 to 2018. Meng purportedly resigned in absentia in October 2018 via Chinese officials after he was secretly detained and accused of taking bribes by Chinese anti-corruption authorities. On 21 January 2020, Meng had been sentenced to 13 1/2 years in jail by a Chinese court for bribery during his time at the China Coast Guard and Ministry of Public Security.

== Early life and career ==
Meng was born in Harbin, Heilongjiang, in 1953. He entered the workforce in 1972 and joined the Chinese Communist Party (CCP) in 1975. He graduated from Peking University with a bachelor's degree in law in 1983

He has 40 years of experience in criminal justice and policing. He served as Vice-Minister of Public Security from 2004 until his arrest in 2018. He served as Director of the Maritime Police Bureau and deputy director of China's State Oceanic Administration from 2013 until 2017. In April 2018, without explanation, he was relieved of his membership of the CCP committee at the Ministry of Public Security. It was unclear whether this was due to his declining political fortunes or due to his age.

=== Interpol ===
In 2004, Meng became the head of Interpol's China branch.

He was elected as President of Interpol on 10 November 2016, becoming the first Chinese head of the agency. His election was viewed as a success for China's ambitions to gain influence within international organisations. Dissidents feared that China would use Meng to track exiled opponents. During his presidency, the Chinese government submitted extensive lists of officials and business people wanted for questioning on allegations of corruption, which critics claimed were politically motivated. His term as president was due to last until 2020, but he resigned in October 2018 after being detained by Chinese authorities.

== Corruption accusations ==
=== Secret detention ===
Meng left Sweden on 18 September 2018, and landed in China on a flight from Stockholm on 19 September. On 25 September, Meng sent his wife Grace Meng (Gao Ge) an emoji of a knife, suggesting that he was in danger. The South China Morning Post reported that Meng had been taken away for questioning by "discipline authorities" on his arrival in China. French newspaper Le Parisien added that he was under investigation in China, suspected of favouring a company in a cybersecurity procurement.

On 4 October, Mrs. Meng reported her husband missing to the French police. She was given police protection after being threatened by phone and Internet. As of January 2019, Mrs. Meng was seeking asylum in France.

=== Prosecution ===
On 6 October 2018, Interpol officially demanded to know Meng's status from the Chinese government. The next day, the Central Commission for Discipline Inspection announced that Meng was being investigated by the National Supervisory Commission, an anti-corruption agency, for allegedly taking bribes, and that a task force would be set up to pursue his alleged associates. Meng was also accused of "willfulness", which public administration expert Zhu Lijia said might indicate that he "may not have strictly toed the party lines".

Interpol also received Meng's letter of resignation, with immediate effect, and said the organisation's acting senior vice president, Kim Jong Yang of South Korea, would be acting president until a permanent replacement was elected at a meeting in Dubai in November 2018. Interpol's press release did not mention whether Meng had resigned under duress. Grace Meng has threatened Interpol with legal action over its lack of investigation into the authenticity of the resignation.

On 26 October 2018, Meng was removed from the Chinese People's Political Consultative Conference, China's top political advisory body. On 27 March 2019, the Central Commission for Discipline Inspection and the National Supervisory Commission announced that Meng was expelled from the CCP and removed from all posts.

In April 2019, Meng's wife sued Interpol for failing to assist her at the Permanent Court of Arbitration. In 2021, she criticised the Chinese government as being "a monster" because she said in a figurative sense that, "they eat their children". She said the charges of accepting bribes were "trumped up", and that the CCP really purged him because "he used his high-profile position to push for change". "It's a fake case. It's an example of a political disagreement being turned into a criminal affair. The extent of corruption in China today is extremely serious. It's everywhere. But there are two different opinions about how to solve corruption. One is the method used now. The other is to move toward constitutional democracy, to solve the problem at its roots."

On 24 April 2019, a statement by the Supreme People's Procuratorate said that prosecutors "decided to arrest Meng Hongwei on suspicion of accepting bribes". On 20 June 2019, he pleaded guilty for accepting bribes over 14.5 million yuan or $2.11 million. He was sentenced on 21 January 2020 to 13½ years of jail time and fined CNY 2 million for the accepting of bribes and abusing his position. He did not apply for appeal to the court sentence.

== See also ==
- Lists of solved missing person cases

Positions in intergovernmental organisations
Preceded by Mireille Ballestrazzi	President of Interpol; 2016–2018	Succeeded by Kim Jong Yang
