= Centre for Peace Studies, Tromsø =

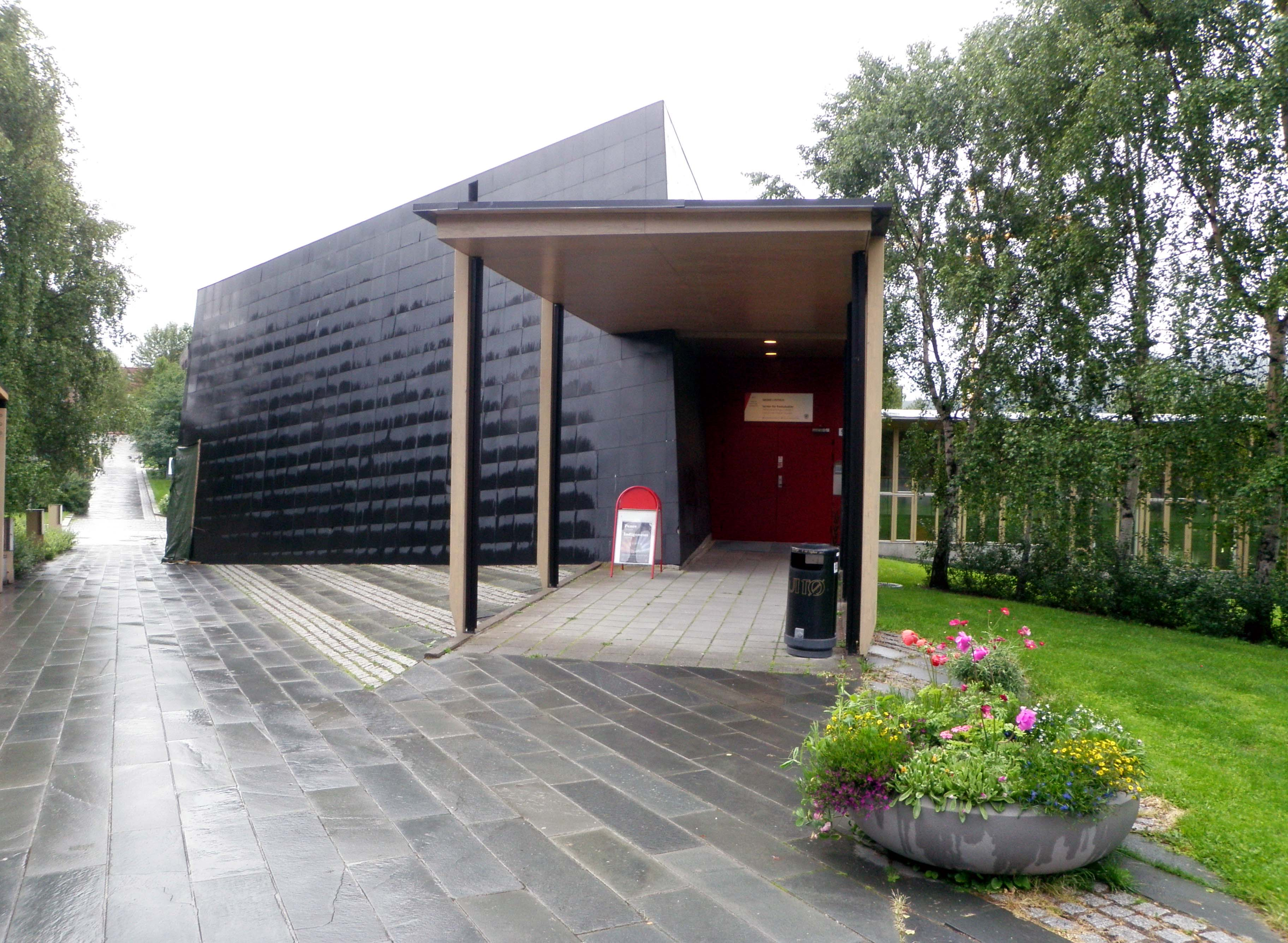
Centre for Peace Studies building at the University of Tromsø

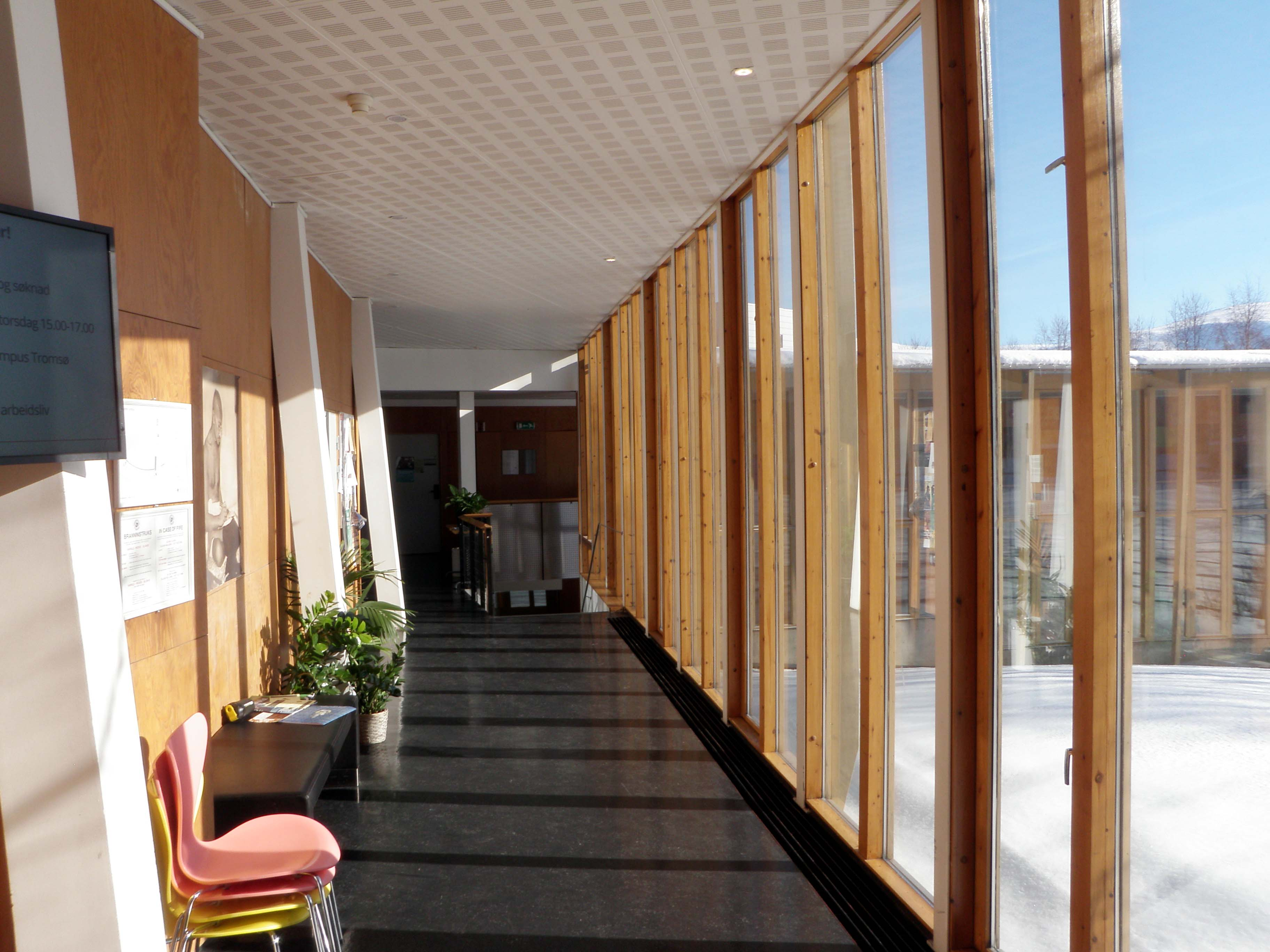
Entrance hall of the Centre for Peace Studies building

The Centre for Peace Studies started out as a research and co-ordination project in Peace and Conflict Studies at the University of Tromsø, Norway. The project was initially funded for the period 2002-2006 and became permanent in 2007.

Inspired by the conference Higher Education for Peace on 4–6 May 2000, dreams, ambitions and hopes for such a project saw results when in November 2001 the Norwegian Parliament awarded the funds needed to establish a national and international centre for Peace Studies. The assignment letter states that "the Centre is to establish new competence within the field of peace- and conflict-studies, and within such areas as ethnicity and democracy-building. The centre is to have a co-ordinating role for the field, both nationally and internationally."

The Centre is also in charge of a two-year Master's Programme in Peace and Conflict Transformation at the University of Tromsø, which has been taught since August 2002.

In the field of Peace Research, the centre's main position is to focus on non-violent forms of conflict resolution, emphasizing the task of building a positive, sustainable peace. In other words, the centre's task is not primarily to analyze wars or keep an account of wars, armament or civil wars, but rather to focus how – and on what basis – a civil and transnational, sustainable peace can be built. In November 2002 this work started with a symposium on non-violence, where leading experts on Peace Research from all continents met in Tromsø to establish the current status of the field and point the way ahead.
