= Khoo Boon Hui =

Singaporean police chief

- 邱文晖
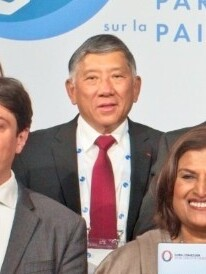
- Khoo in 2019

President of Interpol
- In office 2008–2012
- Preceded by: Jackie Selebi; Arturo Verdugo (acting)
- Succeeded by: Mireille Ballestrazzi

Commissioner of Police
- In office 1997–2010
- Preceded by: Tee Tua Ba
- Succeeded by: Ng Joo Hee

Personal details
- Born: 1954 (age 71–72) Singapore
- Education: University of Oxford (BA); Harvard University (MPA)
- Profession: Police officer

Khoo Boon Hui
- Simplified Chinese: 邱文晖
- Traditional Chinese: 邱文暉
Transcriptions
Standard Mandarin
- Hanyu Pinyin: Qiū Wénhuī
Southern Min
- Hokkien POJ: Khu Bûn-hui

Khoo Boon Hui (Chinese: 邱文晖; pinyin: Qiū Wénhuī; Pe̍h-ōe-jī: Khu Bûn-hui; born 1954) is a Singaporean former police officer who has been serving as Senior Deputy Secretary at the Ministry of Home Affairs. Khoo served as President of Interpol from 2008 to 2012, and Commissioner of Police from 1997 to 2010.

== Education ==
Upon graduation from Anglo-Chinese School, Khoo was conferred the Singapore Armed Forces Overseas Scholarship in 1973.

Khoo graduated from St John's College, University of Oxford in 1976 with a Bachelor of Arts degree in engineering and economics. He subsequently went on to complete a Master of Public Administration degree at the Harvard Kennedy School in 1982. He also attended the Advanced Management Program at Wharton School in 2002.

== Career ==
Despite being an SAF scholar, Khoo was called to join the Singapore Police Force (SPF) after a short stint in the Singapore Armed Forces (SAF). He began his career in 1977 and has held various appointments, including Director of Strategic Planning in 1987, Police Chief of Staff in 1990, Director of Criminal Investigation Department in 1991 and Deputy Commissioner of Police in 1995.

In July 1997, he was appointed Commissioner of Police. Khoo held the post for 14 years and was succeeded by Ng Joo Hee on 1 February 2010, taking on a new post of Senior Deputy Secretary at the Ministry of Home Affairs.

In 2017, Khoo was appointed to the Global Commission on the Stability of Cyberspace, and he served on the commission until its successful conclusion in 2019, participating in the drafting of its eight norms related to non-aggression in cyberspace.

== Interpol ==
Khoo was one of the three vice-presidents of the Interpol Executive Committee from 2006 to 2009. On 9 October 2008, Khoo was elected as the president of Interpol for a four-year term.

== Awards and recognition ==
For his contribution to the police service, he was awarded the Public Administration Medal (Silver) in 1992, the Long Service Medal in 1998 as well as the Meritorious Service Medal and 2nd Clasp to the Singapore Police Service Long Service in 2003.

He was also conferred the Knight Grand Cross (First Class) of the Most Noble Order of the Crown of Thailand by the King of Thailand in March 2002, the Bintang Bhayangkara Utama (National Police Meritorious Service Star) by the President of Indonesia in June 2002 and the Panglima Gagah Pasukan Polis (Kerhormat) (Knight Grand Commander, Order of Police Heroism) by the Yang di-Pertuan Agong of Malaysia in April 2003. In July 2004, Khoo was conferred the Darjah Pahlawan Negara Brunei Yang Amat Perkasa Darjah Pertama (Order of the Hero of the State of Brunei, First Class) by the Sultan and Yang Di-Pertuan of Brunei Darussalam and it comes with the title of Dato Seri Pahlawan.

In Aug 2005, His Majesty Seri Paduka Baginda Yang di-Pertuan Agong XII of Malaysia conferred the Award, Darjah Kebesaran Panglima Setia Mahkota (Kerhormat) (PSM) to Khoo. The award, literally translated as Commander of the Most Distinguished Order of the Crown (Honorary).

== Personal life ==
Khoo is married to Puan Sri Betty Au. The couple have two children.

Positions in intergovernmental organisations
Preceded by Arturo Herrera Verdugo (Acting)	President of the International Criminal Police Organization (INTERPOL); 2008–2012	Succeeded by Mireille Balestrazzi
