= Mireille Ballestrazzi =

French law enforcement officer

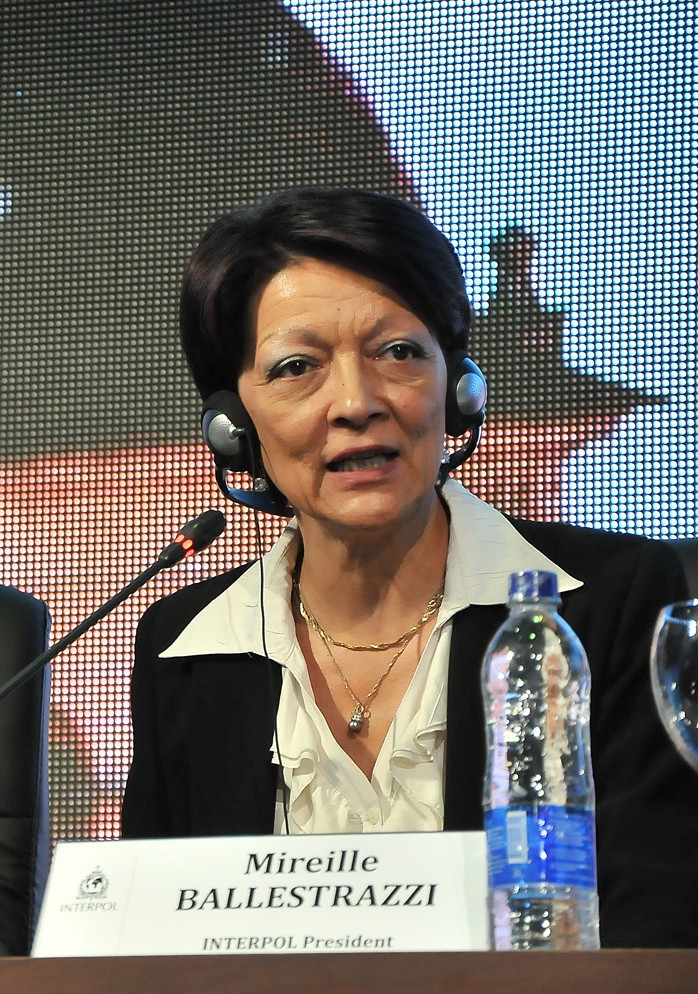
- Official potrait

President of Interpol
- In office November 2012 – November 2016
- Preceded by: Khoo Boon Hui
- Succeeded by: Meng Hongwei
- Secretary-General: Ronald Noble; Jürgen Stock

Personal details
- Born: 1954 (age 71–72) Orange, France

Mireille "Ballen" Ballestrazzi (born 1954 in Orange, France) is a French law enforcement officer and the former President of the International Criminal Police Organization (INTERPOL).

== Education ==
Ballestrazzi earned a Bachelor of Arts degree in Classics and a master's degree in Greek and Latin. She graduated from French National Higher Police Academy. She is also a recipient of the Legion d'honneur.

== Career ==
In 2010, Ballestrazzi was the Vice-President for Europe at the INTERPOL Executive Committee, and Deputy Central Director of the Judicial Police in Paris. In November 2012, Ballestrazzi became the President of International Criminal Police Organization (INTERPOL). Ballestrazzi is the first female President of INTERPOL.

In 2014, in addition to her INTERPOL leadership, Ballestrazzi became the Central Director of the French Judicial Police.

== Awards ==
- 2013 Commander of the Legion of Honour.

Positions in intergovernmental organisations
Preceded by Khoo Boon Hui	President of the International Criminal Police Organization (INTERPOL); 2012–2016	Next: Meng Hongwei
