= Arrest of Matthew Hedges =

Arrest of British academic

Matthew Hedges
- Born: 1986 or 1987 (age 38–39); Surrey, United Kingdom
- Occupation: Doctoral student
- Criminal charges: Espionage
- Penalty: 25 years of imprisonment followed by deportation (pardoned in November 2018)

Details
- Date apprehended: May 2018

In May 2018, Matthew Hedges, a British doctoral student who was in the United Arab Emirates for a two-week trip, was arrested at Dubai International Airport on suspicion of spying on behalf of the British government. In November 2018, Hedges was sentenced to 25 year of imprisonment followed by deportation in the United Arab Emirates on charges of espionage.

The verdict was criticised in the United Kingdom, including by Prime Minister Theresa May and Secretary of State for Foreign and Commonwealth Affairs Jeremy Hunt. Hedges was pardoned in November 2018 ahead of the United Arab Emirates's National Day after his family pleaded for a pardon.

Since his pardon, Hedges has lodged multiple lawsuits and criminal complaints against the British Foreign and Commonwealth Office and Emirati officials for allegations of wrongful imprisonment and torture.

== Biography ==
Hedges was born in Surrey, England, and attended Cranleigh School. He works for a British cyber intelligence company. He earned a bachelor's degree from the University of Bradford. He has an MA from the University of Exeter, for the thesis "What has driven the UAE's military spending since 2001?". In 2015, he began a PhD programme at Durham University's School of Government and International Affairs examining the effects of the Arab Spring on the Gulf states. He met his wife Daniela Tejada while at the University of Exeter.

Hedges had previously worked for a security and political consultancy firm in the UAE. Since January 2016 he has been an advisor for the U.S. geopolitical risk consulting firm Gulf State Analytics.

In March 2018, Hedges wrote an article for the Middle East Policy Council on the future of the Muslim Brotherhood and the Gulf Cooperation Council, and in April 2018 an article about the modernisation of the Royal Saudi Navy for Gulf State Analytics.

As of July 2021, Hedges was continuing his doctoral studies at Durham. As of January 2023, his studies have been completed.

== Arrest and imprisonment ==
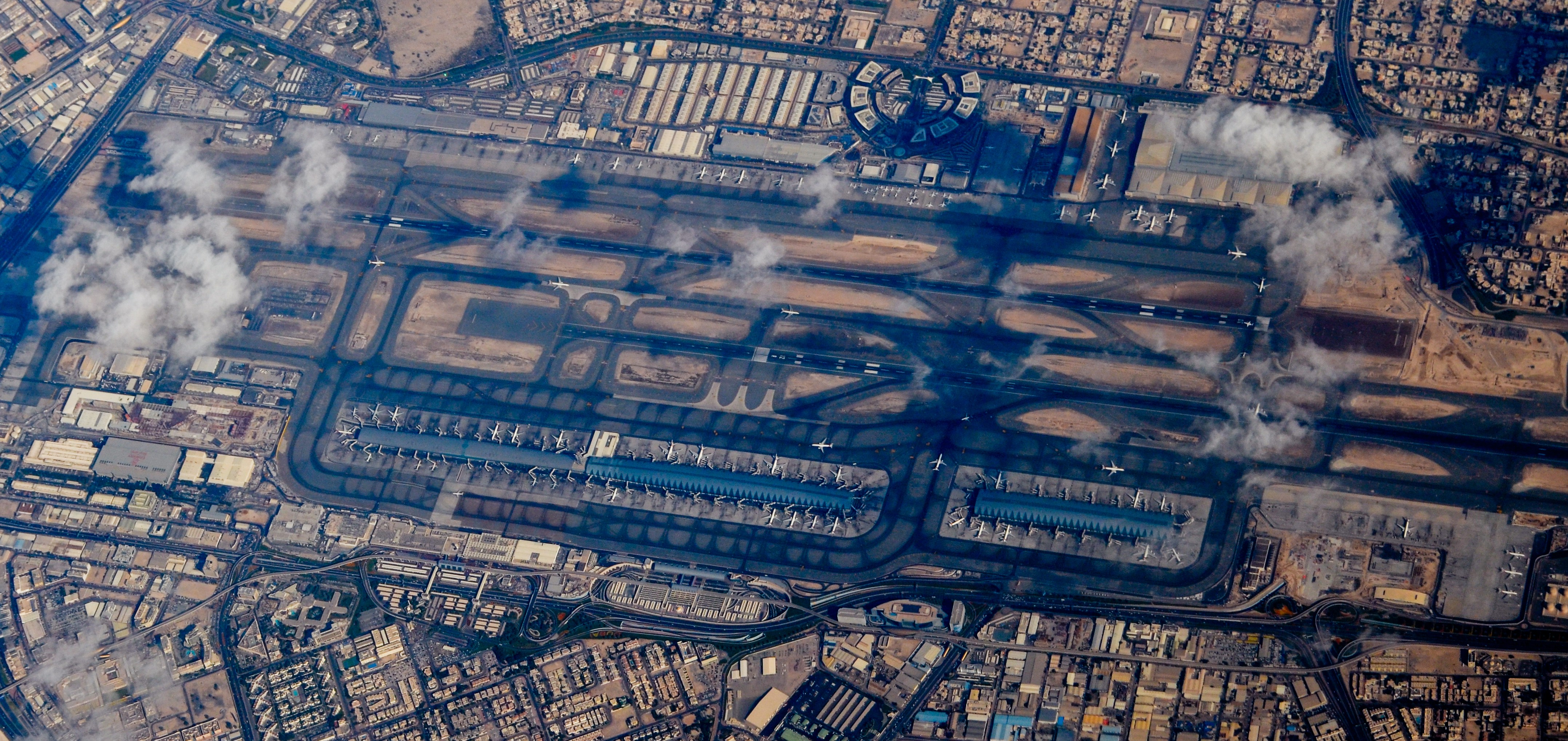
Dubai International Airport, where Hedges was arrested.

In April 2018, Hedges travelled to the United Arab Emirates (UAE) as part of a research trip for his PhD. He was conducting interviews for his thesis. At the end of his two-week visit, Hedges was arrested at Dubai International Airport on suspicion of spying on behalf of the British government. He was held for almost six months, mostly in solitary confinement.

According to his wife, in the first month of being detained, Hedges slept on the floor and had no access to a shower. The Emirates News Agency said that Hedges had access to medical care and that his detainment was compliant with Emirati law. According to Tejada, Hedges suffered from panic attacks while in jail. Hedges was only able to speak to his wife once a week.

In October 2018, a local report said that a foreign national, believed to be Hedges, had been accused of "seeking confidential information about the UAE", and said that the suspect had confessed to the charges. In the same month, Hedges was released on bail prior to the trial. In November 2018, Abu Dhabi court sentenced Hedges to life imprisonment in the UAE on charges of spying and providing confidential information to outside sources.

According to The National newspaper, a life sentence in the UAE consists of a maximum of 25 years in jail, followed by deportation for non-Emiratis. In accordance with Emirati law, Hedges was given 30 days to appeal the court ruling. According to Sulaiman Hamid al-Mazroui, the UAE ambassador to the United Kingdom, Hedges' family pleaded for a pardon.

=== Reactions ===
British Prime Minister Theresa May called the verdict "disappointing". British Secretary of State for Foreign and Commonwealth Affairs Jeremy Hunt criticized the verdict, claiming that it had been done in a five-minute hearing, an allegation denied by Sulaiman Hamid al-Mazroui. Non-governmental organisation Human Rights Watch said that the trial "was marred with such due process violations that there’s no way it could have been seen as a fair trial". Alex Younger, the head of MI6, said that he "couldn't understand how our Emirati partners came to the conclusions they came to."

After the verdict, the University of Birmingham voted to boycott its new campus in Dubai, in protest of the decision. Staff at Exeter University, where Hedges was previously an undergraduate, passed a motion calling for the suspension of its academic relationships with the UAE. Tejada set up an online petition which attracted over 200,000 signatures.

== Pardon and release ==
On 26 November 2018, Hedges was pardoned by UAE President Khalifa bin Zayed Al Nahyan, as part of the UAE tradition of pardoning people on the country's National Day.

After his release, Hedges went to the British embassy in Abu Dhabi, from where he later travelled back to the United Kingdom. He arrived at Heathrow Airport on the morning of Tuesday, 27 November 2018, where he was reunited with his wife, whom he praised for having tirelessly campaigned for his release. In December 2018, Hedges said that he was speaking to a specialist psychiatrist about the effects of his imprisonment.

== Claims for compensation ==
In May 2019, Hedges' lawyer lodged a complaint against the Foreign and Commonwealth Office alleging it failed in its duty of care to negotiate Hedges' release. Hedges and his wife also requested an independent inquiry. In August 2023, the British Parliamentary Ombudsman recommended that the Foreign, Commonwealth and Development Office apologise to Hedges for failing to protect him after his arrest and to pay him £1,500 in compensation.

In May 2021, Hedges also launched legal action against senior Emirati officials in relation to his alleged torture. He lodged a claim for compensation against four senior security officials for assault, false imprisonment and the intentional infliction of psychiatric injury during his detention. His claim was thrown out by the High Court of Justice in February 2024.

== Publications ==
- Hedges, M.J. & Cafiero, G. (2017). "The GCC and the Muslim Brotherhood: What Does the Future Hold?" Middle East Policy 24(1): 129–153.
