= UNIFOR =

UNIFOR may refer to:

- Unifor, a Canadian general trade union
- University of Fortaleza, Brazil
- Unit for Other Religions, an agency of the Government of Sarawak, Malaysia
