= Weimann =

Weimann is a German surname. Notable people with the surname include:

- Alexander Weimann (born 1965), German conductor and harpsichordist
- Andreas Weimann (born 1991), Austrian footballer
- Eugen Weimann, West German slalom canoeist
- Gisela Weimann (born 1943), German artist
- Gottfried Weimann (1907–1990), German javelin thrower
- Joachim Weimann (born 1956), German economist

== See also ==
- Weiman
