= Kim Tae-seong =

Kim Tae-seong or Kim Tae-sung (김태성) may refer to:

- Kim Tae-seong (composer), South Korean composer
- Kim Tae-seong (cinematographer), South Korean cinematographer
- Kim Tae-seong (footballer) (born 1993), South Korean football/soccer player
- Kim Tae-seung, South Korean politician
- Kim Tae-sung (footballer) (born 1997), South Korean football player
