= Thomas Tüting =

German dermatologist and researcher

Thomas Tüting (born 31 January 1962) is a German dermatologist and researcher at Otto von Guericke University Magdeburg. He is the clinical director of dermatology and the head of the Laboratory of Experimental Dermatology. His research interests include the identification and characterization of factors responsible for cancer progression and metastasis and resistance to cancer immunotherapy.

He obtained his medical doctorate in the Goethe University Frankfurt in 1993. He completed postdoctoral research at the University of Pittsburgh the United States from 1995 until 1997. He worked as a research scientist in Johannes Gutenberg University Mainz from 1998 until 2001 and as a professor of experimental dermatology in the University of Bonn from 2002 until 2015. He has been working as a clinical director and professor of experimental dermatology in the Otto von Guericke University Magdeburg since October 2015.

== Awards and Activities ==
- 2000 Memorial Prize of the Erich Hoffmann Society Bonn
- 2006 Translational Research Award of the AG Dermatological Research (with Dr. Gaffal)
- 2009 Steigleder-Award of the Dermatological Histology (with PD Dr. Wenzel)
- 2014 German Skin Cancer Award of the German Skin Cancer Foundation
- 2014 Arnold Rikli Prize of the Jörg Wolff Foundation
- 2015 Roche Posay Photodermatology Research Award
- 2013 - 2017 Member of the Board of the Dermatological Research Society (ADF)

== Sources ==
Universitätshautklinik - Klinikdirektor Prof. Dr.T.Tüting
