= Weiman =

Weiman is a surname. Notable people with the surname include:

- Blake Weiman (born 1995), American baseball player
- Duane Weiman (1946–2015), Canadian educator and political figure
- Rita Weiman (1885–1954), American playwright, journalist, author, and screenwriter
- Tyler Weiman (born 1984), Canadian ice hockey player

== See also ==
- Weimann
