= Axel Ockenfels =

German economist (born 1969)

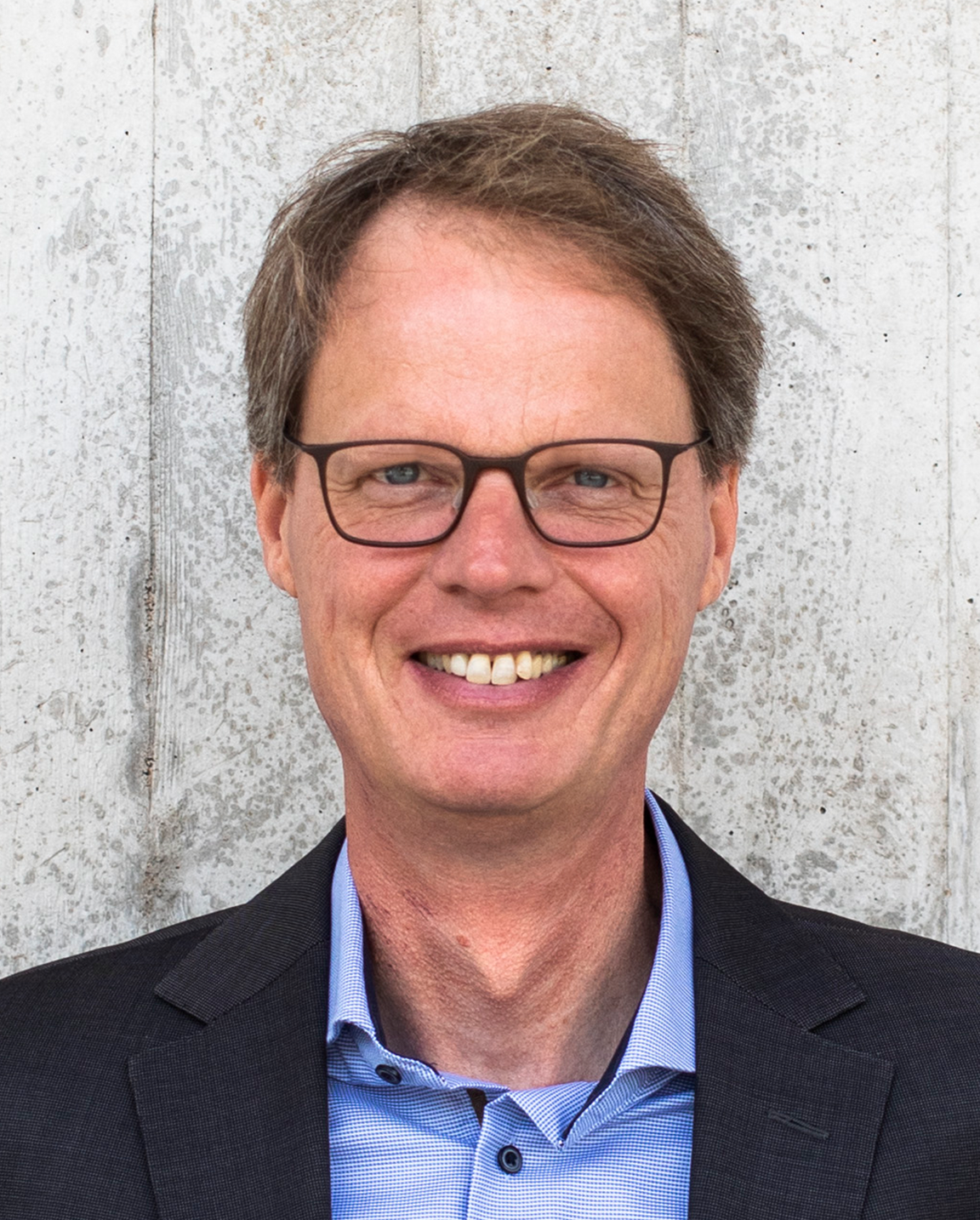
- Ockenfels in 2022
- Born: 9 February 1969 (age 57); Rheydt, North Rhine-Westphalia, Germany

Academic background
- Education: University of Bonn; Otto von Guericke University Magdeburg
- Thesis: Fairness, Reziprozität und Eigennutz: Ökonomische Theorie und experimentelle Evidenz (1998)
- Doctoral advisor: Joachim Weimann
- Other advisors: Reinhard Selten; Alvin E. Roth

Axel Ockenfels (born 9 February 1969) is a German economist. Since 2003, he has been professor of economics at the University of Cologne, and in 2023 he was appointed Director at the Max Planck Institute for Research on Collective Goods in Bonn. He is also founding director of the Adenauer School of Government.

== Life ==
From 1989 to 1994, Ockenfels studied economics at the University of Bonn. His diploma thesis was supervised by the Nobel Prize winner Reinhard Selten and won the Heinz Sauermann Prize in 1997. In 1998, he received his doctorate from the Otto von Guericke University Magdeburg under the supervision of Joachim Weimann. His thesis, entitled Fairneß, Reziprozität und Eigennutz (Fairness, Reciprocity and Selfishness), was awarded the prize of the Economic Science Association for the best dissertation in 1998/99. He subsequently received a number of other awards. From 2001 to 2007, he was an Emmy Noether Fellow at the German Research Foundation. After spending time abroad in 1996/97 as a DAAD Scholar at Penn State University, and as postdoc at Harvard University in 1999/2000, where he studied under the future Nobel Prize winner Alvin E. Roth, he qualified as Professor of Economics at the University of Magdeburg in 2002.

Until 2003, he worked as a research-group leader at the Max Planck Institute for Research into Economic Systems in Jena; in July 2003, the University of Cologne appointed him successor to Carl Christian von Weizsäcker as Professor of Economics. From 2003 to 2007, Ockenfels was Director of the Institute of Energy Economics at the University of Cologne. From 2003 bis 2006, he was President of the Gesellschaft für Experimentelle Wirtschaftsforschung. In 2004, he was the founding director of the Cologne Laboratory for Economic Research. Since 2010, Ockenfels has been a member of the Scientific Advisory Board at the Federal Ministry for Economic Affairs and Energy; from 2011 to 2018, he was spokesperson for the DFG research group "Design and Behavior – Economic Engineering of Firms and Markets"; and, after a visiting professorship at Stanford University, he headed the University of Cologne's Center of Excellence for Social and Economic Behavior (C-SEB) from 2015 to 2023. From 2018 to 2023, Ockenfels was Department Editor of the journal Management Science. Since 2018, he has been Head of the "Market Design & Behavior" research area within the ECONtribute Cluster of Excellence, together with economist Benny Moldovanu. After a visiting professorship at the University of California, San Diego, Ockenfels became Director of the Max Planck Institute for Research on Collective Goods in Bonn, alongside Christoph Engel and Matthias Sutter.

== Work ==
Ockenfels became known as a result of his research on game theory, behavioral economics and market design, and how these apply to business and politics.

In behavioral science, Ockenfels was a pioneer in economic models of fairness and experimental studies on intentionality He published one of the first studies in experimental economics to measure conditional cooperation and paternalism, as well as models of rational and boundedly rational behavior.

In terms of application, Ockenfels' research benefits from collaboration with governments, market platforms and companies. Examples include Ockenfels' early contributions to the design of eBay's auction platform and reputation mechanism, as well as the design of various markets and decision architectures in the areas of internet, electricity, climate, telecommunications, finance, transportation and other sectors, as well as in companies. A particular interest is the design of markets in times of crisis. Examples include the design of markets and interventions to secure vaccine supplies, prevent power outages, reduce energy consumption in times of crisis, incentivize climate action and increase organ donations and other life-saving donations, for example in the context of kidney cross donations.

Ockenfels is regarded as one of the leading German representatives of modern, empirically oriented economics. In an essay on the self-perception of modern economics in April 2007, Ockenfels wrote: "The subject has moved closer to people and their problems; it is increasingly succeeding in bridging the criticized gap between science and 'real life'. Data instead of dogma – this could be the leitmotif of modern economics."

Ockenfels is a proponent of a thesis that is becoming increasingly prevalent in economics, namely that the behavior of real people cannot be adequately represented by the standards of the theoretical economic model Homo oeconomicus.

Ockenfels addresses possible ways out of the climate crisis and calls for a solution at global level. He is in favor of CO_{2} pricing. As he once said: "Economists around the world rarely agree as much as they do on CO_{2} pricing. There is no better and no more effective instrument in the fight against climate change. But while it is traditionally pointed out that a carbon price achieves climate protection at minimal cost and stimulates innovation, there is an even more important reason: A carbon price facilitates international coordination and cooperation."

From the inception of the ranking in 2013 until 2021, he has been included in the Frankfurter Allgemeine Zeitung's ranking of the most influential economists in Germany every year.

== Awards and honors ==
On 2 March 2005, Ockenfels became the first economist in 17 years to be awarded the Gottfried-Wilhelm-Leibniz-Preis of the German Research Foundation for his research on the nature of economic motivation and interaction, as well as for his work on the optimal design of auction markets and other economic and social institutions. In the same year, he was named the best young German economist by the weekly magazine Wirtschaftswoche. In 2018, he was awarded the ERC Advanced Grant by the European Research Council. Other awards include the Philip Morris Research Prize (2007), the Gossen-Preis of the Verein für Socialpolitik (2006) and the Hans Kelsen Prize of the University of Cologne (2020). In 2022, he received the Exeter Prize for the best publication in Experimental Economics, Behavioral Economics and Decision Theory.

== Memberships ==
He has been member of the North Rhine Westphalian Academy of Sciences, Humanities and the Arts since 2005 and a member of the Berlin-Brandenburg Academy of Sciences and Humanities since 2006. Since 2010, Ockenfels has been a member of the Scientific Advisory Board of the Federal Ministry for Economic Affairs and Energy. In 2016 he became a member of the European Academy of Sciences, and in 2017 he was elected to the German Academy of Science and Engineering. In 2021, he was elected to the German National Academy of Sciences Leopoldina. Ockenfels has been a member of the Economists Panel since 2022 and of the Climate Economists Panel of the Federal Chancellery since 2023. He has been a member of the Scientific Working Group for Regulatory Issues of the Federal Network Agency since 2024.

== Selected Publications ==
- Dertwinkel-Kalt, Markus; Feldhaus, Christoph; Ockenfels, Axel; Sutter, Matthias (26 November 2024). "Household reduction of gas consumption in the energy crisis is not explained by individual economic incentives". Proceedings of the National Academy of Sciences. 121 (48) e2411740121. Bibcode:2024PNAS..12111740D. doi:10.1073/pnas.2411740121. PMC 11621823. PMID 39570308.
- Ashlagi, Itai; Cseh, Ágnes; Manlove, David; Ockenfels, Axel; Pettersson, William (29 August 2024). "Designing a kidney exchange program in Germany: simulations and recommendations". Central European Journal of Operations Research. doi:10.1007/s10100-024-00933-0. PMC 12479653.
- Gretschko, Vitali; Ockenfels, Axel (February 2023). "Empfehlungen für das Marktdesign zur Befüllung der Gasspeicher". Wirtschaftsdienst. 103 (2): 105–111. doi:10.2478/wd-2023-0032. hdl:10419/271695.
- Ambuehl, Sandro; Bernheim, B. Douglas; Ockenfels, Axel (March 2021). "What Motivates Paternalism? An Experimental Study". American Economic Review. 111 (3): 787–830. doi:10.1257/aer.20191039.
- Chen, Yan; Cramton, Peter; List, John A.; Ockenfels, Axel (September 2021). "Market Design, Human Behavior, and Management". Management Science. 67 (9): 5317–5348. doi:10.1287/mnsc.2020.3659.
- Cramton, Peter; Ockenfels, Axel; Roth, Alvin E.; Wilson, Robert B. (18 June 2020). "Borrow crisis tactics to get COVID-19 supplies to where they are needed". Nature. 582 (7812): 334–336. Bibcode:2020Natur.582..334C. doi:10.1038/d41586-020-01750-6. PMID 32528113.
- Cramton, Peter; Geddes, R. Richard; Ockenfels, Axel (2 August 2018). "Set road charges in real time to ease traffic". Nature. 560 (7716): 23–25. Bibcode:2018Natur.560...23C. doi:10.1038/d41586-018-05836-0. PMID 30065331.
- Global carbon pricing: The path to climate cooperation, eds. Peter Cramton, David J.C. MacKay, Axel Ockenfels, and Steven Stoft. (2017) MIT Press.
- Policy brief – translating the collective climate goal into a common commitment. Review of Environmental Economics and Policy, 11(1), (2017) 165–171 (with Peter Cramton and Jean Tirole)
- MacKay, David J. C.; Cramton, Peter; Ockenfels, Axel; Stoft, Steven (15 October 2015). "Price carbon — I will if you will". Nature. 526 (7573): 315–316. Bibcode:2015Natur.526..315M. doi:10.1038/526315a. PMID 26469025.
- Focusing climate negotiations on a uniform common commitment can promote cooperation. Proceedings of the National Academy of Sciences, 118(11) (with Klaus M. Schmidt).
- Similarity increases altruistic punishment in humans. Proceedings of the National Academy of Sciences, 110(48), 19318-19323 (with Thomas Mussweiler).
- Behavioral economic engineering. Journal of Economic Psychology, 33(3), (6/2012), 665–676 (with Gary E. Bolton).
- Bonus payments and reference point violations. Management Science, 61(7), 1496-1513 (with Dirk Sliwka and Peter Werner).
- Cramton, Peter; Ockenfels, Axel; Stoft, Steven (1 April 2013). "Capacity Market Fundamentals". Economics of Energy & Environmental Policy. 2 (2). doi:10.5547/2160-5890.2.2.2.
- Similarity increases altruistic punishment in humans. Proceedings of the National Academy of Sciences (PNAS), 110, (2013), 19318–19323 (with Thomas Mussweiler)
- Bolton, Gary; Greiner, Ben; Ockenfels, Axel (February 2013). "Engineering Trust: Reciprocity in the Production of Reputation Information". Management Science. 59 (2): 265–285. doi:10.1287/mnsc.1120.1609.
- Trust in everyday life. Journal of Personality and Social Psychology, 121(1), 95 (with A. Weiss, C. Michels, P. Burgmer, T. Mussweiler and W. Hofmann).
- Managers and students as newsvendors. Management Science, 58(12), (2012), 2225-2233 (with Gary E. Bolton and Ulrich Thonemann).
- The method of agencies coalition formation in experimental games. Proceedings of the National Academy of Sciences (PNAS), 109/50, (2012), 20358-20363 (with John F. Nash, Rosemarie Nagel and Reinhard Selten).
- Bolton, Gary E; Brandts, Jordi; Ockenfels, Axel (October 2005). "Fair Procedures: Evidence from Games Involving Lotteries". The Economic Journal. 115 (506): 1054–1076. doi:10.1111/j.1468-0297.2005.01032.x.
- How effective are electronic reputation mechanisms? An experimental investigation. Management Science, 50(11), (2004), 1587-1602 (with Gary E. Bolton and Elena Katok).
- Last-minute bidding and the rules for ending second-price auctions: Evidence from eBay and Amazon auctions on the internet. American Economic Review, 92 (4/2002), pp. 1093–1103 (with Alvin E. Roth).
- Bolton, Gary E; Ockenfels, Axel (March 2000). "ERC: A Theory of Equity, Reciprocity, and Competition". American Economic Review. 90 (1): 166–193. doi:10.1257/aer.90.1.166.
- Fairness, Reziprozität und Eigennutz: Ökonomische Theorie und experimentelle Evidenz. Dissertation 1999. Fakultät für Wirtschaftswissenschaft, Magdeburg. Die Einheit der Gesellschaftswissenschaften, 108. Tübingen: Mohr Siebeck ISBN 3-16-147205-5
- Selten, Reinhard; Ockenfels, Axel (March 1998). "An experimental solidarity game". Journal of Economic Behavior & Organization. 34 (4): 517–539. doi:10.1016/S0167-2681(97)00107-8.
