= Monika S. Schmid =

German linguist

Monika Schmid FAcSS FBA
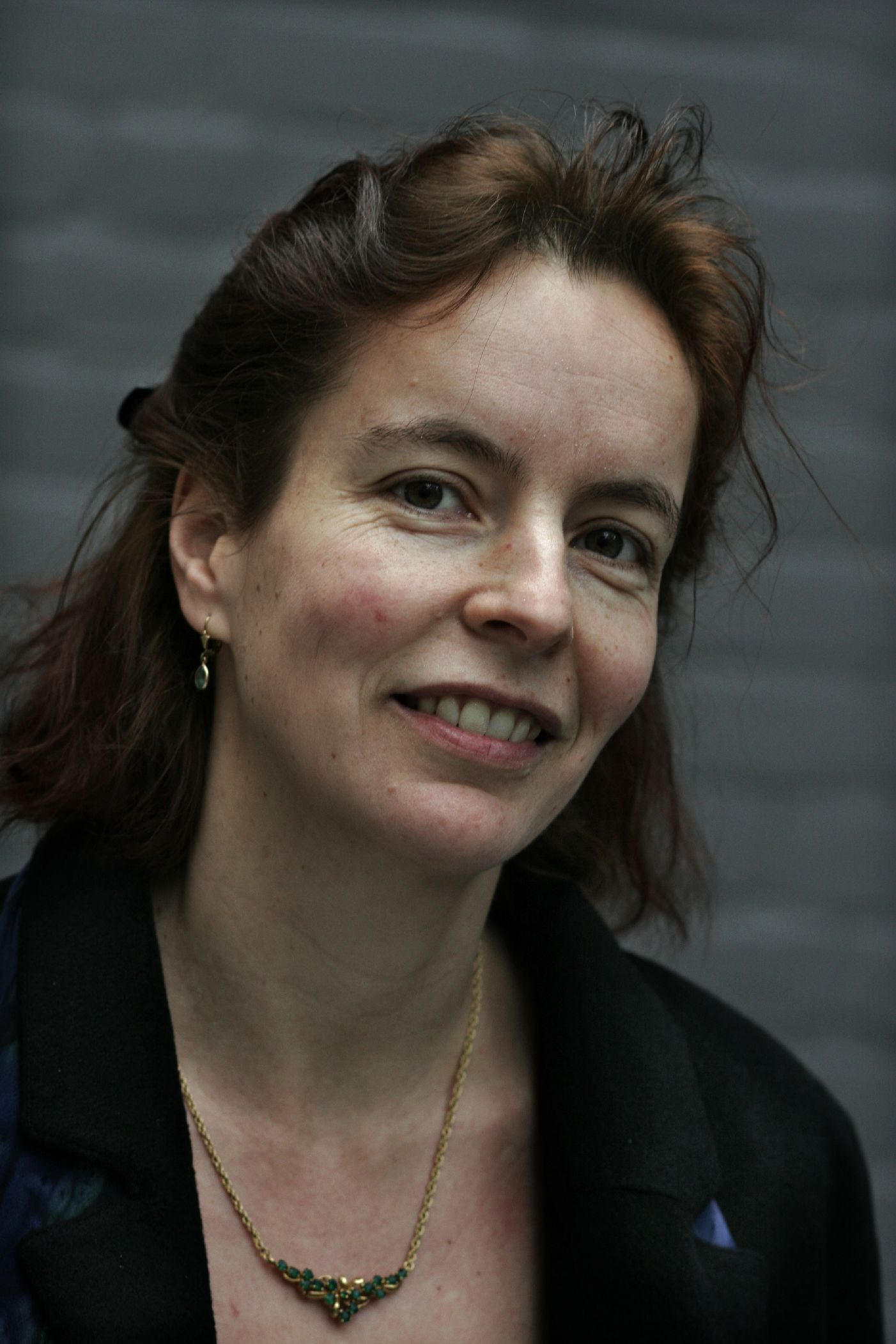
- Schmid in 2005
- Born: 1967 (age 58–59)
- Occupation: Linguist

Academic background
- Education: Heinrich Heine University Düsseldorf (PhD)

Academic work
- Discipline: Sociolinguistics
- Sub-discipline: Language attrition
- Institutions: Heinrich Heine University Düsseldorf; Vrije Universiteit Amsterdam; University of Groningen; University of Essex; University of York

Monika S. Schmid FAcSS FBA (born 1967) is a German linguist who specialises in language attrition. She is Professor of Linguistics at the University of York.

== Career ==
Monika Schmid began studying at Heinrich Heine University Düsseldorf (HHU) in 1990, where she was president of their student parliament. In 2000, she obtained her Doctor of Philosophy in English Linguistics from HHU, with her thesis on language attrition based on a corpus of oral history interviews with German-Jewish Holocaust survivors collected by the local Holocaust memorial centre.

She began working as a Lecturer in English Language at Vrije Universiteit Amsterdam. She worked as a lecturer at HHU from 1996 to 2001. In 2007, she moved to the University of Groningen English Department, where she was Senior Lecturer in English Language until her promotion to Professor in 2010. At the University of Essex, she became Professor of Linguistics in 2013 and Head of the Department in 2018, both positions she held until 2021. She moved to the University of York in January 2022, where she became a professor, was Head of the Department of Language and Linguistic Science from 2022 to 2026.

== Research ==
Schmid specialises in "bilingual development and, in particular, on change, deterioration and stability in the native language of migrants who become dominant in the language of the environment", that it is to say (first) language attrition.

In 2002, she published First Language Attrition, Use and Maintenance, a book based on her thesis. In the book, she concludes that the main cause of German-language attrition within German Jewish Holocaust survivors is Holocaust trauma.

She has created and maintained a webpage about Language Attrition. The webpage contains not just theoretical and practical information about the topic, but also information about calls, grants. It is the starting point of the Language Attrition Network (LAN), a Network that promotes collaboration among attrition researchers. One of the main activities is the LAN Reading Group.

In 2012, she published Language Attrition, and has subsequently published dozens of papers, participated, and edited several volumes about linguistics research in general (i.e. Designing Research on Bilingual Development), and Language Attrition in particular. Worthy of mention is The Oxford Handbook of Language Attrition reviewed by The Linguist List.

She has organized, chaired and facilitated several conferences, meetings, and seminars bringing together researchers in the field of Language Attrition. She regularly advises early career researchers, as part of the Language Attrition Seminar Series between 2014 and 2018, and the IV International Conference on Language Attrition and Bilingualism in 2022.

== In the media ==
Schmid has contributed to BBC News, the Berliner Zeitung, The Conversation, The Guardian, Svenska Dagbladet, and de Volkskrant, either as an author or as a quoted expert. She has collaborated in different podcasts, radio programs, and many more formats.

== Honors ==
Schmid was elected Fellow of the Academy of Social Sciences in 2021. She was elected Fellow of the British Academy in 2022.
