= Joachim Weimann =

German economist

- Born: February 14, 1956 (age 70); Düsseldorf

Academic background
- Education: University of Dortmund; Bielefeld University
- Influences: Wolfram Richter

Academic work
- Discipline: Political economics, Environmental economics
- Institutions: Otto-von-Guericke University Magdeburg
- Website: Information at IDEAS / RePEc

Joachim Weimann (born February 14, 1956) is a German economist. He is currently the chair for Economic Policy at the Otto-von-Guericke University Magdeburg. Weimann's research interests include environmental economics and behavioral economics.

== Career ==
Born in Düsseldorf, Northrhine-Westphalia, Weimann attended Bielefeld University. He earned his doctoral degree in 1987, and his Habilitation in 1992, both from the University of Dortmund. In 1994 he was offered a professorship at the University of Magdeburg. Among his doctorate students was Axel Ockenfels.

== Other activities ==
- Verein für Socialpolitik, Member
- Wirtschaftsdienst, Member of the Scientific Advisory Board
