= Song Yoo-geun =

South Korean person (born 1997)

Song Yoo Geun 송유근
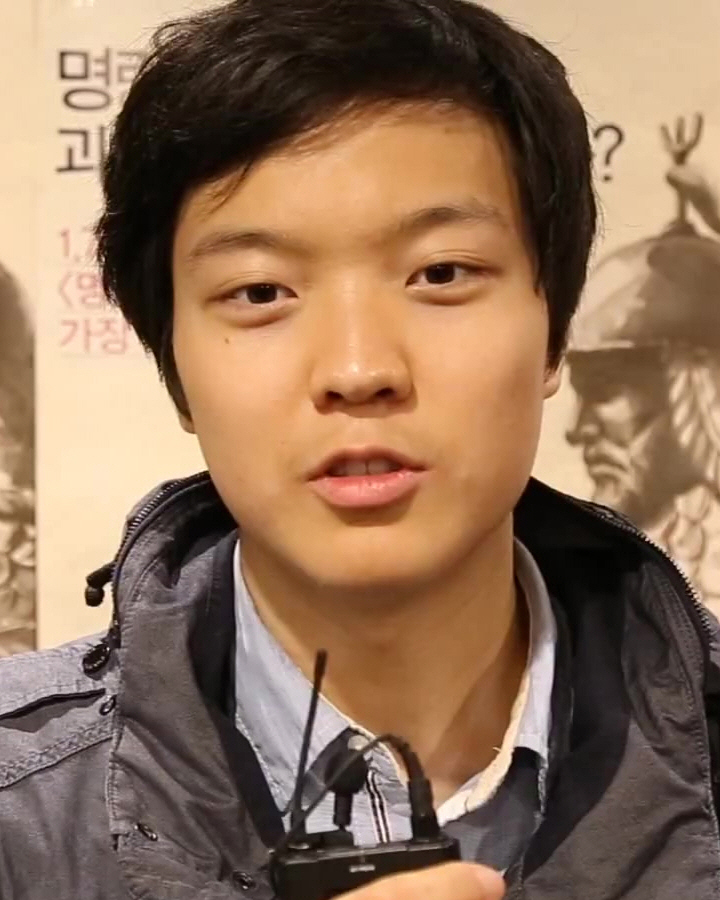
- Born: November 27, 1997 (age 28); Guri, Gyeonggi Province; South Korea
- Education: Korean University of Science and Technology (UST; Ph.D. candidate, did not finish); Inha University (dropped out)
- Known for: The youngest South Korean Ph.D. candidate

Song Yoo-geun (born November 27, 1997) is a South Korean person who gained recognition as a child prodigy in South Korea since 2004. After graduating college in 2009, he was involved in a number of controversies during his ultimately unsuccessful doctorate program at Korean University of Science and Technology (UST), including one involving his paper in October 2015 written with his advisor, Park Seok-jae. The paper, entitled "Axisymmetric, Nonstationary Black Hole Magnetospheres: Revisited" appeared in the Astrophysical Journal (ApJ). However, the paper was soon retracted due to concerns that it plagiarized a 2002 book chapter.

== Life before October 2015 ==
Song Yoo-geun left a prodigy school he attended in 2003. Six months of independent study enabled him to solve pre-calculus problems. In August 2004, at age 6, he passed the "Craftsman Information Processing" (정보처리기능사) certification examination. In November of the same year, his parents tried to enroll him at a local elementary school (Shim Seok Elementary School; 심석초등학교) as a sixth grader. While Song did not perform well, obtaining a score of 12% on his math exam, his parents maintained that Song was neither used to, or interested in, calculating equations that lacked meaning. Although the school allowed this at first, it later reversed its decision, citing administrative difficulties. Song's parents took the elementary school to court, where the court ruled that the school's decision was unlawful in April 2005, allowing Song to study there as a sixth grader.

As Korean students must enroll in middle school within 30 days of the beginning of the school year, Song could not enroll in middle school even after winning the lawsuit. Song's parents decided to opt for a Korean equivalent of the GED. Song passed the test, which gave him the right to enroll in high school in May 2005. He then went on to pass the test that certified him as a high school graduate in August 2005. Thus, Song finished the twelve-year curriculum spanning elementary school – middle school – high school in nine months, setting a new record.

In October 2005, he applied and was accepted to Inha University through its early decision plans, which allow exceptional students to bypass the Korean equivalent of SATs, at age 7, making him the youngest university student ever. During his interview with Inha University, Song demonstrated his understanding of the Schrödinger equation, a partial differential equation which is of central importance to quantum mechanics theory. Considering his young age, Inha University formed a committee of seven, named "Song Yoo-Geun Committee," including professors and his mother, who gave him private lessons instead of the usual classroom style lectures. Inha University also provided Song with his own lab, and a residence space, so that he can stay with his parents, at his parents' request. His first semester GPA was 3.8/4.5, approximately equivalent to a B+. However, In December 2008, a mere two years after he had begun his studies, he decided to withdraw from Inha University, since he felt it was "difficult to study within the framework that the professors have arbitrarily decided for themselves." He said, "I want to study string theory or big bang theory, but I cannot do that as an undergraduate student." Of the 140 credits required for graduation, Song received 53 credits from Inha University, and 113 credits from an on-line degree institution. On this, Inha University said, that it "respects Song's decisions." To fulfill the total credit hours to apply to a graduate school, he achieved a Bachelor's degree using the Credit Bank System.

He began at UST as a master's student in February 2009, with the intention of studying astronomy. Like Inha University, UST formed a committee of professors, titled "Song Yoo-Geun Project," and Song was given private lessons in lieu of classroom lectures. The topics of the lectures included quantum field theory, nuclear physics, astronomy, and topology. The university set aside 100 million Korean won (approximately US$80,000) for Song's classes and research. In February 2010, UST announced that Song had been accepted to its combined master's and Ph.D. program, with the goal of obtaining a Ph.D. in 2012.

He studied under the guidance of Park Seok-jae, whose specialized area is black hole modeling. He passed his candidacy exam in November 2014, by a presentation entitled "Gromov-Witten Invariants on Real Hypersurfaces of Kähler Manifold," and declared his intention to become a mathematician to the press. However, he again changed his mind to study black holes.

== Controversy ==
=== Air purification system controversy ===
During a press conference in 2005, after he was admitted to Inha University, he brought a machine that purifies air, and gave a demonstration of it. The press and the Inha University officials reported that Song claimed it to be a machine that he invented himself, to thank the Korean citizens for their support. It became known later that the machine was in fact designed by a small company. According to the CEO of JC Technologies, Song's father told him that being able to show off the machine in front of the press would help with its sales, and he had borrowed the machine from the company. Song's father quickly admitted this misunderstanding, saying that "Song has ambitions to study air purification methods using photosynthesis, so he just did a demonstration. There may have been parts where we were misunderstood, as this was our first large-scale press conference."

=== Plagiarism controversy ===
In 2015, The Astrophysical Journal (ApJ) retracted Song's paper due to a plagiarism issue. ApJ noticed that the paper plagiarized a 2002 book chapter, which had originally been a paper published by Song's advisor, Park Seok-jae.

Song & Park (2015) draws extensively from an earlier publication by Park, "Stationary Versus Nonstationary Force-Free Black Hole Magnetospheres," in Black Hole Astrophysics 2002: Proceedings of the Sixth APCTP Winter School (World Scientific Publishing Co., 2002). In fact, the differences are modest, mostly confined to an alternate formulation of the analytic results, and could raise the question of copyright violation. Park (2002) is not part of the peer-reviewed literature, and scientists frequently use a conference proceeding as the rough draft of a subsequent submission to a professional peer-reviewed journal. However, in this case the overlap between the 2002 book chapter and 2015 paper is exceptionally large.

— The American Astronomical Society, Astrophysical Journal Paper Retracted for Plagiarism

"This article by Yoo Geun Song & Seok Jae Park has been retracted at the request of the Editor-in-Chief due to an unacceptably large overlap with "Stationary Versus Nonstationary Force-Free Black Hole Magnetospheres," published in Black Hole Astrophysics 2002: Proceedings of the Sixth APCTP Winter School (World Scientific Publishing Co., 2002). Please see https://aas.org/posts/news/2015/11/astrophysical-journal-paper-retracted-plagiarism for a more complete explanation."

— Astrophysical Journal, RETRACTION: "AXISYMMETRIC, NONSTATIONARY BLACK HOLE MAGNETOSPHERES: REVISITED"

Park first denied the plagiarism controversy towards Song, insisting he will "resign his position if any part of his paper is found unoriginal." He also argued that Song's work on partial differential equation is totally of Song, and is worthy to be a "meaningful contribution as a doctoral student." Against the argument that several parts of Song's paper appeared to overlap Park's proceeding in 2002, Park said that the proceeding is conventionally not considered as an 'official' paper, so citing the proceeding paper is not a requirement nor an offence against academic integrity or research ethics.

UST took disciplinary actions against Park and Song where Park was dismissed as a professor from UST and Song was subjected to 2 weeks suspension.

=== Doctorate degree ===
As UST requires one published paper in a journal listed in the Science Citation Index as a graduation requirement, the retracted article would have qualified Song to apply for a Ph.D. degree. He published another paper and held his defense in June 2018, but did not pass it. UST policy allows 9 years for doctorate students so he was let out of the program in September 2018, and he filed for an injunction to stop this move in December 2018, at which time he enlisted in the Korean army. But his request was denied by the court in July 2019, thus making him officially no longer a student at UST.
