= Valdecy Urquiza =

Brazilian police officer (born 1981)

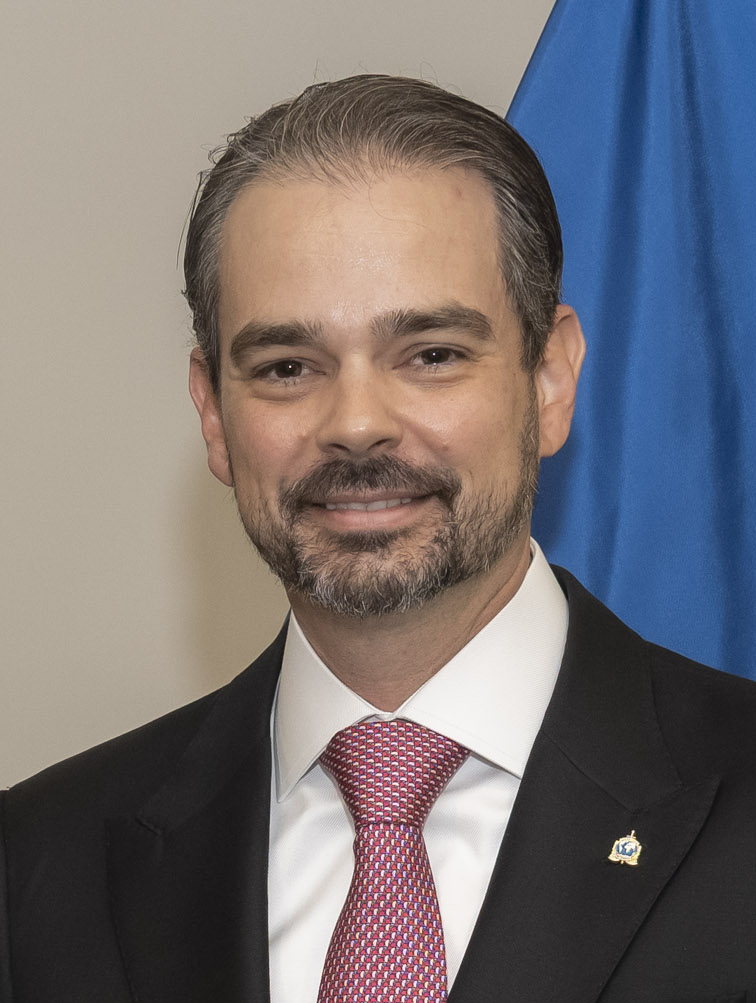
- Urquiza in 2025

9th Secretary General of Interpol
- Incumbent
- Assumed office November 7, 2024
- President: Ahmed Naser Al-Raisi; Lucas Philippe
- Preceded by: Jürgen Stock

Personal details
- Born: 1981 (age 44–45) São Luís, Maranhão, Brazil
- Education: University of Fortaleza; Pontifical Catholic University of São Paulo; IBMEC; FBI National Academy

Valdecy de Urquiza e Silva Junior (born 1981) is a Brazilian police officer and member of the Federal Police of Brazil serving as the secretary-general of Interpol since November 7, 2024. He was elected by the general assembly of Interpol as secretary general on 5 November 2024 to succeed Jürgen Stock. Urquiza is the first non-European/American person to be appointed as chief of Interpol since its foundation in 1923.

== Biography ==
Urquiza was born in São Luís, in the state of Maranhão and graduated in law from the University of Fortaleza, and has MBA degrees in strategic sustainability management from the Pontifical Catholic University of São Paulo and in public administration from Ibmec. Additionally, Urquiza graduated from the FBI National Academy leadership program. He joined the Brazilian Federal Police in 2004 through a public exam.

== Interpol ==
From 2015 to 2018, Urquiza served as the head of Interpol's national bureau in Brazil, during which time he represented the country on various regional police bodies, including Europol and Ameripol. In 2021, Urquiza was elected by Interpol as vice-president for the Americas by the executive committee.

== Honours ==
- Brazil:
  - Grand Officer of the Order of Rio Branco (G.O.R.B.) (2025)
