= Global U8 Consortium =

- 全球八校联盟 (Chinese)
- Abbreviation: GU8
- Formation: 2004; 22 years ago
- Purpose: To meet a growing demand for cross-cultural education, enhanced interdisciplinary research and strengthening global co-operation among university administration functions
- Headquarters: China
- Location: Xiamen
- Members: 8 Universities: Xiamen University; Universiti Malaysia Perlis; University of Hull; Inha University; University of Le Havre; Otto von Guericke University Magdeburg; University of Fortaleza; University of Haifa
- Website: guc8.org

Chinese name
- Simplified Chinese: 全球八校联盟
- Traditional Chinese: 全球八校聯盟
Transcriptions
Standard Mandarin
- Hanyu Pinyin: Quánqiú Baxiào Liánméng

The Global U8 Consortium, abbreviated as GU8, is the organizational body that includes 8 universities from United Kingdom, China, Malaysia, South Korea, France, Germany, Brazil and Israel. It is a unique model of global collaboration between prestigious higher education institutions located in coastal cities.

GU8 Consortium focuses on three main areas:

- Developing a joint education system, which may feature complementary curricula, distance learning (such as internet-based e-classes), credit transfers and joint degrees.
- Conducting joint programmes of research and innovation.
- Building administrative capacity.

== List of member institutions ==
Institution	Country
Xiamen University	China
Universiti Malaysia Perlis	Malaysia
University of Hull	United Kingdom
Inha University	South Korea
University of Le Havre	France
Otto von Guericke University Magdeburg	Germany
University of Fortaleza	Brazil
University of Haifa	Israel
