= Günter Theißen =

German geneticist

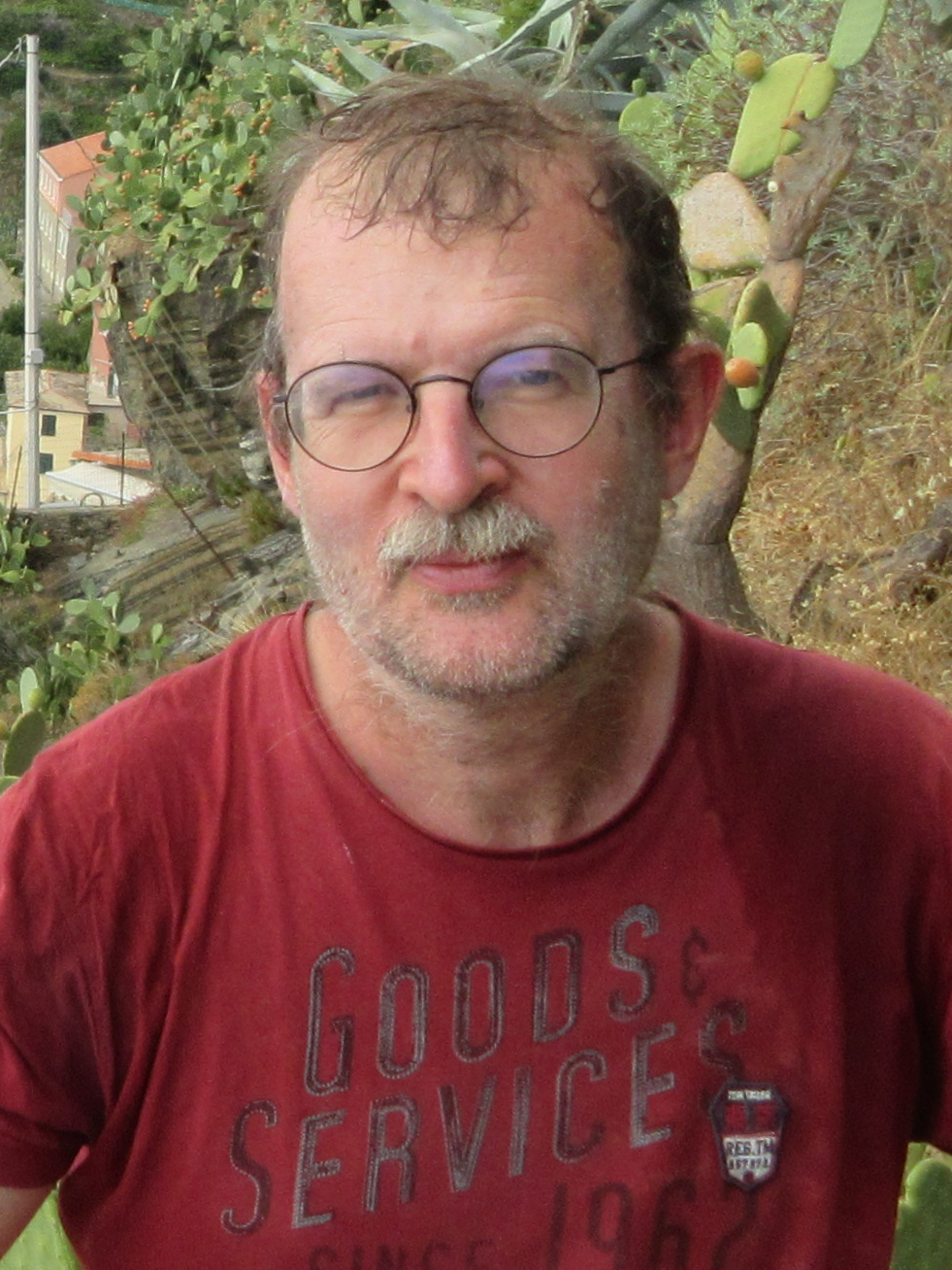
Theißen in 2015

Günter Theißen (born 16 January 1962 in Mönchengladbach) is a German geneticist. He holds the chair of genetics at the University of Jena.

== Life ==
Theißen studied biology at the University of Düsseldorf and did his PhD in 1991 with Rolf Wagner at that university. From 1992 to 2001, he was a group leader at the Max Planck Institute for Plant Breeding Research in Cologne. He did his second doctorate (Habilitation) at the University of Cologne in 2000. In 2001, he was appointed professor at the University of Münster. In 2002, he was appointed to hold the chair of genetics at the University of Jena.

== Scientific work ==
In his research, Theißen deals, among other things, with molecular genetics and evolution of plant development. In particular, he and his group investigate special transcription factors encoded by MADS-box genes.
