= Heinrich Heine University Düsseldorf =

Public university in North Rhine-Westphalia, Germany

- Heinrich-Heine-Universität Düsseldorf
- Motto: Life. Nature. Society
- Type: Public
- Established: 1965
- Budget: €279 million
- Rector: Anja Steinbeck
- Academic staff: 2,252
- Administrative staff: 1,403
- Students: 36,569
- Location: Düsseldorf, North Rhine-Westphalia, Germany; 51°11′25″N 6°47′39″E
- Campus: 321 acres (130 ha); Urban
- Website: uni-duesseldorf.de

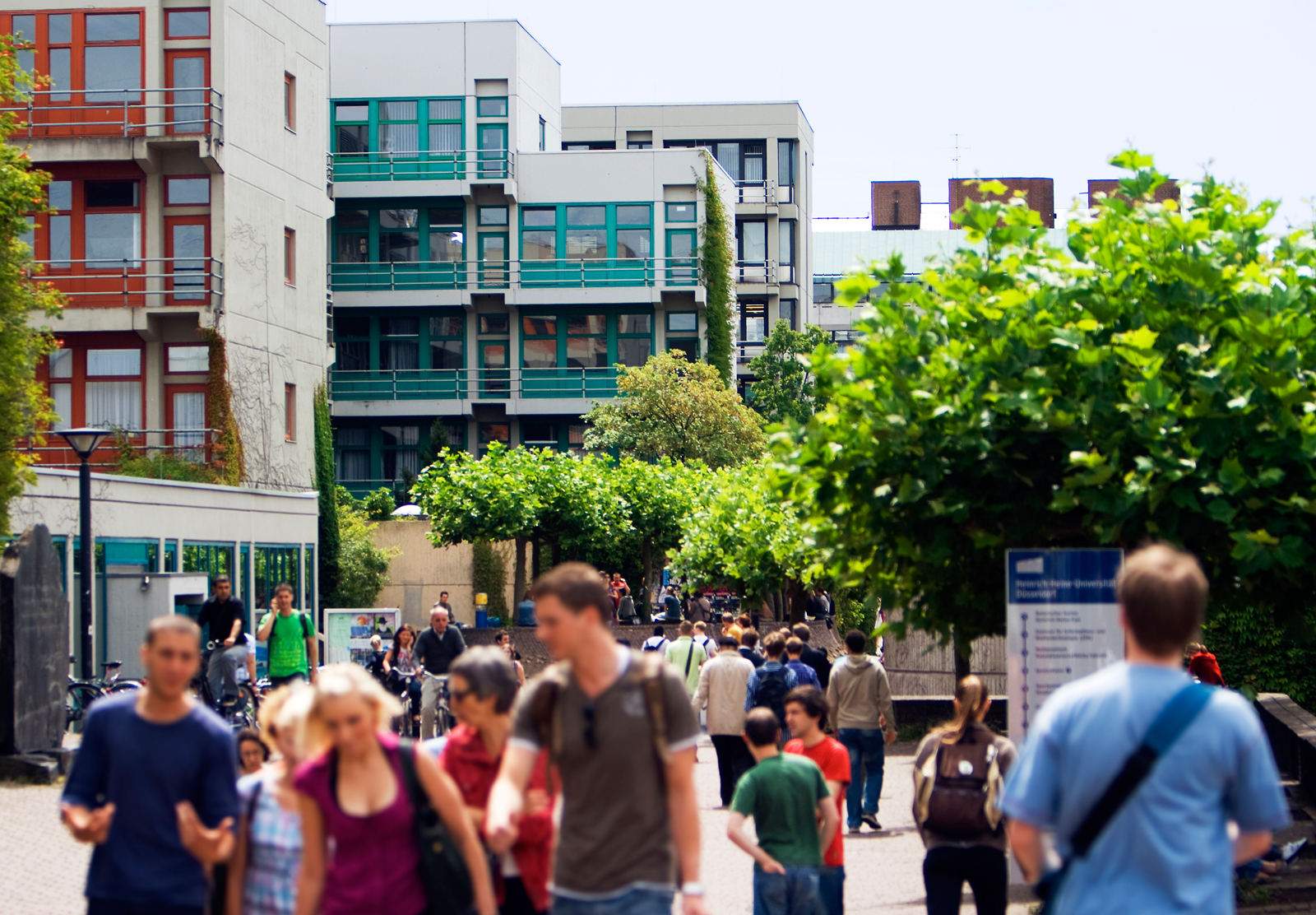
Main pedestrian route

Heinrich Heine University Düsseldorf (abbr. HHU; German: Heinrich-Heine-Universität Düsseldorf), named after German poet Heinrich Heine, is a public university in North Rhine-Westphalia, Germany, which was founded in 1965. It is the successor organization to Düsseldorf's Medical Academy of 1907.

Following several expansions throughout the decades, the university has comprised five faculties since 1993. Currently, more than 36,000 full-time students are studying at HHU, and the total staff is approximately 3,600 (academic and non-academic).

== History ==
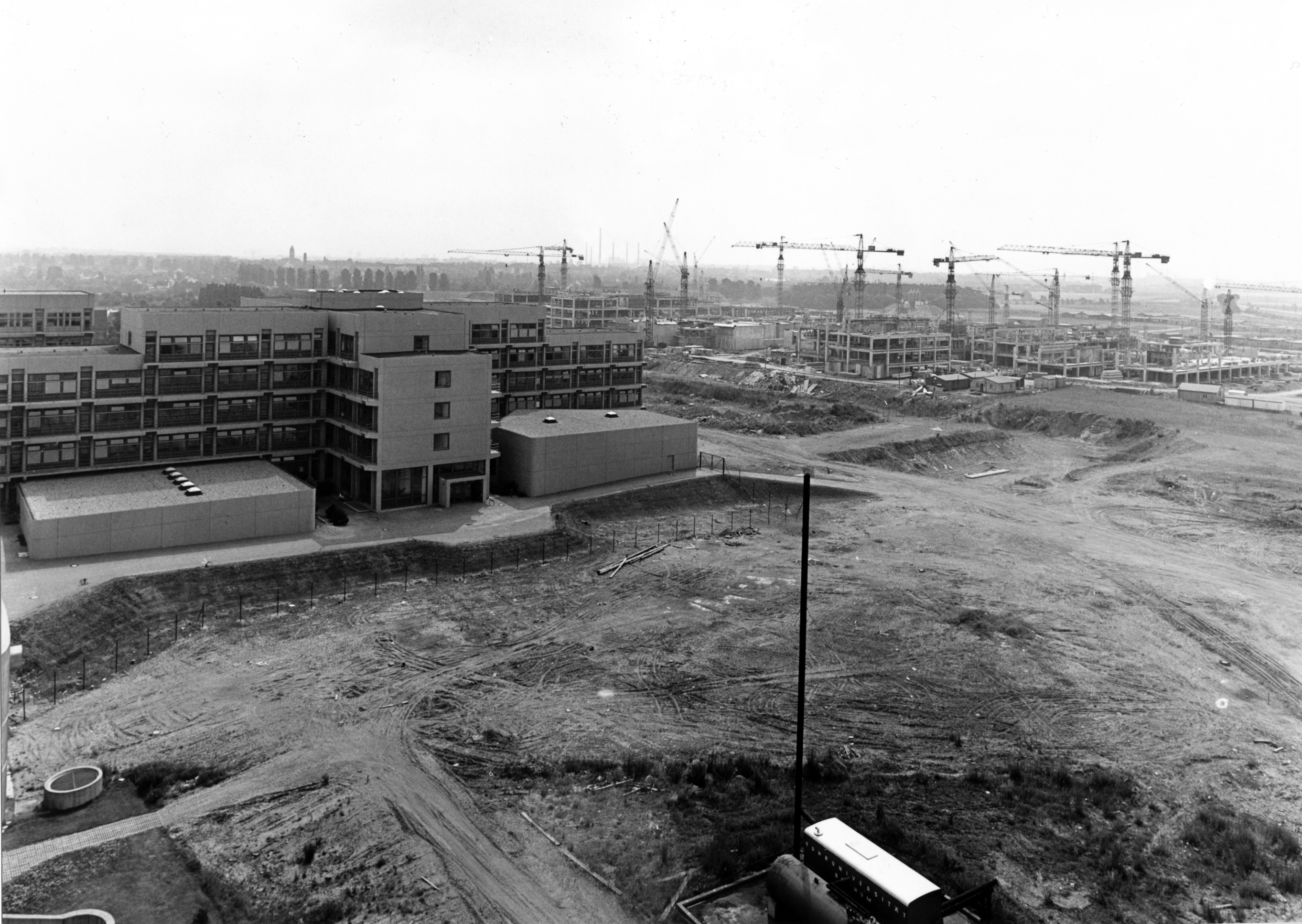
Facilities of the Faculty of Arts and Humanities. The background to the right shows construction works of the Faculty of Mathematics and Natural Sciences (around 1973).

Düsseldorf University began with the Düsseldorf Academy for Practical Medicine in 1907. The city's first real university, however, was founded only in 1965 by adding a combined Faculty of Natural Sciences–Arts and Humanities to the existing medical faculty. Only four years later, the university split the combined faculty into two bodies, creating the Faculty of Arts and Humanities and the Faculty of Mathematics and Natural Sciences. In 1979, a modern University and State Library was opened to the public, and a sports centre was added in 1980/81. Following a quarrel of more than 23 years, the "nameless" university of Düsseldorf was finally christened after the poet Heinrich Heine, one of Düsseldorf's most famous sons, in 1989. From this period on, the campus university has been opening up towards the city and its citizens. Heinrich Heine University's Faculty of Business Administration and Economics opened in 1990, and the Faculty of Law opened in 1993.

== Campus and grounds ==
HHU's roughly triangular campus is located in the southeast of Düsseldorf, in the Bilk district. To the north, it borders the university hospital campus with which it forms a unit. Together, the two campuses cover approximately 1,300,000 square metres (circa 130 hectares).

New sections, such as the Student Service Center (SSC), have been added to existing parts of the campus. Already completed are the new Oeconomicum building (Faculty of Business Administration and Economics) and the new O.A.S.E. library (medical literature) – the latter one of Germany's most up-to-date structures for individual study and group work.

=== University and State Library (ULB) Düsseldorf ===
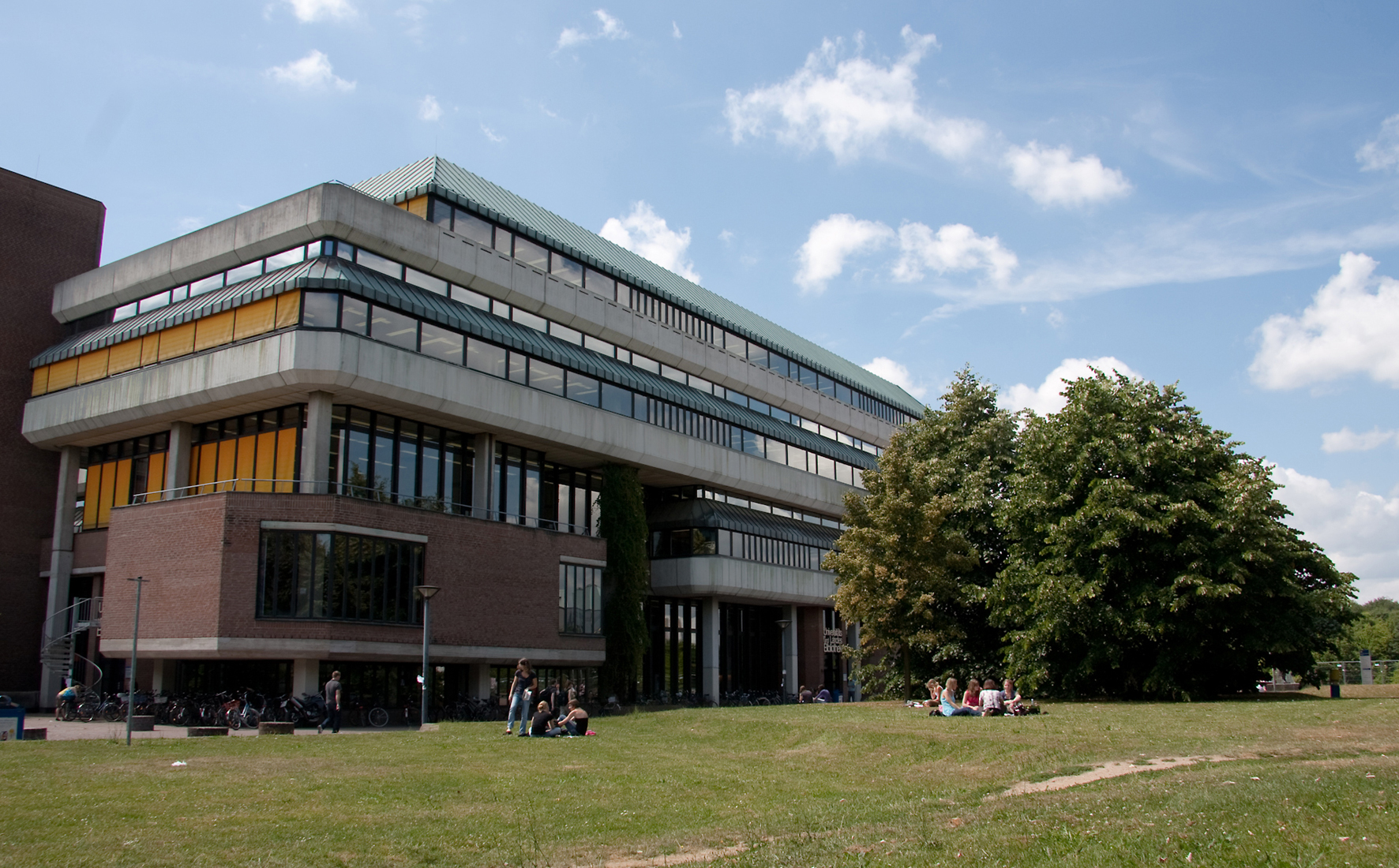
University and State Library Düsseldorf

The ULB Düsseldorf is one of three state libraries in North Rhine-Westphalia and one of Germany's innovation leaders in the library sector due to its high service standards and the volume of its collections In its university library function, it collects, archives and cares for scientific resources. In its state library function, it does likewise for regional literature.

=== Centre for Information and Media Technology (ZIM) ===
As a central unit and (multi) media centre of HHU, the ZIM provides competencies and services in the field of digital information delivery and processing. Further fields of activity are digital communication and digital media.

=== Botanical Garden ===
The Botanical Garden of Düsseldorf is a scientific institution of HHU that cultivates about 6,000 plant species from around the globe. It is open to visitors throughout the whole year.

== Faculties ==
=== Medicine ===
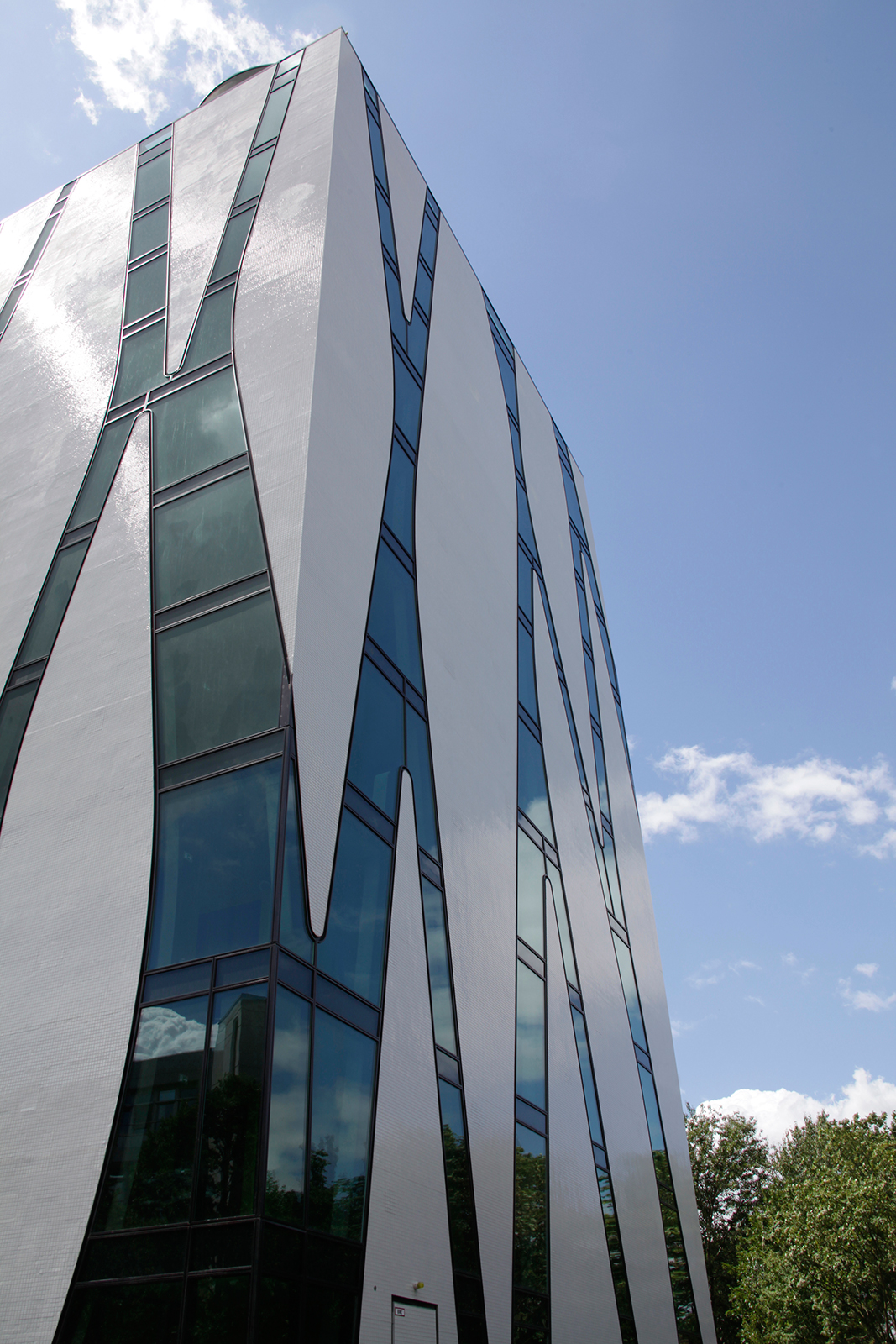
The O.A.S.E (German pronunciation: [oˈaː.zə] – "Ort des Austauschs, des Studiums und der Entwicklung" – platform of exchange, study and development – also the acronym Oase translates to oasis) encompasses the library for medical literature and constitutes the centre for studying and learning of the Faculty of Medicine.

With more than 3,000 students in the winter semester 2011/12, the Medical Faculty is HHU's third largest unit. Study offers range from Medicine and Dentistry (state examination) through Toxicology (MSc) to Public Health and Endocrinology (both MSc, further education). Graduate studies have been institutionalised in the form of the faculty-wide Medical Research School Düsseldorf, which offers networking, services and counselling for both graduate students and their supervisors. Further structured doctorate support is provided by research training groups in neurosciences (RTG 1033, iBrain), in hepatology (research training in CRC 974) and in tumor research (Düsseldorf School of Oncology DSO). Research hubs with a significant volume of third-party founded collaborative projects are hepatology (CRC 974 and Research Unit 217), cardiovascular research, neurosciences, surgery (Research Unit 1585), infectiology and immunology (Research Unit 729), and diabetes and metabolism research. The Biomedical Research Centre (BMFZ), the Leibniz-Institute for Environmental Medicine (IUF), the C. and O. Vogt Institute for Brain Research, and the German Diabetes Centre (DDZ) are important organisations that form the local research environment.

=== Arts and Humanities ===
About 8,000 students (winter semester 2011/12) in currently 26 B.A. and M.A. programmes make the Faculty of Arts and Humanities HHU's largest unit. It offers the prestigious M.A. in European Studies, a unique one-year English-taught course especially designed for exceptional graduates from universities in Israel, Palestine and Jordan. Recently, the program became increasingly popular with graduates from other regions globally. The German-French master programme Media Culture Analysis / Analyse de Pratiques Culturelles, enables students to obtain a double diploma of both the HHU and the University of Nantes. At the doctoral level, the academy of the Faculty of Arts and Humanities, PhilGrad, offers a broad range of counselling and career-relevant courses. Further support for structured doctorates is provided by programmes in the history of art (RTG 1678), in linguistics (research training in CRC 991), in ageing-related studies, and in democracy research (Link.De), as well as within two German-Italian programmes (Interculturality and Communication, "Doctor Europaeus"). Among the research hubs in the faculty are linguistics (CRC 991), politics (Research Unit 1381), ancient history (funded by the NRW Academy for the Arts and Sciences), the history of art, and editing studies (complete works editions of Max Weber and Martin Buber in progress). Beyond that, the Faculty of Arts and Humanities contributes to HHU's Institute of German and International Party Law and Party Research (PRuF).

=== Mathematics and Natural Sciences ===
HHU's second-largest faculty offers approximately 6,500 students (winter semester 2011/12) ten basic programmes (B.A. and state examination) and nine graduate programmes (MSc). Special programmes such as the four-year "bachelor plus", in which students spend one year at Michigan State University in East Lansing or at the University of Western Australia in Perth, and the international MSc in Biology enable students to gain international experience. The faculty has institutionalised support for doctoral studies through iGRAD, the Interdisciplinary Graduate and Research Academy Düsseldorf, to establish network structures and offer counselling and training services for doctoral students, supervisors, and research training groups. Further backing for structured doctorates provide the following programmes: RTG 1203 Dynamics in Hot Plasms (DFG), Graduate Cluster CLIB, NRW Research Academy Biostruct, RTG "Molecules of Infection" (Manchot Foundation), the international graduate school iGRAD-Plant in collaboration with the Forschungszentrum Jülich and Michigan State University, US; and the internally funded initiatives vivid, e-norm, and iGRASPseed. Research hubs with a significant volume of third-party founded collaborative projects are biology (Cluster of Excellence on Plant Sciences CEPLAS) and physics (CRC-TR 6, CRC-TR 18). The Biomedical Research Center (BMFZ) and the Bioeconomy Science Center (a cluster of 54 departments of the universities of Aachen, Bonn, and Düsseldorf, as well as the Forschungszentrum Jülich) are important organisations forming the local research environment.

=== Business Administration and Economics ===
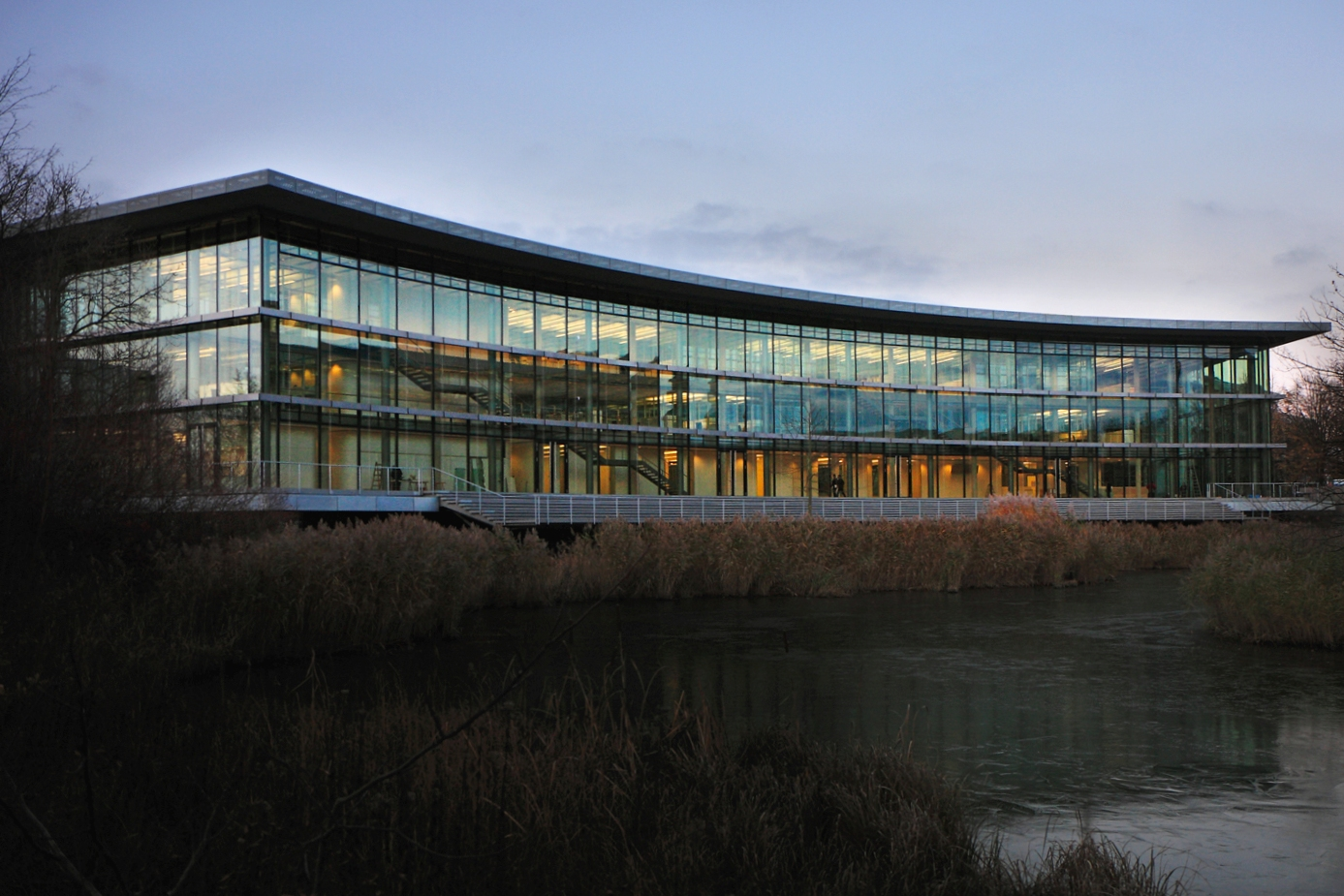
The Oeconomicum is home to the Faculty of Business Administration and Economics.

One of HHU's smaller faculties, the Faculty of Business Administration and Economics, attracted about 1,100 students in the winter semester 2011/12. The faculty is housed in the futuristic Oeconomicum building and offers Business Administration (BSc and MSc), Economics (BSc and MSc), and Business Chemistry (BSc and MSc, in cooperation with the Faculty of Mathematics and Natural Sciences). Further education is provided by the Düsseldorf Business School (DBS), which offers MBA programmes for a tuition fee. Examples include General Management MBAs (in German and English) and Health Management (in cooperation with the Health Care Academy Düsseldorf). A major research hub in economics is competition economics, funded through the DFG ANR Project and centred in the Düsseldorf Institute for Competition Economics (DICE). Business studies focus on finance, accounting, management, and marketing.

=== Law ===
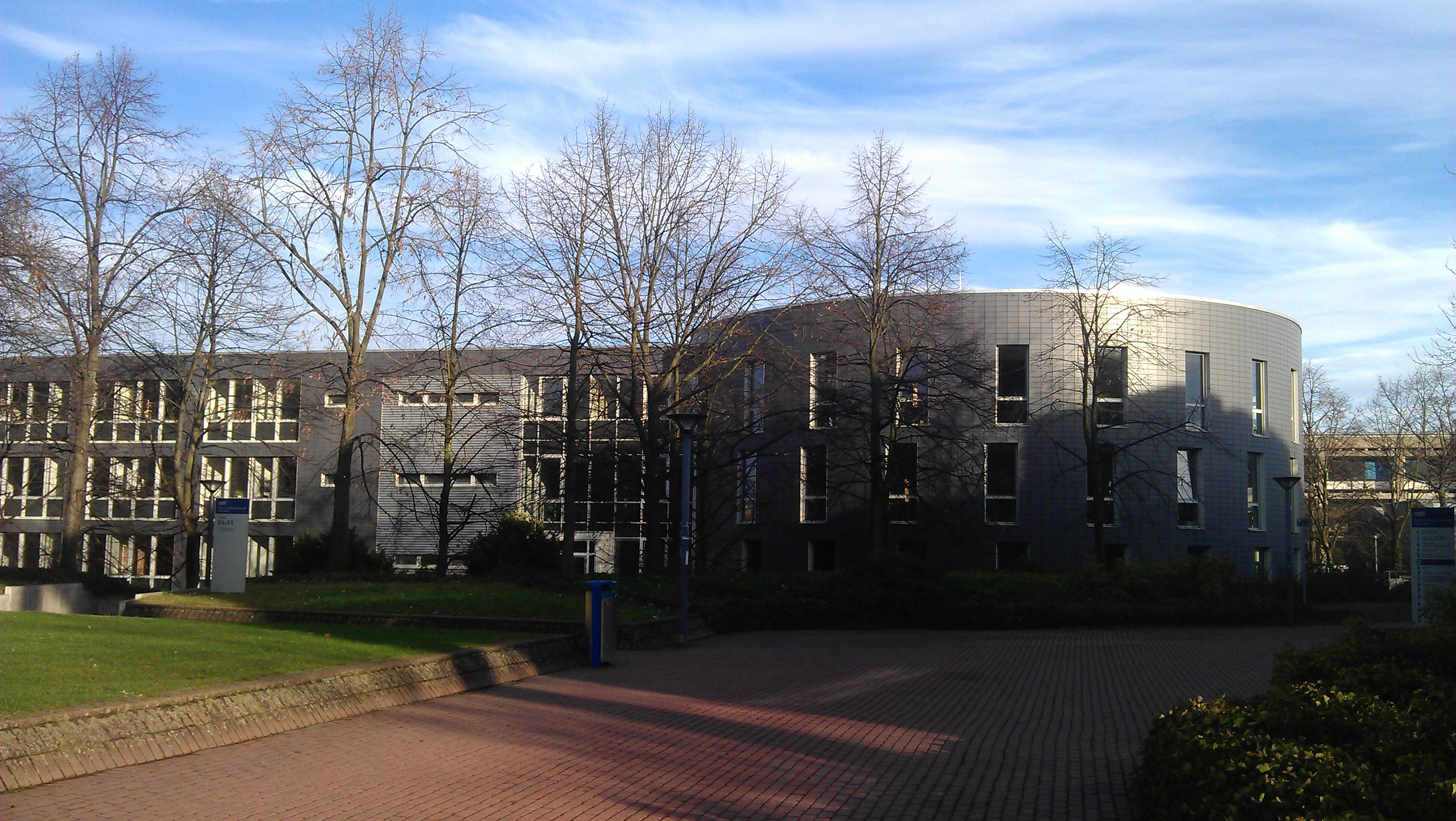
Building of the Faculty of Law: the Juridicum.

The Faculty of Law offers practice-oriented courses for the state examination in law in cooperation with various local institutions (e.g., courts such as the Appeal Court, District Court, and Fiscal Court).

Beyond that, a specialty is a German-French law course organized in collaboration with the University of Cergy-Pontoise near Paris, which has, since 2005, annually admitted 15 German and 15 French law students to study both legal systems. Graduates of this three year law course are awarded the German legal "Zwischenprüfung" (German LL.B. equivalent) as well as the French "licence mention droit" (French LL.B. equivalent). Since 2008, the universities offer a subsequent two-year course whose participants specialize in business, labor as well as employment law and graduate with the French "Master 2 mention droit de l'entreprise" (French J.D. equivalent). Subsequently, they are also eligible for the German state examination in law (German J.D. equivalent) and for an admission exam with a French attorney's law school (École de formation de barreau – EFB).

Another speciality is an extra-curricular qualification in Anglo-American law.

Further education is provided by Düsseldorf Law School (DLS), which offers postgraduate master's programs in the protection of commercial, information, and medical rights for a tuition fee. Research focuses on commercial law, European law and international law. Hubs are the Centre for Information and Technology Law (ZfI), the Centre for Medical Law (IMR), the Insurance Law Institute, and the Institute of German and International Party Law and Party Research (PRuF).

== Governance ==
=== The President's Office ===
Heinrich Heine University Düsseldorf is a public corporation of the Land of North Rhine-Westphalia. Its degree of autonomy from state ministries and other legal bodies is defined in the Higher Education Autonomy Act (HFG) of 31 October 2006. The rectorate (also known as the president's office; see HFG §15) manages the university. Its members are the president, four vice-presidents and the chancellor. From October 2008 to 2014, the president was Professor Michael Piper, a physiologist. Since November 2014, Professor Anja Steinbeck has been the president of the HHU.

=== The University Council ===
The University Council consists of three internal and five external members. It gives advice to the president's office and supervises their administration of university business (§21,3 HFG). The first University Council was inaugurated in October 2007. Current chairperson of the council is Anne-José Paulsen, a judge and president of the Appeal Court of Düsseldorf (Oberlandesgericht Düsseldorf).

=== The Senate ===
The Senate is the central democratic organ for discussions between the university's various status groups. The university public elects its representatives. Further senate members are the chancellor and the president. University law grants the senate the authority to confirm elected members of the rectorate in office. Furthermore, it can give "recommendations and statements" concerning the university's development. To a certain extent, statements have a binding character for the President's Office.

=== Faculty council ===
Each faculty council represents the interests of the various status groups within a faculty. It elects a dean as the head of faculty management (Dean's Office). Deans represent a faculty and its interests to the president's office.

=== Student representation ===
The student parliament is the highest plenary organ of all matriculated students at HHU. The central representative of student life and the voice of students' demands in university politics is the AStA (Allgemeiner Studierendenausschuss). One student association for each academic subject represents students' interests within the university community.

=== Central Administration ===
The central administration has five departments: student affairs, academic management, personnel and organisation, finance, and facility management. It is the backbone of the university in terms of formal structures and governance processes. The chancellor is the head of approximately 340 administrative staff. Furthermore, the chancellor's three staff offices are responsible for legal advisory, work safety, environmental protection, and internal audit. Current tasks for the university administration include implementing a campus management system and renovating and improving campus infrastructure.

=== National ===
In 2012, HHU and its partner institutions – the University of Cologne, the Max Planck Institute for Plant Breeding Research, and Forschungszentrum Jülich – received a grant for the Cluster of Excellence CEPLAS in the Excellence Initiative of the German Federal and State Governments.

=== International ===
HHU is currently involved in 23 international projects funded within the EU's Seventh Framework Programme. 11 further international projects have just ended. Twelve HHU researchers at the Faculty of Mathematics and Natural Sciences currently have the prestigious ERC Grants.

=== A culture of entrepreneurship ===
HHU promotes research- and knowledge-based start-ups. Its concept to strengthen an entrepreneurial culture at and around HHU was successful in the EXIST competition of the Federal Ministry of Economics and Technology (Germany).

== International profile ==
=== International study programmes and doctoral studies ===
At present five degree programmes at HHU are taught in English: The Faculty of Arts and Humanities offers English Studies (B.A.), Comparative Studies in English and American Literature (M.A.) and European Studies (M.A.); furthermore, an International MSc in biology and an English-language MSc in Physics address students at the Faculty of Mathematics and Natural Sciences. International doctoral research programmes are available in the "Faculties" section.

=== International partners in higher education ===
Key regions of HHU's internationalisation activities are Europe, United States, Japan and the Near East. At the moment, there are 13 collaborations at university level, 80 collaborations in research or teaching at faculty or institute level, and over 140 Erasmus partnerships.

== Student life ==
The Student Service Centre (SSC) offers counselling and services.

Sports are coordinated by the students' representation (AStA) of Düsseldorf's four higher education institutions in a joint initiative. On offer are about 100 kinds of sports, workshops and sports holidays. Once a year, the four AStAs organise a common sports day.

Musical initiatives include the AStA's Local Heroes event, a platform for local bands, and jam sessions. There is also a semi-professional university orchestra. Once a year, the short film competition for young talents from the region takes place on campus. There are various (student) associations, clubs, networks, and societies. Examples are the local UNICEF group, a debating club, the European Student Network, and the campus radio.

Since 1989, the Heinrich Heine Guest Lecture has repeatedly drawn high-profile speakers to the university's campus. These guest professors usually deliver a short series of lectures to the general public on topics that are currently in the public eye. Speakers have included, for example, Marcel Reich-Ranicki, Helmut Schmidt and Joschka Fischer. New traditions have come to supplement the guest lecture: since 2010, the "University Speech" and since 2011, the "Heinrich Heine Professorship for Business and Economics", both delivered by external speakers of high calibre.

=== Study fees and scholarships ===
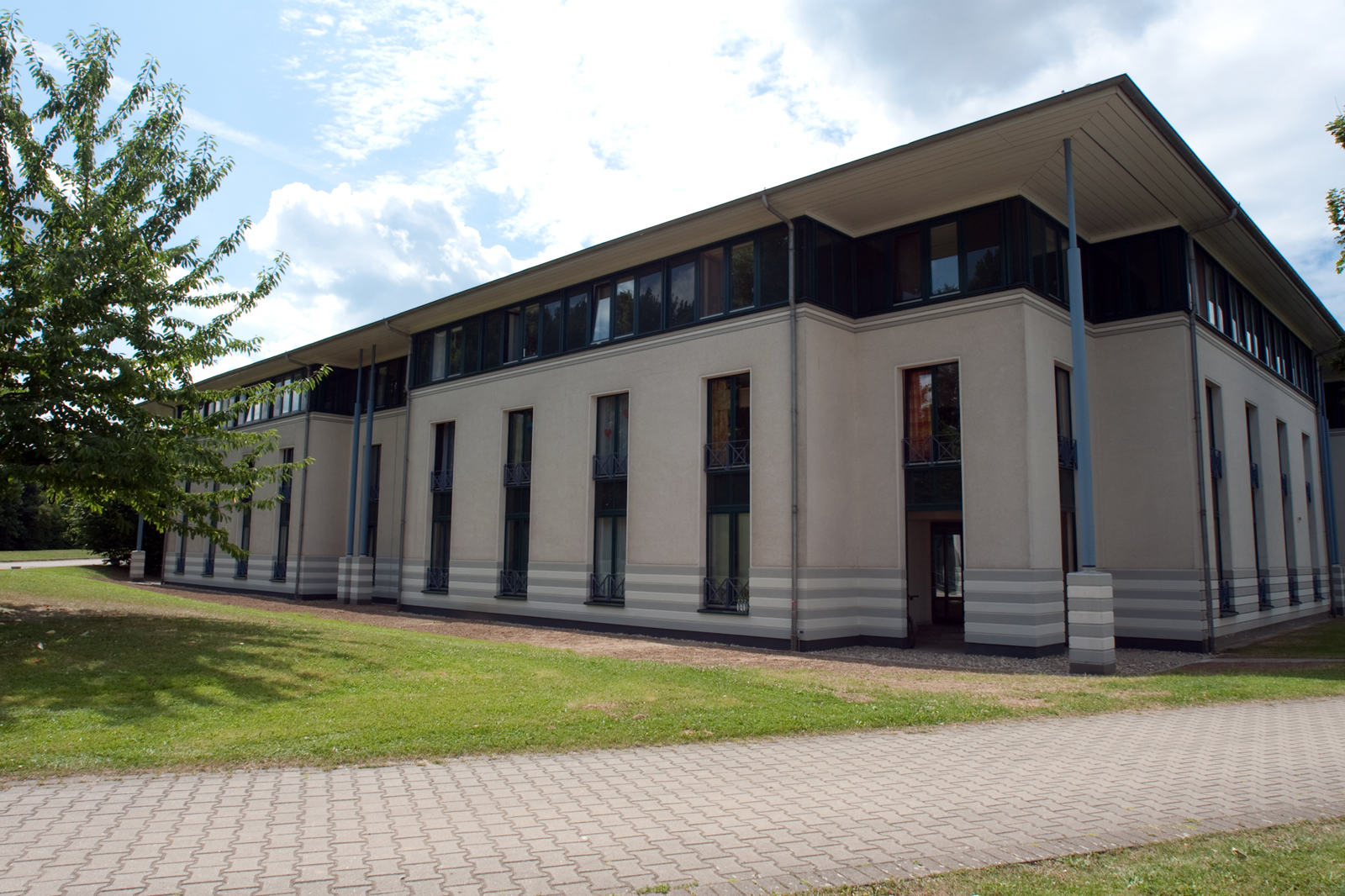
Student housing on campus (established in 1992).

As a German public university, HHU receives funding from the Land of North Rhine-Westphalia and therefore does not charge tuition fees. However, a service charge of currently about 230 Euros per semester (winter semester 2012/13) has become necessary to cover the expenses of the AStA, of student services such as housing and canteen organisation (Studentenwerk), and the semester ticket for free rides on all local trains and buses. Various scholarships are available to cover specific student expenses and/or needs. For example, there are bursary programmes to cover living costs, facilitate stays abroad, or to finish one's final thesis. Within the National Scholarship Programme at German universities, for example, HHU currently ranks among the top 5 providers of scholarships.

== Notable alumni ==
- Patty Gurdy (born 1997), hurdy-gurdy musician, singer, songwriter, and YouTuber
- Moritz Körner (born 1990), politician of the Free Democratic Party, Member of the European Parliament
- Johann-Mattis List (born 1981), scientist
- Heino Meyer-Bahlburg (born 1940), psychologist
- Peter Philipp (1971–2014), writer and comedian
- Bernhard Sabel (born 1957), neuropsychologist and brain researcher
- Monika S. Schmid (born 1967), linguist
- Günter Theißen (born 1962), geneticist
- Larisa Velić (born 1973), Judge of the Constitutional Court of Bosnia and Herzegovina

== Rankings ==
University rankings

Overall – Global & National
QS World 2024	801–850	43
THE World 2024	251–300	25–31
ARWU World 2023	301–400	20–24

According to the 2024 QS World University Rankings, the university ranks in the 801–850 tier globally, placing it 43rd nationally. In the 2024 THE World University Rankings, it is ranked in the 251–300 range internationally, positioning it between 25th and 31st within the nation. Further, the 2023 ARWU World University Rankings places the university within the 301–400 global bracket, translating to a national ranking between 20th and 24th.
