= Bernhard Sabel =

German psychologist and professor

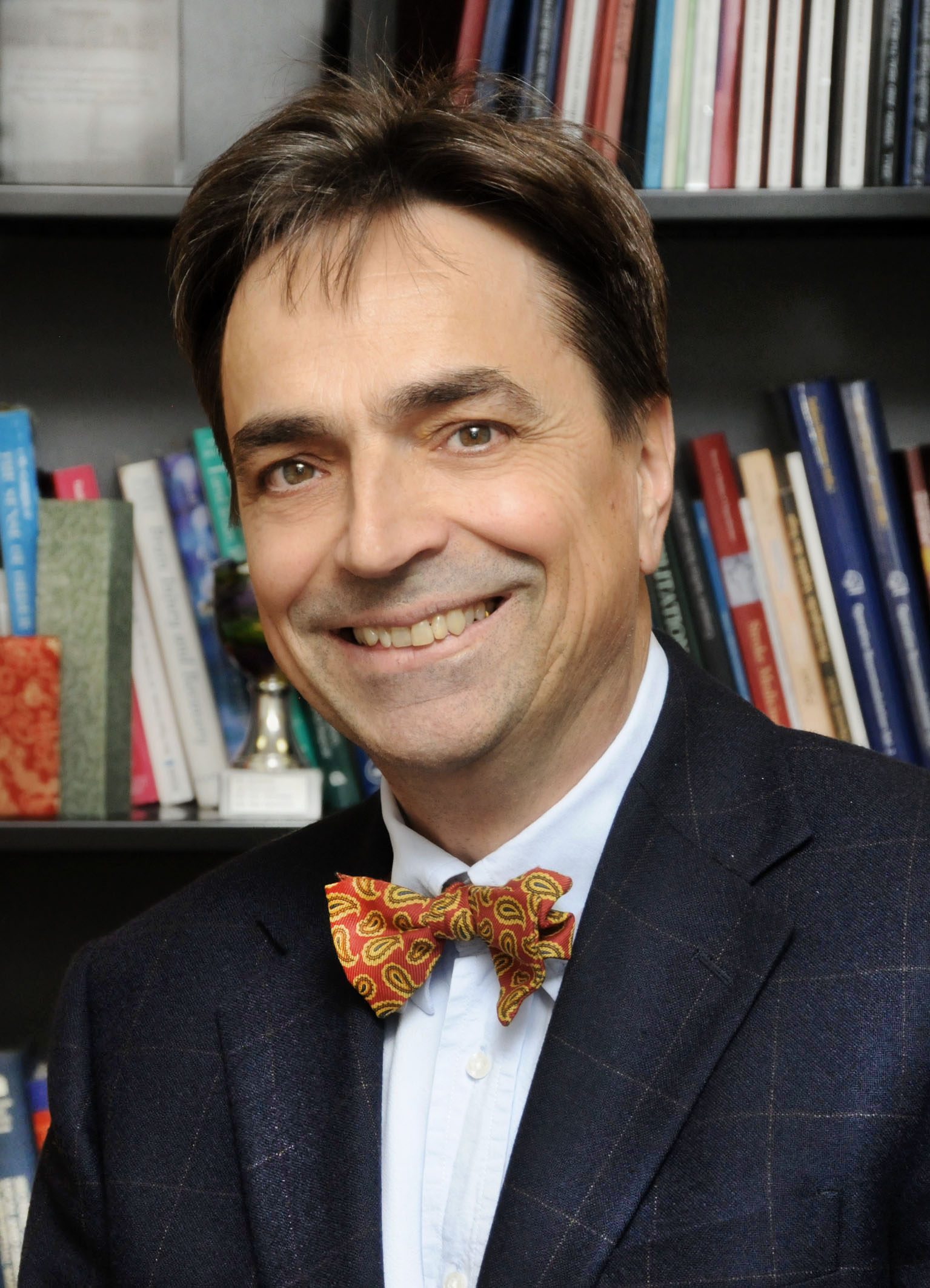
Bernhard Sabel

Bernhard Sabel (born 1957) is a German neuropsychologist and brain researcher. His more than 40 years of research are documented in over 200 publications, investigating treatment options for visual impairments through the activation and rehabilitation of residual vision capabilities.

Until September 2023, Sabel headed the Institute of Medical Psychology at Otto-von-Guericke University Magdeburg and now serves as a clinical consultant for the Savir Center in Magdeburg.

== Personal life ==
Bernhard Sabel studied psychology at the University of Trier, the Heinrich Heine University Düsseldorf, and at Clark University in Worcester, Massachusetts (USA).

In 1984, he earned his doctorate and, following a postdoc at the Massachusetts Institute of Technology (MIT) in the United States, he became a research fellow at the Institute of Medical Psychology at LMU Munich.

In 1988, he completed his habilitation under Ernst Pöppel, and in 1991, he served as a Visiting Neuroscientist at Harvard Medical School in Boston.

Since 1992, Sabel held the Chair of Medical Psychology at Otto-von-Guericke University of Magdeburg and retired in September 2023. During this time, he was a visiting professor at Princeton University (USA), Emory University (USA), the Chinese Academy of Sciences, and Capital Medical University in Beijing (China).

From 1997-2023 Sabel was editor of the international scientific journal "Restorative Neurology and Neuroscience" (IOS Press, now SAGE). From 2008 to 2010, he was Vice-President for Research & Technology at Otto-von-Guericke University of Magdeburg.

In 2019, he was elected Chairman of the German Association of University Professors and Lecturers (DHV), State Association Saxony-Anhalt. . From 2010-2025, Sabel was a member of the Board of Governors of the International Brain Injury Association (IBIA), and from 2011 to 2023, he served on the board of the "International Society for Low Vision Research and Rehabilitation (ISLRR) in various capacities (Exec. Board Member, Secretary, Vice-President), where he was elected in 2023 to be the ISLRR representative at the International Council of Ophthalmology.

In 2025 Sabel started the Sciii Foundation gGmbH for the advancement of Science & Innovation Integrity.

Following his publication in 2024 of the monograph "Fake-Mafia in der Wissenschaft", in 2025, Sabel was co-organizer of a meeting at the Royal Swedish Academy of Sciences in Stockholm, Sweden, which called for a "Reformation of Science Publishing". It was in response to the rise concern of publishing fraud and research integrity problems in an academic reputation economy. The conference participants recommended 34 action items which were published in the "Stockholm Declaration" with a co-signing opportunity for individuals and institutions.

Sabel is married and has three children.

== Research achievements ==
Sabel's research encompasses investigations into brain plasticity and repair, with a specific focus on functional recovery following partial damage to the visual system caused by optic nerve damage, glaucoma, retinitis pigmentosa, macular degeneration, brain injuries, diabetic retinopathy, or stroke. He has published over 250 scientific articles on these topics, many in highly regarded journals. His work has been cited over 13,500 times (H-index 66) and it served as inspiration for a thriller trilogy, for which author Andreas Pflüger received the German Crime Fiction Award in 2018. In 2023, Sabel's investigation into the scope of fake science publishing was recognized by Science and Financial Times.

== Research focus ==
The main areas of focus include the diagnosis and treatment of visually impaired and blind individuals through vision training and non-invasive electrostimulation. This stimulates blood circulation in the eye and brain, reactivating inactive ("silent") nerve cells. The result is improved synchronization of brain networks and recovery of visual performance. Specifically, the following topics were emphasized:

- Mechanisms of visual plasticity in the visual cortex.
- Predictors of recovery of visual functions.
- Development and validation of computer-assisted diagnostic and training procedures for brain-damaged patients.
- Development and validation of non-invasive brain stimulation methods using microcurrent treatment and relaxation techniques (eye yoga, meditation) at the SAVIR Center to enhance visual performance after damage to the retina, optic nerve, or brain. Ongoing collaborations with clinical centers in the USA (New York University, Stanford University).

A second focus is the investigation of fake publications in science.

== Memberships and honors ==
=== Memberships ===
- Deutsche Gesellschaft für Medizinische Psychologie (DGMP) [German Society for Medical Psychology]
- Deutsche Gesellschaft für Psychologie (DGfP) [German Psychological Society]
- European Neuroscience Association (ENA)
- International Brain Research Organization (IBRO)
- Society for Neuroscience (USA)
- Deutscher Hochschulverband (DHV) [German Association of University Professors and Lecturers]
- International Brain Injury Association (IBIA)
- International Society for Low Vision Research and Rehabilitation (ISLRR)

=== Awards ===
- Science Student Competition "JUGEND FORSCHT," Special Prize Rhineland-Palatinate, 1976
- Research Fellow, The Graduate School, Clark University, 1983–1984
- DAAD Fellow, 1982–84
- Fulbright Commission Fellow, 1978–80
- Clark University Exchange Scholar, 1978–80
- Fellowship of the International Society for Eye Research, 1992
- Citation in "Who's Who in the World" 1990–2015
- Citation in "Who's Who in Science and Engineering" 1993–2001
- Maria Saveria Cinquegrani Award from the Innovation Relay Centers (IRC) network of the European Community for the best innovation in Communication and Information Technologies, Florence, 2000
- Leonardo da Vinci Award, The World Organization for the Achievement of Human Potential, Philadelphia, 2005
- Science4life, 10th Business Plan Competition: Frankfurt. 3rd place in the nationwide competition, 2008
- Venture Lounge Berlin; Winner 1st place, 2009
- Award for the most innovative start-up company (flagship of the High-Tech Founders Fund) by the Federal Minister of Economics and Technology Rainer Brüderle (March 2011)
- "Hai-ju" Award, Beijing Overseas Talents Program, 2012

== Selected publications ==
- Sabel, B. A.; Slavin, M. D.; Stein, D. G. (1984). "GM1 ganglioside treatment facilitates behavioral recovery from bilateral brain damage". Science. 225 (4659): 340–342. doi:10.1126/science.6740316. PMID 6740316.
- Sabel, B. A.; Stein, D. G. (1986). "Pharmacological treatment of central nervous system injury". Nature. 323 (6088): 493. doi:10.1038/323493a0. PMID 3762702.
- Kasten, Erich; Wüst, Stefan; Behrens-Baumann, Wolfgang; Sabel, Bernhard A. (1998). "Computer-based training for the treatment of partial blindness". Nature Medicine. 4 (9): 1083–1087. doi:10.1038/2079. PMID 9734406.
- Poggel, D. A.; Kasten, E.; Sabel, B. A. (2004). "Attentional cueing improves vision restoration therapy in patients with visual field defects". Neurology. 63 (11): 2069–2076. doi:10.1212/01.wnl.0000145773.26378.e5. PMID 15596752.
- Sabel, Bernhard A.; Henrich-Noack, Petra; Fedorov, Anton; Gall, Carolin (2011). "Vision restoration after brain and retina damage: The "residual vision activation theory"". Enhancing performance for action and perception - Multisensory Integration, Neuroplasticity and Neuroprosthetics, Part II. Progress in Brain Research. Vol. 192. pp. 199–262. doi:10.1016/B978-0-444-53355-5.00013-0. ISBN 978-0-444-53355-5. PMID 21763527.
- Gall, Carolin; Sgorzaly, Susann; Schmidt, Sein; Brandt, Stephan; Fedorov, Anton; Sabel, Bernhard A. (2011). "Noninvasive transorbital alternating current stimulation improves subjective visual functioning and vision-related quality of life in optic neuropathy". Brain Stimulation. 4 (4): 175–188. doi:10.1016/j.brs.2011.07.003. PMID 21981853.
- Sabel, Bernhard A.; Fedorov, Anton B.; Naue, Nicole; Borrmann, Antonia; Herrmann, Christoph; Gall, Carolin (2011). "Non-invasive alternating current stimulation improves vision in optic neuropathy". Restorative Neurology and Neuroscience. 29 (6): 493–505. doi:10.3233/RNN-2011-0624. PMID 22124039.
- Bola, Michał; Gall, Carolin; Moewes, Christian; Fedorov, Anton; Hinrichs, Hermann; Sabel, Bernhard A. (2014). "Brain functional connectivity network breakdown and restoration in blindness". Neurology. 83 (6): 542–551. doi:10.1212/WNL.0000000000000672. PMID 24991030.
- Bola, Michał; Sabel, Bernhard A. (2015). "Dynamic reorganization of brain functional networks during cognition". NeuroImage. 114: 398–413. doi:10.1016/j.neuroimage.2015.03.057. PMID 25828884.
- Gall, C.; Schmidt, S.; Schittkowski, M. P.; Antal, A.; Ambrus, G. G.; Paulus, W.; Dannhauer, M.; Michalik, R.; Mante, A.; Bola, M.; Lux, A.; Kropf, S.; Brandt, S. A.; Sabel, B. A. (2016). "Alternating Current Stimulation for Vision Restoration after Optic Nerve Damage: A Randomized Clinical Trial". PLOS ONE. 11 (6) e0156134. Bibcode:2016PLoSO..1156134G. doi:10.1371/journal.pone.0156134. PMC 4927182. PMID 27355577.
- Wu, Zheng; Sabel, Bernhard A. (2021). "Spacetime in the brain: Rapid brain network reorganization in visual processing and recovery". Scientific Reports. 11 (1) 17940. Bibcode:2021NatSR..1117940W. doi:10.1038/s41598-021-96971-8. PMC 8429559. PMID 34504129.
- Sabel, Bernhard A. (2016). Restoring Your Vision: How to Strengthen Your Potentials in Low Vision an Blindness. Bernhard Sabel. ISBN 978-3000537851.
