= Kim Tae-seung =

South Korean politician and academic

President and CEO of the Korea Railroad Corporation
- Incumbent
- Assumed office March 3, 2026

Personal details
- Born: October 29, 1961 (age 65) Gochang, South Korea
- Education: Seoul National University

Kim Tae-seung (born October 29, 1961) is a South Korean politician and academic. Kim is the President and CEO of the Korea Railroad Corporation. Kim was the dean of the Graduate School of Logistics of Inha University.

== Early life ==
Kim was born on October 29, 1961 in Gochang, South Korea. Kim earned a bachelor´s degree in economics from Seoul National University and master´s and doctorate degrees in economics from the graduate school of Seoul National University. His master´s thesis was on labor movements and his doctorate thesis was on the trucking industry.

== Career ==
In 1991, Kim was employed by the Transport Research Office in the Korea Research Institute for Human Settlements. From 1993 to 1996, Kim was a policy secretary for the National Assembly Secretariat. Kim was a Senior Researcher for the Social Overhead Capital Research Center of the Korea Institute for Human Settlements. In 2001, Kim became a Senior Research Fellow in the Centre for Transportation Studies in the University of British Columbia in Canada.

In 2003, Kim became in-charge of the Northeast Asia, Logistics, and Transport Economics Research Center in the Korea Transport Institute. In 2005, Kim became the Vice-President of the Gyeonggi Research Institute. In 2007, Kim became a professor of the Asia Pacific School of the College of Business Administration of Inha University. From 2014 to 2016, Kim became Chairman of the Incheon Logistics Research Association. From 2017 to 2019, Kim was dean of Inha University´s Graduate School of Logistics.

On March 3, 2026, Kim was appointed to a three-year term as the 12th President and CEO of the Korea Railroad Corporation. During his inaugural address, Kim stated that his priorities were railroad safety, integrating high-speed railroad services, expanding seat capacity, creating a unified reservation system, and working with labor unions. In May 2026, Kim stated that the current fares of the Korea Railroad Company cannot cover the costs of the company.
