= Inha University =

University in Incheon, South Korea

Coordinates: 37°26′58″N 126°39′16″E

- 인하대학교
- Motto: Truth (眞)
- Type: Private
- Established: 1954
- Affiliations: Global U8 (GU8)
- President: Cho Myeong-woo
- Faculty: 859 (full time) and 1,117 (except full time)
- Undergraduates: 17,175 (as of 2022)
- Postgraduates: 1,716 (as of 2022)
- Location: Incheon, South Korea
- Campus: 150 acres (61 ha); Urban
- Colors: Sky blue Deep blue
- Mascots: Annyong and Induck
- Website: www.inha.ac.kr

Korean name
- Hangul: 인하대학교
- Hanja: 仁荷大學校
- RR: Inha daehakgyo
- MR: Inha taehakkyo

Inha University (Korean: 인하대학교; Hanja: 仁荷大學校) is a private research university located in Incheon, South Korea. Known traditionally for research and education in the engineering and physical sciences, the university was established by the first president of South Korea, Syngman Rhee. Inha is a Korean-American collaboration school, even in its name: the Morpheme "In" (인, 仁) comes from the city of Incheon and "Ha" (하, 荷) from Hawaii, USA. Started as a polytechnic university in 1954, named Inha Institute of Technology (Acronym: IIT; Korean, 인하공과대학, Inha Gonggwa Daehak, colloquially Inhagongdae), the institute has been achieving national recognition and a strong reputation as a technological research university thereafter.

Inha University is the most well-known and #1 university in Incheon area. Inha was ranked top 10 nationwide through decades according to Joongang Ilbo's annual rankings of South Korean universities; ranked 8th in 2017. Also, Inha is a member of GU8.

== History ==
=== Establishment ===
In 1952, in the midst of the Korean War, the first president of Korea, Syngman Rhee proposed the foundation of an educational institute that would provide expertise and hope to a lagging industrial sector. The driving force behind the proposal was the will and determination of a group of Koreans who had emigrated to Hawaii 50 years earlier.

The name 'Inha' comes from the name of 'Incheon' and 'Ha' in Hawaii. In March 1954, with the goal of establishing a world-class engineering university like MIT in the US, Dr. Lee Won Chul, an astronomer who obtained his Ph.D. degree, was the inaugural vice president Lee Ki-bong. On April 24, 1954, he had the entrance ceremony for 179 freshmen. On March 14, 1958, the establishment of a graduate school was approved.

Financial resources for the foundation came from the proceeds of the sale of the Korean Christian Institute, an organization founded and managed by Dr. Rhee for the purpose of educating the children of the original emigrants, donations from Korean emigrants in Hawaii and domestic supporters, and a government subsidy. Along with school site donation from Incheon city, the Ministry of Culture and Education approved the foundation of the Inha Institute in February, 1954.

Institute building construction began in earnest, to finally have the Inha Institute of Technology opened later the same year, in the scheme of the parent 6 Departments of Metallurgical, Mechanical, Mining, Electric, Shipbuilding and Chemical Engineering.

=== Time of expansion and development ===
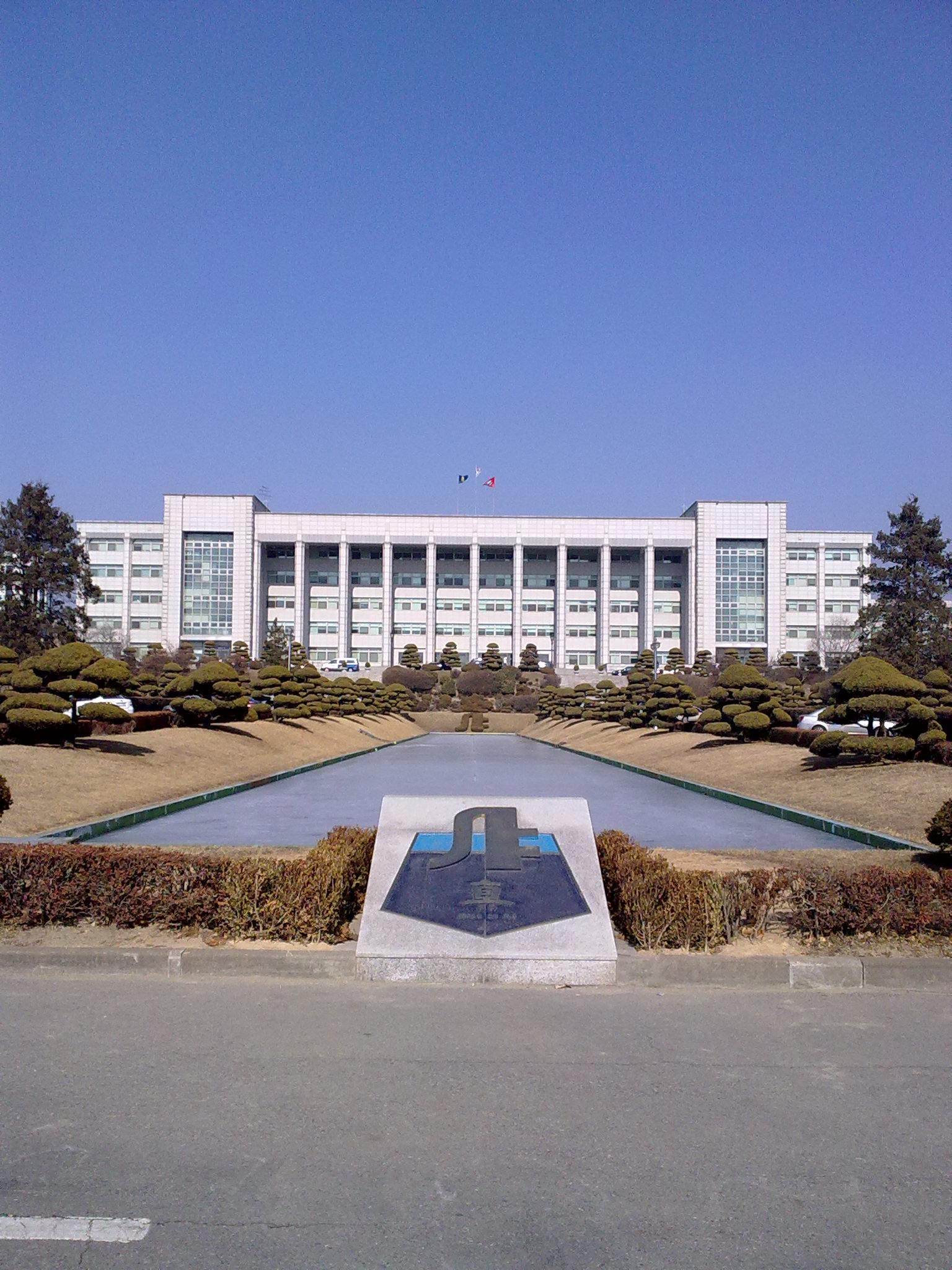
Inha University main building

The Inha Institute of Technology, which was intended to foster students who would contribute to the development of the nation's scientific and technological industries, was funded by government subsidies and foreign aid from UNESCO and the German government.

In a move to improve the management of the Inha Institute, the Board of Trustees was reorganized and Dr. Choong-Hoon Jo and Dr. Jwa-Kyung Seong assumed the positions of chairman of the board and the dean, respectively. That change brought more energy to the management, and resulted in the introduction of state-of-the-art experimental and research equipment, construction of new school buildings, research centers, practice factories, experimental tanks, library, and gymnasium, and secured excellent professors, contributing to the development of the Korean industry. With the rapid development of the Inha Institute of Technology, its size and facilities surpassed those of other colleges.

It was inevitable for the institute to be elevated to the status of university, thus in December, 1971, the Ministry of Culture and Education approved the elevation and Dr. Jwa-Kyung Seong took office as the first president, solidifying the basis toward one of the prestigious universities in Korea.

“Established on October 2, 2014, Inha University in Tashkent represents a strategic partnership between Inha University in South Korea and the Uzbek government. It holds the distinction of being the first South Korean university established abroad, specifically designed to cultivate a new generation of global IT leaders. To ensure academic excellence, the curriculum strictly mirrors the rigorous standards of the Inha University main campus.”

== Academic structure ==
Inha has 12 colleges in Engineering, Natural Sciences, Economics and Trade, Business Administration, Education, Law, Social Science, Humanities, Human Ecology, and Medicine, and 1 affiliation, 20 departments, 9 major fields of study. Inha University's Graduate school offers 47 fields of study for the Master's program and 41 for the Doctoral program. The Graduate School of Education has 31 majors for its Master's program and research course. The Graduate School of Business Administration offers 1 Master's program and 2 certificate courses and a part-time MBA program. The Graduate School of Engineering offers 14 majors in its Master's program and research courses. The Graduate School of Public Administration has 3 majors in its Master's program and research courses. Founded in 2000, the Graduate School of Information Technology and Telecommunications offers 1 major in its Master's program and the expanded and reorganized Graduate School of International Trade and Logistics now has 2 departments with 5 majors.

=== Undergraduate colleges ===
Inha university consists of 11 undergraduate colleges:

- Frontier College
- College of Engineering
- College of Natural Sciences
- College of Business Administration
- College of Education
- College of Social Sciences
- College of Humanities
- College of Medicine
- College of Future Convergence
- Arts and Sports
- Global Studies

=== Graduate schools ===
Inha has 9 graduate schools: Graduate School, Graduate School of Information Technology and Telecommunications, Graduate School of Logistics, Law School, School of Medicine, Graduate School of Engineering, Graduate School of Education, Graduate School of Business Administration, Graduate School of Public Administration.

== Facilities ==
=== Attached agencies ===
Inha university has 7 attached agencies which are listed below:

- Jung-Seok Memorial Library
- Language Training Center
- Center for Continuing Education
- Inha Museum
- Teachers Training Center
- Infirmary
- Jungseok Research Institute of International Logistics and Trade

=== Research institutes ===
Inha university has about 60 research institutes attached to it. These institutes are listed below.

Institute	Year of Establishment	Institute	Year of Establishment
Science & Technology Research Institute	1967	Humanities Research Institute	1974
Social Science Research Institute	1980	Basic Science Research Institute	1979
Student Life Research Institute	1973	Aviation Management Research Institute	1976
New Community Movement Research Institute	1977	Center for International Studies	1985
Institute for Business & Economics Research	1985	Center for Korean Studies	1986
Ocean Science & Technology Institute	1987	Sports Science Research Institute	1987
Medical Toxicology Research Center	1988	Institute of Polymer Science & Engineering	1990
Institute of Advanced Materials	1990	Institute of Computer Science & Applications	1990
Management Research Institute	1992	Environmental Research Institute	1992
Institute for Information and Electronics Research	1992	Institute for Mechanical Engineering	1995
Research Institute of Ship and Ocean Engineering	1994	Educational Research Institute	1994
Research Institute of Human Ecology	1994	Research Institute of Semiconductor Thin Film Technology	1995
Research Institute of Chemical Dynamics	1996	Research Institute for Medical Sciences	1996
Research Institute of Water Resources & Systems	1996	Research Institute of Construction and Environment Systems	1996
Geoinformatic Engineering Research Institute	1998	Yellow Sea Transportation System Research Center	1996
Environmental Technology Center of Thermal Plasma	2005	Institute of Industrial Biotechnology	2000
Institute for Legal Studies	1999	Regional Research Center for Coastal Environments of the Yellow Sea	1999
Intelligent GIS Research Center	1998	UWB-ITRC Center	2003
Institute of Industrial Biotechnology	2000	Institute for Culture Management and Psychology	2005
Asia Pacific School of Logistics	2004	Regional Innovation Center For Light Materials	1999
Center for Advanced Bioseparation Technology	2000		

== Acceptance rate and Ranking ==
University rankings
JoongAng National	Domestic	=14
QS National	General	=19
THE National	General	22–27
ARWU National	Research	14–18
QS Asia (Asia version)	General	116
THE Asia (Asia version)	General	=154
ARWU World	Research	601–700
QS World	General	=643
THE World	General	801–1000
USNWR World	General	=1327

INHA University is one of the top private universities in Incheon, South Korea. It is ranked #531-540 in QS World University Rankings 2023, and #120 in QS Asian University Rankings 2023.

In 2022, 43,062 applicants applied to 2,631 recruitments for early admission to INHA University, recording a competition rate of 16.37:1 (6.1%). This is the result of an increase of 2.10 points in competition rate from 14.27:1 (7.0%) and the increase in number of applicants by 4,936. Despite the continuous decline in school-age population, it showed the highest competition rate in the pasts four years.

Taejoon Jeon, the director of the Admissions Office, said "Despite various difficult conditions such as a decrease in the school age population and a decrease in the number of early admissions, INHA University's competition for early admissions has risen sharply. This is the result of the recent recognition of INHA University's potential, which has shown excellent business orders in various education and research fields."

== Notable alumni ==
- Changmin (TVXQ)
- Choi Min-gi (NU'EST)
- Choi Si-won (Super Junior)
- Lee Minhyuk (BTOB)
- Chun Ho-jin
- Chae Sang-woo
- Han Bo-bae
- Hwang Min-hyun (NU'EST/Wanna One)
- Jeon Hyoseong (Secret)
- Kim Gura
- Kim Ki-Tae
- Kim Ryeowook (Super Junior)
- Kim Sung-ryung
- Lee Hyun-seung
- Lim Kyung-Wan
- No Min-woo (TRAX)
- Park Chan-dae
- Park Chanyeol (Exo)
- Kim Jun-myeon (Exo)
- Park Cho-a (AOA)
- Seo Jun-young
- Song Ji-Man
- Song Yoo-geun
- Park Kyung (Block B)
