= University of Fortaleza =

University in Fortaleza, Brazil

- Universidade de Fortaleza
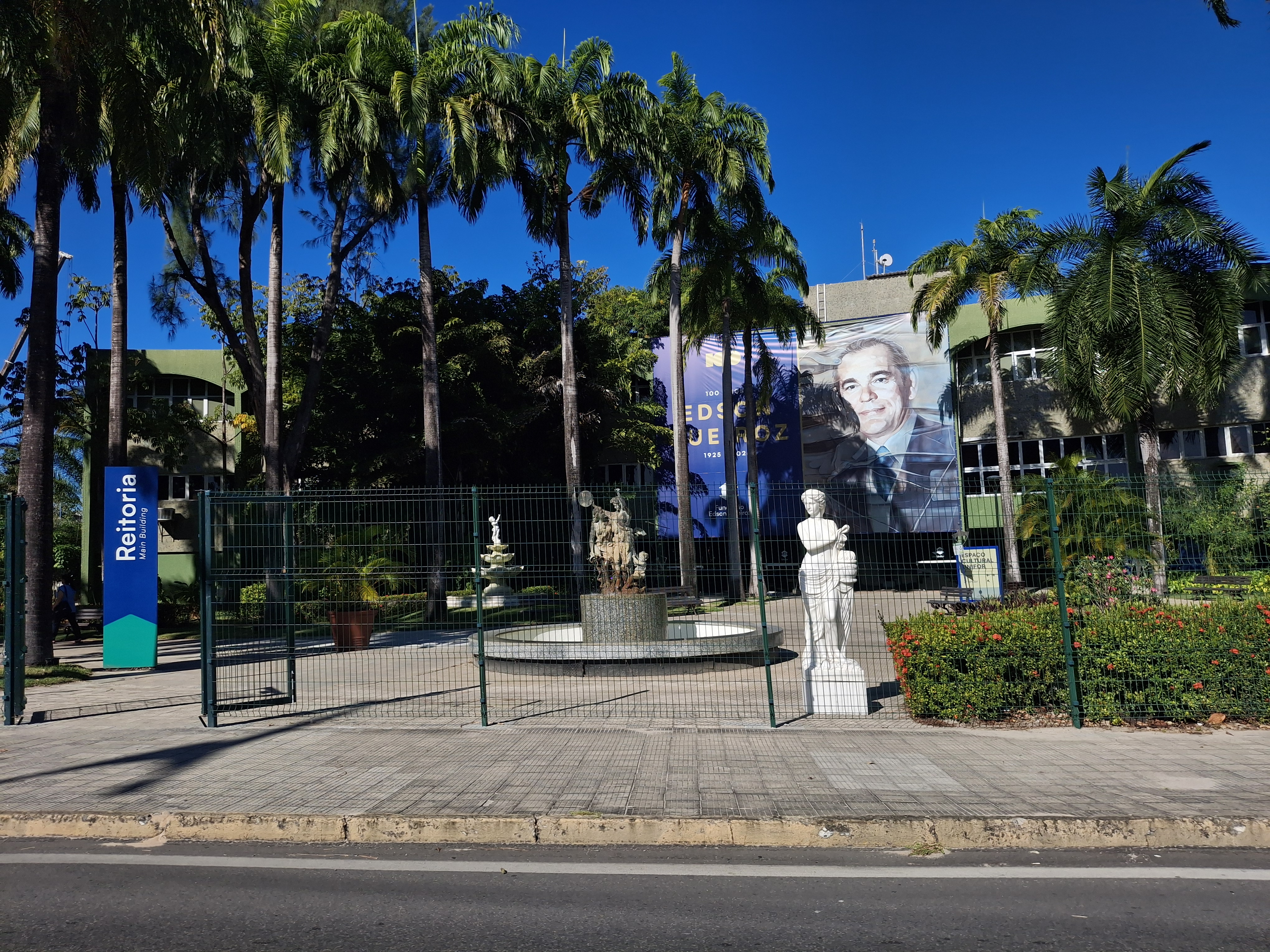
- Type: Private
- Established: 1973
- President: Randal Martins Pompeu
- Students: 1,100
- Location: Fortaleza, Brazil; 3°46′7.61″S 38°28′41.02″W
- Affiliations: Global U8 (GU8)
- Website: www.unifor.br

University of Fortaleza (Portuguese: Universidade de Fortaleza, UNIFOR) is a private university located in Fortaleza, Brazil.

== Notable alumni ==
- Melissa Gurgel
- Jade Romero
- Valdecy Urquiza
- Patrícia Saboya
