= Otto von Guericke University Magdeburg =

Public university in Germany

- Otto-von-Guericke-Universität Magdeburg
- Motto: Rethinking the world together (German: Zusammen die Welt neu denken)
- Type: Public
- Established: 1993; 33 years ago
- Affiliations: GU8, EUA, GRF, DFN, GRC
- Budget: €156.6 mil.
- Chancellor: Angela Matthies
- Rector: Jens Strackeljan
- Academic staff: 1,226
- Administrative staff: 830
- Students: 13,143
- Location: Magdeburg, Saxony-Anhalt, Germany; 52°08′24″N 11°38′35″E
- Colours: Purple
- Website: www.ovgu.de

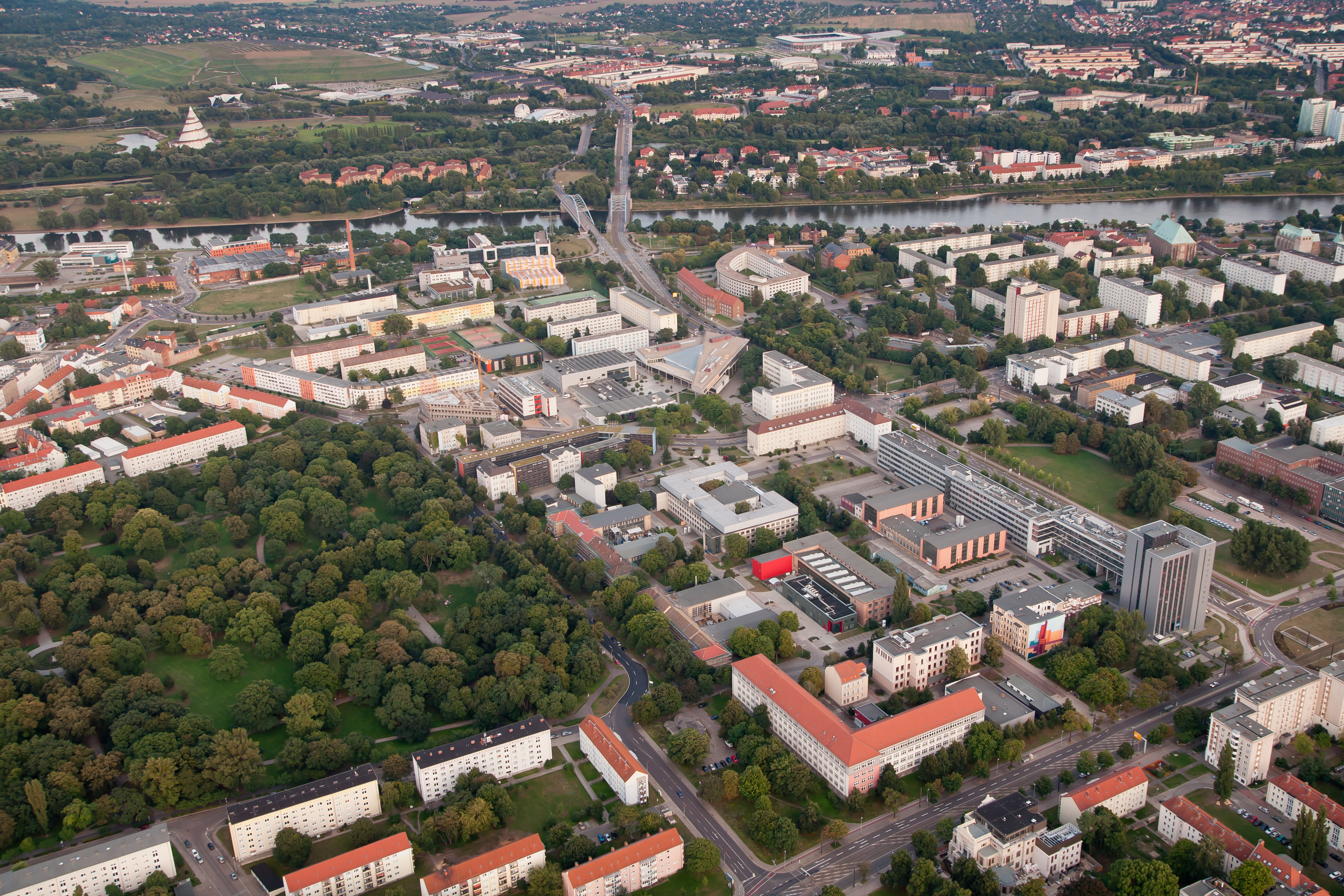
Aerial view of the university's main campus

The Otto von Guericke University Magdeburg (English pronunciation; German: Otto-von-Guericke-Universität Magdeburg; OVGU) is a public research university founded in 1993 and located in Magdeburg, the capital city of Saxony-Anhalt, Germany. The university has about 13,000 students across nine faculties.

The university is named after the physicist and former mayor of Magdeburg Otto von Guericke. The main research areas of the university are in the process engineering, neurosciences, biosystems technology, disease prevention, automotive research, digital engineering and renewable energies.

One of the best-known alumni and professors is the Leibniz Prize winner Axel Ockenfels.

== History ==
The university was founded in 1993 and is therefore one of the youngest universities in Germany. The roots of the university lie in the three higher education institutions that previously existed in the city of Magdeburg: Technical University, University of Education and Medical Academy. Due to the three predecessor institutions, there are still three campuses today: "Universitätsplatz", "Universitätsklinikum" and "Zschokkestrasse". Since 2022, Otto von Guericke University has been part of the European university network "EU Green" along with eight other universities. This is intended to promote international cooperation in order to adequately meet future social challenges.

== Academics ==
=== Faculties ===
- Faculty of Computer Science (FIN)
- Faculty of Economics and Management (FWW)
- Faculty of Humanities, Social Sciences and Education (FHW)
- Faculty of Mathematics (FMA)
- Faculty of Medicine (FME)
- Faculty of Natural Sciences (FNW)
- Faculty of Mechanical Engineering (FMB)
- Faculty of Process and Systems Engineering (FVST)
- Faculty of Electrical Engineering and Information Technology (FEIT)

=== Rankings ===
University rankings

Overall – Global & National
THE World 2024	601–800	46–48

In the Times Higher Education World University Rankings of 2024, the university is placed at 601–800 globally and 46–48 within the country.In the 2026 Times Higher Education World University Rankings, Otto von Guericke University Magdeburg was placed in the 601–800th bracket.

=== IKUS ===
IKUS is an inter-cultural association for international students. It contributes to cultural synergies between the countries. Students actively participate in and celebrate cultural festivals frequently. A large number of foreign students organize the days for each country.

=== MIPS ===
MIPS (Magdeburg International PhD Students) is the network for international PhD students at OvGU. This association helps to create and enhance the contact between international PhD students in order to promote the social and academic integration of young scientists. MIPS offers support and advice in various areas, e.g. to learn about Magdeburg and the German language, to give information about scholarships and job opportunities.

== Studentenwerk Magdeburg ==
Studentenwerk Magdeburg is a student organization which provides a mensa (canteen) and dormitories for students. There are more than 10 dormitories near or on the university's campus.

== Notable people ==
University seal

A sample of alumni and lecturers of the university includes:

- Antje Buschschulte – swimming world champion and PhD biologist
- Arno Ros – philosopher and former professor of theoretical philosophy at the university
- Axel Ockenfels – professor for economics
- Bernhard Sabel – psychologist who heads the Institute of Medical Psychology
- Birgitta Wolff – economist, politician and former president of the Goethe University Frankfurt
- Claudia Maria Buch – economist, university teacher and currently Vice President of the Bundesbank
- Dagmar Schipanski – physicist, university teacher and politician
- Henning Scheich – professor for physiology at the medical faculty
- Nguyễn Thiện Nhân – Vietnam's former Deputy Prime Minister and Minister of Education and Training, who graduated with a doctorate in cybernetics
- Rumiana Jeleva – former Minister of Foreign Affairs of Bulgaria, who earned a PhD in sociology
- Raila Odinga - a Kenyan politician, former prime minister.

== See also ==
- Journal of Automata, Languages and Combinatorics, an international academic journal in the field of theoretical computer science published by the university.
- Technische Mechanik, an international academic journal in the field of analytical, experimental and numerical mechanics is also published by the university.
